= Ahmed Adnan Saygun Sanat Merkezi (Tram İzmir) =

LRT station in İzmir, Turkey

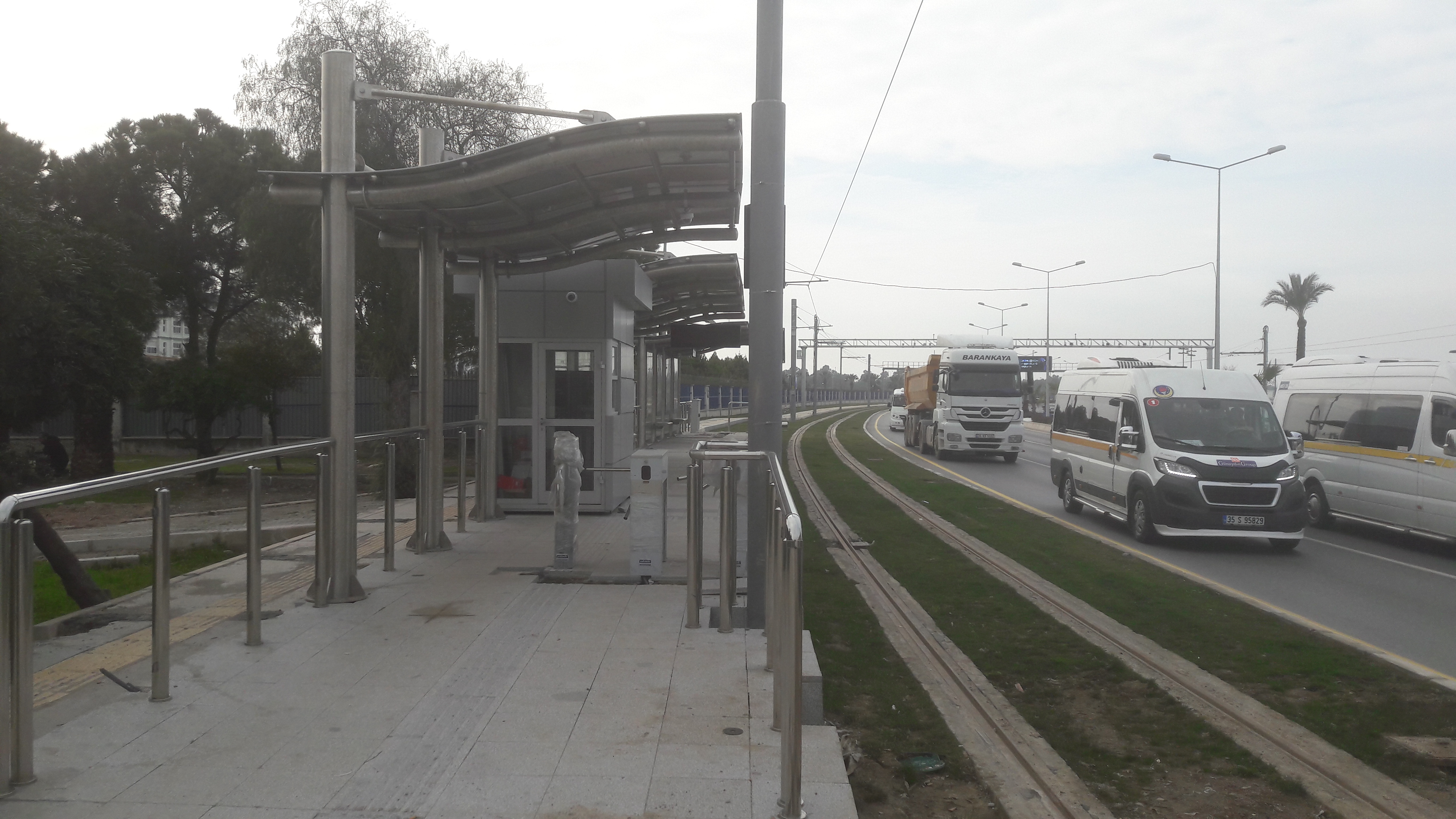
- The eastbound platform in February 2018.

General information
- Location: Mustafa Kemal Sahil Blv., Mehmet Ali Akman Mah., 35290; Konak
- Coordinates: 38.4005°N 27.0777°E
- System: Tram İzmir light-rail station
- Owner: İzmir Metropolitan Municipality
- Operator: İzmir Metro A.Ş.
- Line: T2
- Platforms: 2 side platforms
- Tracks: 2
- Connections: ESHOT Bus: 5, 6, 7, 17, 24, 25, 202, 480, 486, 510, 650, 671, 690, 873, 977

Construction
- Accessible: Yes

History
- Opened: 24 March 2018
- Electrified: 750V DC OHLE

Services
| Preceding station | Tram İzmir | Following station |
|---|---|---|
| Üçkuyular towards Fahrettin Altay | T2 | Güzelyalı towards Halkapınar |
Track layout
Location

Ahmed Adnan Saygun Sanat Merkezi is a station on the Konak Tram line in İzmir, Turkey. It is located along Mustafa Kemal Coastal Boulevard in west Konak. The station consists of two side platforms, one on each side of the boulevard.

The station opened on 24 March 2018.

== Connections ==
ESHOT operates city bus service on 16th Street.

ESHOT Bus service
| Route number | Stop | Route | Location |
|---|---|---|---|
| 5 | Adnan Saygun Sanat Merkezi | Narlıdere — Üçkuyular İskele | 16th Street |
| 6 | Adnan Saygun Sanat Merkezi | Arıkent — Üçkuyular İskele | 16th Street |
| 7 | Adnan Saygun Sanat Merkezi | Sahilevleri — Üçkuyular İskele | 16th Street |
| 17 | Adnan Saygun Sanat Merkezi | Uzundere Toplu Konutları — F. Altay Aktarma Merkezi | 16th Street |
| 24 | Adnan Saygun Sanat Merkezi | Kavacık — Üçkuyular İskele | 16th Street |
| 25 | Adnan Saygun Sanat Merkezi | Oyunlar Köyü — Üçkuyular İskele | 16th Street |
| 202 | Adnan Saygun Sanat Merkezi | Cumhuriyet Meydanı — Havalimanı (Airport) | 16th Street |
| 480 | Adnan Saygun Sanat Merkezi | İnciraltı — Üçkuyular İskele | 16th Street |
| 486 | Adnan Saygun Sanat Merkezi | Oyak Sitesi — İnciraltı | 16th Street |
| 510 | Adnan Saygun Sanat Merkezi | Gaziemir — Balçova | 16th Street |
| 650 | Adnan Saygun Sanat Merkezi | Fuar İzmir — Balçova | 16th Street |
| 671 | Adnan Saygun Sanat Merkezi | Şirinyer Aktarma Merkezi — F. Altay Aktarma Merkezi | 16th Street |
| 690 | Adnan Saygun Sanat Merkezi | Tınaztepe — F. Altay | 16th Street |
| 873 | Adnan Saygun Sanat Merkezi | Yenitepe Evleri — Fahrettin Altay Aktarma | 16th Street |
| 977 | Adnan Saygun Sanat Merkezi | İzmir Demokrasi Üniversitesi — Üçkuyular İskele | 16th Street |

== Nearby places of interest ==
- Ahmed Adnan Saygun Arts Center
