= Kültürpark - Atatürk Lisesi (Tram İzmir) =

LRT station in İzmir, Turkey

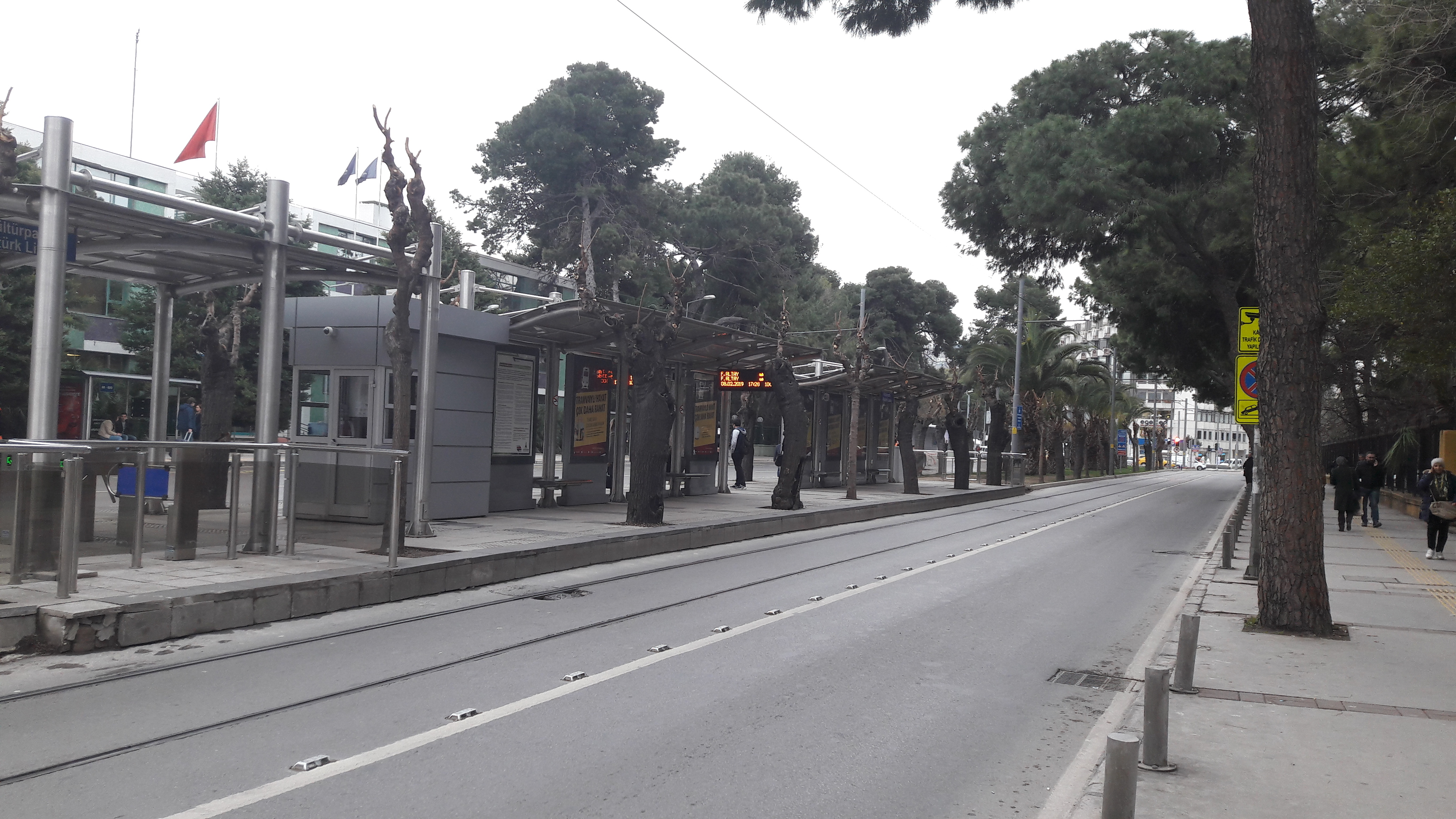

General information
- Location: Şair Eşref Blv., Kültür Mah., 35220; Konak
- Coordinates: 38.4290°N 27.1414°E
- System: Tram İzmir light-rail station
- Owner: İzmir Metropolitan Municipality
- Operator: İzmir Metro A.Ş.
- Line: T2
- Platforms: 1 island platform
- Tracks: 2
- Connections: ESHOT Bus: 202, 470, 680, 681, 691, 811, 910, 930, 940, 950, 951

Construction
- Structure type: At-grade raised platform
- Parking: in İzmir Atatürk High School
- Accessible: Yes

History
- Opened: 24 March 2018
- Electrified: 750V DC OHLE

Services
Preceding station	Tram İzmir	Following station
Gazi Bulvarı towards Fahrettin Altay	T2	Hocazade Camii towards Halkapınar
Location

Kültürpark - Atatürk Lisesi is a light-rail station on the Konak Tram of the Tram İzmir system in İzmir, Turkey. Originally named Fuar, it is located on Şair Eşref Boulevard in Kültür, between Kültürpark, and the İzmir Atatürk High School from which the station gets its name. The station consists of an island platforms serving two tracks.

The station opened on 24 March 2018.

== Connections ==
ESHOT operates city bus service on Şair Eşref Boulevard.

ESHOT Bus service
Route number	Stop	Route	Location
202	Montrö	Cumhuriyet Meydanı — Havalimanı (Airport)	Şair Eşref Boulevard
470	Montrö	Tınaztepe — Lozan Meydanı	Şair Eşref Boulevard
680	Montrö	Bozyaka — Lozan Meydanı	Şair Eşref Boulevard
681	Montrö	F. Altay — Lozan Meydanı	Şair Eşref Boulevard
691	Montrö	Gaziemir — Lozan Meydanı	Şair Eşref Boulevard
811	Montrö	Engelliler Merkezi — Montrö	Şair Eşref Boulevard
910 (night bus)	Montrö	Gaziemir — Konak	Şair Eşref Boulevard
930 (night bus)	Montrö	Bornova — Konak	Şair Eşref Boulevard
940 (night bus)	Montrö	Buca — Konak	Şair Eşref Boulevard
950 (night bus)	Montrö	Narlıdere — Konak	Şair Eşref Boulevard
951	Montrö	Lozan Meydanı — Konak	Şair Eşref Boulevard

== Nearby Places of Interest ==
- Kültürpark - The largest city park in the city.
- İzmir Atatürk High School
- Lozan Square
- Montrö Square

== Pictures ==
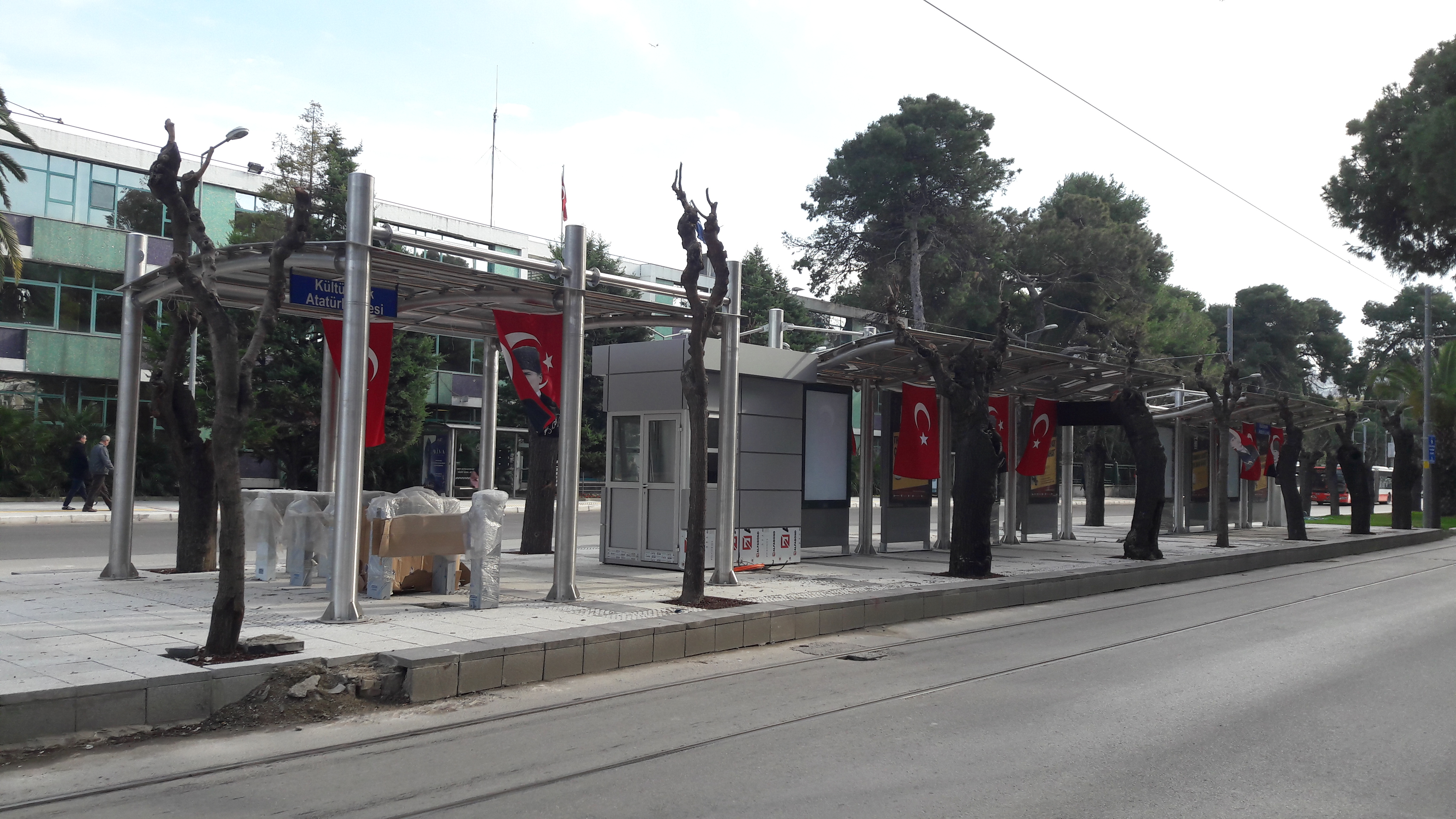
Kültürpark station in February 2018, before opening.
