= Güzelyalı (Tram İzmir) =

LRT station in İzmir, Turkey

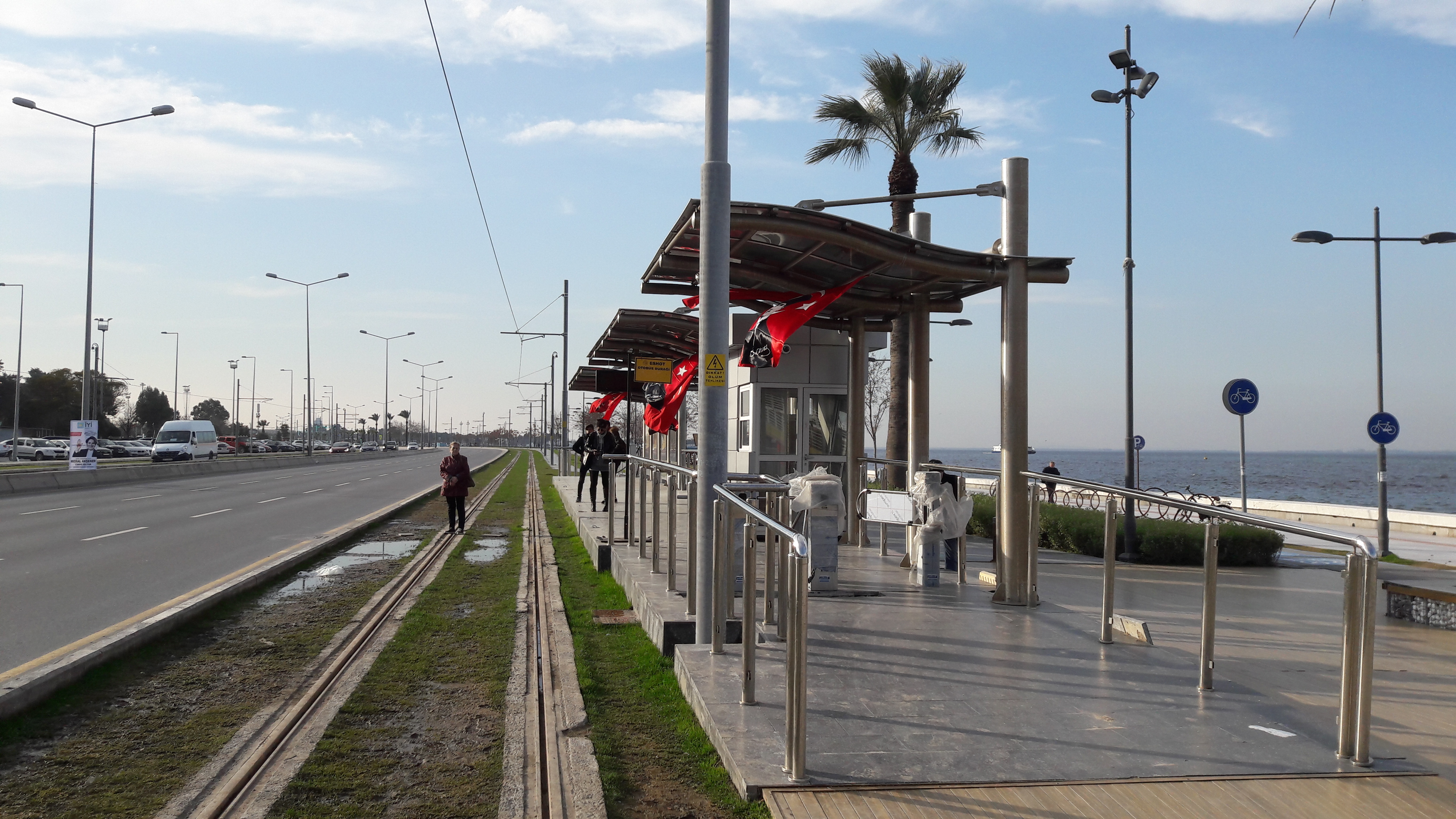
- The southbound platform in February 2018.

General information
- Location: Mustafa Kemal Sahil Blv., Güzelyalı Mah., 35290; Konak
- Coordinates: 38.3994°N 27.0831°E
- System: Tram İzmir light-rail station
- Owner: İzmir Metropolitan Municipality
- Operator: İzmir Metro A.Ş.
- Line: T2
- Platforms: 2 side platforms
- Tracks: 2
- Connections: İzdeniz at Göztepe Pier

Construction
- Accessible: Yes

History
- Opened: 24 March 2018
- Electrified: 750V DC OHLE

Services
Preceding station	Tram İzmir	Following station
Ahmed Adnan Saygun Sanat Merkezi towards Fahrettin Altay	T2	Göztepe towards Halkapınar
Location

Güzelyalı is a station on the Konak Tram line in İzmir, Turkey. It is located along Mustafa Kemal Coastal Boulevard in west Konak. The station consists of two side platforms, one on each side of the boulevard.

Güzelyalı station opened on 24 March 2018.
