= Alsancak Stadyumu (Tram İzmir) =

LRT station in İzmir, Turkey

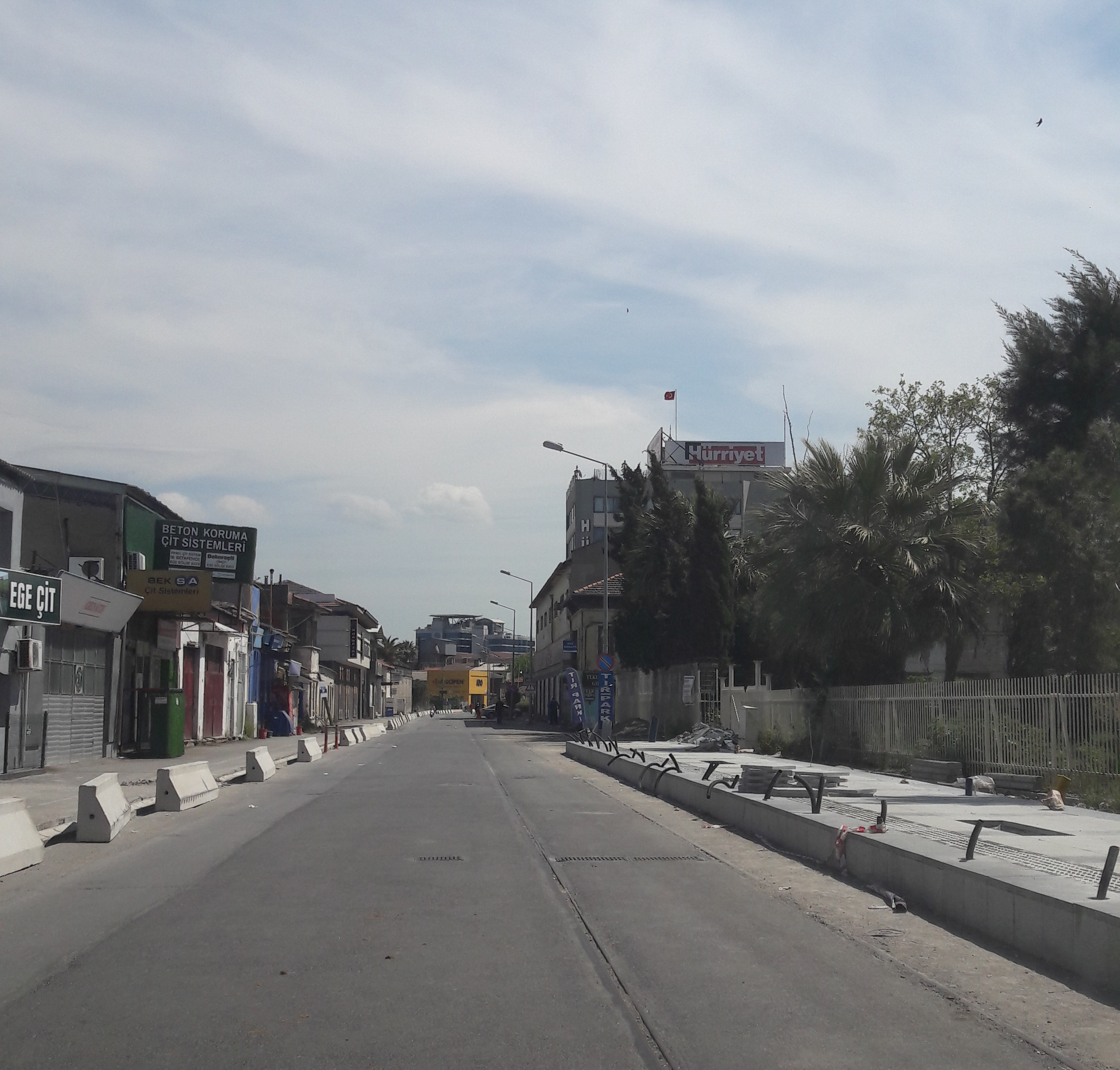
- Alsancak Stadyumu station in April 2017.

General information
- Location: Şehitler Cd., Umurbey Mah., 35230; Konak
- Coordinates: 38.4381°N 27.1519°E
- System: Tram İzmir light-rail station
- Owner: İzmir Metropolitan Municipality
- Operator: İzmir Metro A.Ş.
- Line: T2
- Platforms: 1 side platform
- Tracks: 1

Construction
- Accessible: Yes

History
- Opened: 24 March 2018
- Electrified: 750V DC OHLE

Services
Preceding station	Tram İzmir	Following station
Alsancak Gar towards Fahrettin Altay	T2	Üniversite towards Halkapınar
Location

Alsancak Stadyumu is a light-rail station on the Konak Tram of the Tram İzmir system in İzmir, Turkey. It is located along Şehitler Avenue and consists of a side platform and one track. Only Halkapınar-bound (Eastbound) trams stop at Alsancak Stadyumu, since westbound trams travel along Liman Avenue one block north. The station is located next to the former Alsancak Stadium.

The station opened on 24 March 2018.
