= Havagazı (Tram İzmir) =

LRT station in İzmir, Turkey

General information
- Location: Liman Cd., Umurbey Mah., 35230; Konak
- Coordinates: 38.4400°N 27.1579°E
- System: Tram İzmir light-rail station
- Owner: İzmir Metropolitan Municipality
- Operator: İzmir Metro A.Ş.
- Line: T2
- Platforms: 1 side platform
- Tracks: 1

Construction
- Accessible: Yes

History
- Opened: 24 March 2018
- Electrified: 750V DC OHLE

Services
Preceding station	Tram İzmir	Following station
Alsancak Gar towards Fahrettin Altay	T2	Halkapınar Terminus
Location

Havagazı is a light-rail station on the Konak Tram of the Tram İzmir system in İzmir, Turkey. It is located along Liman Avenue and consists of a side platform and one track. Only Fahrettin Altay-bound (Westbound) trams stop at Havagazı, since eastbound trams travel along Şehitler Avenue one block south.

The station opened on 24 March 2018.
