= Üçkuyular (Tram İzmir) =

LRT station in İzmir, Turkey

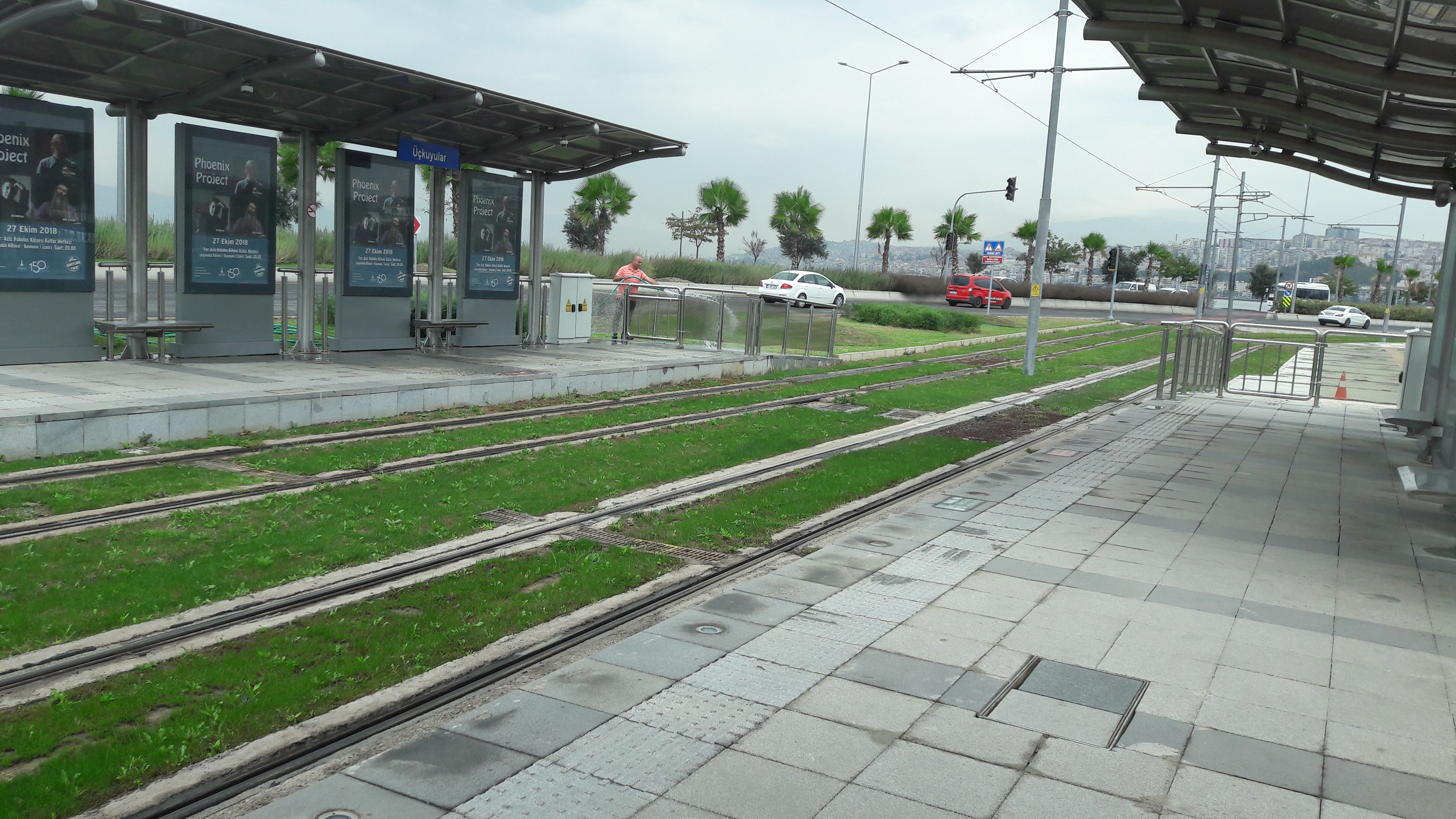

General information
- Location: Mustafa Kemal Sahil Blv., Mehmet Ali Akman Mah., 35290; Konak
- Coordinates: 38.4029°N 27.0722°E
- System: Tram İzmir light-rail station
- Owner: İzmir Metropolitan Municipality
- Operator: İzmir Metro A.Ş.
- Line: T2
- Platforms: 2 side platforms
- Tracks: 2
- Connections: İzdeniz at Üçkuyular Terminal; ESHOT Bus: 5, 6, 7, 10, 24, 25, 480, 486, 650, 945, 946, 977

Construction
- Accessible: Yes

History
- Opened: 24 March 2018
- Electrified: 750V DC OHLE

Services
Preceding station	Tram İzmir	Following station
Fahrettin Altay Terminus	T2	Ahmed Adnan Saygun Sanat Merkezi towards Halkapınar
Location

Üçkuyular is a light-rail station on the Konak Tram line in İzmir, Turkey. It is located along Mustafa Kemal Coastal Boulevard in west Konak. The station consists of two side platforms, one on each side of the boulevard. Connection to İzdeniz ferry service is available at the Üçkuyular Ferry Terminal.

Üçkuyular station opened on 24 March 2018.

== Connections ==
Üçkuyular Ferry Terminal and bus terminus is nearby. Routes 5, 6, 7, 10, 24, 25, 480, 650, 945, 946, 977 terminate in the Üçkuyular Ferry Pier Bus Interchange. There is also a bus stop for route 486.
