= Göztepe (Tram İzmir) =

LRT station in İzmir, Turkey

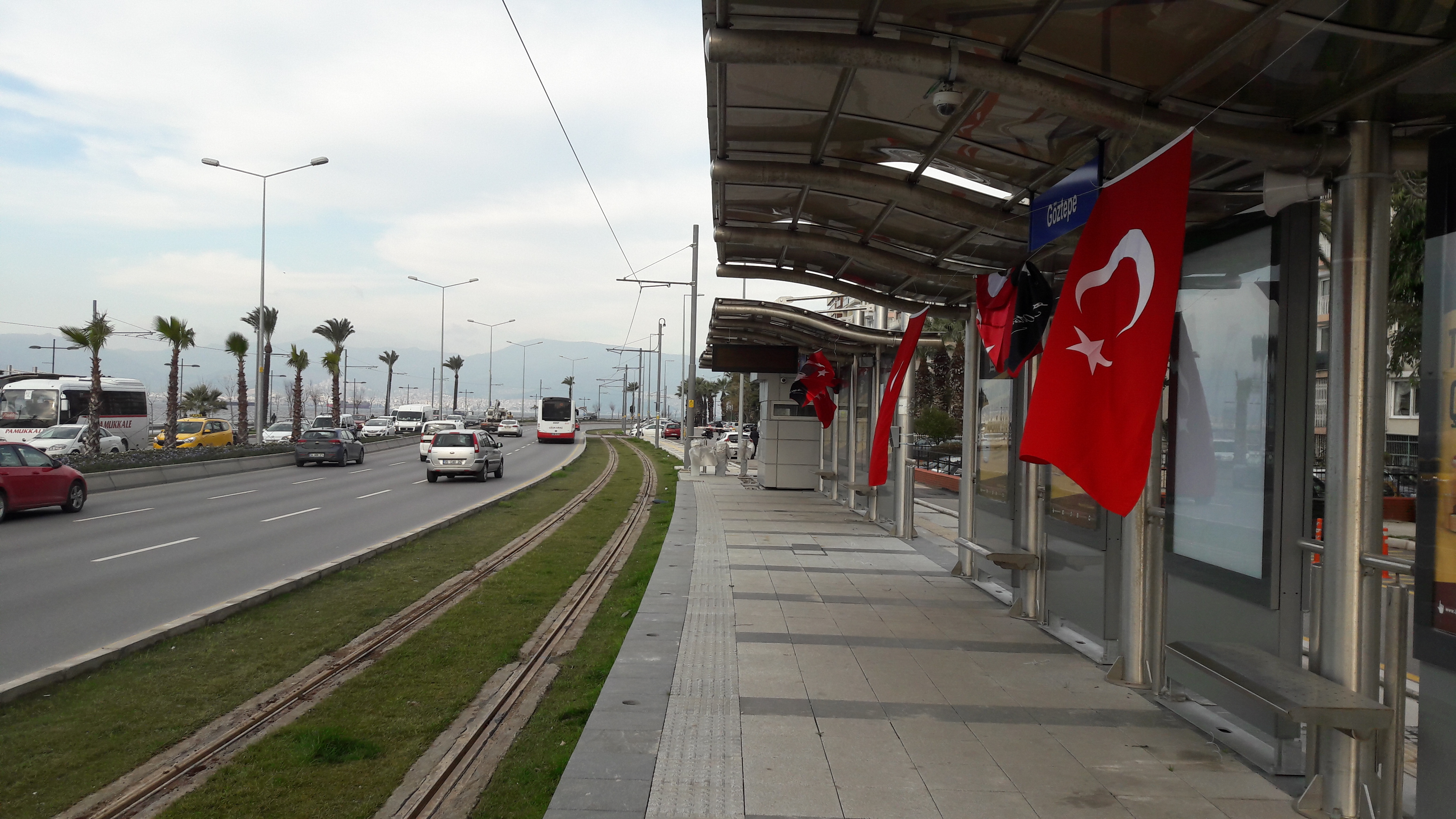
- The northbound platform in February 2018.

General information
- Location: Mustafa Kemal Sahil Blv., Göztepe Mah., 35290; Konak
- Coordinates: 38.4032°N 27.0955°E
- System: Tram İzmir light-rail station
- Owner: İzmir Metropolitan Municipality
- Operator: İzmir Metro A.Ş.
- Line: T2
- Platforms: 2 side platforms
- Tracks: 2

Construction
- Accessible: Yes

History
- Opened: 24 March 2018
- Electrified: 750V DC OHLE

Services
Preceding station	Tram İzmir	Following station
Güzelyalı towards Fahrettin Altay	T2	Sadıkbey towards Halkapınar
Location

Göztepe is a station on the Konak Tram line in İzmir, Turkey. It is located along Mustafa Kemal Coastal Boulevard in west Konak. The station consists of two side platforms, one on each side of the boulevard.

Göztepe station opened on 24 March 2018.
