= Gazi Bulvarı (Tram İzmir) =

LRT station in İzmir, Turkey

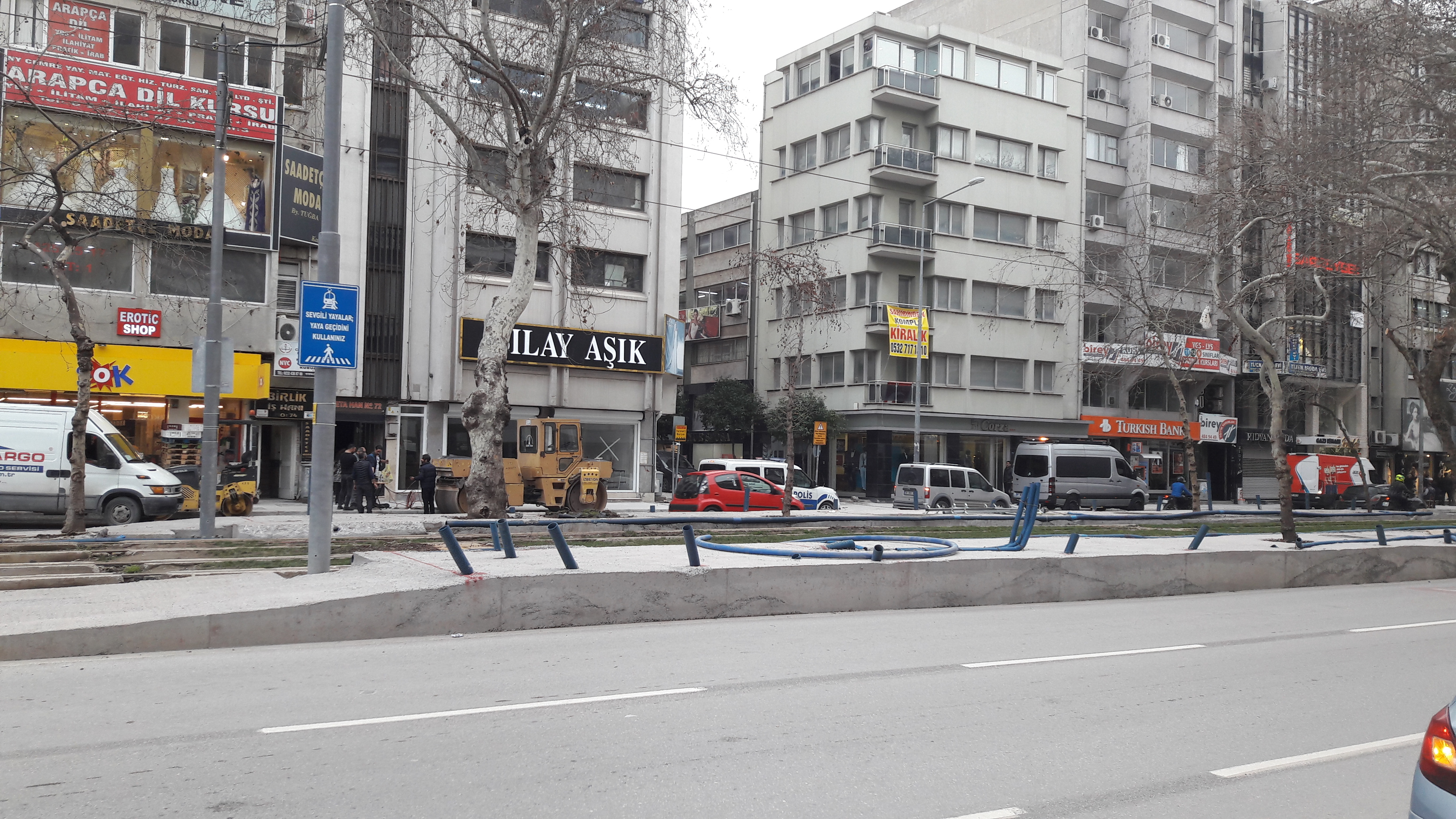
- Construction of the station in February 2018.

General information
- Location: Gazi Blv., Akdeniz Mah., 35210; Konak
- Coordinates: 38.4241°N 27.1370°E
- System: Tram İzmir light-rail station
- Owner: İzmir Metropolitan Municipality
- Operator: İzmir Metro A.Ş.
- Line: T2
- Platforms: 2 side platforms
- Tracks: 2
- Connections: İzmir Metro at Çankaya station ESHOT Bus: Çardak: 35, 302, 466, 811, 951; Çardak 2: 34, 36, 39, 41, 42, 44, 45, 46, 236, 838

Construction
- Accessible: Yes

History
- Opened: 24 March 2018
- Electrified: 750V DC OHLE

Services
Preceding station	Tram İzmir	Following station
Konak İskele towards Fahrettin Altay	T2	Kültürpark - Atatürk Lisesi towards Halkapınar
Location

Gazi Bulvarı is a light-rail station on the Konak Tram of the Tram İzmir system in İzmir, Turkey. It is located on Gazi Boulevard (Turkish: Gazi Bulvarı), from which the station gets its name. The station consists of an island platforms serving two tracks. Transfer is available to the İzmir Metro at Çankaya station.

Gazi Bulvarı station opened on 24 March 2018.

== Connections ==
ESHOT operates city bus service on Gazi Boulevard.

ESHOT Bus service
Route number	Stop	Route	Location
34	Çardak 2	Esentepe — Gümrük	Gazi Boulevard
35	Çardak	Ballıkuyu — Konak	Gazi Boulevard
36	Çardak 2	Şirinyer Aktarma Merkezi — Gümrük	Gazi Boulevard
39	Çardak 2	İsmetpaşa Mah. — Gümrük	Gazi Boulevard
41	Çardak 2	Levent — Gümrük	Gazi Boulevard
42	Çardak 2	Çınartepe — Gümrük	Gazi Boulevard
44	Çardak 2	Mersinpınar — Gümrük	Gazi Boulevard
45	Çardak 2	Gültepe — Gümrük	Gazi Boulevard
46	Çardak 2	Çobançeşme — Gümrük	Gazi Boulevard
236	Çardak 2	Şirinyer Aktarma Merkezi — Gümrük	Gazi Boulevard
302	Çardak	Otogar — Konak	Gazi Boulevard
466	Çardak	Şirinyer Aktarma Merkezi — Konak	Gazi Boulevard
811	Çardak	Engelliler Merkezi — Montrö	Gazi Boulevard
838	Çardak 2	Şirinyer Aktarma Merkezi — Gümrük	Gazi Boulevard
951	Çardak	Lozan Meydanı — Konak	Gazi Boulevard

== Nearby Places of Interest ==
- İzmir Stock Exchange
