= Alsancak Gar (Tram İzmir) =

LRT station in İzmir, Turkey

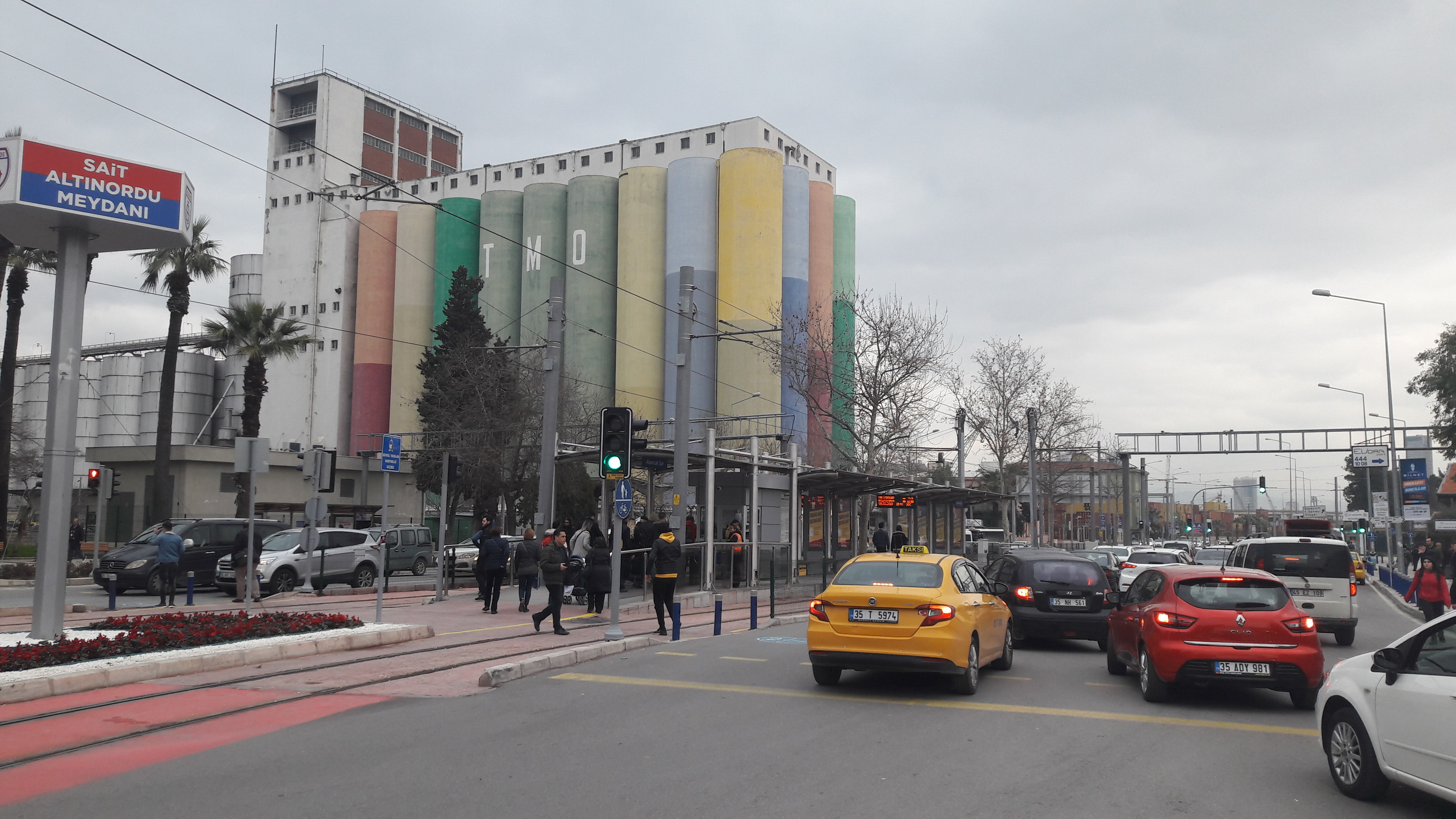

General information
- Location: Liman Cd., Umurbey Mah., 35230; Konak
- Coordinates: 38.4397°N 27.1483°E
- System: Tram İzmir light-rail station
- Owner: İzmir Metropolitan Municipality
- Operator: İzmir Metro A.Ş.
- Line: T2
- Platforms: 1 island platform
- Tracks: 2
- Connections: İZBAN at Alsancak station ESHOT Bus: 121, 253, 912, 920, 930, 963

Construction
- Accessible: Yes

History
- Opened: 24 March 2018
- Electrified: 750V DC OHLE

Services
Preceding station	Tram İzmir	Following station
Atatürk Spor Salonu towards Fahrettin Altay	T2	Havagazı (Westbound only) towards Halkapınar
Atatürk Spor Salonu towards Fahrettin Altay	T2	Alsancak Stadyumu (Eastbound only) towards Halkapınar
Location

Alsancak Gar is a light-rail station on the Konak Tram of the Tram İzmir system in İzmir, Turkey. It is located along Liman Avenue, next to Alsancak station. Transfer to İZBAN commuter rail service is available at Alsancak station.

Alsancak Gar station opened on 24 March 2018.

== Connections ==
ESHOT operates regional bus service, accessible from the station.

ESHOT Bus service
Route number	Stop	Route	Location
121	Alsancak Gar	Mavişehir Aktarma Merkezi — Konak	Atatürk Street, Liman Street
253	Alsancak Gar	Halkapınar Metro 2 — Konak	Atatürk Street, Liman Street
912	Alsancak Gar	Egekent Aktarma Merkezi — Alsancak Gar	Liman Street
920 (night bus)	Alsancak Gar	Çiğli — Konak	Atatürk Street
930 (night bus)	Alsancak Gar	Bornova — Konak	Atatürk Street
963	Alsancak Gar	Evka 3 Metro — Alsancak Gar	Liman Street

== Nearby places of interest ==
- Alsancak railway station
- Yzb. Şerafettin Bey Street - Plenty of Greek houses from the Ottoman Empire.
- İzmir Towngas Factory - A former towngas plant, turned into a museum and open air theater.

== Pictures ==
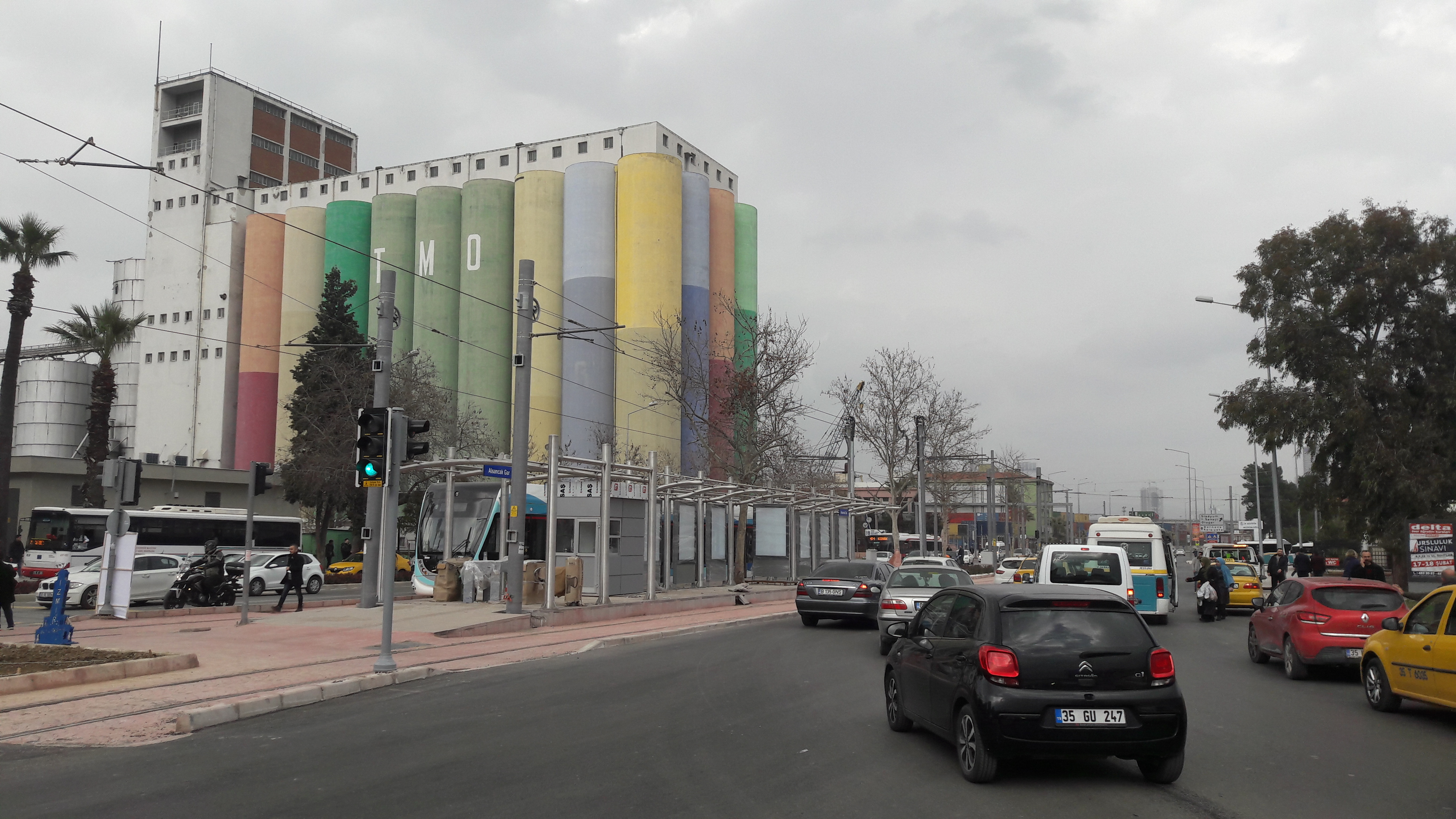
Alsancak gar station in February 2018, before opening.
