= Hocazade Camii (Tram İzmir) =

LRT station in İzmir, Turkey

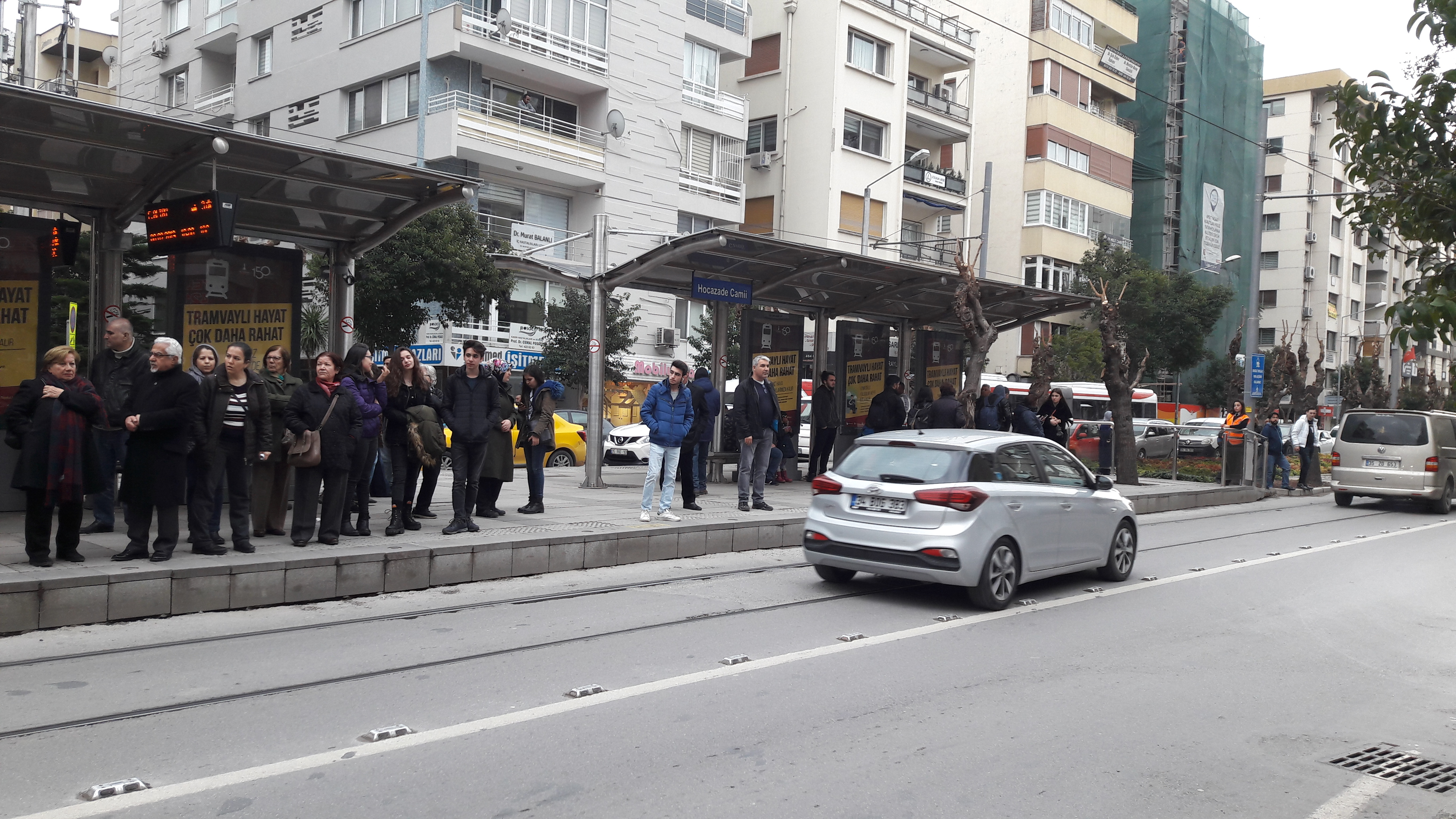

General information
- Location: Ali Çetinkaya Blv., Mimar Sinan Mah., 35220; Konak
- Coordinates: 38.43305°N 27.14405°E
- System: Tram İzmir light-rail station
- Owner: İzmir Metropolitan Municipality
- Operator: İzmir Metro A.Ş.
- Line: T2
- Platforms: 1 island platform
- Tracks: 2
- Connections: ESHOT Bus: 930

Construction
- Accessible: Yes

History
- Opened: 24 March 2018
- Electrified: 750V DC OHLE

Services
| Preceding station | Tram İzmir | Following station |
|---|---|---|
| Kültürpark - Atatürk Lisesi towards Fahrettin Altay | T2 | Atatürk Spor Salonu towards Halkapınar |
Location

Hocazade Camii is a light-rail station on the Konak Tram of the Tram İzmir system in İzmir, Turkey. It is located on Ali Çetinkaya Boulevard, near the Hocazade Mosque (Turkish: Hocazade Camii), from which the station gets its name. The station consists of two side platforms serving two tracks. Two blocks west of the station is Kıbrıs Şehitleri Avenue, the main street of Alsancak, with many shops, cafes, restaurants and bars.

Hocazade Camii station opened on 24 March 2018.

== Connections ==
ESHOT operates city bus service on Şair Eşref Boulevard on late night hours.

ESHOT Bus service
| Route number | Stop | Route | Location |
|---|---|---|---|
| 930 (night bus) | Hocazade Cami | Bornova — Konak | Şair Eşref Boulevard |

== Gallery ==
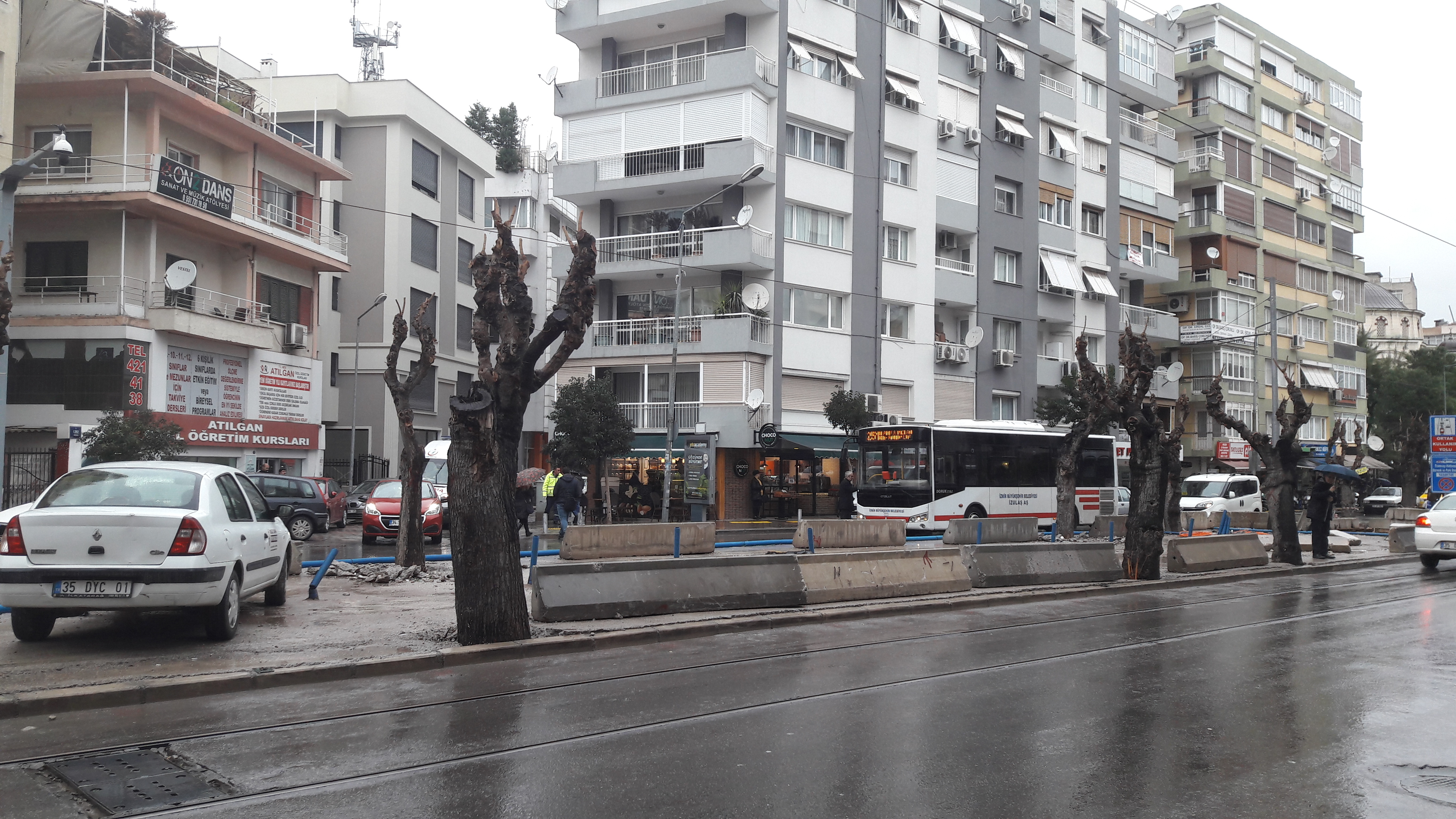
The station under construction in February 2018.

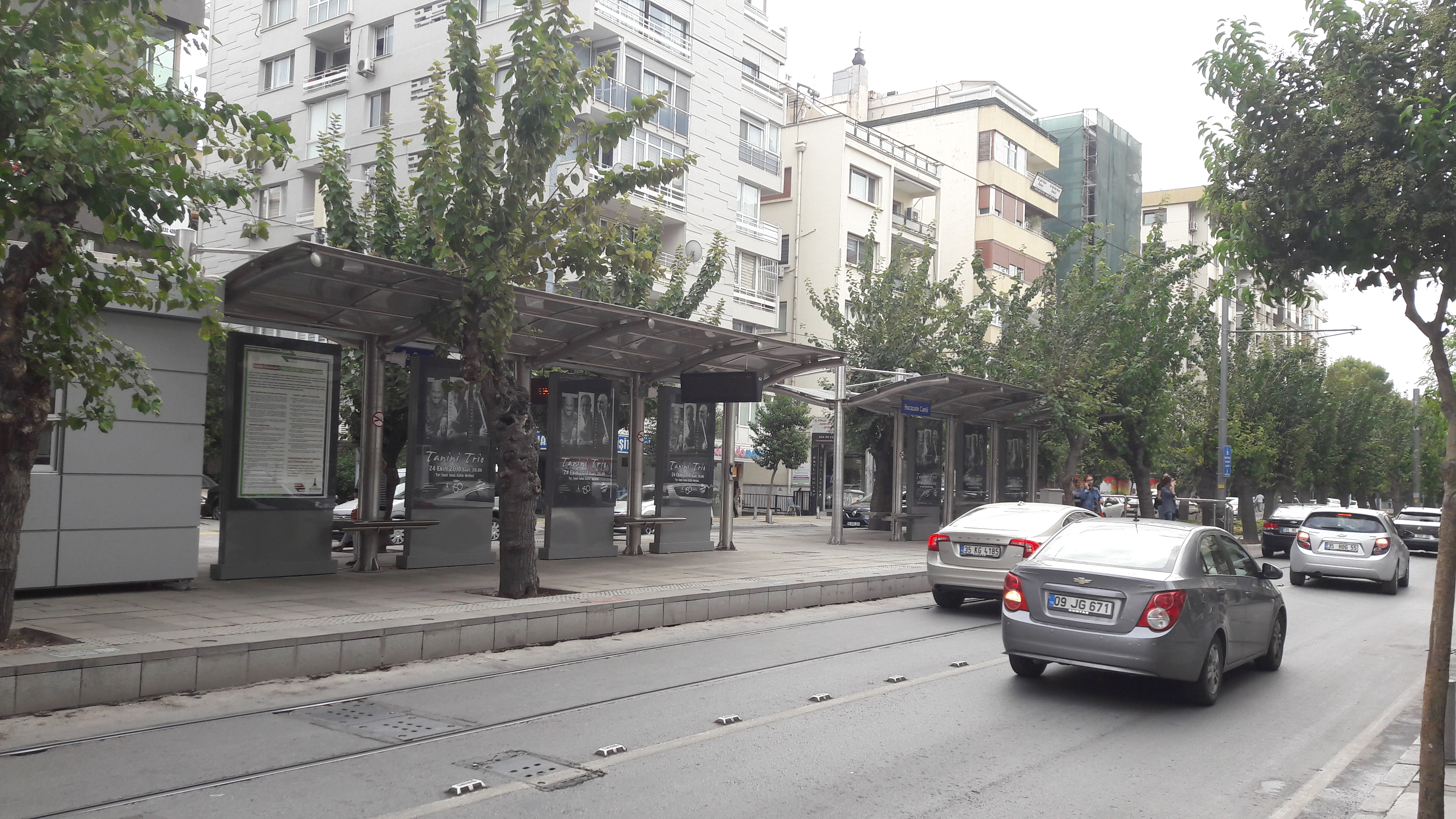
The station in September 2018, after opening.

== Nearby Places of Interest ==
- Kıbrıs Şehitleri Avenue - The main street of Alsancak
