= Göztepe =

Göztepe (watch hill in Turkish) may refer to:

- Göztepe, Kadıköy, a neighbourhood of Kadıköy district in Istanbul, Turkey
  - Göztepe railway station, a train station
  - Göztepe station (M4), a metro station
  - Göztepe Mahallesi station, a metro station
- Göztepe, Konak, a neighborhood of Konak district in İzmir, Turkey
  - Göztepe (İzmir Metro), a metro station
  - Göztepe (Tram İzmir), a tram station
  - Göztepe Pier, a ferry terminal
  - Göztepe S.K., a football (soccer) club
- Göztepe, Pazaryolu, a neighbourhood of Pazaryolu District of Erzurum Province, Turkey
