= Atatürk Spor Salonu (Tram İzmir) =

LRT station in İzmir, Turkey

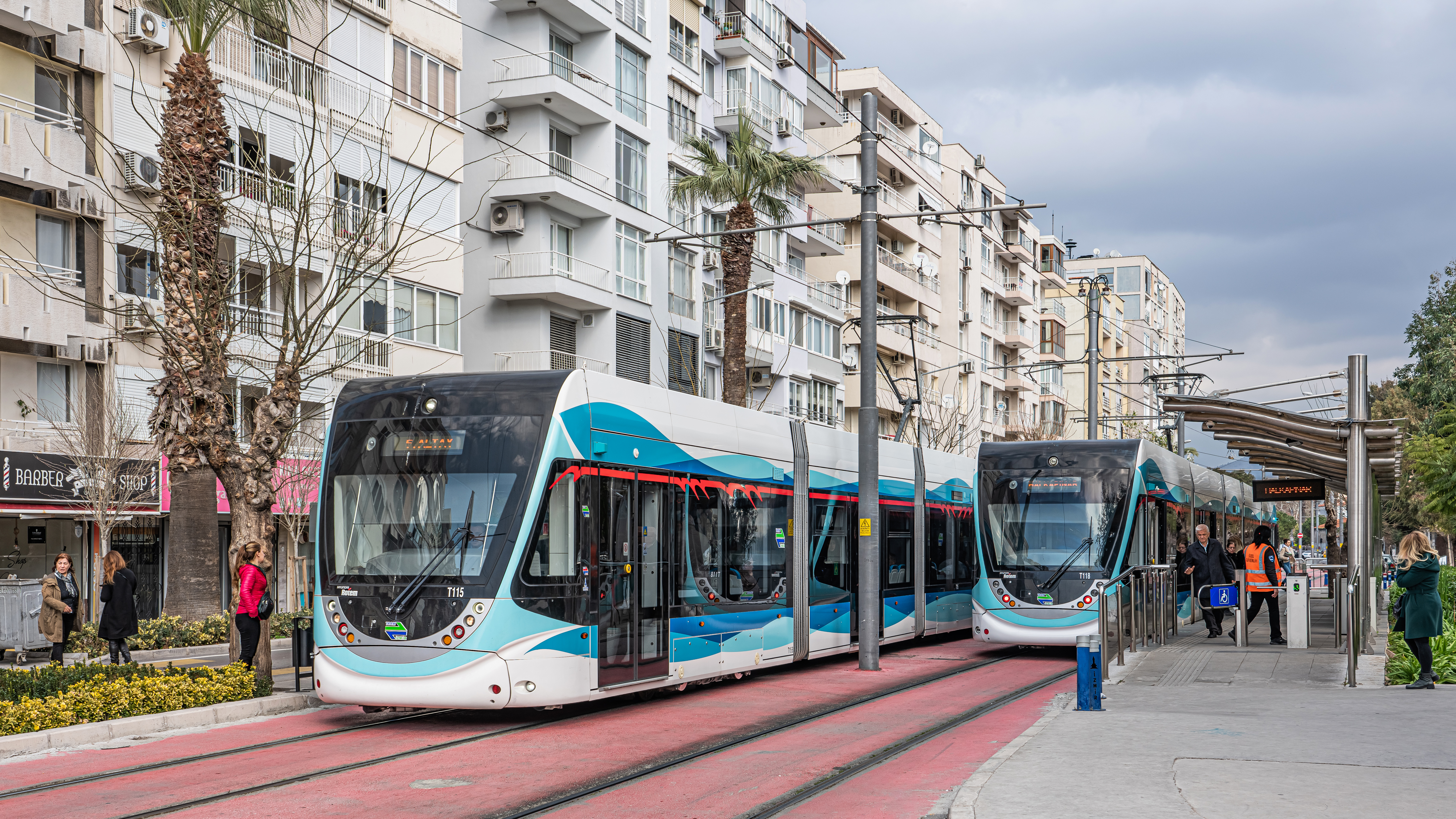

General information
- Location: Ziya Gökalp Bulvarı; Konak
- Coordinates: 38°26′04″N 27°08′50″E
- System: Tram İzmir light-rail station
- Owner: İzmir Metropolitan Municipality
- Operator: İzmir Metro A.Ş.
- Line: T2
- Platforms: 2 side platforms
- Tracks: 2

Construction
- Structure type: At-grade raised platform with paved stones
- Accessible: Yes

History
- Opened: 17 June 2018
- Electrified: 750V DC OHLE

Services
Preceding station	Tram İzmir	Following station
Hocazade Camii towards Fahrettin Altay	T2	Alsancak Gar towards Halkapınar
Location

Atatürk Spor Salonu is a light rail station on the Konak Tram line in İzmir, Turkey. This station was planned and built after the original route has been completed.

== Nearby places of interest ==
- Konak Swimming Pool
- Konak Sports Hall
