= Lozan Square =

- City square
- {{{other_names}}}
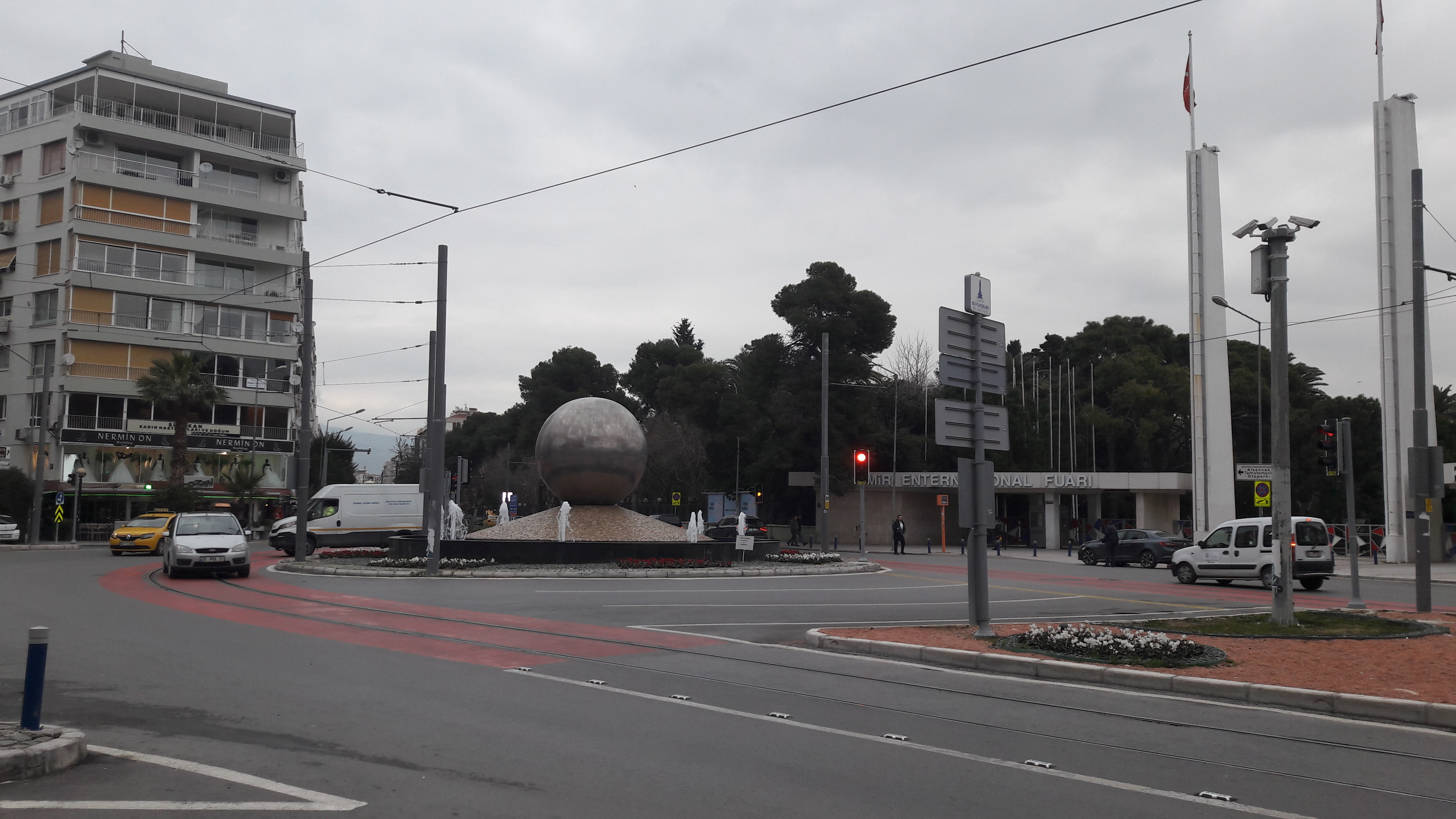
- Lozan Square in 2019.
- Design: Maurice Louis Gauthier
- Opened: 1938
- Owner: İzmir Metropolitan Municipality
- Location: Konak; İzmir, Turkey
- Interactive map of Lozan Square
- Coordinates: 38.4298°N 27.1416°E

Lozan Square (Turkish: Lozan Meydanı) is a city square and traffic roundabout in İzmir, Turkey. The square is one of three squares on the west side of the city park, Kültürpark; the other two being Montrö Square and 9 September Square. The Lozan Gate, one of five gates to the city park is located at Lozan Square. The square gets its name from the Swiss city of Lausanne (Turkish: Lozan), commemorating the signing of the Treaty of Lausanne, which ended the Turkish War of Independence. Lozan Square was opened in 1938 as part of a new city plan for İzmir, designed by French city planner Maurice Louis Gauthier.

== Location ==
Lozan Square is located in northern Konak within the Kültür neighborhood. The square itself is on Şair Eşref Boulevard, at the intersection with Vasıf Çınar and Plevne Boulevards. Gauthier's plan had square's like Lozan as meeting points between straight roads. South from Lozan, Şair Eşref Boulevard continues one block to Montrö Square, while west of Lozan, Vasıf Çınar Boulevard heads straight to the Kordon esplanade. Plevne Boulevard heads northwest to Gündoğdu Square, although Gündoğdu wasn't a part of the original 1938 plan. Atatürk Lisesi, a premier Turkish high-school is located on the southwest side of the square.

In 2017 tracks were added to the roundabout for the construction of the Konak Tram which opened in April 2018. The station Kültürpark - Atatürk Lisesi is located just south of the square.
