= Göztepe Pier =

Ferry terminal in İzmir, Turkey

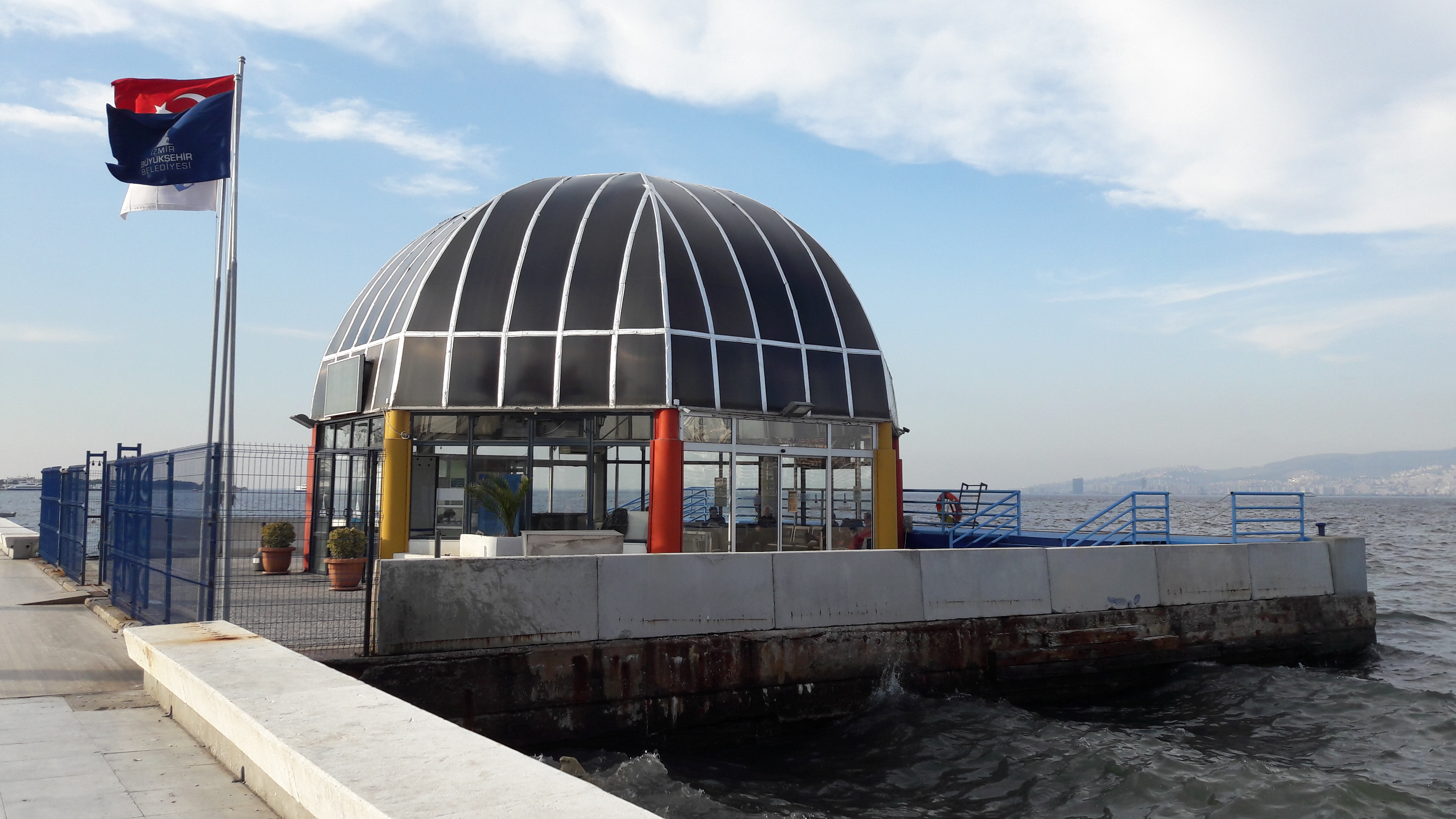

General information
- Location: Mustafa Kemal Sahil Blv., Güzelyalı Mah. 35290; Konak, İzmir; Turkey
- Coordinates: 38.3995°N 27.0834°E
- Operator: İzdeniz
- Lines: Alsancak-Üçkuyular; Karşıyaka-Karantina
- Connections: Tram İzmir at Güzelyalı

Construction
- Accessible: Yes

History
- Opened: 1884
Location

Göztepe Pier (Turkish: Göztepe iskelesi) is a passenger ferry terminal in west Konak, İzmir, on the Gulf of İzmir. Located along the Mustafa Kemal Coastal Boulevard, it is among the smallest ferry piers in İzmir, along with Bayraklı Pier. İzdeniz operates frequent commuter ferry service to Karşıyaka, Alsancak, Konak, Karantina and Üçkuyular.

Göztepe Pier was built in 1884 by the first public ferry company in İzmir, Hamidiyye. Connection to tram service at Güzelyalı station.

There is a transfer from the station to the T2 tram line.
