= Ahmed Adnan Saygun Arts Center =

Performance venue in İzmir, Turkey

- Ahmed Adnan Saygun Sanat Merkezi
- AASSM
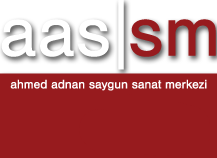

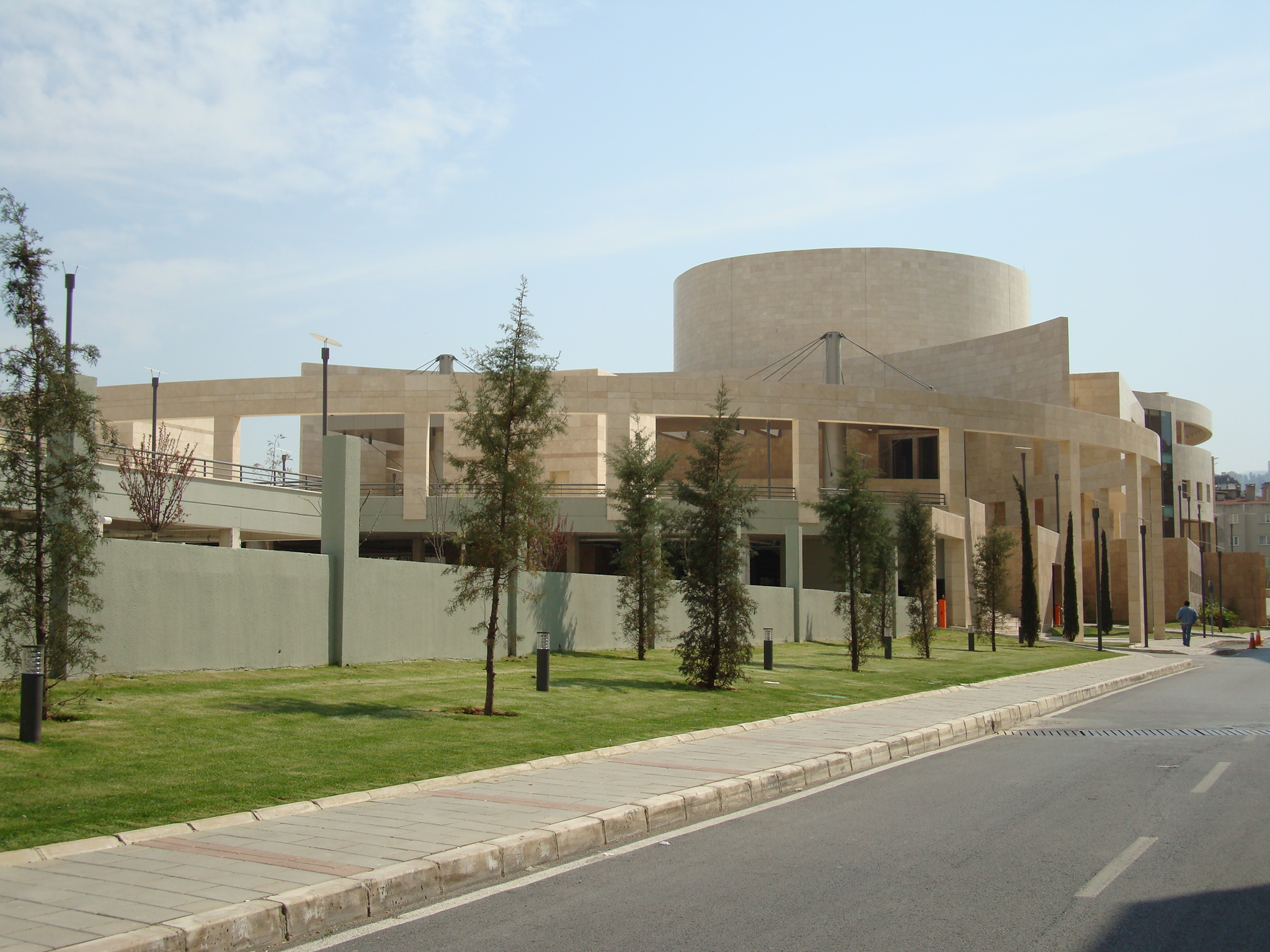
- Interactive map of Ahmed Adnan Saygun Arts Center
- Address: Mehmet Ali Akman Mah. Mithatpaşa Cad. No:1087 Konak
- Location: İzmir, Turkey
- Coordinates: 38°23′49″N 27°04′42″E
- Owner: İzmir Metropolitan Municipality
- Capacity: 1.153 (bigger hall); 243 (smaller hall)
- Public transit: Ahmed Adnan Saygun Sanat Merkezi tram stop

Construction
- Opened: 27 December 2008

Website
- www.aassm.org.tr

The Ahmed Adnan Saygun Arts Center (Turkish: Ahmed Adnan Saygun Sanat Merkezi) is situated in the Konak district of İzmir, Turkey. It is named after the composer Ahmet Adnan Saygun and was opened to public at December 27, 2008, by Yunus Emre Oratorio's concert. The Center hosts a variety of concerts and festivals. The Ahmed Adnan Saygun Arts Center is accessible via the Ahmed Adnan Saygun Sanat Merkezi stop of the Konak Tram line.

== History ==
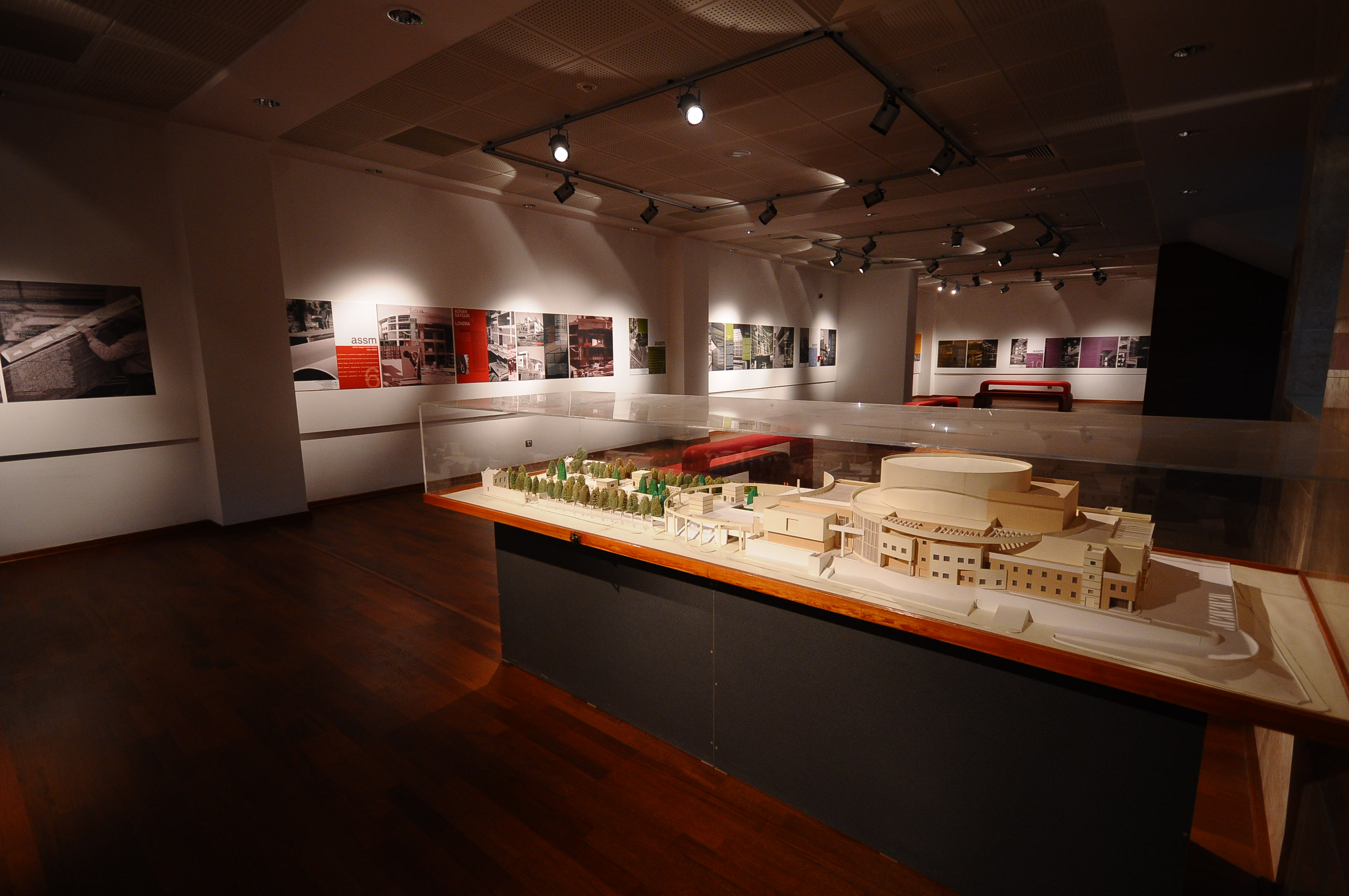
Model of the Arts Center at basement art gallery

Process of the Ahmed Adnan Saygun Arts Center started at 6 January 2000 by İzmir's deceased mayor Ahmet Piriştina, he sent an invitation letter about the topic to 6 distinguished architects from Turkey. He invited them to join the competition for new arts center that they were going to build at the site of old trolley station, Güzelyalı.

The architectural firms were: Özgür Ecevit, Ersin Pöğün, Erbil Coşkuner, Celal Koç, Tozkoparan Architecture and Doğan Tekelli-Sami Sisa(did not submit). The results were announced at June and the jury chose Tozkoparan Architecture among other 5 teams.

Almost collapsed and abandoned Old Tram Depots's restoration projects were also included in the requirements of the project. Tozkopara Architecture worked with engineering with the topics of engineering, acoustic and venue planning.

- Project date: 2000–2001
- Construction date: 2006–2009

== Context ==
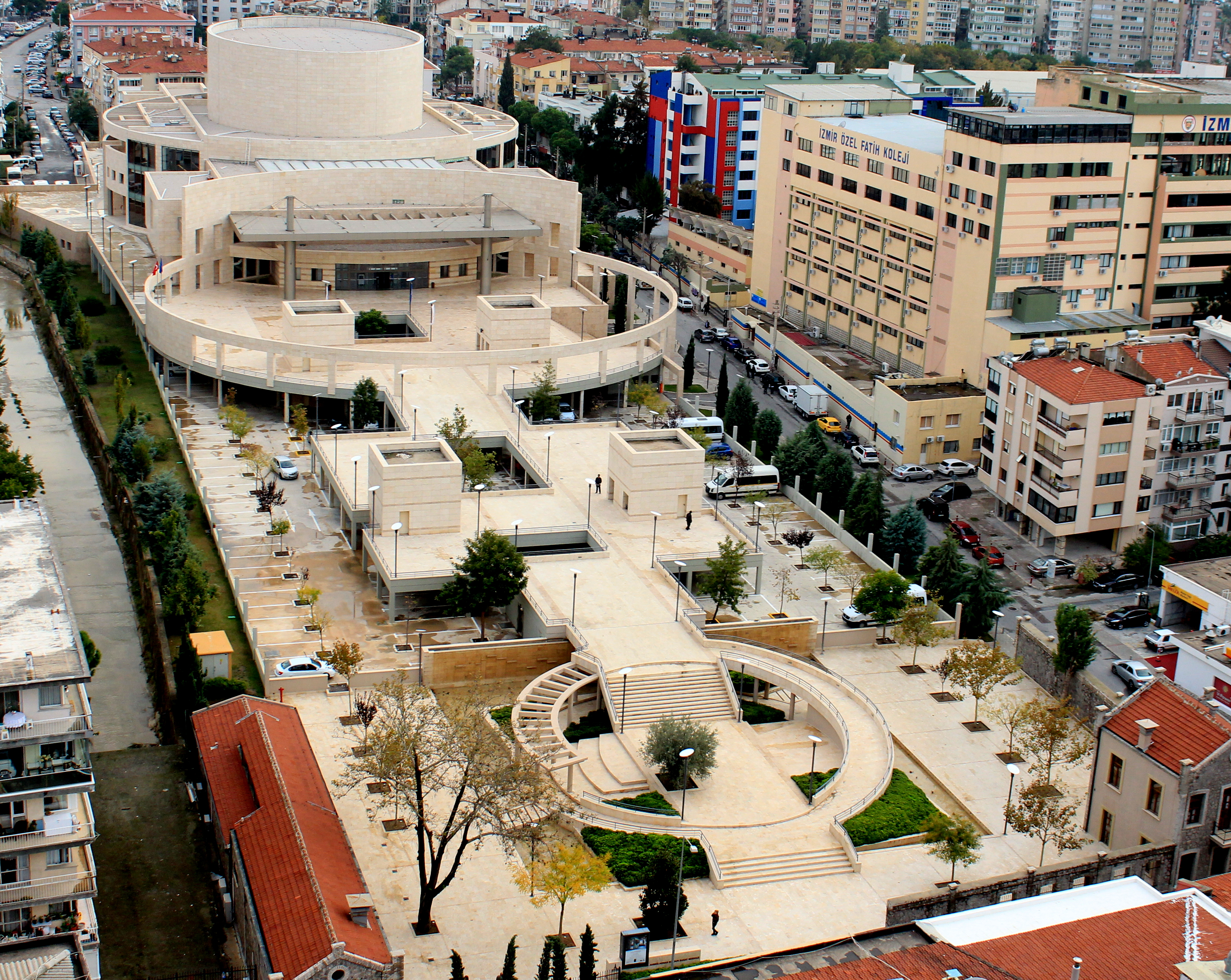
Urban relation

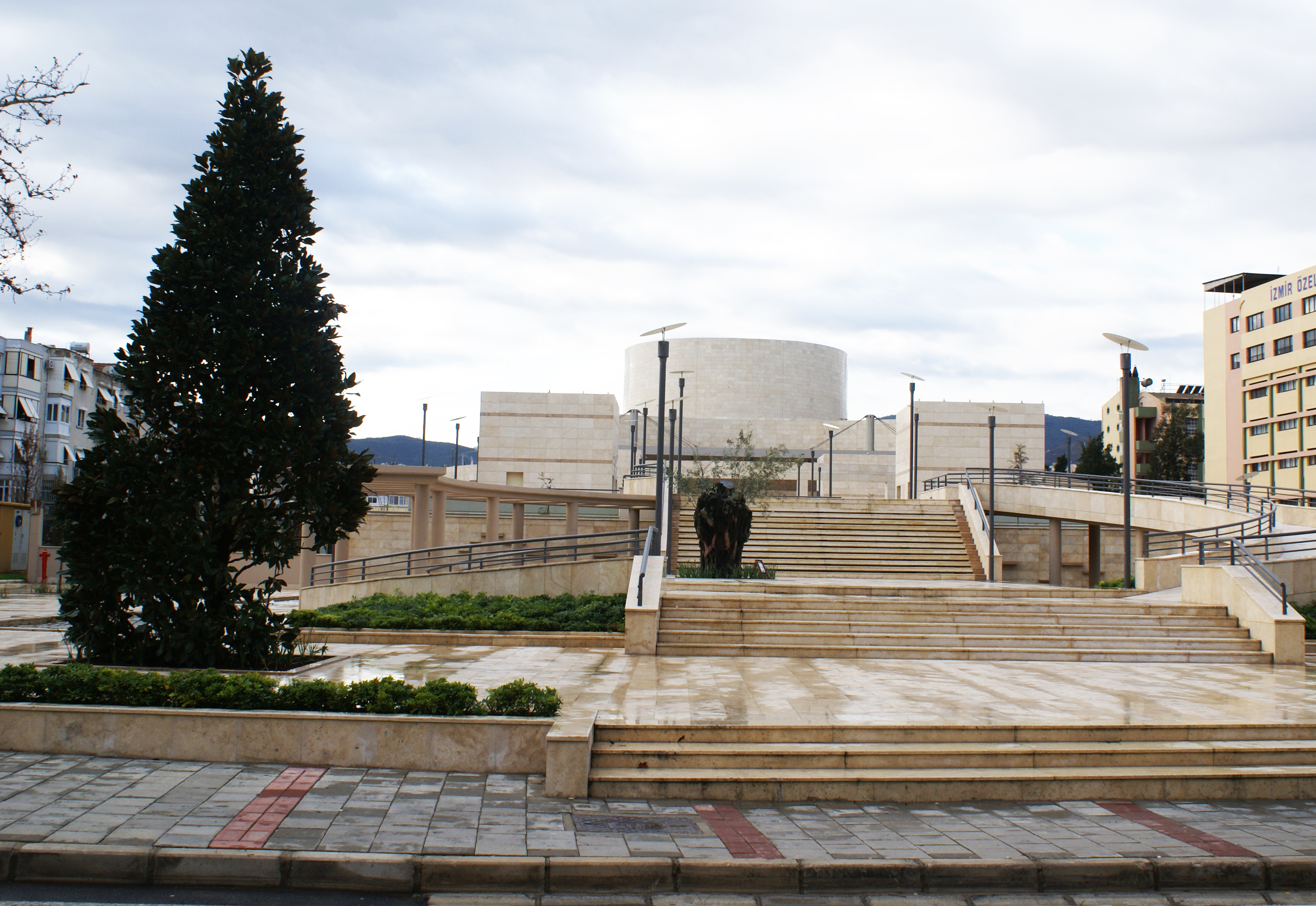
North facade

The venue is in one of the most popular residential areas in İzmir. It is situated at the Mithatpaşa Street which is one of the central streets of İzmir. There is 3 entrance: VIP entrance, main entrance and artist entrance. The Front(North) facade of it is closer to sea and it has a direct connection to Mithatpaşa Street. South and East elevations is surrounded by residential buildings. West Elevation is across a private school and a gasoline station. T

== Formal ==
Ahmed Adnan Saygun Arts Center's plot area is 19.000 m2 and its closed area is 29.500 m2. There are two concert halls, five art galleries, open air performance areas, restored buildings. It does not serve as a theater because it does not fit requirements. The bigger hall is an 1150-seater and it has ten entrances which are distributed across three floors. The smaller hall is a 250-seater and it has four entrances to it. Each of them have one backstage.

Four art galleries are symmetrical and they are on top of each other. They have the same area at ground and first floors. The fifth is at basement(-1) floor, under the main entrance and it has a different plan to the others. Other parts of the complex include the administration offices, artists rooms and circulation areas. Restored old tramp depots at each side of the plot's entrance, are used as a restaurant and an academy.

== Spatial experience ==
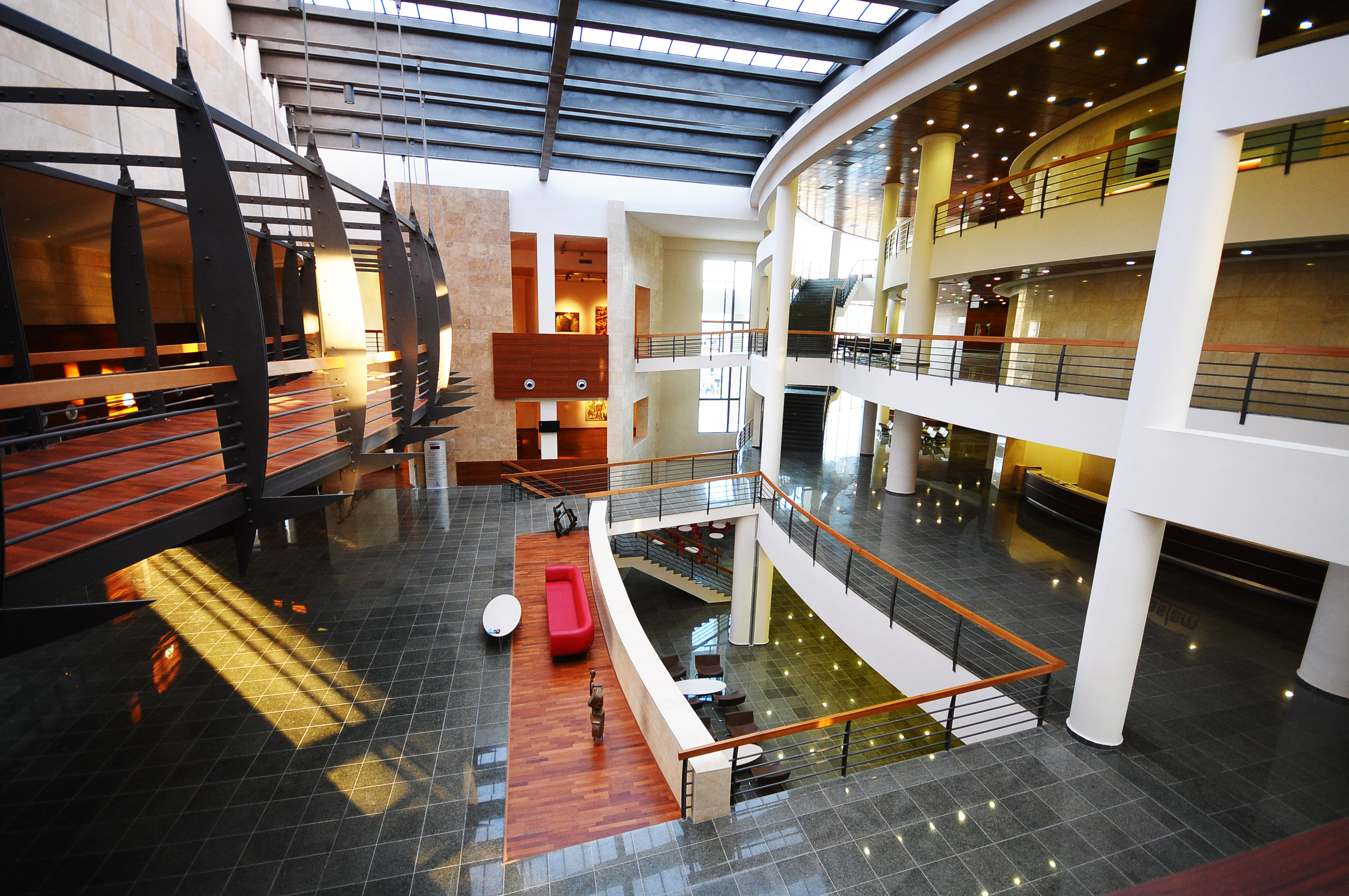
Main entrance

A 250 year old olive tree is located at the entrance, leading to a fountain and a pond situated under and both sides of the stairs that take you to the entrance hall. Pond is inspired from Yunus Emre Oratorio. At the front of the main entrance hall, there is a circular area and at the east side of it Ahmed Adnan Saygun's statue Inside, there are identical art galleries left and right, ground and 1st floor. The entrances to the small and big concert hall are visible the help of the double height space and balconies of the 1st and 2nd floor. There are 2 staircases on each side leading to the -1 floor, 1st and 2nd floor. Back side of the building is full of administration, management, soloist, artist, VIP and technical rooms. s. At the basement level there is the small concert hall, artist rooms, technical staff rooms and the 5th art gallery. Ground floor consists of 2 art galleries, 4 entrances to big concert hall, backstage, administration rooms, technical staff rooms.2 art galleries, symmetrical to each other, 4 another entrances to big concert hall, management room, soloist rooms are all in the 1st floor. Lastly 2nd floor has excess to balcony of the big concert hall and VIP rooms.

Art galleries at the 1st floor are connected to each other with suspended bridge.

== Structure and material qualities ==
Bright brown and cream colored marble cladding outdoors blend into the city. In the indoors marble colored reinforced concrete, laminate and steel are used together to create a welcoming space. Steel suspended bridge hangs at the main entrance of the building. Load bearing columns can be seen from inside and they create verticality and separate spaces. Large glass windows and steel-glass roof let the light in to the main hall.
