= Kültür, Konak =

Kültür
- Neighbourhood
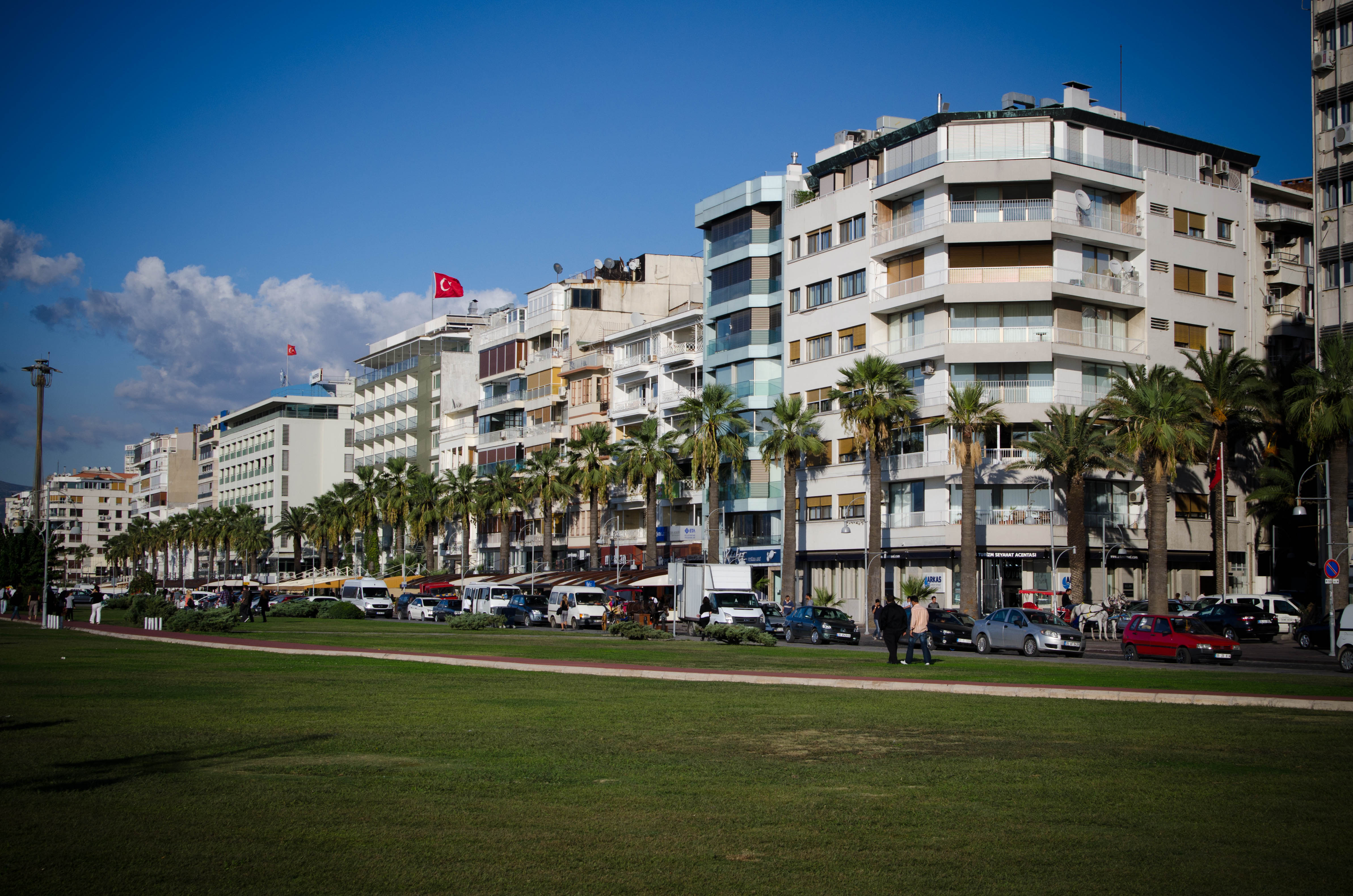
- Apartments on the city's iconic Kordon seashore

- Location within Turkey Location within İzmir
- Coordinates: 38°25′55″N 27°08′22″E
- Country: Turkey
- Province: İzmir
- District: Konak

Government
  - Muhtar: Nilgün Güney
- Area: 0.5 km^{2} (0.19 sq mi)
- Elevation: 10 m (33 ft)
- Population (2022): 8,234
  - Density: 16,000/km^{2} (43,000/sq mi)
- Time zone: UTC+3 (TRT)
- Postal code: 35220
- Area code: 0232

Kültür is a neighbourhood in the municipality and district of Konak, İzmir Province, Turkey. Its population is 8,234 (2022). It is a residential and commercial neighborhood, consisting of mostly medium-density apartments for upper-middle class to upper-class residents. Despite being a separate neighborhood, Kültür is commonly referred to as Alsancak as the official name of the neighborhood is used mainly in addresses or on official listings.

== Overview ==
Kültür stretches from the eastern shore of the Gulf of İzmir, consisting of the southern half of the Kordon esplanade, to the Kültürpark city park and constitutes most of the area burned down in the Great Fire of Smyrna in 1922. A new plan for area was drawn up in a 1924 city plan designed by French urban planner, Henri Prost. The southern half of the neighborhood consists of a grid plan, while the northern half is more mixed. The large majority of buildings are residential apartments, with an average height of 6 to 8 floors. The ground floor of most buildings usually consist of cafes and shops, promoting pedestrian traffic along the smaller streets of the neighborhood. Among these streets are one of İzmir's most prominent shopping streets, Gül Street (Turkish: Gül Sokak).

=== Government ===
Kültür is within the jurisdiction of the Konak Municipality (Turkish: Konak Belediyesi), which is responsible for district-wide public services such as garbage removal or ambulance service. However Kültür maintains its own small office for neighborhood related issues. The head of this office is a Muhtar and answers directly to the Konak Municipality. As of November 2017, Nilgin Güney is the Muhtar of Kültür. The Kültür Muhtar office is located in front of the Gazi elementary school on Şevket Özçelik Street.

=== Population ===
Kültür is the 7th most populous neighborhood in Konak, with a population of 8,234 as of 2022.

Historical population
Year	Pop.	±% p.a.
2007	9,421	—
2012	9,199	−0.48%
2017	9,016	−0.40%
2022	8,234	−1.80%
Source: TÜIK (2007-2022)

== Parks and Squares ==
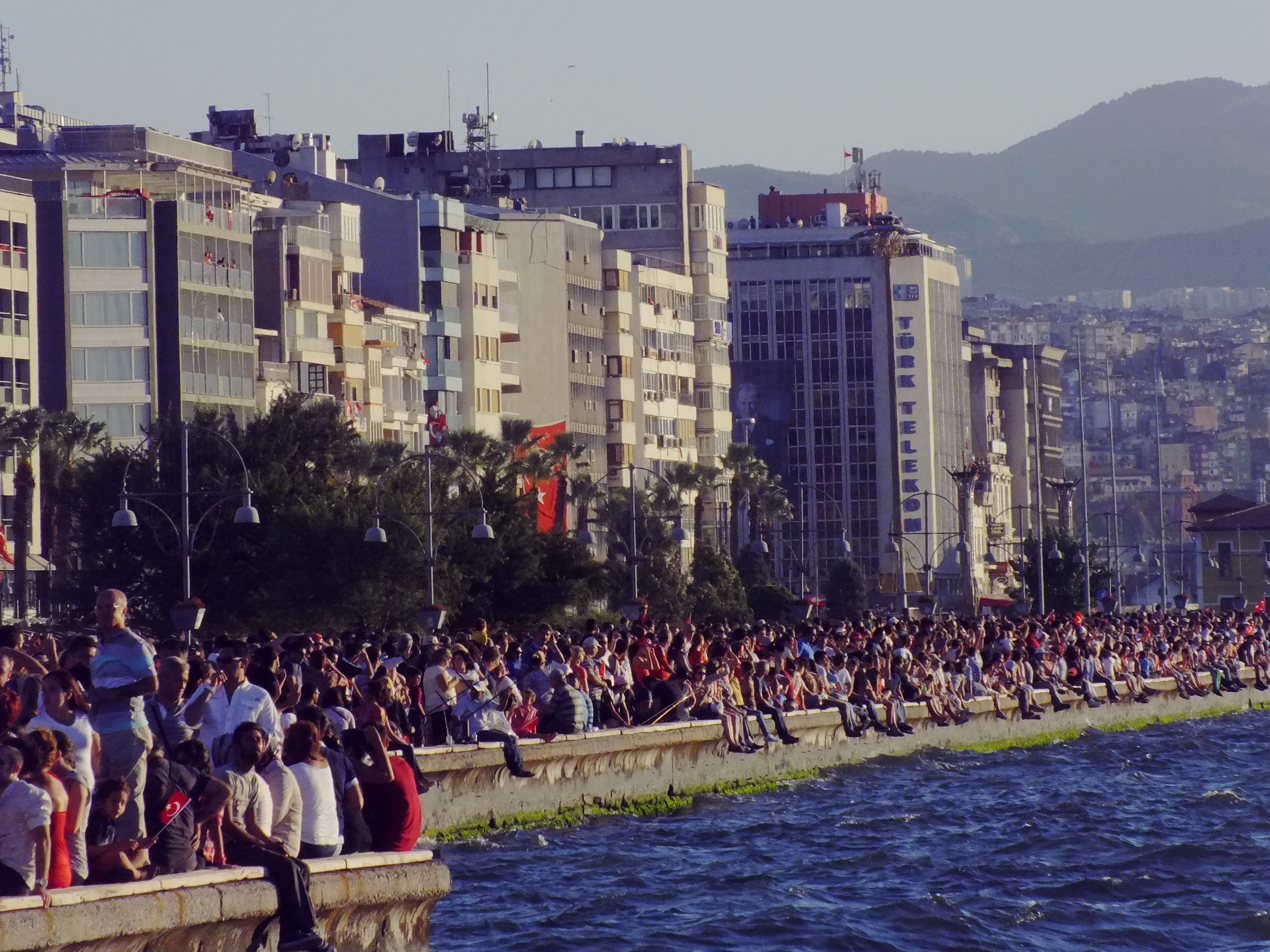
Kordon on the 9th of September celebrations.

The most famous park in Kültür, as well as all of İzmir, is the Kordon esplanade. The southern half of this coastal park is located within Kültür. Concerts, demonstrations and political rallies are common here, along with general recreation. The park has jogging and bicycle paths along with regular leisure paths and many cafes and restaurants are situated on the east side of the park.

One of the city's largest central parks, Kültürpark, is located just east of Kültür across Şair Eşref Boulevard.

The neighborhood also borders five city squares, three of which form the corner boundaries of Kültür. Cumhuriyet Square is located in the southwestern part of the neighborhood, while Gündoğdu Square is at the northwestern part. Both of these squares are open pedestrian spaces, with statues commemorating the Turkish War of Independence in their respective centers. Lausanne Square is a roundabout in front of the Kültürpark's Lausanne Gate (Turkish: Lozan Kapısı), serving as an intersection between Şair Eşref, Plevne and Vasıf Çınar Boulevards. Just south of Lausanne Square is Montreux Square which is situated at the southeastern part of Kültür. Montreux Square is another roundabout in front of Kültürpark's Montreux Gate (Turkish: Montrö Kapısı) and serves as an intersection between Şair Nevres, Şehit Nevres and Dr. Refik Saydam Boulevards. The smallest of the five squares is Altay Square, located on the southeastern side of Talatpaşa Boulevard. The square consists of a small city park.

== Transportation ==
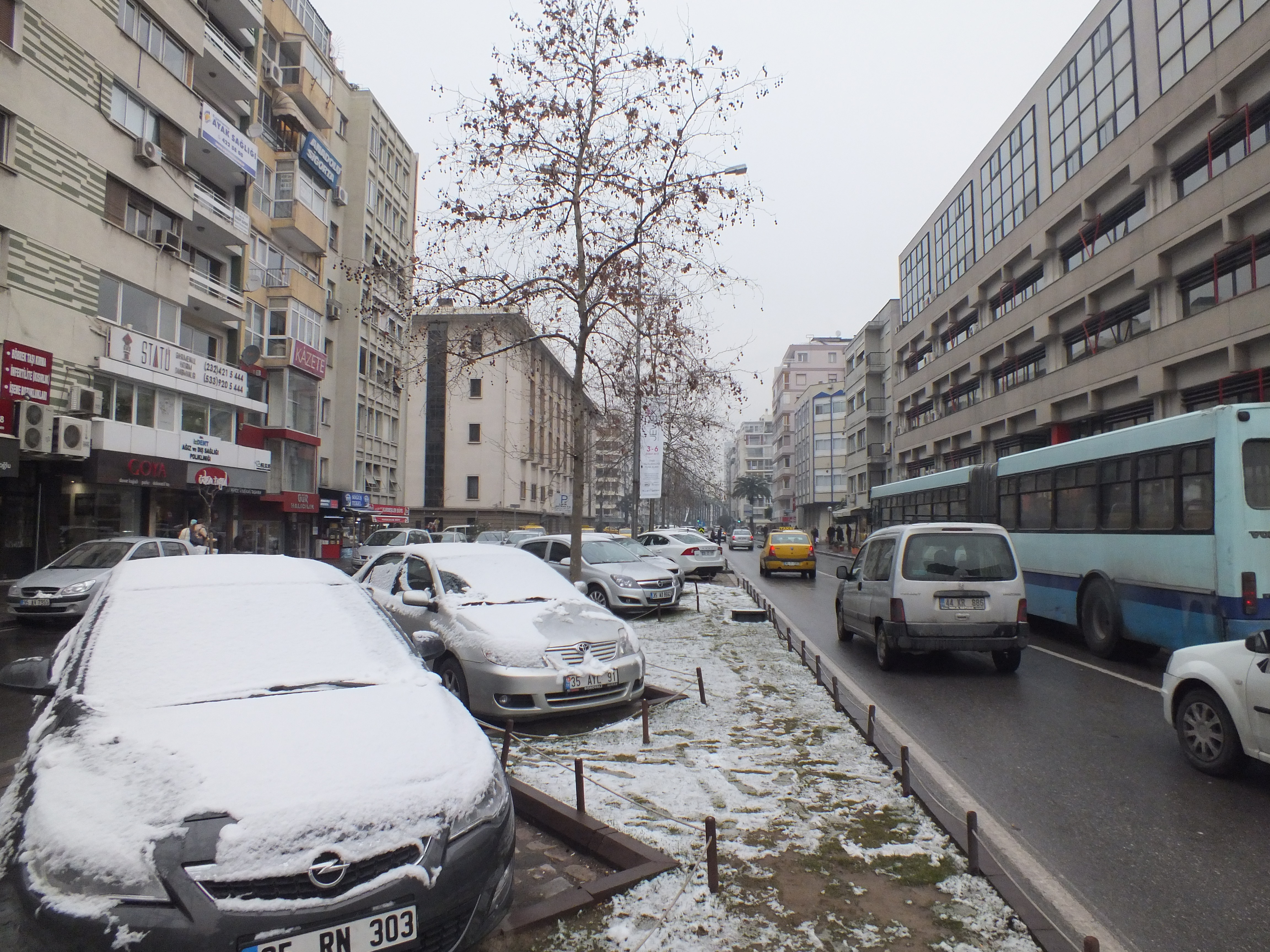
Cumhuriyet Boulevard

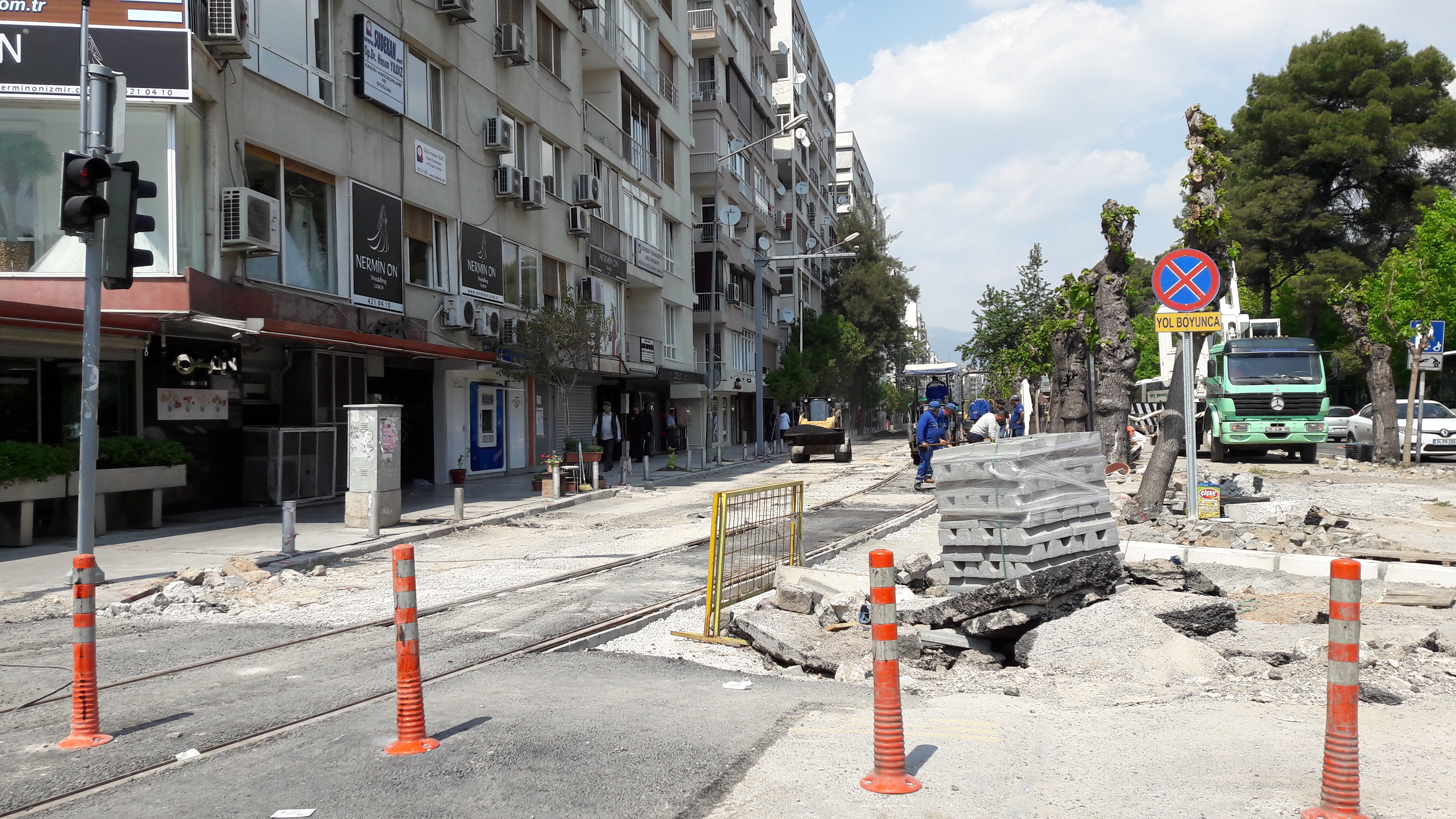
Construction of the Konak tram line in April 2017.

Kültür has three major boulevards running through the neighborhood that are part of two throughways. Cumhuriyet Boulevard enters the neighborhood at Cumhuriyet Square and runs through the western part of Kültür, adjacent to Kordon. At the intersection with Dr. Mustafa Enver Bey Avenue, the Talatpaşa Boulevard diverges northeast, along with most through-traffic. Talapaşa Boulevard consists of the northern border of the neighborhood, until it merges with Şair Eşref Boulevard, just south of Alsancak railway station. Şair Eşref Boulevard is the third main road in the neighborhood, running along Kültür's eastern border. The boulevard enters Kültür at Montreux Square and continues north until the intersection with Talatpaşa Boulevard.

Parking is a problem within the neighborhood, as lack of parking spaces, a high-density population along with the neighborhood being a well-known shopping area, lead to illegal double parking or parking in no-standing areas. Even though some alleys, between apartment buildings, serve as a driveway for residents of the respective building, it isn't sufficient to meet the parking demands of the area. During off-hours, Gazi Elementary School and Atatürk High-school uses their respective school yards as a parking lots.

ESHOT operates several bus routes along the aforementioned throughways. The majority of these bus routes operate between Halkapınar and central Konak, however many other routes operate to other districts of the city, such as Bornova, Buca, Karşıyaka, Balçova or Gaziemir. Bus routes along Şair Eşref Boulevard are: 63, 70, 80, 90, 252, 255, 581, 802, 930; while bus routes along Talatpaşa and Cumhuriyet Boulevards are: 12, 121, 253, 920.

The Konak Tram line, under construction since November 2016, will have two stations within Kültür on Şair Eşref Boulevard; Fuar and Alsancak Camii. The tram will run north to Halkapınar and south to Fahrettin Altay, along the southern shore of the Gulf of İzmir. The tram line is expected to enter service by the end of 2017.

The closest metro stations to Kültür are Çankaya and Basmane, which are both located approximately 700 m (2,300 ft) south of the neighborhood.

== Education ==
Kültür has a total of four schools, three public and one private, along with the rectorate of the Dokuz Eylül University.

- Atatürk High-school - One of the most prestigious high-schools in Turkey.
- Nevvar Salih İşgören Technical High-school
- Tevrik Fikret High-school - Private high-school.
- Gazi Elementary School
- Dokuz Eylül University rectorate

== List of Streets ==
=== Boulevards ===
- Ali Çetinkaya Blvd. (Street view)
- Cumhuriyet Blvd. (Street View)
- Plevne Blvd. (Street view)
- Şair Nevres Blvd. (Street view)
- Şehit Nevres Blvd. (Street view)
- Talatpaşa Blvd. (Street view)
- Vasıf Çınar Blvd. (Street view)

=== Avenues ===
- Atatürk Ave. (Street view)
- Dr. Mustafa Enver Bey Ave. (Street view)
- Kızılay Ave. (Street view)

=== Streets ===
- Bedia Muvahhit St. (Street view)
- Mexico St. (Street view)
- Mustafa Münir Birsel St. (Street view)
- Şevket Özçelik St. (Street view)
- Zuhal Yorgancıoğlu St. (Street view)
- 1375th St. (Street view)
- 1377th St. (Street view)
- 1380th St. (Street view)
- 1381st St. (Street view)
- 1382nd St. (Gül Street) (Street view)
- 1383rd St. (Street view)
- 1387th St. (Street view)
- 1388th St. (Street view)
- 1389th St. (Street view)
- 1390th St. (Street view)
- 1391st St. (Street view)
- 1392nd St. (Street view)
- 1407th St. (Street view)
- 1434th St. (Street view)
- 1436th St. (Street view)
- 1437th St. (Street view)
- 1438th St. (Street view)
