= Mustafa Kemal Coastal Boulevard =

Major thoroughfare in İzmir, Turkey

- Kordon Yolu
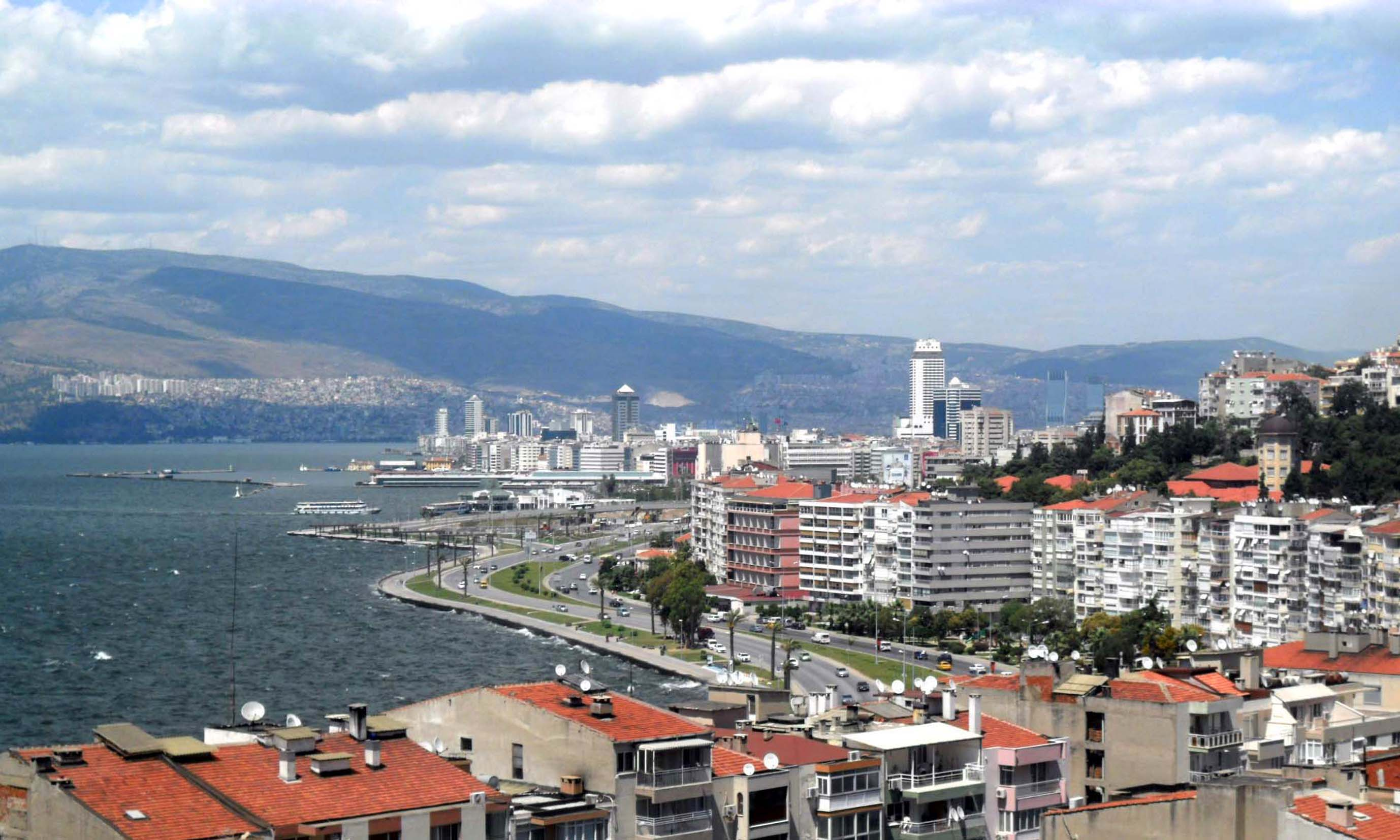
- The boulevard seen from Asansör.
- Interactive map of Mustafa Kemal Coastal Boulevard
- Native name: Mustafa Kemal Sahil Bulvarı (Turkish)
- Namesake: Mustafa Kemal Atatürk
- Owner: City of İzmir
- Maintained by: İzmir Metropolitan Municipality
- Length: 6.6 km (4.1 mi)
- Location: Konak, İzmir
- West end: O-32 O-32 in Üçkuyular
- Major junctions: Halil Rıfat Avenue in Konak; Fevzi Paşa Boulevard in Çankaya
- East end: Cumhuriyet Boulevard in Çankaya

Construction
- Commissioned: 1976
- Construction start: 1981
- Completion: 1990

The Mustafa Kemal Coastal Boulevard (Turkish: Mustafa Kemal Sahil Bulvarı) is a major thoroughfare in İzmir, Turkey. Consisting of six lanes, it stretches from Cumhuriyet Boulevard in Çankaya to the İzmir-Çeşme motorway in Üçkuyular, running along the southeastern coast of the Gulf of İzmir.

The road was one of the city's first major projects at restructuring and improving İzmir's existing road network. The route was constructed upon reclaimed land, due to lack of space on the pre-existing coast, and built as a six-lane boulevard. Considered an urban extension of the Çeşme motorway, the Mustafa Kemal Coastal Boulevard was originally planned to continue north into Alsancak along the shore, then turn east and connect to the D.300 and D.550 state highways in Halkapınar. This part of the project was never built, due to public opposition, and the land originally reclaimed in Alsancak for the boulevard was converted into an esplanade.

== Route Description ==
Mustafa Kemal Coastal Boulevard begins at an intersection with Cumhuriyet and Fevzi Paşa Boulevards in Çankaya. From there it diverges off the former path of Cumhuriyet Boulevard into Konak, which was converted into a pedestrian walkway, and heads southwest. It winds around government office buildings until passing under the Konak Underpass, which unites the Konak shore park with Konak Square. After coming out of the underpass, the boulevard shares a trumpet interchange with Halil Rıfat Paşa Avenue and the Konak Tunnel. Following the interchange, the boulevard turns west and runs directly along the coast with the Konak Tram and a wide pedestrian walkway on its north side.

An intersection with 303rd Street provides access to the inner Mithatpaşa Avenue, which parallels most of the boulevard. The boulevard then heads underground again at the Mithatpaşa Underpass, passing under the 15 July Democracy Square. Following the underpass, the northbound tram track is on the south side of the route, which crosses the boulevard while it passes through the underpass. The route then slightly turns south until coming to central Göztepe, where it straightens west again. In Göztepe, the boulevard passes under the Güzelyalı Bridge. Shortly after, the boulevard passes in front of the İzmir Air Training Command and ends at an intersection with Haydar Aliyev Boulevard and Ali Resmi Turan Avenue. Following the intersection, the boulevard transitions in the İzmir-Çeşme motorway to Çeşme.

== History ==
The history of the Mustafa Kemal Coastal Boulevard dates back to 1973, when the Ministry of Public Works released the Metropolitan Area Masterplan (Turkish: Metropoliten Nazım İmar Planı). Within the plan was a large coastal boulevard, beginning in İnciraltı and terminating in Bostanlı. This route would traverse the entire eastern shore of the Gulf of İzmir and would be built on reclaimed land. Two years later, the İzmir Municipality put forth plans to build a six-lane road from Üçkuyular (near İnciraltı) to central Konak, based on the 1973 masterplan. The plan was approved by the Ministry of Public Works in 1976 and preparations began shortly after.

Construction began in 1981 and was completed in 1990. The construction of the boulevard also reshaped Konak Square. The existing boulevard that ran between the İzmir Clock Tower and the Konak Governor's Building was moved about 160 m (520 ft) west onto reclaimed land, thus enlarging Konak Square and turning the area into a pedestrian zone. Before the boulevard was opened in 1989, construction of the İzmir-Çeşme motorway began and the west end of the boulevard was chosen to be the motorway's eastern end. The motorway opened in 1991.

In 2000 the construction of a trumpet interchange just south of Konak Square began. This interchange would better allow access into the interior of Konak and Varyant. Furthermore, in 2002, a short section of the boulevard was moved underground to allow for the construction of a wide pedestrian overpass. This overpass made possible the direct access to the Konak shore park and ferry terminal with Konak Square. Construction of the interchange was halted for several years until being completed in 2006. The interchange connected to Halil Rıfat Paşa Avenue, which connected to United Nations Avenue, providing access uphill to Üçyol.

In 2011 construction of the Konak Tunnel began, which would provide a direct link between Mustafa Kemal Coastal Boulevard and the D.300/D.550 state highways and Homeros Boulevard on the other side of Kadifekale hill. Halil Rıfat Paşa Avenue was redesigned and the four-lane roadway continued into the tunnel, directly from the interchange with the coastal boulevard. Konak Tunnel opened on 25 May 2015.

=== Konak Tram and Mithatpaşa Underpass ===
Mustafa Kemal Coastal Boulevard was chosen to host the planned Konak Tram line, which would run along the entire length of the boulevard from Çankaya to Üçkuyular. Together with the tram line, a new underpass was to be constructed under Mithatpaşa Avenue to make way for a pedestrian plaza, similar to the one in Konak. Construction of this plaza began in September 2015 and construction of the tram began about a year later, in the summer of 2016. The tram line would run along the northwest side (sea side) of the boulevard and the existing pedestrian walkway would be further expanded to make room and ten stations would also be constructed on the boulevard. The Mithatpaşa underpass opened on 23 December 2017, while the plaza above was still under construction. Construction of the tram line was mostly complete by 2018 and finally opened to the public on 24 April 2018.

=== The Konak-Halkapınar section (cancelled) ===
With half of the originally planned route finished, plans to extend the boulevard north of Konak, through Alsancak, to Halkapınar were put in motion. However, these plans met heavy opposition from the start. Just like the Konak-Üçkuyular section of the route, the Konak-Halkapınar section would continue north along the coast on reclaimed land to the tip of Alsancak where it would then turn east and connect to the D.300 highway at Halkapınar. However, this would see the demolition of the historic Pasaport Quay as well as change the coastal cityscape of İzmir's historic center.

The extension was approved by the Ministry of Public Works on 15 November 1996, however the section between Konak and Cumhuriyet Squares was to be further studied and thus construction was delayed. In February 1997 the İzmir Board of Architects requested that the entire shore from Konak to Alsancak be declared a protected, historical area. (Turkish: sit alanı) However, when their request was refused, the board then took their case to the Provincial Court. Despite the ensuing court case, construction between Alsancak and Cumhuriyet Square began on 1 April 1997. in 1998 the section between Konak and Cumhuriyet Squares was declared a protected, historical zone thus the existing plan needed to be cancelled and revived. Later that year, the entire shoreline from Konak to Alsancak was also declared a protected zone.

On 17 April 1999 Ahmet Piriştina was elected mayor of İzmir and vowed to continue the construction of the boulevard in accordance with the law. Following his statement, all construction of the boulevard was halted. Following months of discussion in the city council, the plans for the boulevard were officially cancelled in December 1999. A new plan to convert the reclaimed land into a large city park was approved on 18 May 2000. The park was completed a few months later and officially opened to the public on 16 September 2000.

Since the northernmost section of the planned route near the Port of İzmir was nearly complete and outside of the protected area, it was completed and opened to traffic in 2000. This section was later named Liman Avenue.
