= Fahrettin Altay (Tram İzmir) =

LRT station in İzmir, Turkey

General information
- Location: Ş. B. Ali Resmi Tufan Cd., Mehmet Ali Akman Mah., 35330; Konak
- Coordinates: 38.3982°N 27.0693°E
- System: Tram İzmir light-rail station
- Owner: İzmir Metropolitan Municipality
- Operator: İzmir Metro A.Ş.
- Line: T2
- Platforms: 2 side platforms
- Tracks: 2
- Connections: İzmir Metro at F. Altay; ESHOT Bus: Fahrettin Altay Meydan 2: 5, 6, 7, 24, 25, 202, 311, 480, 510, 551, 650, 811, 945, 950, 977; Fahrettin Altay Meydan 3: 8, 10, 17, 671, 690, 873, 969; Fahrettin Altay Meydan 5: 5, 6, 7, 10, 24, 25, 202, 480, 486, 510, 650, 977; Fahrettin Altay Meydan 6: 517, 681, 811, 879, 950; Fahrettin Altay Meydan 7: 517, 681, 879, 950; Fahrettin Altay Meydan 8: 311, 551, 945, 946; Fahrettin Altay Meydan 9: 5, 6, 7, 10, 24, 25, 82, 167, 202, 305, 311, 321, 480, 510, 551, 650, 675, 684, 883, 909, 945, 946, 971, 975, 977, 981, 982, 983, 984, 985, 987

Construction
- Accessible: Yes

History
- Opened: 24 March 2018
- Electrified: 750V DC OHLE

Services
Preceding station	Tram İzmir	Following station
Terminus	T2	Üçkuyular towards Halkapınar
Track layout
Location

Fahrettin Altay is a light-rail station on the Konak Tram of the Tram İzmir system in İzmir, Turkey. Located along Şehit Babası Ali Resmi Tufan Avenue, near Fahrettin Altay Square, it is the current western terminus of the line. Connection to the İzmir Metro is available at Fahrettin Altay station.

Fahrettin Altay station opened on 24 March 2018.

== Connections ==
ESHOT operates city bus service on Fahrettin Altay Square.

ESHOT Bus service
Route number	Stop	Route	Location
5	Fahrettin Altay Meydan 2, Fahrettin Altay Meydan 5, Fahrettin Altay Meydan 9	Narlıdere — Üçkuyular İskele	Fahrettin Altay Square
6	Fahrettin Altay Meydan 2, Fahrettin Altay Meydan 5, Fahrettin Altay Meydan 9	Arıkent — Üçkuyular İskele	Fahrettin Altay Square
7	Fahrettin Altay Meydan 2, Fahrettin Altay Meydan 5, Fahrettin Altay Meydan 9	Sahilevleri — Üçkuyular İskele	Fahrettin Altay Square
8	Fahrettin Altay Meydan 3	Güzelbahçe — F. Altay Aktarma Merkezi	Fahrettin Altay Square
10	Fahrettin Altay Meydan 3, Fahrettin Altay Meydan 5, Fahrettin Altay Meydan 9	Üçkuyular İskele — Konak	Fahrettin Altay Square
17	Fahrettin Altay Meydan 3	Uzundere Toplu Konutları — F. Altay Aktarma Merkezi	Fahrettin Altay Square
24	Fahrettin Altay Meydan 2, Fahrettin Altay Meydan 5, Fahrettin Altay Meydan 9	Kavacık — Üçkuyular İskele	Fahrettin Altay Square
25	Fahrettin Altay Meydan 2, Fahrettin Altay Meydan 5, Fahrettin Altay Meydan 9	Oyunlar Köyü — Üçkuyular İskele	Fahrettin Altay Square
82	Fahrettin Altay Meydan 9	Siteler — F. Altay Aktarma Merkezi	Fahrettin Altay Square
167	Fahrettin Altay Meydan 9	Balçova Kabristan — F. Altay Aktarma Merkezi	Fahrettin Altay Square
202	Fahrettin Altay Meydan 2, Fahrettin Altay Meydan 5, Fahrettin Altay Meydan 9	Cumhuriyet Meydanı — Havalimanı (Airport)	Fahrettin Altay Square
305	Fahrettin Altay Meydan 9	2. İnönü Mahallesi — F. Altay Aktarma Merkezi	Fahrettin Altay Square
311	Fahrettin Altay Meydan 2, Fahrettin Altay Meydan 8, Fahrettin Altay Meydan 9	İnciraltı — F. Altay	Fahrettin Altay Square
321	Fahrettin Altay Meydan 9	Çamlı — F. Altay Aktarma Merkezi	Fahrettin Altay Square
480	Fahrettin Altay Meydan 2, Fahrettin Altay Meydan 5, Fahrettin Altay Meydan 9	İnciraltı — Üçkuyular İskele	Fahrettin Altay Square
486	Fahrettin Altay Meydan 5	Oyak Sitesi — İnciraltı	Fahrettin Altay Square
510	Fahrettin Altay Meydan 2, Fahrettin Altay Meydan 5, Fahrettin Altay Meydan 9	Gaziemir — Balçova	Fahrettin Altay Square
517	Fahrettin Altay Meydan 6, Fahrettin Altay Meydan 7	Uzundere Toplu Konutları — F. Altay	Fahrettin Altay Square
551	Fahrettin Altay Meydan 2, Fahrettin Altay Meydan 8, Fahrettin Altay Meydan 9	Narlıdere — F. Altay	Fahrettin Altay Square
650	Fahrettin Altay Meydan 2, Fahrettin Altay Meydan 5, Fahrettin Altay Meydan 9	Fuar İzmir — Balçova	Fahrettin Altay Square
671	Fahrettin Altay Meydan 3	Şirinyer Aktarma Merkezi — F. Altay Aktarma Merkezi	Fahrettin Altay Square
675 (express bus)	Fahrettin Altay Meydan 9	Seferihisar — F. Altay Aktarma Merkezi	Fahrettin Altay Square
681	Fahrettin Altay Meydan 6, Fahrettin Altay Meydan 7	F. Altay — Lozan Meydanı	Fahrettin Altay Square
684 (express bus)	Fahrettin Altay Meydan 9	Urla — F. Altay Aktarma Merkezi	Fahrettin Altay Square
690 (limited service express)	Fahrettin Altay Meydan 3	Tınaztepe — F. Altay	Fahrettin Altay Square
811	Fahrettin Altay Meydan 2, Fahrettin Altay Meydan 6	Engelliler Merkezi — Montrö	Fahrettin Altay Square
873	Fahrettin Altay Meydan 3	Yenitepe Evleri — Fahrettin Altay Aktarma	Fahrettin Altay Square
879	Fahrettin Altay Meydan 6, Fahrettin Altay Meydan 7	F. Altay — Gaziemir Semt Garajı	Fahrettin Altay Square
883 (express bus)	Fahrettin Altay Meydan 9	İYTE — F. Altay Aktarma Merkezi	Fahrettin Altay Square
909	Fahrettin Altay Meydan 9	Zeytinalanı — F. Altay Aktarma Merkezi	Fahrettin Altay Square
945	Fahrettin Altay Meydan 2, Fahrettin Altay Meydan 8, Fahrettin Altay Meydan 9	Esentepe — Üçkuyular İskele	Fahrettin Altay Square
946	Fahrettin Altay Meydan 8, Fahrettin Altay Meydan 9	General Kazım Özalp Mah. — Üçkuyular İskele	Fahrettin Altay Square
950 (night bus)	Fahrettin Altay Meydan 2, Fahrettin Altay Meydan 6, Fahrettin Altay Meydan 7	Narlıdere — Konak	Fahrettin Altay Square
969	Fahrettin Altay Meydan 3	Balçova — F. Altay Aktarma Merkezi	Fahrettin Altay Square
971	Fahrettin Altay Meydan 9	Narbel — F. Altay Aktarma Merkezi	Fahrettin Altay Square
975	Fahrettin Altay Meydan 9	Seferihisar — F. Altay Aktarma	Fahrettin Altay Square
977	Fahrettin Altay Meydan 2, Fahrettin Altay Meydan 5, Fahrettin Altay Meydan 9	İzmir Demokrasi Üniversitesi — Üçkuyular İskele	Fahrettin Altay Square
981	Fahrettin Altay Meydan 9	Balıklıova — F. Altay Aktarma Merkezi	Fahrettin Altay Square
982	Fahrettin Altay Meydan 9	İYTE — F. Altay Aktarma Merkezi	Fahrettin Altay Square
983	Fahrettin Altay Meydan 9	Bademler — F. Altay Aktarma Merkezi	Fahrettin Altay Square
984	Fahrettin Altay Meydan 9	Urla — F. Altay Aktarma Merkezi	Fahrettin Altay Square
985	Fahrettin Altay Meydan 9	Seferihisar — F. Altay Aktarma Merkezi	Fahrettin Altay Square
987	Fahrettin Altay Meydan 9	Ürkmez — F. Altay Aktarma Merkezi	Fahrettin Altay Square
