= T2 (Tram İzmir) =

Urban light rail transit (LRT) system in İzmir, Turkey

Konak Tram
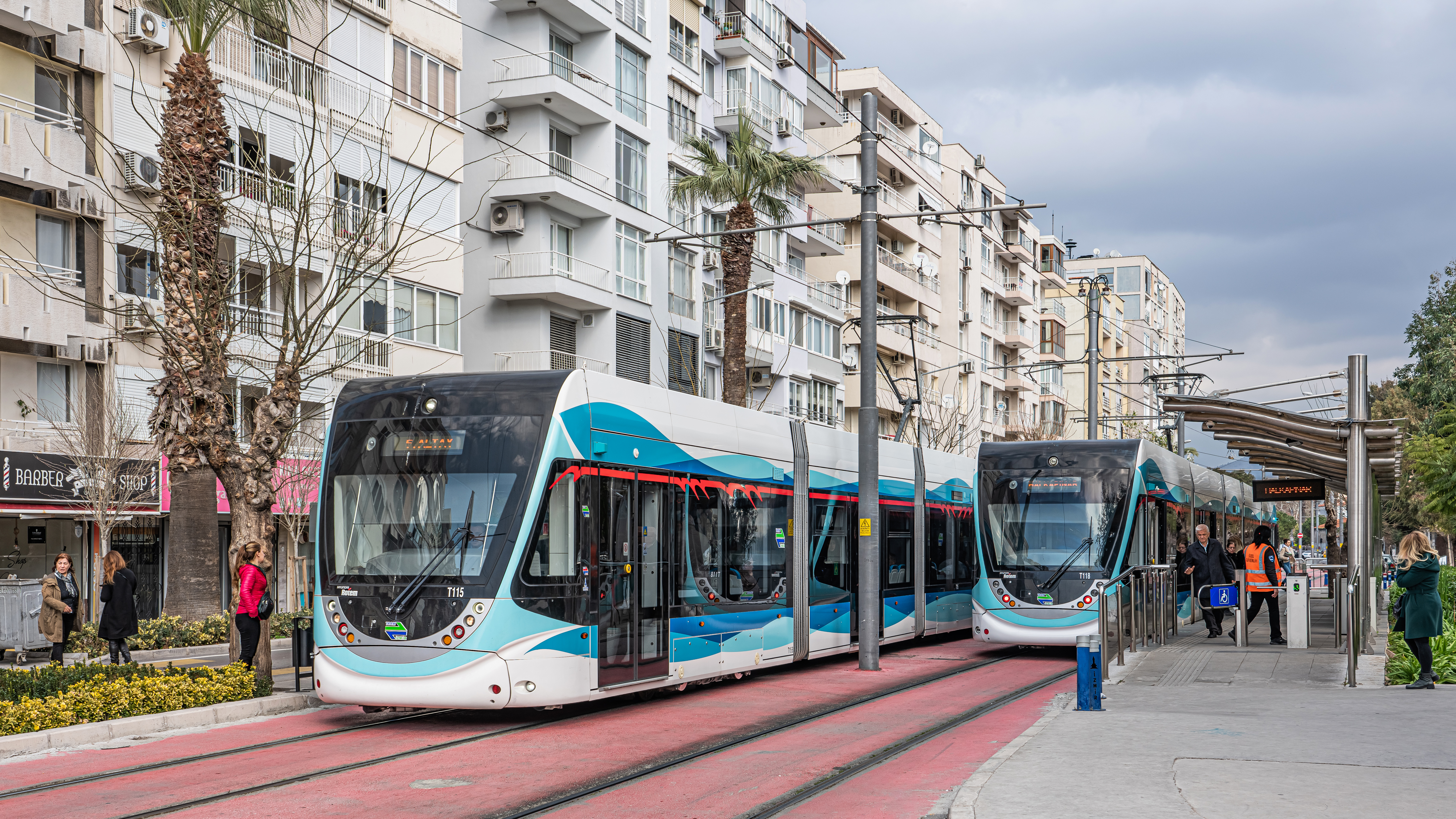
- Two trams at Atatürk Sport Hall, next to Kültürpark

Overview
- Status: Operating
- Owner: İzmir Metropolitan Municipality
- Locale: İzmir, Turkey
- Termini: Halkapınar, Konak; Fahrettin Altay, Konak
- Stations: 19

Service
- Type: Light-rail
- System: Tram İzmir
- Services: 1
- Route number: T2
- Operator(s): İzmir Metro A.Ş.
- Depot(s): Halkapınar
- Rolling stock: 21

History
- Opened: 24 March 2018; 7 years ago

Technical
- Line length: 12.8 km (8.0 mi)
- Number of tracks: 2
- Track gauge: 1,435 mm (4 ft 8 1/2 in) standard gauge
- Electrification: 750 V DC Overhead line (Overvolted to 875 volts)
- Operating speed: 50 km/h (31 mph)

T2 Konak Tram (Turkish: Konak Tramvayı) is a 12.8 km (8.0 mi) urban light rail transit (LRT) system in Konak district of İzmir, Turkey and is one of the three lines of Tram İzmir. The line serves 19 stations and began operating on 24 April 2018.

The tram line runs between Fahrettin Altay Square, Konak and Halkapınar. It is part of the Karşıyaka and Konak Tram project of İzmir Metropolitan Municipality, which cost nearly ₺ 450 million (approx. US$120 million).

The Konak tram is operated by the İzmir Metro. It has 21 tramcars, produced by Hyundai Rotem plant in Adapazarı. The double-ended 32 m (105 ft)-long five-module tramcars are each 43.1 t heavy. They have 48 seating capacity, and can carry up to 285 passengers each. Service speed is 24 km/h (15 mph), and top speed is 70 km/h (43 mph). The tramcars run on standard track gauge at 1,435 mm (4 ft 8 1/2 in). The electrification system of the tramcars is 750 V DC. The line has a communications-based train control (CBTC) signalling system.

== See also ==
- Trams İzmir
- T1 Karşıyaka Tram
- T3 Çiğli Tram
