= Bostanlı İskele (Tram İzmir) =

LRT station in İzmir, Turkey

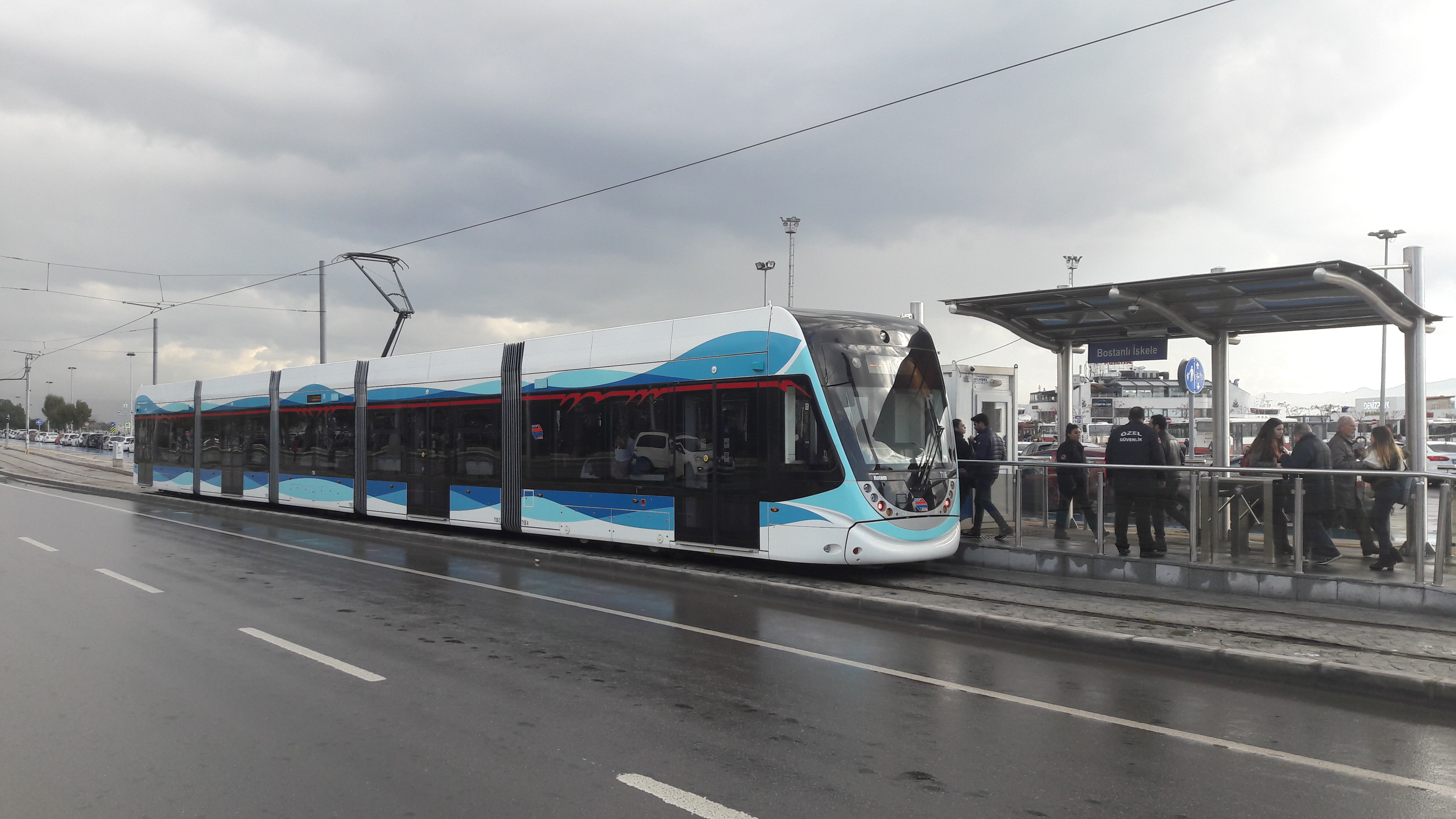
- An eastbound tram at the station.

General information
- Location: Hasan Ali Yücel Blv., Bostanlı Mah., 35590; Karşıyaka
- Coordinates: 38.4547°N 27.0976°E
- System: Tram İzmir light-rail station
- Owner: İzmir Metropolitan Municipality
- Operator: İzmir Metro A.Ş.
- Line: T1 Green Line
- Platforms: 2 side platforms
- Tracks: 2
- Connections: İzdeniz at Bostanlı Terminal; ESHOT Bus: 121, 200, 212, 213, 221, 229, 290, 322, 327, 330, 423, 428, 429, 430, 435, 442, 443, 445, 446, 447, 532, 543, 547, 595, 777, 820, 821, 827

Construction
- Accessible: Yes

History
- Opened: 11 April 2017

Services
Preceding station	Tram İzmir	Following station
Çarşı towards Flamingo	T1 Green Line	Yunuslar towards Alaybey
Location

Bostanlı İskele is a light-rail station on the Karşıyaka Tram line of the Tram İzmir system. The station is located on Hasan Ali Yücel Boulevard, adjacent to the Bostanlı ferry terminal. The station consists of two side platforms, one on each side of the boulevard.

Bostanlı İskele station is the only station on the Karıyaka line to be split across a street. The westbound (Ataşehir) track is located on the north side of Hasan Ali Yücel Boulevard, in front of the Suat Taser Open-air Theater, while the eastbound (Alaybey) track is located on the south side, in front of the Bostanlı ferry terminal. Both platforms are wheelchair-accessible and are integrated with the city-wide smartcard, İzmirimkart.

There is a transfer from the station to the İZDENİZ ferries and ESHOT buses.

Bostanlı İskele station was opened on 11 April 2017.
