= İzmirim Kart =

Smart card for public transport in İzmir, Turkey

- Location: İzmir Province
- Launched: June 1, 2015
- Technology: MiFare Plus with proprietary error correction scheme (pay-as-you-go and free passes); NXP MyD (disposable variant)
- Operator: İzmir Teknoloji A.Ş.
- Manager: İzmir Municipality
- Currency: TL (pay-as-you-go), credit units (disposable) (1250 TL maximum load)
- Stored-value: Disposable variant only
- Credit expiry: 35 days for disposable variant only
- Auto recharge: Optional for pay-as-you-go variant
- Unlimited use: Depends on the variant
- Validity: İzmir Metro; İZBAN (commuter railway); ESHOT (buses); İzdeniz (ferries); İzmir Tram; Balçova Gondola; Bornova Ice Sports Hall; İzmir Wildlife Park; İzmir International Fair; Public toilets at transfer stations
- Retailed: Online; Newsstands; Stations
- Variants: Pay as you go; Disposable e-ticket (bilet 35); Electronic senior pass for access-control of nationally-mandated free transport of seniors
- Website: www.izmirimkart.com.tr

The İzmirim Kart is a proximity type smart card used for payment in public transport of İzmir, Turkey. It gradually replaced İzmir Kentkart after Kentkart could not get the tender. Disposable variant is called bilet 35 and it is possible to buy 3, 5, 10 credit forms.

== Refills ==
The pay-as-you-go variant of the card operates as if it were stored-value, though it is technically a deposit card. Refills are done by electronic funds transfer via VakıfBank using deposit accounts associated to supported POS terminals.

== Security ==
The card stores data about last few transactions to prevent fraud. Transactions otherwise commence online. If data on the card about a particular transaction mismatches data on the central database, the card may be blocked.
