= Yunuslar (Tram İzmir) =

LRT station in İzmir, Turkey

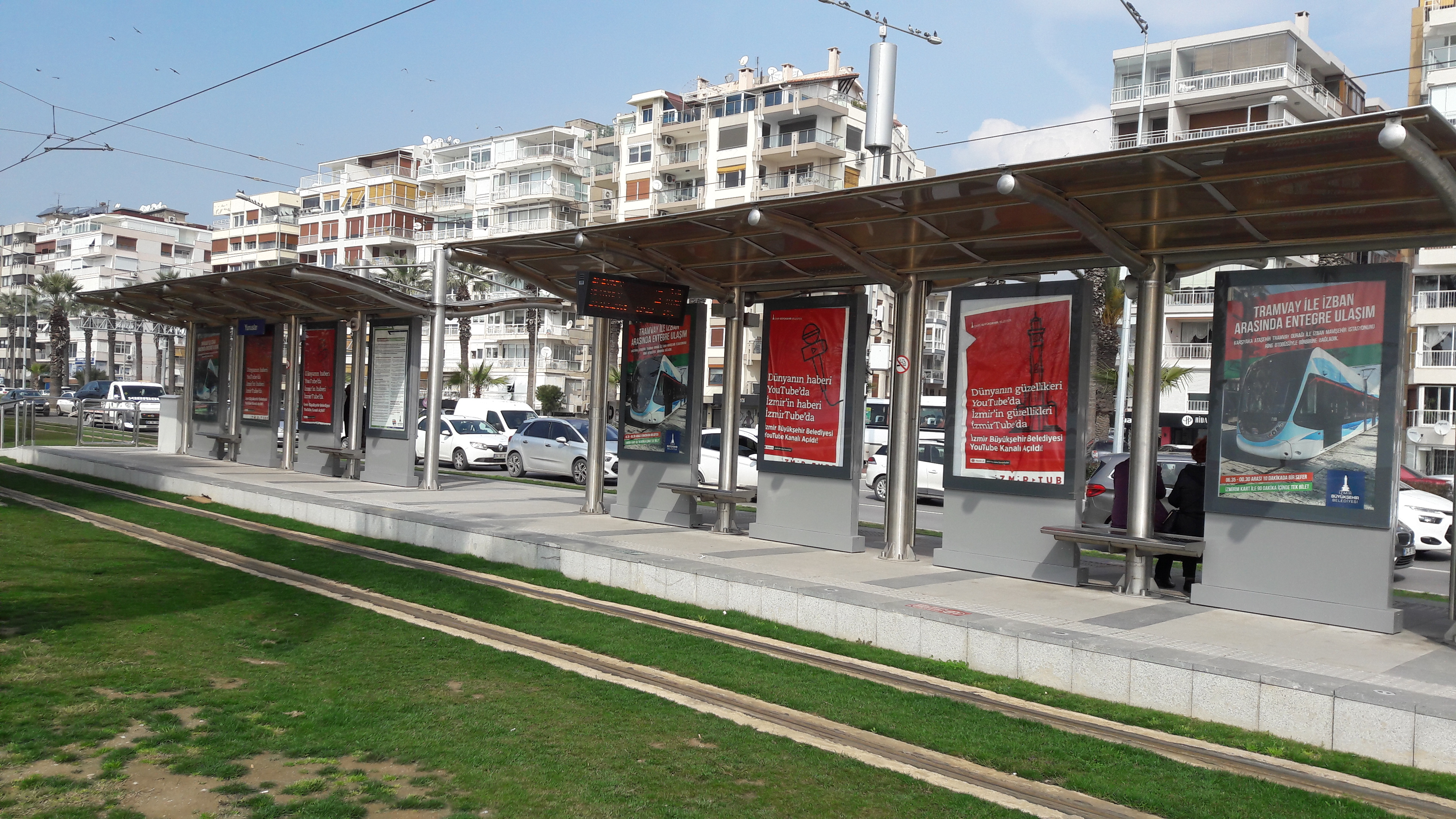

General information
- Location: Park İçi Yolu, Aksoy Mah., 35580; Karşıyaka
- Coordinates: 38.4516°N 27.1034°E
- System: Tram İzmir light-rail station
- Owner: İzmir Metropolitan Municipality
- Operator: İzmir Metro A.Ş.
- Line: T1 Green Line
- Platforms: 1 island platform
- Tracks: 2
- Connections: ESHOT Bus: 126, 135, 136, 137, 197, 222, 258, 326, 361, 430, 435, 487, 532, 741, 742, 847, 853, 920

Construction
- Accessible: Yes

History
- Opened: 11 April 2017

Services
Preceding station	Tram İzmir	Following station
Bostanlı İskele towards Flamingo	T1 Green Line	Nikah Sarayı towards Alaybey
Location

Yunuslar is a light-rail station on the Karşıyaka Tram line of the Tram İzmir network. The station consists of an island platform serving two tracks. Yunuslar is located within the Karşıyaka Waterfront Park (Turkish: Karşıyaka Sahil Parkı), on the south side of Cemal Gürsel Boulevard, near the Yunuslar Monument from which the station gets its name. Yunuslar station was opened on 11 April 2017, along with the entire tram line.

== Connections ==
ESHOT operates city bus service on Girne Boulevard.

ESHOT Bus service
Route number	Stop	Route	Location
126	Şehit Diplomat Erdoğan Özen	Cumhuriyet Mahallesi — Karşıyaka	Girne Boulevard
135	Şehit Diplomat Erdoğan Özen	Doğançay — Karşıyaka	Girne Boulevard
136	Şehit Diplomat Erdoğan Özen	Örnekköy — Karşıyaka	Girne Boulevard
137	Şehit Diplomat Erdoğan Özen	Yamanlar — Karşıyaka	Girne Boulevard
197	Şehit Diplomat Erdoğan Özen	Nafız Gürman — Karşıyaka	Girne Boulevard
222	Şehit Diplomat Erdoğan Özen	Şemikler — Karşıyaka İskele	Girne Boulevard
258	Şehit Diplomat Erdoğan Özen	Onur Mahallesi — Karşıyaka	Girne Boulevard
326	Şehit Diplomat Erdoğan Özen	Mustafa Kemal Mahallesi — Karşıyaka	Girne Boulevard
361	Şehit Diplomat Erdoğan Özen	Bahriye Üçok — Karşıyaka İskele	Girne Boulevard
430	Şehit Diplomat Erdoğan Özen	Yaka Kent Mahallesi — Bostanlı İskele	Girne Boulevard
435	Şehit Diplomat Erdoğan Özen	Körfez Mahallesi — Bostanlı İskele	Girne Boulevard
487	Şehit Diplomat Erdoğan Özen	Demirköprü — Karşıyaka	Girne Boulevard
532	Şehit Diplomat Erdoğan Özen	Bayraklı Şehir Hastanesi — Bostanlı İskele	Girne Boulevard
741	Şehit Diplomat Erdoğan Özen	Yamanlar Köyü — Karşıyaka	Girne Boulevard
742	Şehit Diplomat Erdoğan Özen	Sancaklı Köyü — Karşıyaka	Girne Boulevard
847	Şehit Diplomat Erdoğan Özen	Bayraklı Evleri — Karşıyaka	Girne Boulevard
853	Şehit Diplomat Erdoğan Özen	Egekent Aktarma — Karşıyaka İskele	Girne Boulevard
920	Şehit Diplomat Erdoğan Özen	Çiğli — Konak	Girne Boulevard
