= Çarşı (Tram İzmir) =

LRT station in İzmir, Turkey

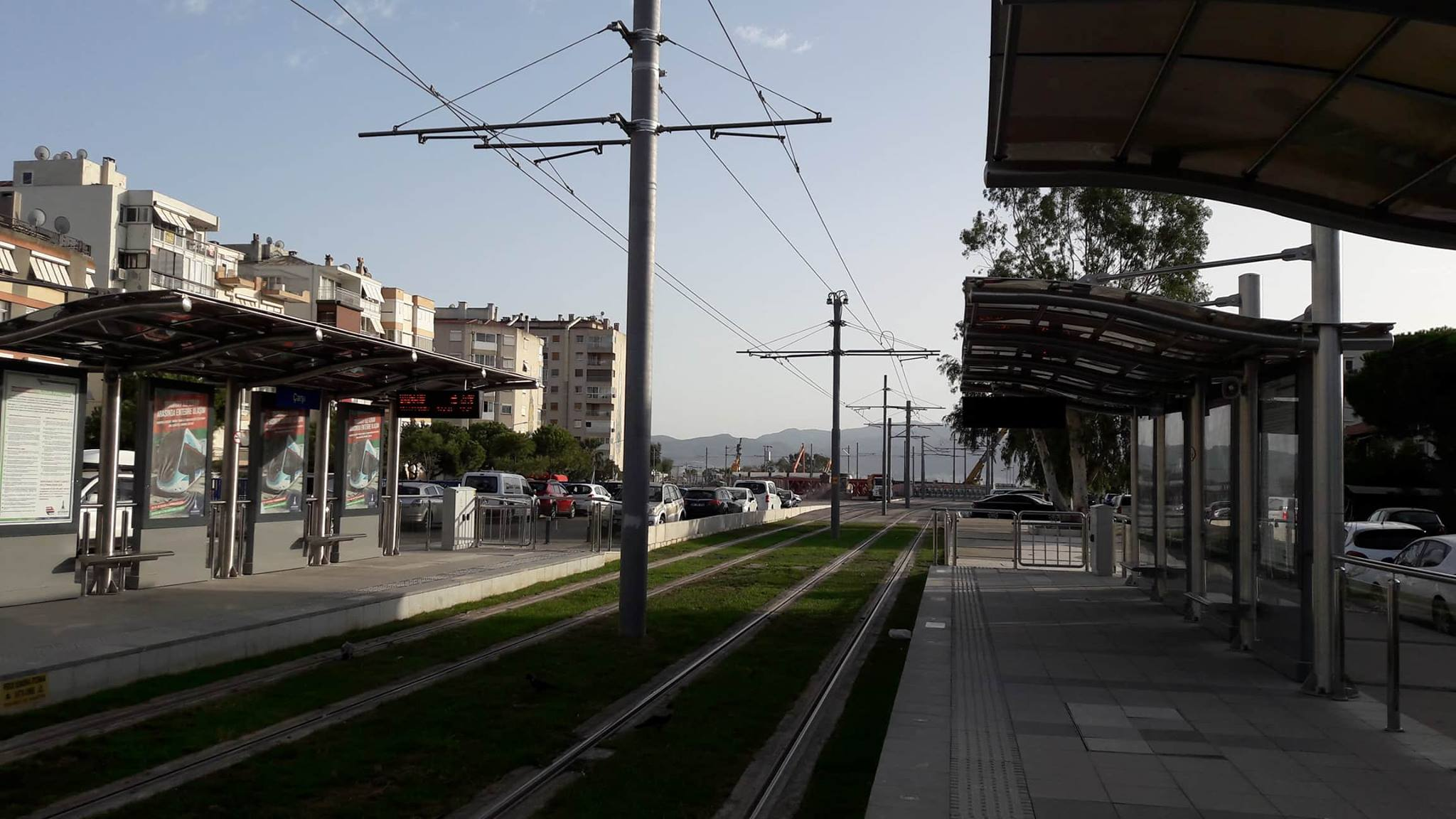

General information
- Location: 2018 Sk., Bostanlı Mah., 35590; Karşıyaka
- Coordinates: 38.4582°N 27.0944°E
- System: Tram İzmir light-rail station
- Owner: İzmir Metropolitan Municipality
- Operator: İzmir Metro A.Ş.
- Line: T1 Green Line
- Platforms: 2 side platforms
- Tracks: 2

Construction
- Accessible: Yes

History
- Opened: 11 April 2017

Services
| Preceding station | Tram İzmir | Following station |
|---|---|---|
| Vilayet Evi towards Flamingo | T1 Green Line | Bostanlı İskele towards Alaybey |
Location

Çarşı is a light-rail station on the Karşıyaka Tram line of the Tram İzmir system in İzmir, Turkey. The station is located between 2018th Street and the Bostanlı Creek and consists of two side platforms served by two tracks. Both platforms are wheelchair-accessible and are integrated with the citywide smartcard, İzmirimkart.

Şht. Cengiz Topal Avenue is located just northwest of the station, which is an automobile-free road for pedestrians and tram traffic only. Many cafes and shops are located along the avenue.

There is no transfer from the station.

Çarşı station was opened on 11 April 2017.
