= Mustafa Kemal Atatürk Spor Salonu (Tram İzmir) =

LRT station in İzmir, Turkey

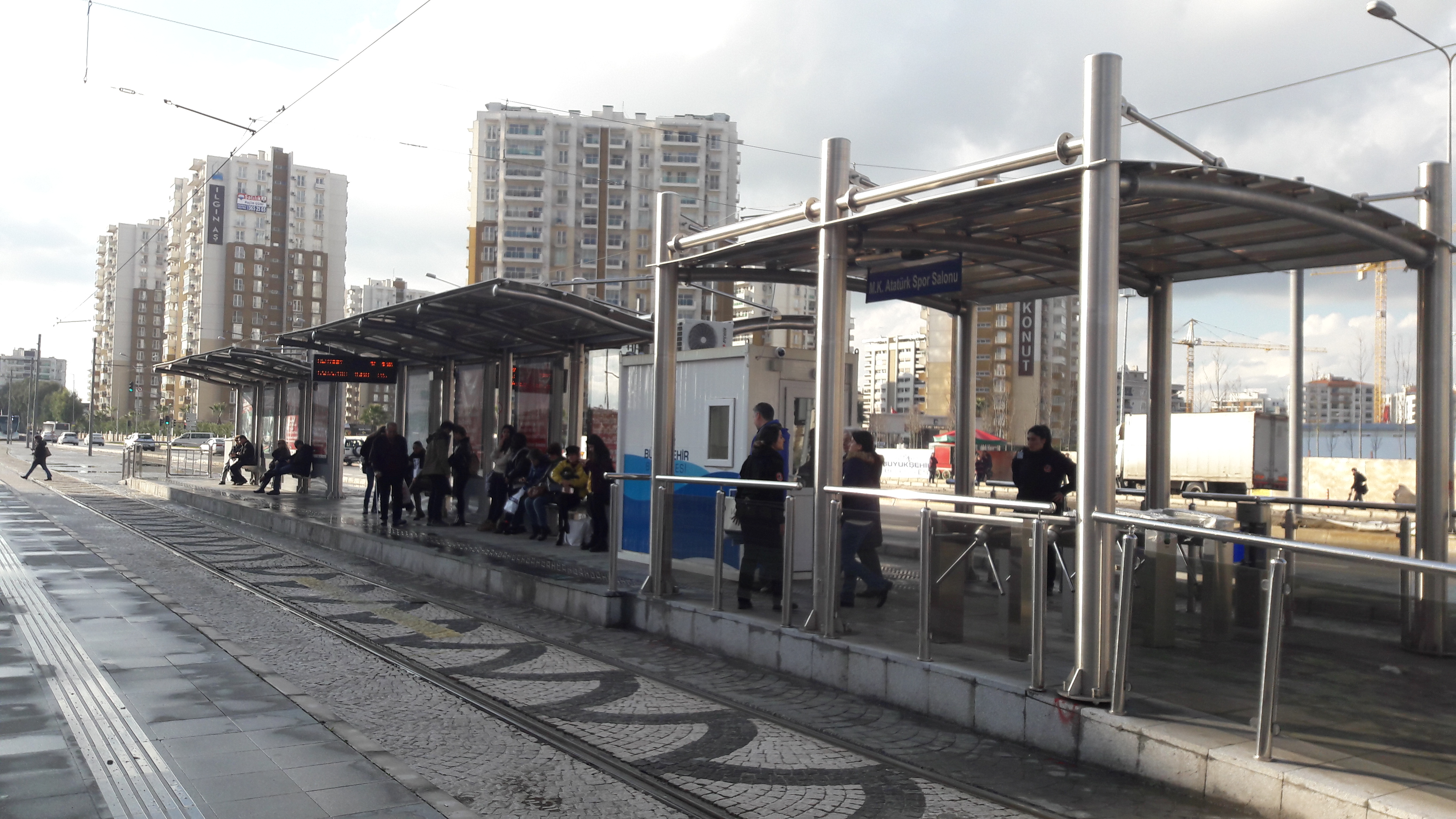

General information
- Location: Caher Dudayev Blv., Mavişehir Mah., 35590; Karşıyaka
- Coordinates: 38.4752°N 27.0748°E
- System: Tram İzmir light-rail station
- Owner: İzmir Metropolitan Municipality
- Operator: İzmir Metro A.Ş.
- Line: T1 Green Line
- Platforms: 1 island platform
- Tracks: 2
- Connections: ESHOT Bus: 121, 229, 322, 423, 428, 429, 442, 443, 445, 446, 447, 547, 595, 777, 820, 821, 827

Construction
- Accessible: Yes

History
- Opened: 11 April 2017

Services
Preceding station	Tram İzmir	Following station
Mavişehir towards Flamingo	T1 Green Line	Bilim Müzesi towards Alaybey
Location

Mustafa Kemal Atatürk Spor Salonu is a light-rail station on the Karşıyaka Tram line of the Tram İzmir network in Turkey. The station consists of an island platform serving two tracks. M.K. Atatürk Spor Salonu is located on Caher Dudayev Boulevard adjacent to the Karşıyaka Arena, Hilltown Shopping Center and Mavibahçe Shopping Center in Mavişehir, Karşıyaka. The station was opened on 11 April 2017, along with the entire tram line.

== Connections ==
ESHOT operates city bus service on Caher Dudayev Boulevard.

ESHOT Bus service
Route number	Stop	Route	Location
121	Mavişehir	Mavişehir Aktarma Merkezi — Konak	Caher Dudayev Boulevard
229	Mavişehir	Yakakent Mahallesi — Bostanlı İskele	Caher Dudayev Boulevard
322	Mavişehir	Mustafa Kemal Mahallesi — Bostanlı İskele	Caher Dudayev Boulevard
423	Mavişehir	Şirinevler — Bostanlı İskele	Caher Dudayev Boulevard
428	Mavişehir	Egekent 2 — Bostanlı İskele	Caher Dudayev Boulevard
429	Mavişehir	Güzeltepe — Bostanlı İskele	Caher Dudayev Boulevard
442	Mavişehir	Atatürk Mahllesi — Bostanlı İskele	Caher Dudayev Boulevard
443	Mavişehir	Egekent — Bostanlı İskele	Caher Dudayev Boulevard
445	Mavişehir	Evka 2 — Bostanlı İskele	Caher Dudayev Boulevard
446	Mavişehir	Evka 5 — Bostanlı İskele	Caher Dudayev Boulevard
447	Mavişehir	Evka 6 — Bostanlı İskele	Caher Dudayev Boulevard
547	Mavişehir	Çiğli Aktarma Merkezi — Bostanlı İskele	Caher Dudayev Boulevard
595	Mavişehir	9 Eylül Mahallesi — Bostanlı İskele	Caher Dudayev Boulevard
777	Mavişehir	Doğal Yaşam Parkı — Karşıyaka	Caher Dudayev Boulevard
820	Mavişehir	Harmandalı — Bostanlı İskele	Caher Dudayev Boulevard
821	Mavişehir	Mavişehir Aktarma Merkezi — Bostanlı İskele	Caher Dudayev Boulevard
827	Mavişehir	Ulukent Aktarma Merkezi — Bostanlı İskele	Caher Dudayev Boulevard
