= Atakent (Tram İzmir) =

LRT station in İzmir, Turkey

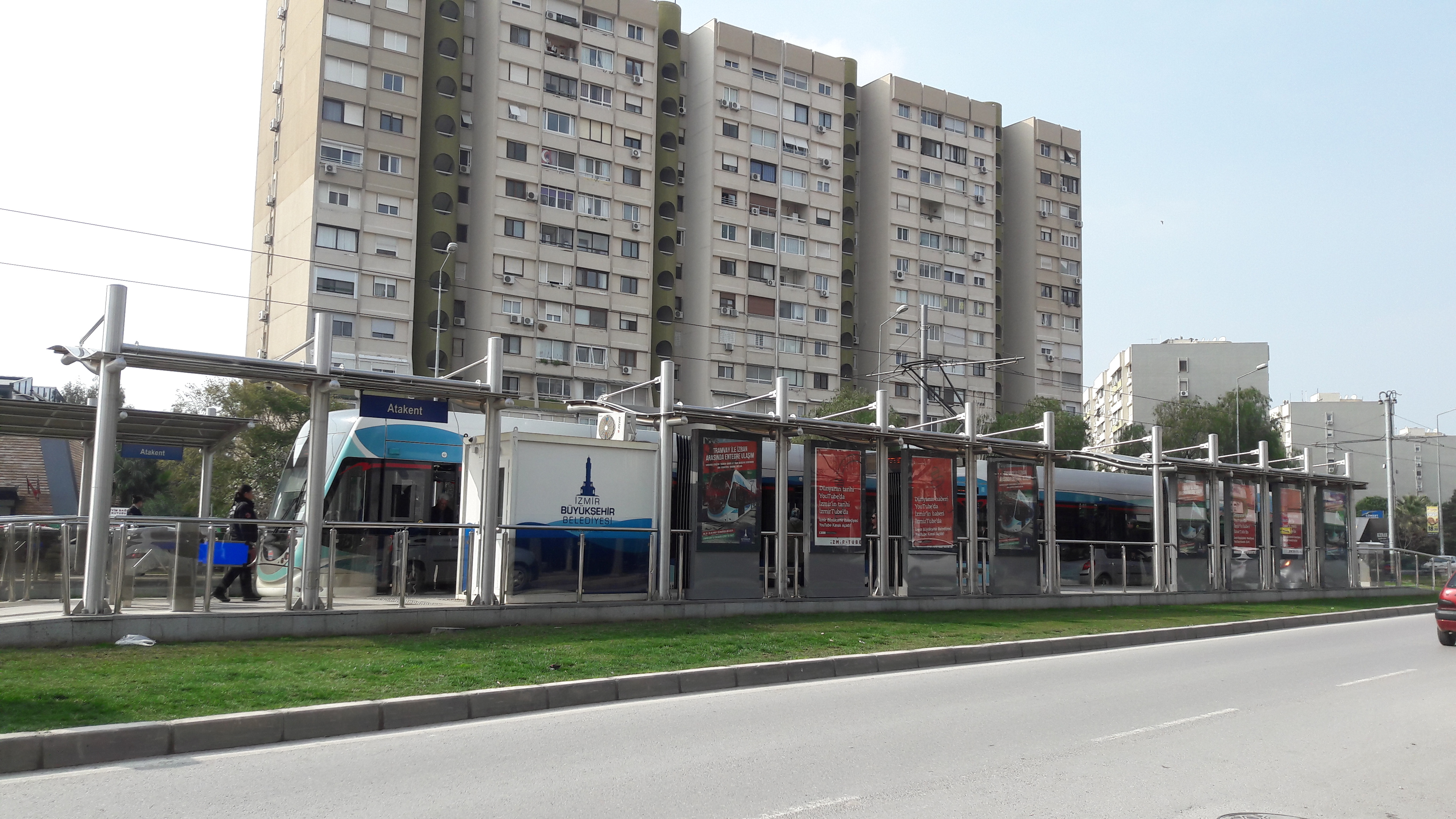

General information
- Location: Selçuk Yaşar Sk., Atakent Mah., 35590; Karşıyaka
- Coordinates: 38.4638°N 27.0860°E
- System: Tram İzmir light-rail station
- Owner: İzmir Metropolitan Municipality
- Operator: İzmir Metro A.Ş.
- Line: T1 Green Line
- Platforms: 2 island platforms
- Tracks: 2

Construction
- Accessible: Yes

History
- Opened: 11 April 2017

Services
Preceding station	Tram İzmir	Following station
Bilim Müzesi towards Flamingo	T1 Green Line	Selçuk Yaşar towards Alaybey
Location

Selçuk Yaşar is a light-rail station on the Karşıyaka Tram line of the Tram İzmir network. The station consists of an island platform serving two tracks. Selçuk Yaşar is located on Selçuk Yaşar Street in Atakent, Karşıyaka. The station was opened on 11 April 2017, along with the entire tram line.

There is no transfer from the station.
