= Vilayet Evi (Tram İzmir) =

LRT station in İzmir, Turkey

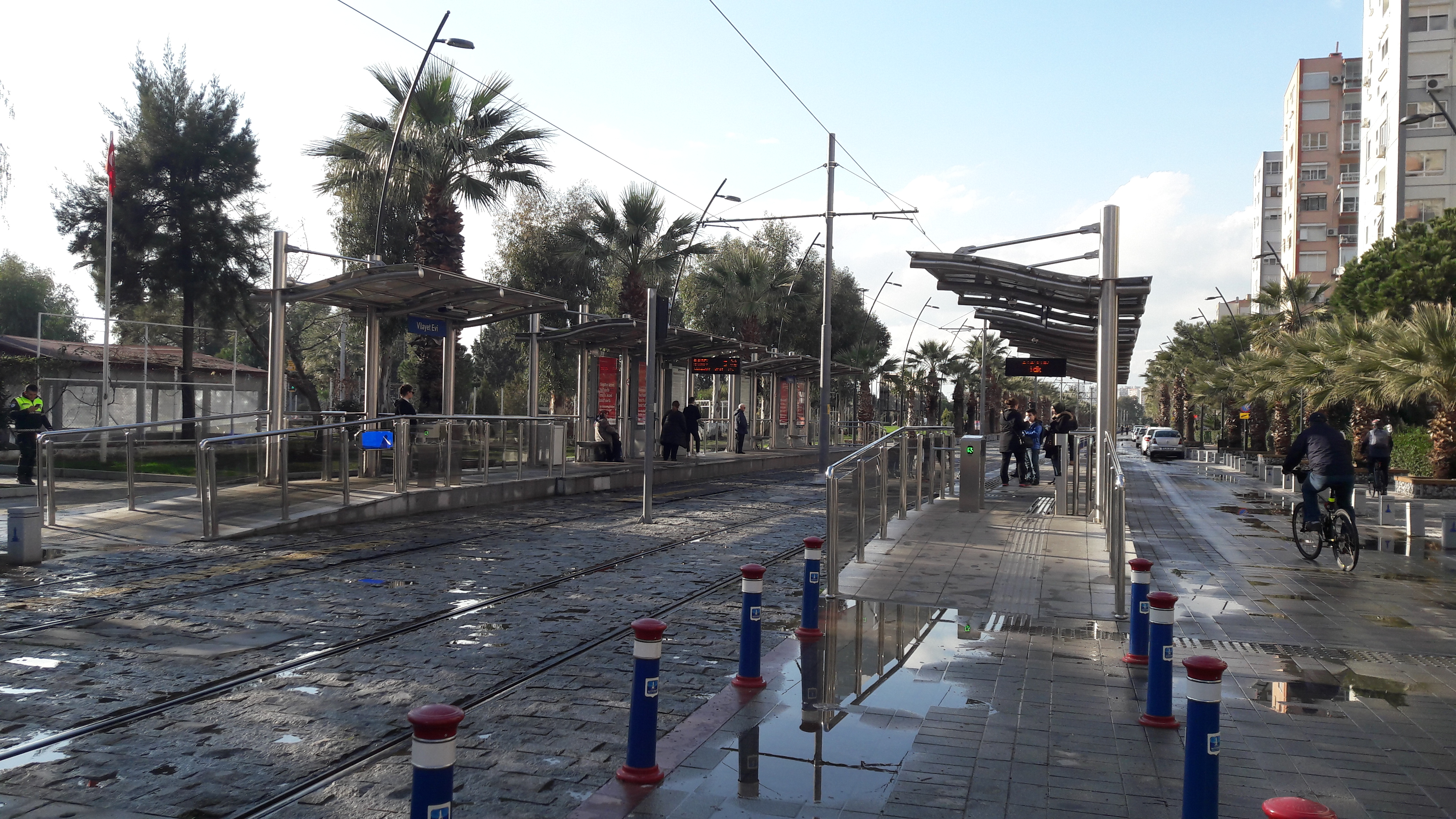
- Vilayet Evi station after rainfall.

General information
- Location: Şht. Cengiz Topel Cd., Atakent Mah., 35590; Karşıyaka
- Coordinates: 38.4605°N 27.0901°E
- System: Tram İzmir light-rail station
- Owner: İzmir Metropolitan Municipality
- Operator: İzmir Metro A.Ş.
- Line: T1 Green Line
- Platforms: 2 side platforms
- Tracks: 2

Construction
- Accessible: Yes

History
- Opened: 11 April 2017

Services
Preceding station	Tram İzmir	Following station
Selçuk Yaşar towards Flamingo	T1 Green Line	Çarşı towards Alaybey
Location

Vilayet Evi is a light-rail station on the Karşıyaka Tram line of the Tram İzmir network. The station consists of two side platforms serving two tracks. Vilayet Evi is located on Şehit Cengiz Topel Avenue in Atakent, Karşıyaka. The station was opened on 11 April 2017, along with the entire tram line.

There is no transfer from the station.
