= Bilim Müzesi (Tram İzmir) =

LRT station in İzmir, Turkey

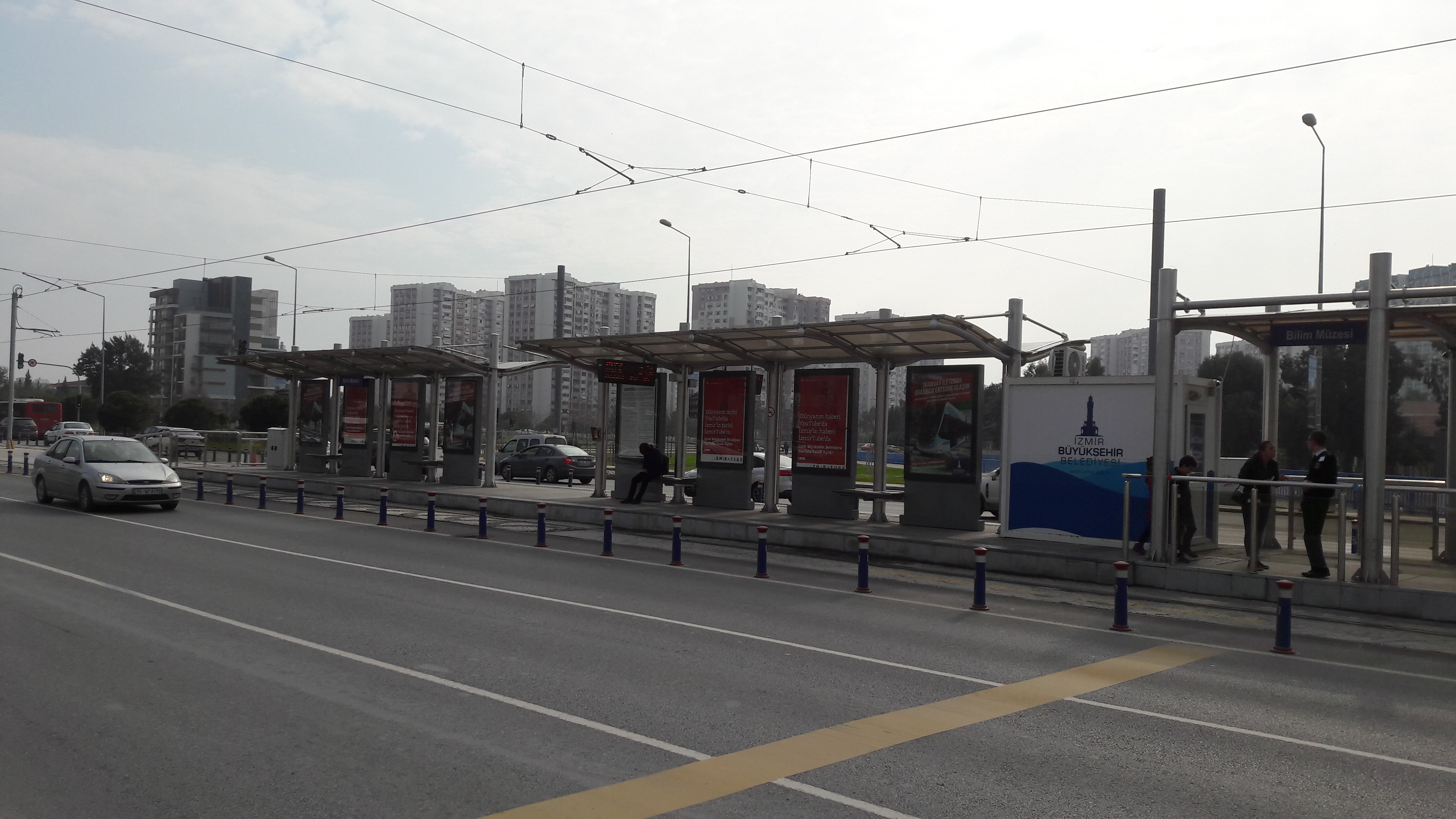

General information
- Location: Caher Dudayev Blv., Yalı Mah., 3550; Karşıyaka
- Coordinates: 38.4742°N 27.0823°E
- System: Tram İzmir light-rail station
- Owner: İzmir Metropolitan Municipality
- Operator: İzmir Metro A.Ş.
- Line: T1 Green Line
- Platforms: 1 island platform
- Tracks: 2

Construction
- Accessible: Yes

History
- Opened: 11 April 2017

Services
Preceding station	Tram İzmir	Following station
Mustafa Kemal Atatürk Spor Salonu towards Flamingo	T1 Green Line	Atakent towards Alaybey
Location

Bilim Müzesi is a light-rail station on the Karşıyaka Tram line of the Tram İzmir network. The station consists of an island platform serving two tracks. Bilim Müzesi is located on Caher Dudayev Boulevard in west Karşıyaka near the Karşıyaka Museum of Science, from which the station is named. The station was opened on 11 April 2017, along with the entire tram line.

There is no transfer from the station.
