= Nikah Sarayı (Tram İzmir) =

LRT station in İzmir, Turkey

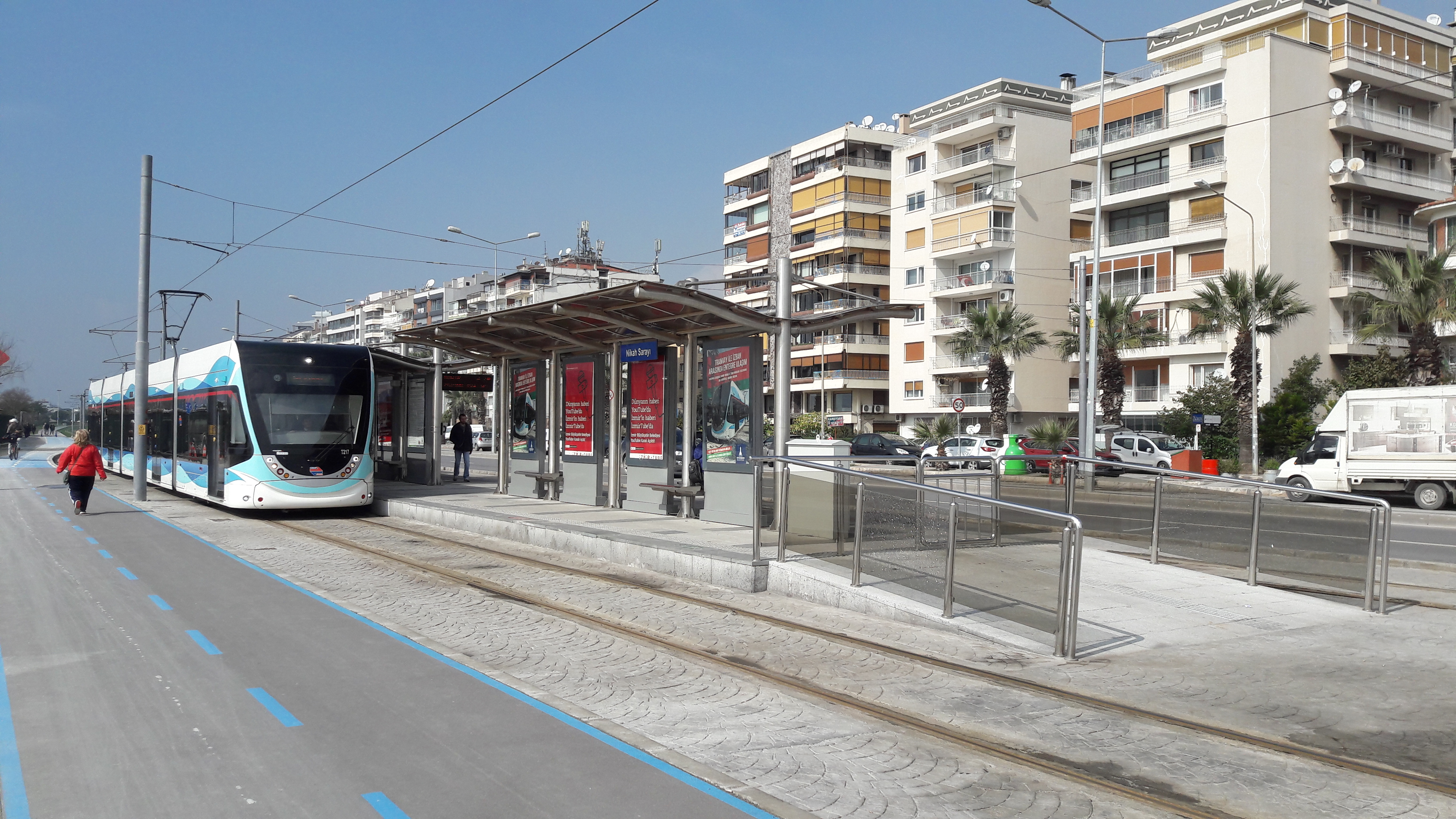
- A westbound tram approaching the station.

General information
- Location: Park İçi Yolu, Aksoy Mah., 35580; Karşıyaka
- Coordinates: 38.4497°N 27.1103°E
- System: Tram İzmir light-rail station
- Owner: İzmir Metropolitan Municipality
- Operator: İzmir Metro A.Ş.
- Line: T1 Green Line
- Platforms: 1 island platform
- Tracks: 2

Construction
- Accessible: Yes

History
- Opened: 11 April 2017

Services
Preceding station	Tram İzmir	Following station
Yunuslar towards Flamingo	T1 Green Line	Karşıyaka İskele towards Alaybey
Location

Nikah Sarayı is a light-rail station on the Karşıyaka Tram line of the Tram İzmir network. The station consists of an island platform serving two tracks. Nikah Sarayı is located within the Karşıyaka Waterfront Park (Turkish: Karşıyaka Sahil Parkı), on the south side of Cemal Gürsel Boulevard, near the Karşıyaka Matrimonial Office (Turkish: Nikah Sarayı) from which the station gets its name. Nikah Sarayı station was opened on 11 April 2017, along with the entire tram line.

There is no transfer from the station.
