= Karşıyaka İskele (Tram İzmir) =

LRT station in İzmir, Turkey

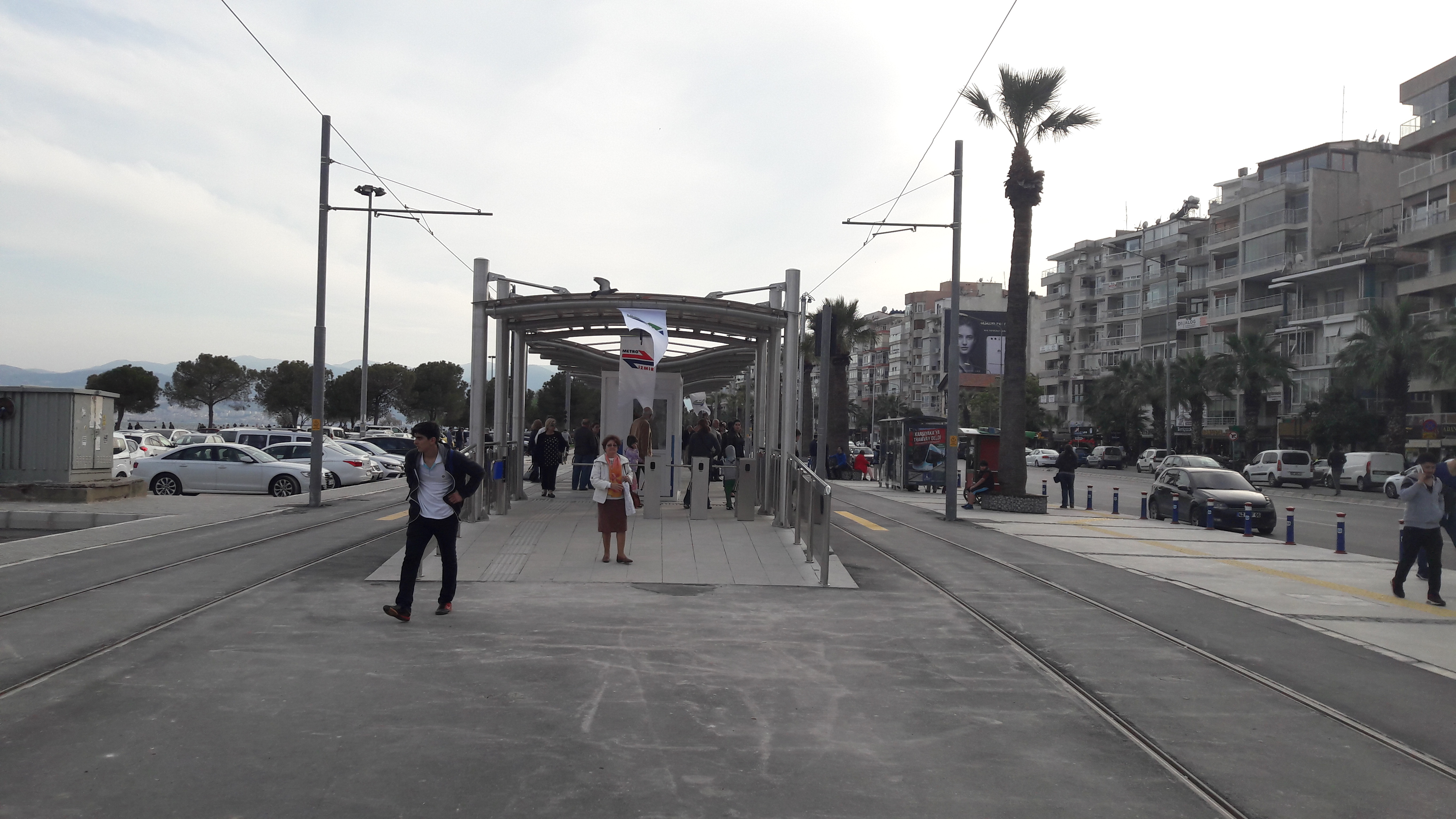
- Looking at the east side of the station.

General information
- Location: Hergele Meydanı, Donanmacı Mah., 35530; Karşıyaka
- Coordinates: 38.4550°N 27.1196°E
- System: Tram İzmir light-rail station
- Owner: İzmir Metropolitan Municipality
- Operator: İzmir Metro A.Ş.
- Line: T1 Green Line
- Platforms: 1 island platform
- Tracks: 2
- Connections: İzdeniz at Karşıyaka Terminal; ESHOT Bus: 121, 126, 135, 136, 137, 196, 197, 200, 222, 258, 290, 326, 330, 361, 487, 543, 741, 742, 777, 847, 853, 920

Construction
- Structure type: At-grade banked platform
- Parking: Yes
- Accessible: Yes

Other information
- Fare zone: A

History
- Opened: 11 April 2017

Services
Preceding station	Tram İzmir	Following station
Nikah Sarayı towards Flamingo	T1 Green Line	Alaybey Terminus
Location

Karşıyaka İskele is a light-rail station on the Karşıyaka Tram line of the Tram İzmir system in İzmir, Turkey. It is located on Hergele Square, alongside Cemal Gürsel Avenue, next to the Karşıyaka ferry terminal and across from the southeastern end of the Karşıyaka Çarşı. East of Karşıyaka İskele, the line becomes single-track until Alaybey. The station consists of a single entrance/exit on the eastern side toward the ferry terminal.

There is a transfer from the station to the İZDENİZ ferries and ESHOT buses.

Karşıyaka İskele station was opened on 11 April 2017.

== Connections ==
ESHOT Bus service
Route number	Stop	Route	Location
121	Karşıyaka İskele	Bostanlı İskelesi — Konak	Cemal Gürsel Avenue
126	Karşıyaka İskele	Cumhuriyet Mahallesi — Karşıyaka	Cemal Gürsel Avenue
135	Karşıyaka İskele	Doğançay — Karşıyaka	Cemal Gürsel Avenue
136	Karşıyaka İskele	Örnekköy — Karşıyaka	Cemal Gürsel Avenue
137	Karşıyaka İskele	Yamanlar — Karşıyaka	Cemal Gürsel Avenue
196	Karşıyaka İskele	Nafız Gürman — Karşıyaka	Cemal Gürsel Avenue
197	Karşıyaka İskele	Nafız Gürman — Karşıyaka	Cemal Gürsel Avenue
200	Karşıyaka İskele	Mavişehir Aktarma Merkezi — Havalimanı (Airport)	Cemal Gürsel Avenue
222	Karşıyaka İskele	Şemikler — Karşıyaka İskele	Cemal Gürsel Avenue
258	Karşıyaka İskele	Onur Mahallesi — Karşıyaka	Cemal Gürsel Avenue
290	Karşıyaka İskele	Bostanlı İskele — Tınaztepe	Cemal Gürsel Avenue
326	Karşıyaka İskele	Mustafa Kemal Mahallesi — Karşıyaka	Cemal Gürsel Avenue
330	Karşıyaka İskele	Bostanlı İskele — Evka 3 Metro	Cemal Gürsel Avenue
361	Karşıyaka İskele	Bahriye Üçok — Karşıyaka İskele	Cemal Gürsel Avenue
487	Karşıyaka İskele	Demirköprü — Karşıyaka	Cemal Gürsel Avenue
543	Karşıyaka İskele	Bostanlı İskele — H.Pınar Metro	Cemal Gürsel Avenue
741	Karşıyaka İskele	Yamanlar Köyü — Karşıyaka	Cemal Gürsel Avenue
742	Karşıyaka İskele	Sancaklı Köyü — Karşıyaka	Cemal Gürsel Avenue
777	Karşıyaka İskele	Doğal Yaşam Parkı — Karşıyaka	Cemal Gürsel Avenue
847	Karşıyaka İskele	Bayraklı Evleri — Karşıyaka	Cemal Gürsel Avenue
853	Karşıyaka İskele	Egekent Aktarma — Karşıyaka İskele	Cemal Gürsel Avenue
920	Karşıyaka İskele	Çiğli — Konak	Cemal Gürsel Avenue

Paired route denotes peak/off-peak hour variation.
