= T1 (Tram İzmir) =

Urban light rail transit (LRT) system in İzmir, Turkey

T1 Karşıyaka Tram
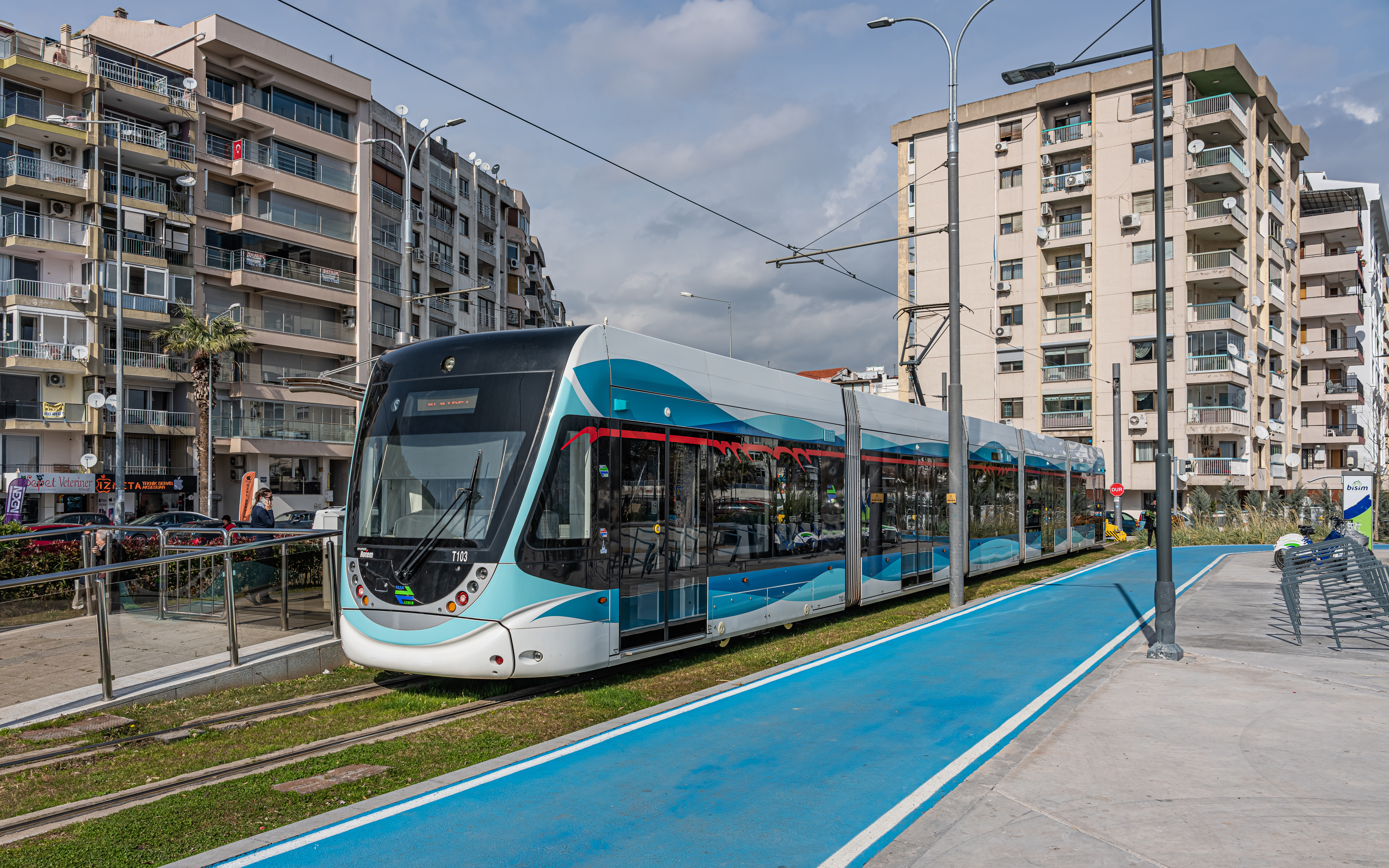
- A tram at Alaybey station

Overview
- Status: Operating
- Owner: İzmir Metropolitan Municipality
- Locale: İzmir, Turkey
- Termini: Alaybey (Karşıyaka) Mavişehir (Karşıyaka); Flamingo (Çiğli) Ataşehir (Çiğli)
- Stations: 15

Service
- Type: Light-rail
- System: Tram İzmir
- Services: 2
- Route number: T1
- Operator(s): İzmir Metro A.Ş.
- Depot(s): Mavişehir
- Rolling stock: 17

History
- Opened: April 11, 2017; 8 years ago January 27, 2024; 2 years ago

Technical
- Line length: 8.8 km (5.5 mi)
- Number of tracks: 2
- Character: Light rail with tram features
- Track gauge: 1,435 mm (4 ft 8 1/2 in) standard gauge
- Electrification: 750 V DC Overhead line (Overvolted to 875 volts)
- Operating speed: 60 km/h (37 mph)
- Highest elevation: 1 m (3.3 ft)

T1 Karşıyaka Tram (Turkish: T1 Karşıyaka Tramvayı) is a 8.8 km (5.5 mi) urban light rail transit (LRT) system in Karşıyaka and Çiğli districts of İzmir, Turkey and is one of the three lines of Tram İzmir.

Construction work on the tram line began in April 2015. Test drives began in January 2017 and the line entered service on 11 April 2017. The line, which will operate on the Alaybey – Ataşehir route until 27 January 2024, underwent changes in its route to integrate with the Çiğli Tram (T3), which entered service. The Alaybey – Flamingo line was named the Green Line, and the Mavişehir – Ataşehir line was named the Orange Line. The number of stations on the line increased to 15.

The operating system of the tram line has two different lines.

Green Line starts from Alaybey, Karşıyaka İskele, Nikah Sarayı, Yunuslar, Bostanlı İskele, Çarşı, Vilayet Evi, Selçuk Yaşar, Atakent, Bilim Müzesi, Mustafa Kemal Atatürk Spor Salonu, Mavişehir and reach Flamingo station.

Orange Line starts from Mavişehir, passes through the Çevre Yolu and ends in Ataşehir.

It is possible to transfer from T1 line to T3 Tram line, İZBAN's Alaybey station and buses operated by ESHOT.

The tram line is operated by İzmir Metro. The line is served by 17 tramcars produced by Hyundai Rotem plant in Adapazarı. The double-ended 32 m (105 ft)-long five-module tramcars are each 43.1 t heavy. They have 48 seating capacity, and can carry up to 285 passengers each. Service speed is 24 km/h (15 mph), and top speed is 70 km/h (43 mph). The tramcars run on standard track gauge at 1,435 mm (56.5 in). The electrification system of the tramcars is 750 V DC. The line has a communications-based train control (CBTC) signalling system.

The metropolitan mayor announced that the ride is free of charge for a duration of the first fifty days until the beginning of June 2017.

== See also ==
- Trams İzmir
- T2 Konak Tram
- T3 Çiğli Tram
