= Mavişehir (Tram İzmir) =

LRT station in İzmir, Turkey

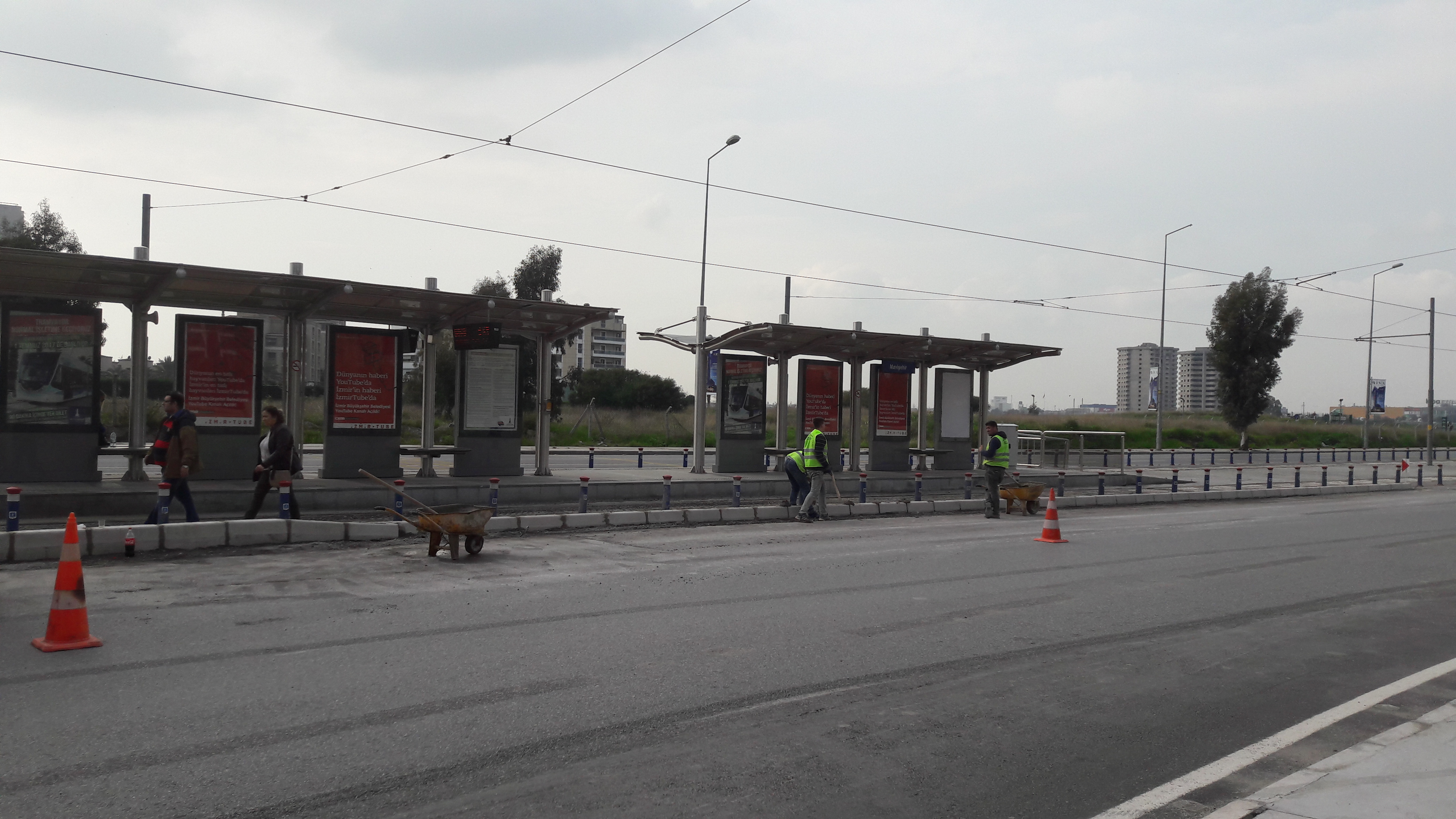

General information
- Location: Caher Dudayev Blv., Mavişehir Mah., 3590; Karşıyaka
- Coordinates: 38.4754°N 27.0678°E
- System: Tram İzmir light-rail station
- Owner: İzmir Metropolitan Municipality
- Operator: İzmir Metro A.Ş.
- Line: T1 Green Line T1 Orange Line
- Platforms: 1 island platform
- Tracks: 2

Construction
- Accessible: Yes

History
- Opened: 11 April 2017

Services
Preceding station	Tram İzmir	Following station
Flamingo Terminus	T1 Green Line	Mustafa Kemal Atatürk Spor Salonu towards Alaybey
Preceding station	Tram İzmir	Following station
Terminus	T1 Orange Line	Çevreyolu towards Ataşehir
Location

Mavişehir is a light-rail station on Karşıyaka Tram Green Line and Karşıyaka Tram Orange Line of the Tram İzmir network. The station consists of an island platform serving two tracks. Mavişehir station is served by both the Karşıyaka Tram Green Line and the Karşıyaka Tram Orange Line. and also the terminus station of the Karşıyaka Tram Orange Line. The station is located on Caher Dudayev Boulevard in western Mavişehir, Karşıyaka and was opened on 11 April 2017.
