= T3 (Tram İzmir) =

Urban light rail transit (LRT) system in İzmir, Turkey

T3 Çiğli Tram

Overview
- Status: Operating
- Owner: İzmir Metropolitan Municipality
- Locale: İzmir, Turkey
- Stations: 14

Service
- Type: Light-rail
- System: Tram İzmir
- Services: 2
- Route number: T3
- Operator: İzmir Metro A.Ş.
- Depot: Mavişehir

History
- Opened: January 27, 2024; 2 years ago

Technical
- Line length: 12 km (7.5 mi)
- Number of tracks: 2
- Character: Light rail with tram features
- Track gauge: 1,435 mm (4 ft 8 1/2 in) standard gauge
- Electrification: 750 V DC overhead line (overvolted to 875 volts)
- Operating speed: 60 km/h (37 mph)
- Highest elevation: 1 m (3.3 ft)

T3 Çiğli Tram (Turkish: T3 Çiğli Tramvayı) is a 12 km (7.5 mi) urban light rail transit (LRT) system in Çiğli district of İzmir, Turkey and is one of the three lines of Tram İzmir.

== History ==
Construction work on the tram line began in February 2021. Test drives began in December 2022 and the line entered service on 27 January 2024. The T3 Line is operated as two different ring lines, the Blue (Inner) Line following the "Flamingo - İAOSB - Flamingo" route and the Red (Outer) Line following the "Flamingo - Kâtip Çelebi Üniversitesi - İAOSB - Flamingo" route in the counterclockwise direction.

== Route ==
The Red (Outer) Line starts from Flamingo (formerly Ataşehir Kavşağı) and passes through Semra Aksu, Eski Havaalanı, Yenimahalle, Çiğli Bölge Hastanesi, Ata Sanayi and Evka 5 to reach Katip Çelebi Üniversitesi. The trams returning from Katip Çelebi Üniversitesi then pass through İAOSB Nedim Uysal Lisesi, Mustafa Kemal Atatürk Bulvarı, İAOSB Müdürlüğü, Kemal Baysak, Nihat Karakartal and Nazım Hikmet Ran and reach Ataşehir Kavşağı again to complete the ring service.

The Blue (Inner) Line starts from the Flamingo, passes through Nazım Hikmet Ran, Nihat Karakartal, Kemal Baysak, İAOSB Müdürlüğü, Mustafa Kemal Atatürk Bulvarı and reaches İAOSB Nedim Uysal Lisesi. Unlike the Outer (Red) Line, it continues its route from the switch area without stopping at Katip Çelebi Üniversitesi and passes through Evka 5, Ata Sanayi, Çiğli Bölge Hastanesi, Yenimahalle, Eski Havaalanı and Semra Aksu, and reaches the Ataşehir Kavşağı again, completing the ring service.

It is possible to transfer from T3 line to T1 Tram line, İZBAN's Çiğli station and buses operated by ESHOT.

The tram line is operated by İzmir Metro. The line is served by tramcars produced by Hyundai Rotem plant in Adapazarı. The double-ended 32 m (105 ft)-long five-module tramcars each weigh 43.1 t. They have 48 seating capacity, and can carry up to 285 passengers each. Service speed is 24 km/h (15 mph), and top speed is 70 km/h (43 mph). The tramcars run on standard track gauge at 1,435 mm (56.5 in). The electrification system of the tramcars is 750 V DC. The line has a communications-based train control (CBTC) signalling system.

== See also ==
- Tram İzmir
- T1 Karşıyaka Tram
- T2 Konak Tram
