= Ataşehir (Tram İzmir) =

LRT station in İzmir, Turkey

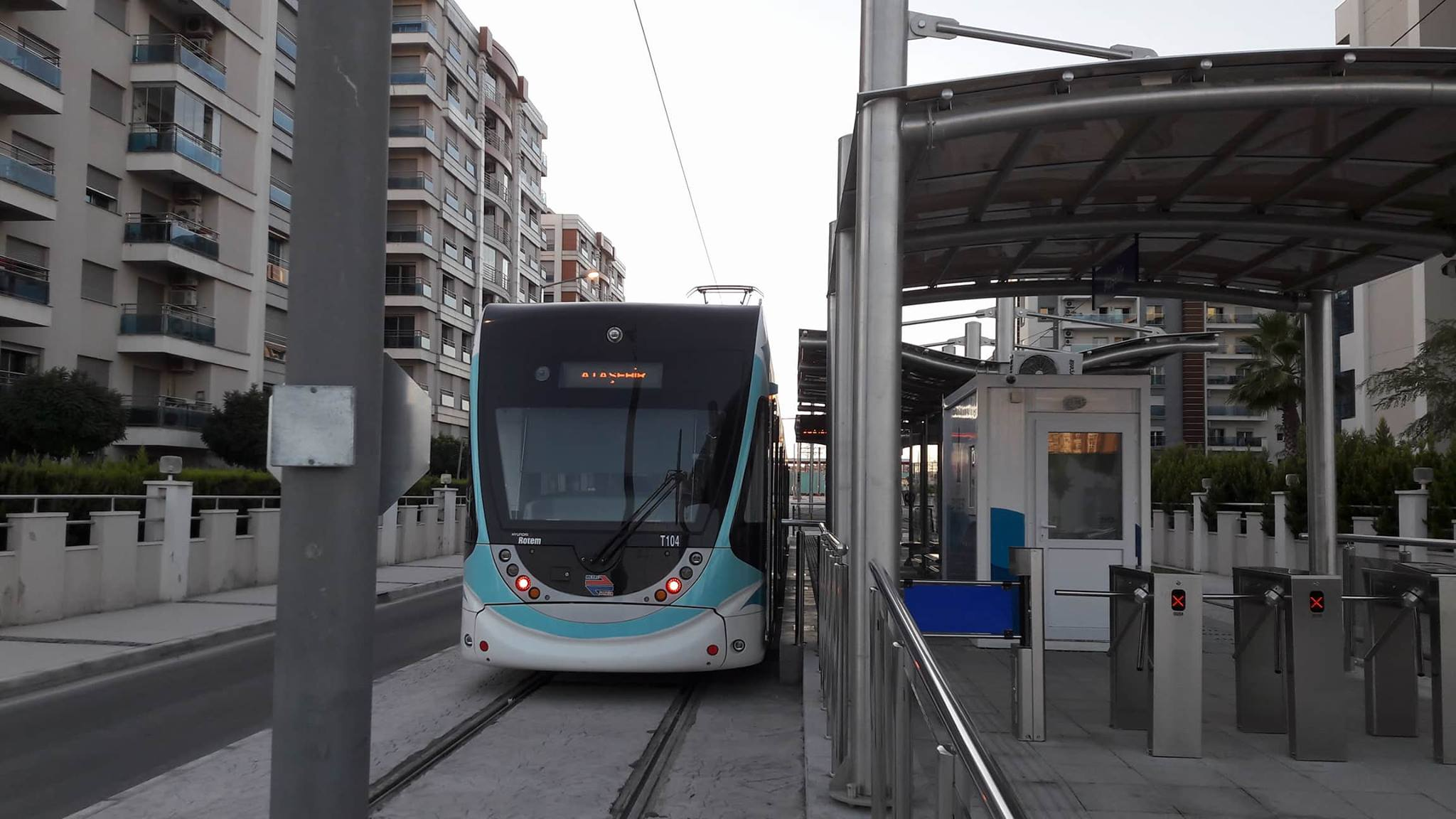
- A tram waiting to depart the station.

General information
- Location: 8291 Sk., Ataşehir Mah., 35630; Çiğli
- Coordinates: 38.4795°N 27.0731°E
- System: Tram İzmir light-rail station
- Owner: İzmir Metropolitan Municipality
- Operator: İzmir Metro A.Ş.
- Line: T1 Orange Line
- Platforms: 1 island platform
- Tracks: 2

Construction
- Accessible: Yes

History
- Opened: 1 July 2017

Services
| Preceding station | Tram İzmir | Following station |
|---|---|---|
| Çevreyolu towards Mavişehir | T1 Orange Line | Terminus |
Location

Ataşehir is the terminus of the Karşıyaka Tram Orange Line in İzmir, Turkey. It is located in the residential neighborhood of Ataşehir, Çiğli on 8291st Street. On official municipality maps, connection to İZBAN at Mavişehir station is shown, despite the station being 920 m (3,020 ft) northeast of the tram station.
