= Çevre Yolu (Tram İzmir) =

LRT station in İzmir, Turkey

Çevreyolu
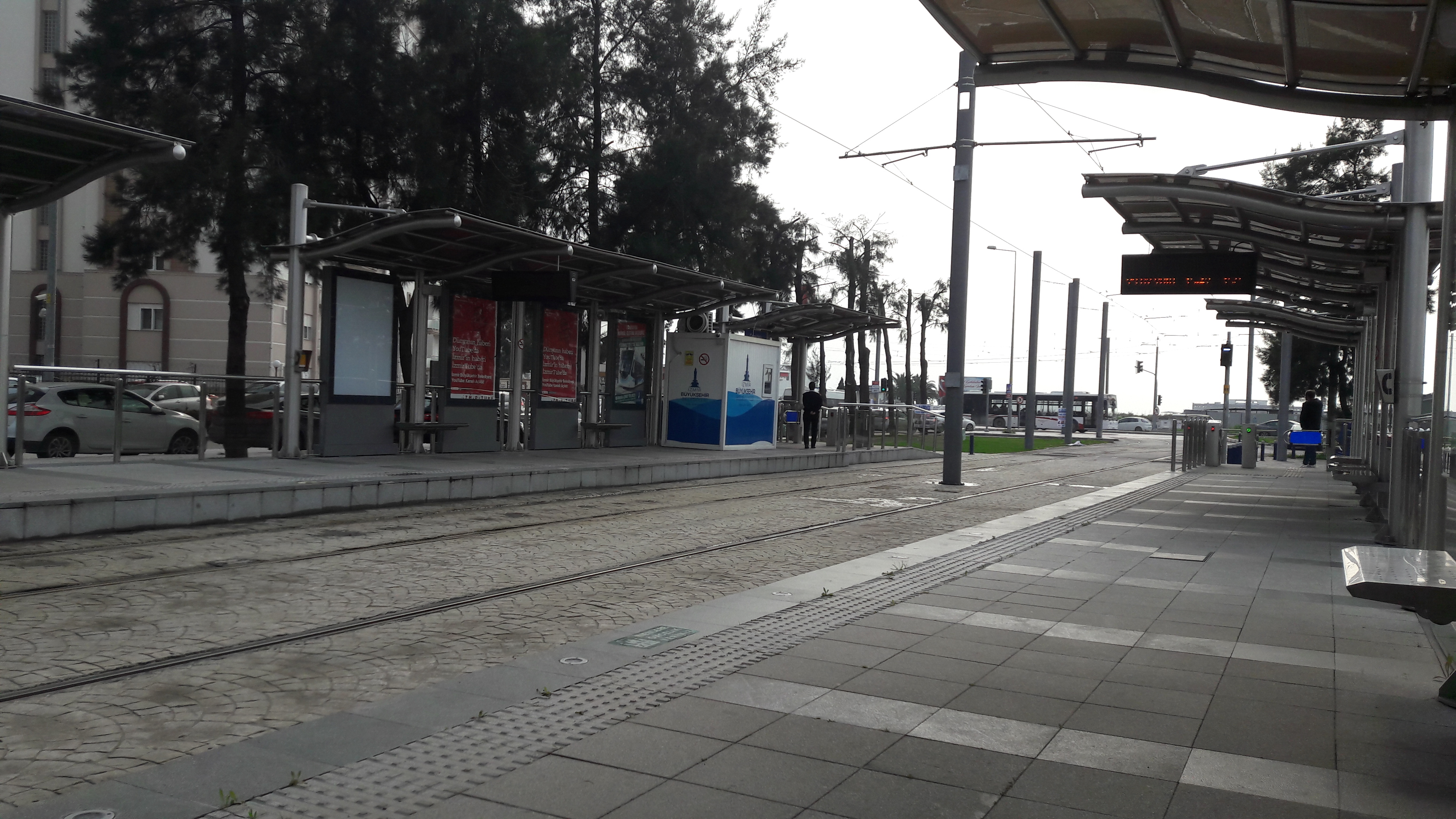

General information
- Location: 8291 Sk., Ataşehir Mah., 35630; Çiğli
- Coordinates: 38.4795°N 27.0658°E
- System: Tram İzmir light-rail station
- Owner: İzmir Metropolitan Municipality
- Operator: İzmir Metro A.Ş.
- Line: T1 Orange Line
- Platforms: 2 side platforms
- Tracks: 2

Construction
- Accessible: Yes

History
- Opened: 11 April 2017

Services
Preceding station	Tram İzmir	Following station
Mavişehir Terminus	T1 Orange Line	Ataşehir Terminus
Location

Çevreyolu is a light-rail station on the Karşıyaka Tram line of the Tram İzmir network. The station consists of two side platforms serving two tracks. Çevreyolu is located on 8291st Street, just off of Caher Dudayev Boulevard, in Ataşehir, Çiğli and gets its name from the O-30 beltway (Turkish: Çevreyolu) running just north of the station. Çevreyolu station was opened on 11 April 2017, along with the entire tram line.

There is no transfer from the station.
