= İzmir Kentkart =

Smart card for public transport of İzmir, Turkey

İzmirim Kart
- Location: İzmir Province
- Launched: March 15, 1999
- Operator: İzmir İnovasyon ve Teknoloji A.Ş.
- Manager: İzmir Municipality
- Currency: TL
- Stored-value: Pay as you go
- Credit expiry: None
- Validity: İzmir Metro (subway); İZBAN (commuter railway); ESHOT (buses); İzdeniz (ferries); Tram İzmir (trams); Balçova Gondola (cable car); İzmir Wildlife Park; İzmir International Fair
- Retailed: Online; Newsstands; Stations
- Website: www.izmirimkart.com.tr

The İzmirim Kart is a proximity type smart card used for payment in public transport of İzmir, Turkey.

== See also ==
- Istanbulkart
