= Tram İzmir =

Tram network in İzmir, Turkey

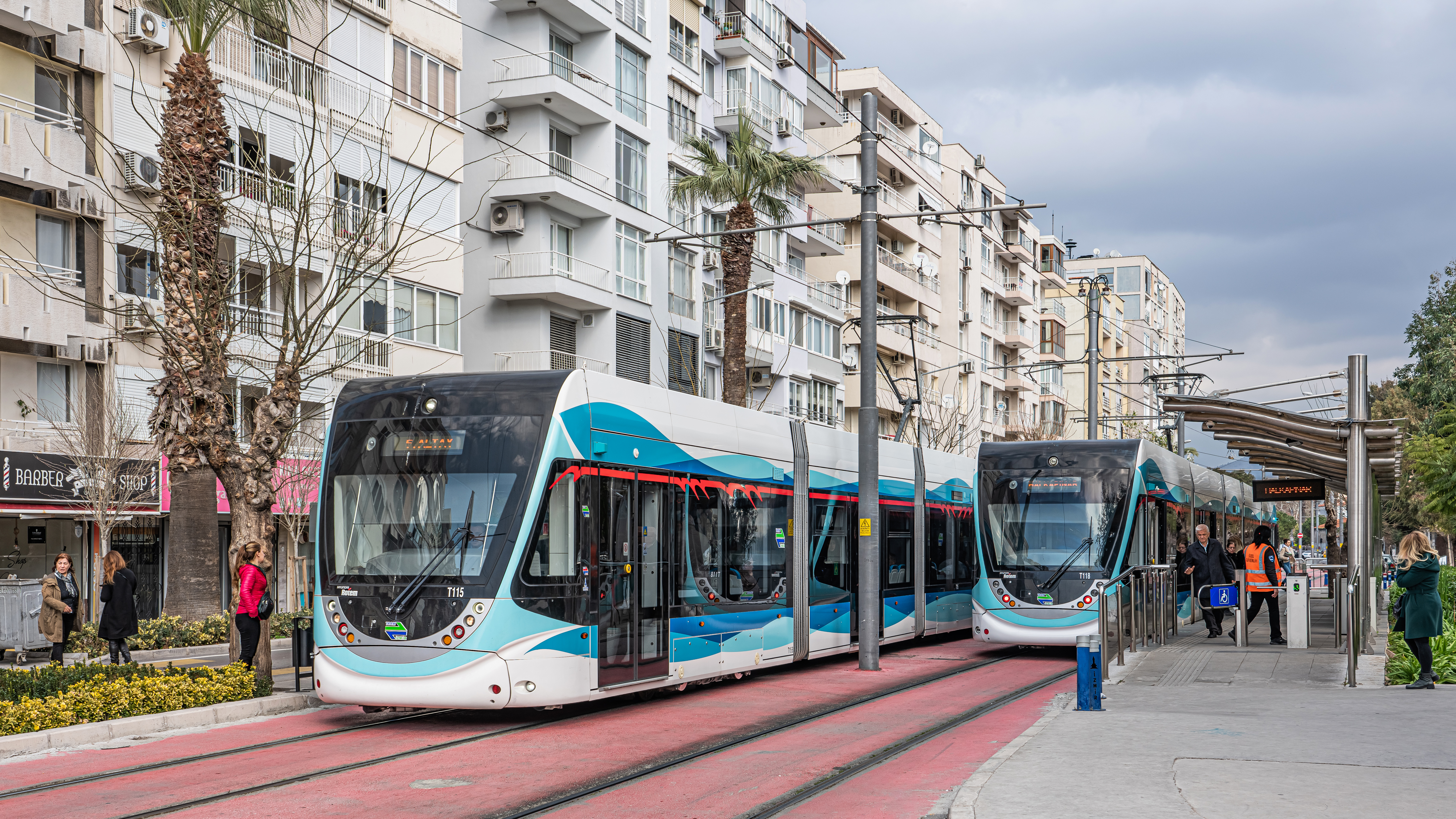
- Two trams at the Atatürk Spor Salonu stop of the Konak Line

Overview
- Owner: İzmir Metropolitan Municipality
- Area served: Karşıyaka, Çiğli and Konak
- Locale: İzmir, Turkey
- Transit type: Tram
- Number of lines: 3
- Number of stations: 47
- Daily ridership: 110,000
- Website: www.tramizmir.com

Operation
- Began operation: 11 April 2017 (Karşıyaka); 24 March 2018 (Konak); 27 January 2024 (Çiğli)
- Operator: İzmir Metro A.Ş.
- Number of vehicles: 38
- Train length: 32 m (105 ft)
- Headway: 10-18 min - Karşıyaka-Çiğli Line 5-10 min - Konak Line

Technical
- System length: 33.6 km (20.9 mi)
- Track gauge: 1,435 mm (4 ft 8 1/2 in) standard gauge
- Electrification: 750 V DC
- Average speed: 24 km/h (15 mph)
- Top speed: 70 km/h (43 mph)

Tram İzmir, alternatively known as İzmir Tram (Turkish: İzmir Tramvayı), is a tram network in İzmir, Turkey. Owned by the İzmir Metropolitan Municipality and operated by İzmir Metro A.Ş., the system consists of three lines: one in Karşıyaka, which opened on 11 April 2017, one in Konak, which opened on 24 March 2018 and one in Çiğli, which opened on 27 January 2024.

The operating length is 33.6 km (20.9 mi) and consists of a total 47 stations. The total cost of these two lines is about ₺450 million (approx. US$120 million).

== History ==
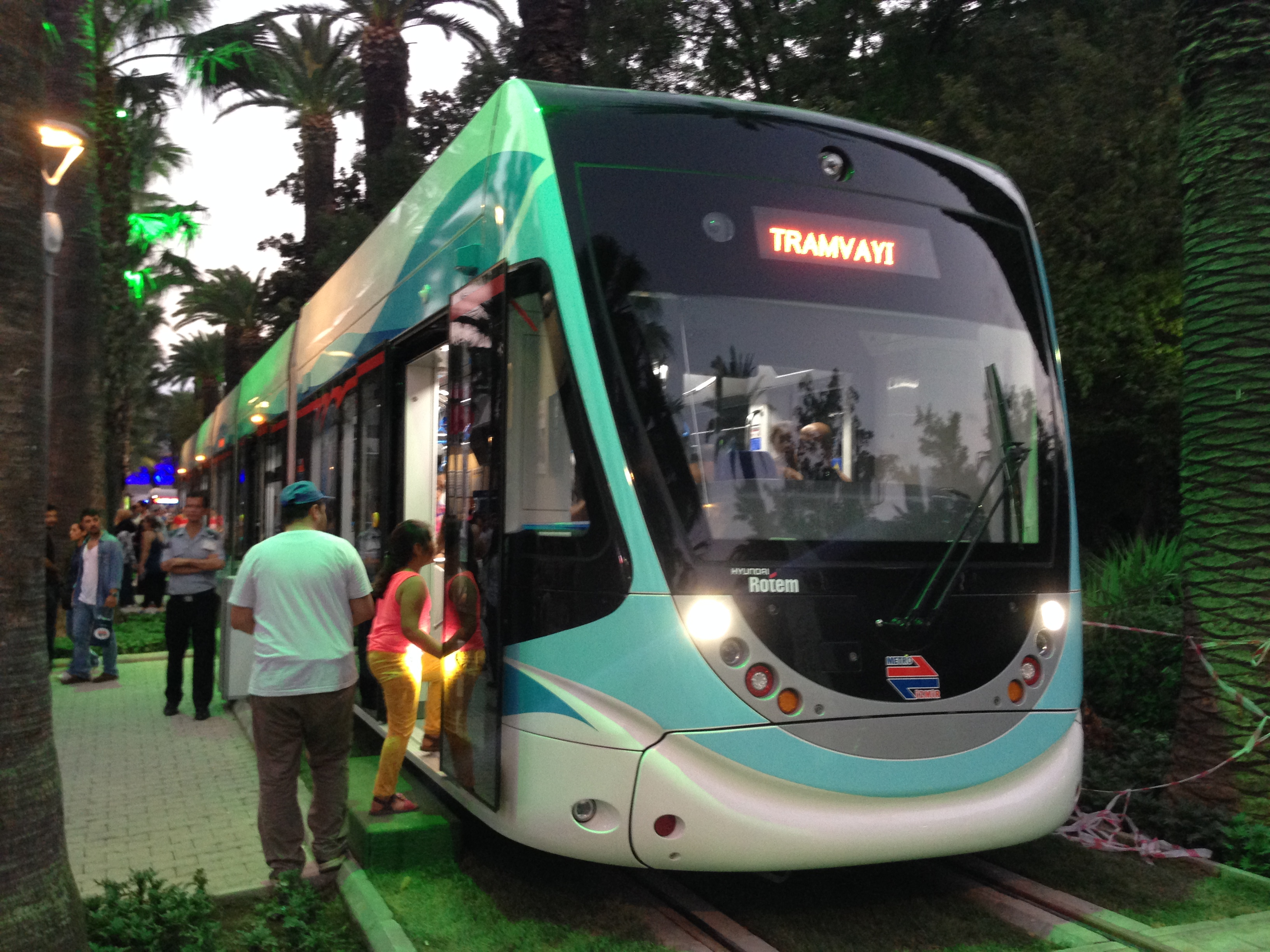
A tram vehicle on display at the 2016 İzmir International Fair

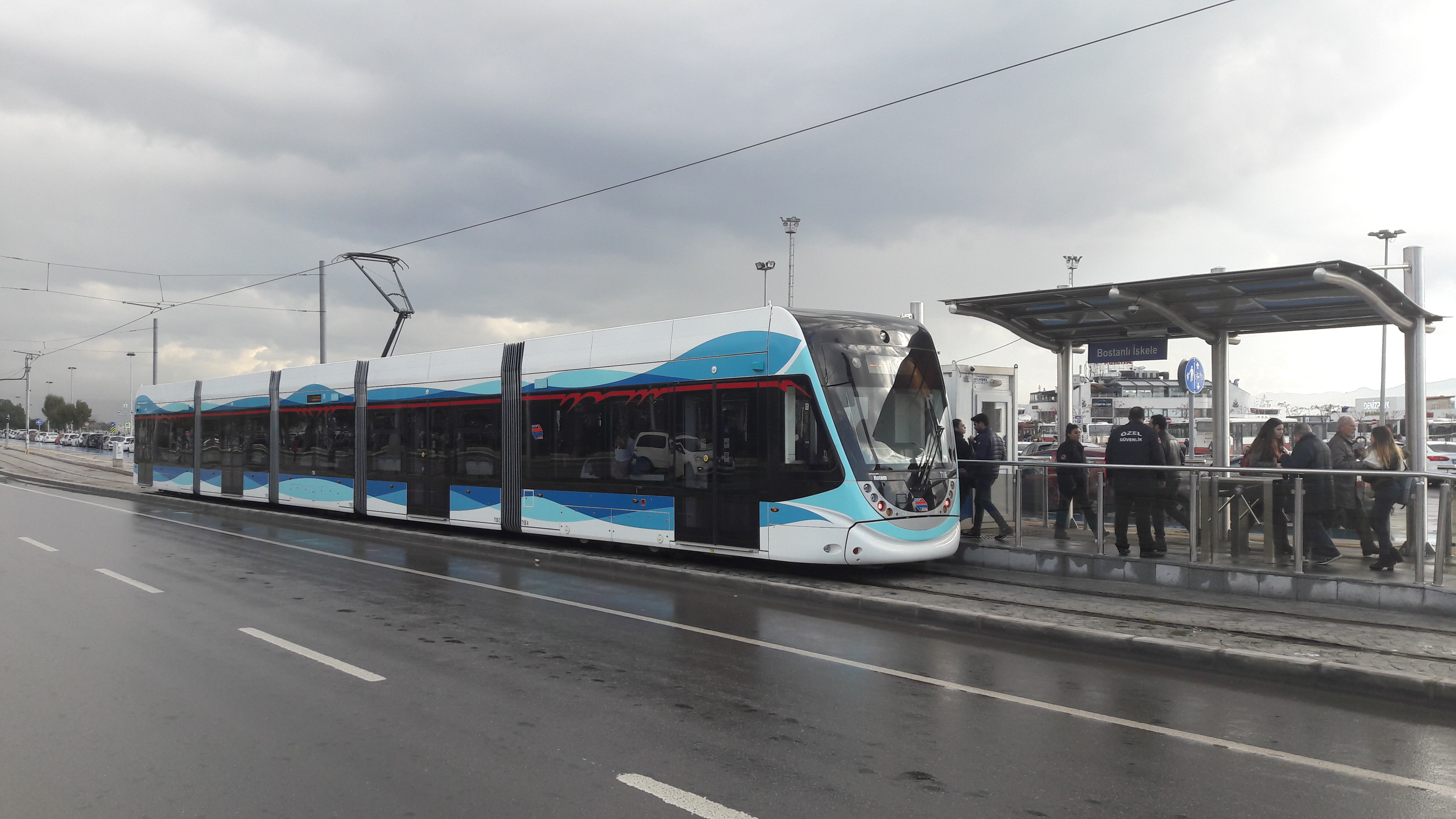
Bostanlı İskele tram station

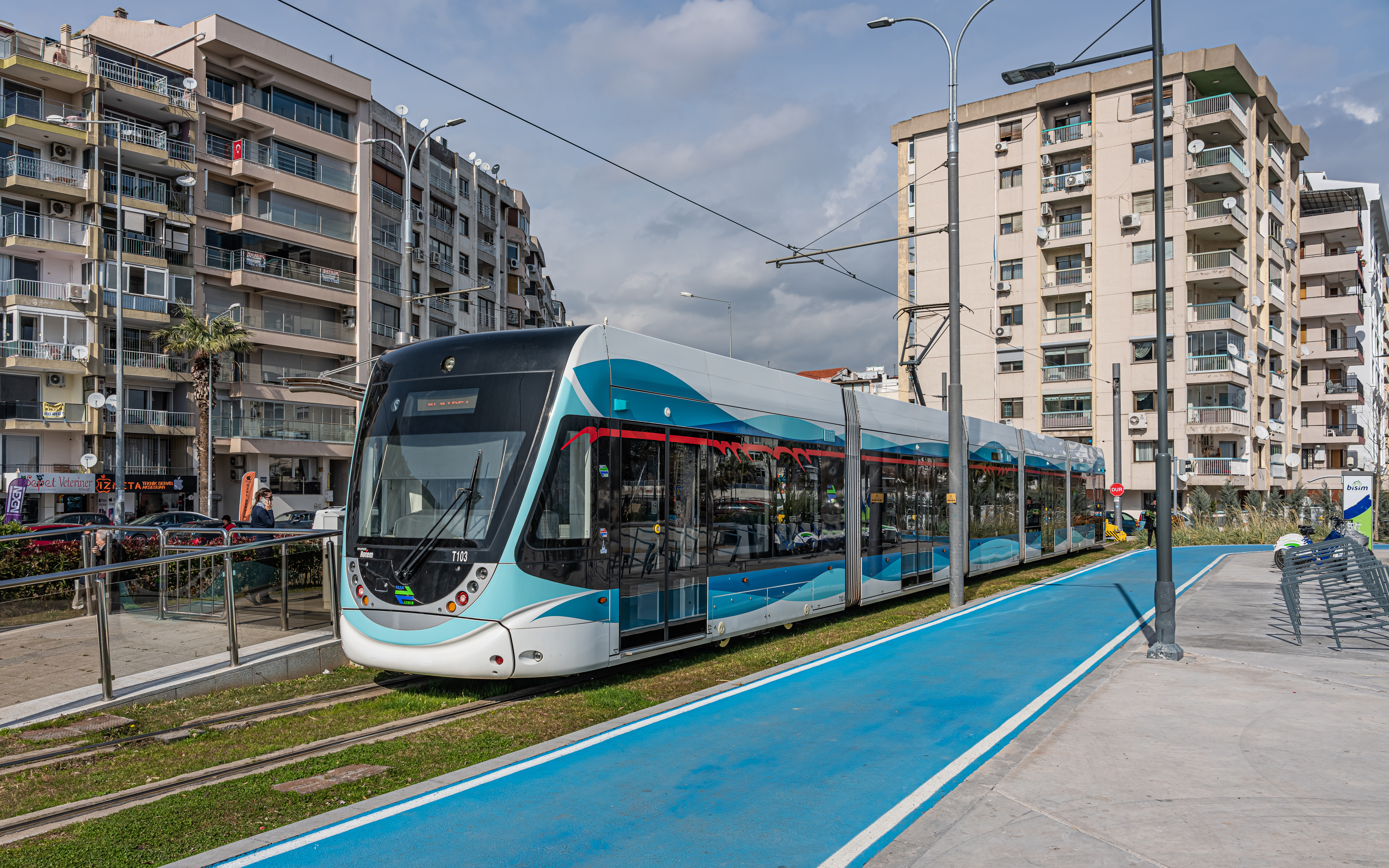
Alaybey tram station

The first tram line in İzmir opened in 1890, between Alsancak Terminal and Pasaport pier. The Alsancak-Pasaport portion was abandoned in 1956 and the last remaining line in İzmir (Konak-Pasaport) was taken up in the early 1960s. Automobile traffic rose greatly in the decades that followed and in the early 2000s, the city was plagued with congestion in central areas.

In 2009, the Metropolitan Municipality released an overall transportation plan for the city. The plan included the construction of three new tram lines: one in Konak, Karşıyaka and in Buca respectively. These three lines were to be integrated with the city's metro line as well as the two commuter rail lines. Construction was originally expected to start by the end of 2011; however, due to the delayed Environmental Impact Report, this date was pushed back to 2015. In 2013, the municipality secured necessary funding from the Ministry of Development and finalized system plans in 2014. In the finalized plan, the Buca Tram line was removed due to pressure from the Ministry of Transport. Construction began in April 2015 on the Karşıyaka Tram, and in November 2015 on the Konak Tram.

The first tram vehicles were delivered in 2016 and showcased at the İzmir International Fair in August of the same year. The rest of the vehicles were delivered in February 2017.

The general name of the system was branded Tram İzmir by the Metropolitan Municipality.

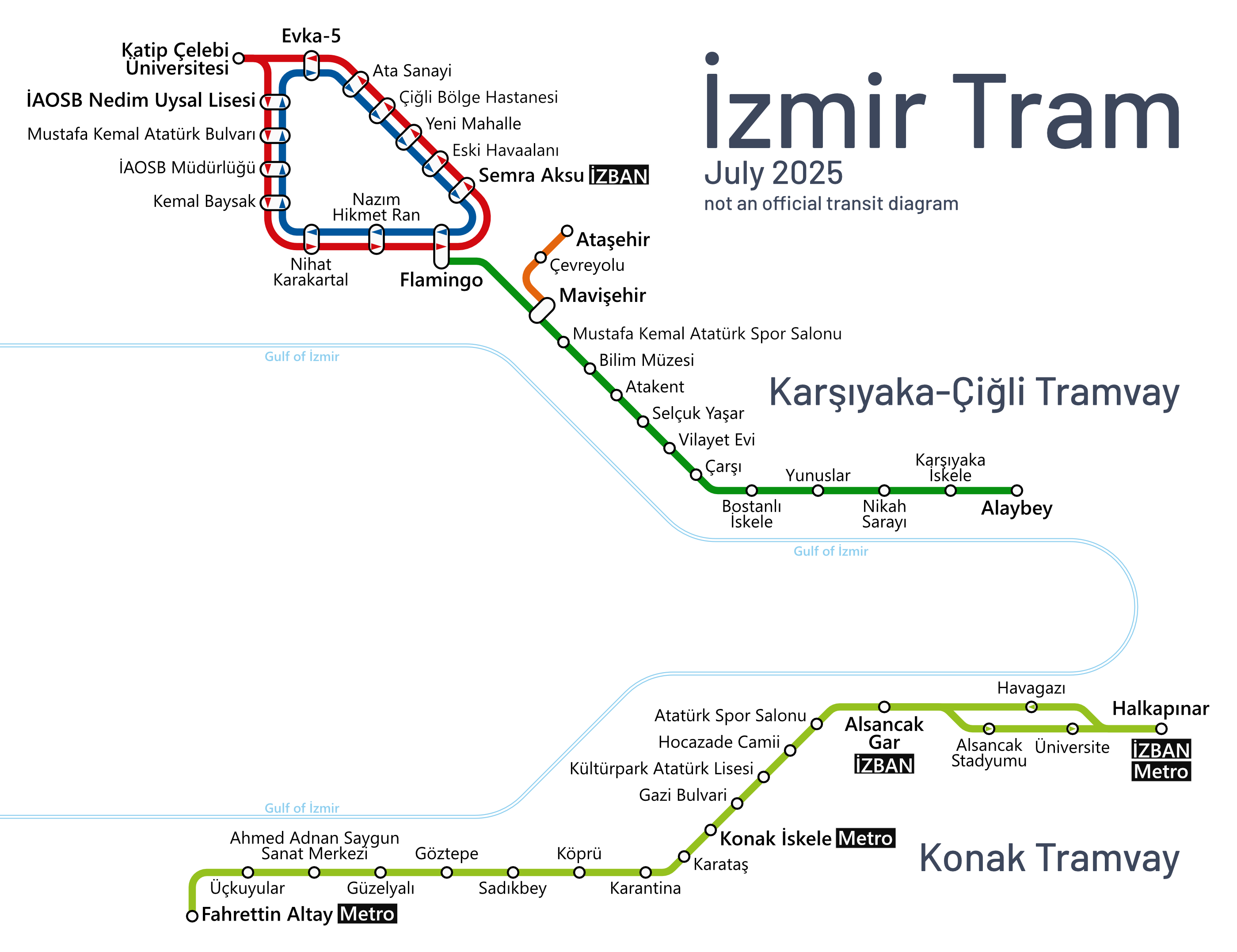
Tram map

== T1 Karşıyaka Tram Line ==
The Karşıyaka Tram is 8.8 km (5.5 mi) long. The tram line is operating with 2 lines. The Alaybey – Flamingo line is named the Green Line, and the Mavişehir – Ataşehir line is named the Orange Line.

Karşıyaka Tram Green Line
Station	Platform	Connection	Notes
Alaybey	1 island platform	İZBAN, bus	Approx. 0.5 km walk between Tram and Izban
Karşıyaka İskele	1 island platform	Ferry, bus	
Nikah Sarayı	1 island platform	None	
Yunuslar	1 island platform	Bus	
Bostanlı İskele	2 side platforms	Ferry, bus	Staggered platforms
Çarşı	2 side platforms	None	
Vilayet Evi	2 side platforms	None	
Selçuk Yaşar	1 island platform	None	
Atakent	2 side platforms	None	
Bilim Müzesi	1 island platform	None	
Mustafa Kemal Atatürk Spor Salonu	1 island platform	Bus	
Mavişehir	1 island platform	T1 Tram (Orange Line)	
Flamingo	1 island platform	T3 Tram (Blue Line), T3 Tram (Red Line), bus	
Karşıyaka Tram Orange Line
Station	Platform	Connection	Notes
Mavişehir	1 island platform	T1 Tram (Green Line)	
Çevreyolu	2 side platforms	None	
Ataşehir	1 island platform	None	Depot is located here.

== T2 Konak Tram Line ==
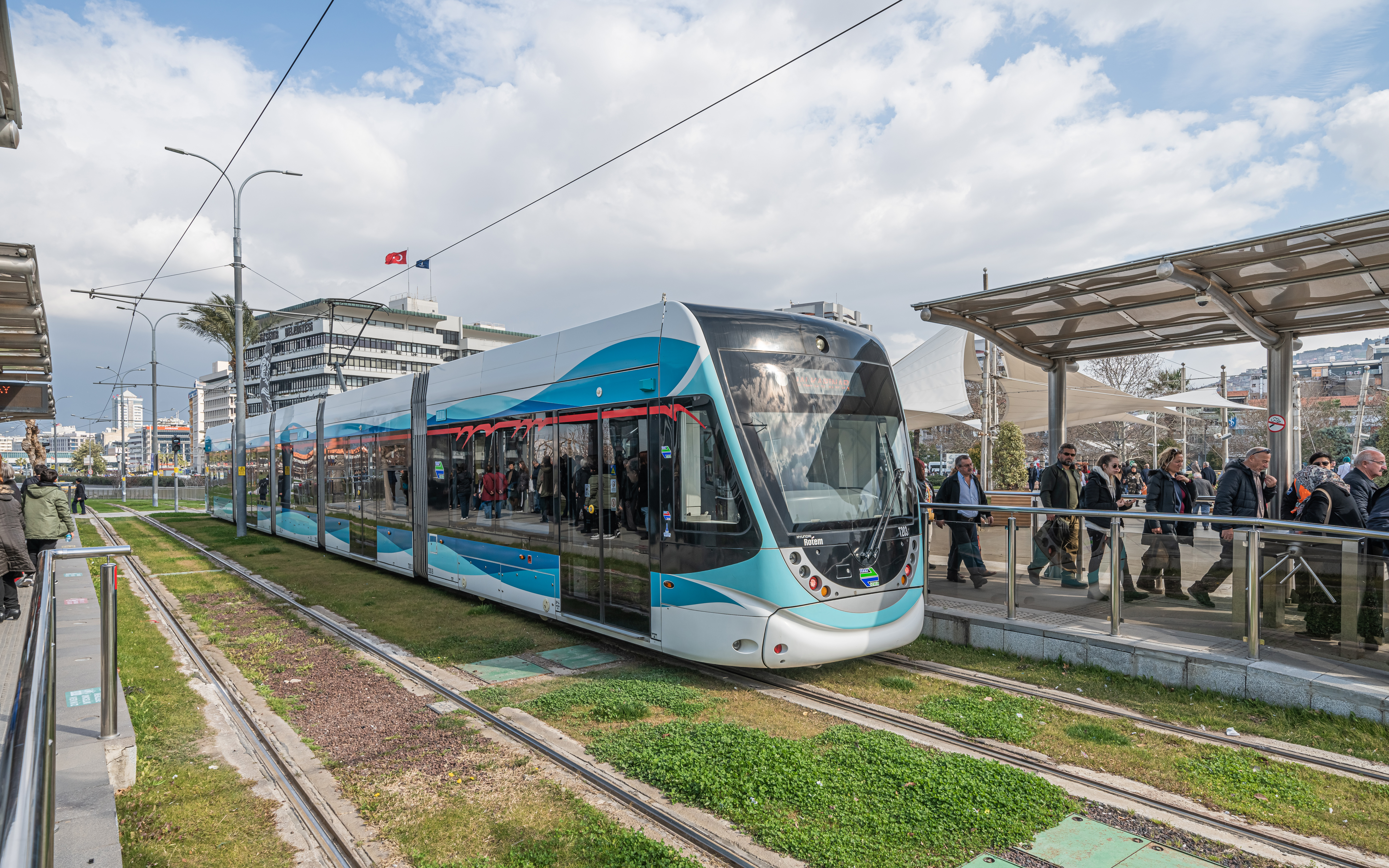
Konak İskele tram station

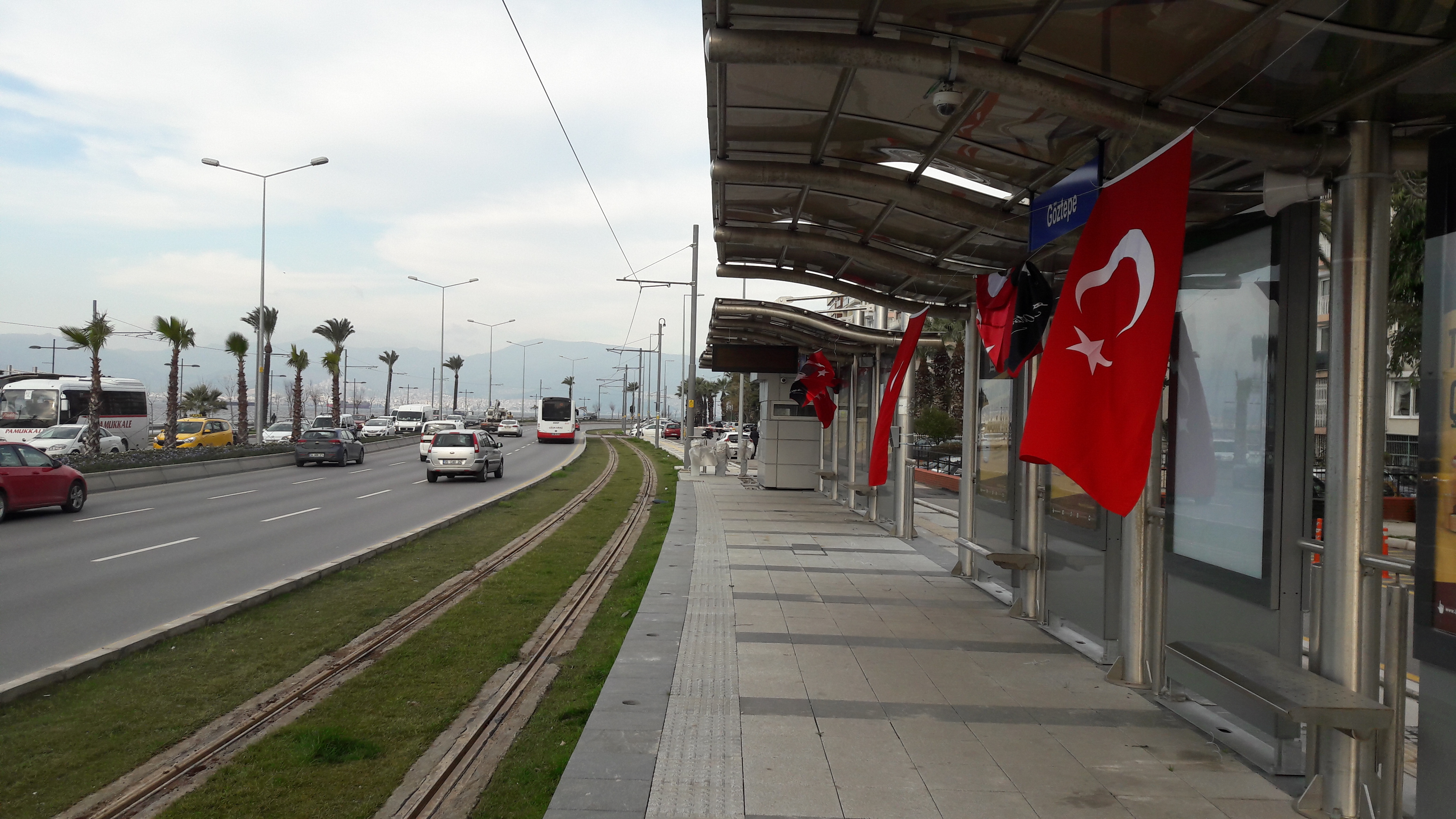
Göztepe tram station

The Konak Tram is 12.6 km (7.8 mi) long. The line serves 19 stations and began operating on 24 April 2018. The entire line is double track. The Halkapinar and Fahrettin Altay bound tracks run on opposite sides of the Mustafa Kemal Sahil Boulevard from Fahrettin Altay station to Sadık Bey Station. Then after Sadık Bey, the two lines run parallel to each other, between the seaside and the west-bound Mustafa Kemal Sahil Boulevard. The Tramline turns inland at Gazi Boulevard and the track runs through the median. The line then turns onto Şair Eşref Boulevard, where the tracks are laid on the left most lane of each direction. The lines split past the Alsancak Train Station with the Halkapınar bound line taking Şehitler Street and the Fahrettin Altay bound track following Liman Street. The lines meet up again along Şehitler Street just before arriving at Halkapınar.

Station	Platform	Connection	Notes
Halkapınar	1 island platform	İZBAN, Metro, bus	Depot is located here.
Üniversite	1 side platform	None	Only Halkapınar bound trams stop here.
Havagazı	1 side platform	None	Only Fahrettin Altay bound trams stop here currently.
Alsancak Stadyumu	1 side platform	None	Only Halkapınar bound trams stop here.
Alsancak Gar	1 island platform	İZBAN, bus	
Atatürk Spor Salonu	2 side platforms	None	
Hocazade Camii	1 island platform	Bus	
Kültürpark - Atatürk Lisesi	1 island platform	Bus	
Gazi Bulvarı	2 side platforms	Metro, bus	
Konak İskele	2 side platforms	Ferry, Metro, bus	
Karataş	2 side platforms	None	
Karantina	2 side platforms	Ferry	
Köprü	2 side platforms	None	Staggered platforms
Sadıkbey	2 side platforms	None	Staggered platforms
Göztepe	2 side platforms	None	Staggered platforms
Güzelyalı	2 side platforms	Ferry	Staggered platforms
Ahmed Adnan Saygun Sanat Merkezi	2 side platforms	Bus	Staggered platforms
Üçkuyular	2 side platforms	Ferry, bus	
Fahrettin Altay	1 island platform	Metro, bus	

== T3 Çiğli Tram Line (ring) ==
The Çiğli Tram is 12 km (7.5 mi) long and serves 14 stations. The tram line operates with the lines, the Red (Outer) Line, and the Blue (Inner) Line. The line opened on 27 January, 2024

Çiğli Tram Red Line
Station	Platform	Connection	Notes
Flamingo	1 island platform	T1 Tram (Green Line), bus	
Semra Aksu	1 island platform	İZBAN, bus	
Eski Havaalanı	1 island platform	None	
Yenimahalle	1 island platform	Bus	
Çiğli Bölge Hastanesi	1 island platform	Bus	
Ata Sanayi	1 island platform	None	
Evka 5	2 side platforms	None	Staggered platforms
Katip Çelebi Üniversitesi	1 island platform	None	Only Red Line trams stop here.
İAOSB Nedim Uysal Lisesi	2 side platforms	Bus	Staggered platforms
Mustafa Kemal Atatürk Bulvarı	2 side platforms	None	Staggered platforms
İAOSB Müdürlüğü	2 side platforms	Bus	Staggered platforms
Kemal Baysak	2 side platforms	None	Staggered platforms
Nihat Karakartal	2 side platforms	None	Staggered platforms
Nazım Hikmet Ran	1 island platform	None	
Flamingo	1 island platform	T1 Tram (Green Line), bus	
Çiğli Tram Blue Line
Station	Platform	Connection	Notes
Flamingo	1 island platform	T1 Tram (Green Line), bus	
Nazım Hikmet Ran	1 island platform	None	
Nihat Karakartal	2 side platforms	None	Staggered platforms
Kemal Baysak	2 side platforms	None	Staggered platforms
İAOSB Müdürlüğü	2 side platforms	Bus	Staggered platforms
Mustafa Kemal Atatürk Bulvarı	2 side platforms	None	Staggered platforms
İAOSB Nedim Uysal Lisesi	2 side platforms	Bus	Staggered platforms
Evka 5	2 side platforms	None	Staggered platforms
Ata Sanayi	1 island platform	None	
Çiğli Bölge Hastanesi	1 island platform	Bus	
Yenimahalle	1 island platform	Bus	
Eski Havaalanı	1 island platform	None	
Semra Aksu	1 island platform	İZBAN, Train, bus	
Flamingo	1 island platform	T1 Tram (Green Line), bus	

== Service ==
The system operates 24/7 with a varying headway. On the Karşıyaka and Çiğli line, there is a ten-minute headway. On the Konak line, Monday through Saturday, there is a six/seven and a half-minute headway. On Sunday, there is a seven and a half/ten-minute headway. In 2018, İzmir Tram transported 110,000 passengers per day.

== Future developments ==
A new line from Yeni Girne to Örnekköy is in its tender phase. Construction was set to begin in early 2024.

== Infrastructure ==
The system operates on its own right of way as well as automobile lanes, despite the latter utilized less so, and is electrified with 750 V DC overhead wire and consists of Communications-based train control (CBTC) signalling. Most of the network is double-tracked, except for a short portion between Karşıyaka pier and Alaybey. The tracks are standard track gauge at 1,435 mm (4 ft 8 ^{1}/_{2} in).Both lines will have their own storage and maintenance depots, in Mavişehir and Halkapınar respectively. The tramcars are produced by Hyundai Rotem plant in Adapazarı. The double-ended 32 m (105 ft)-long five-module tramcars are each 43.1 t heavy. They have 48 seating capacity, and can carry up to 285 passengers each. Service speed is 24 km/h (15 mph), and top speed is 70 km/h (43 mph).

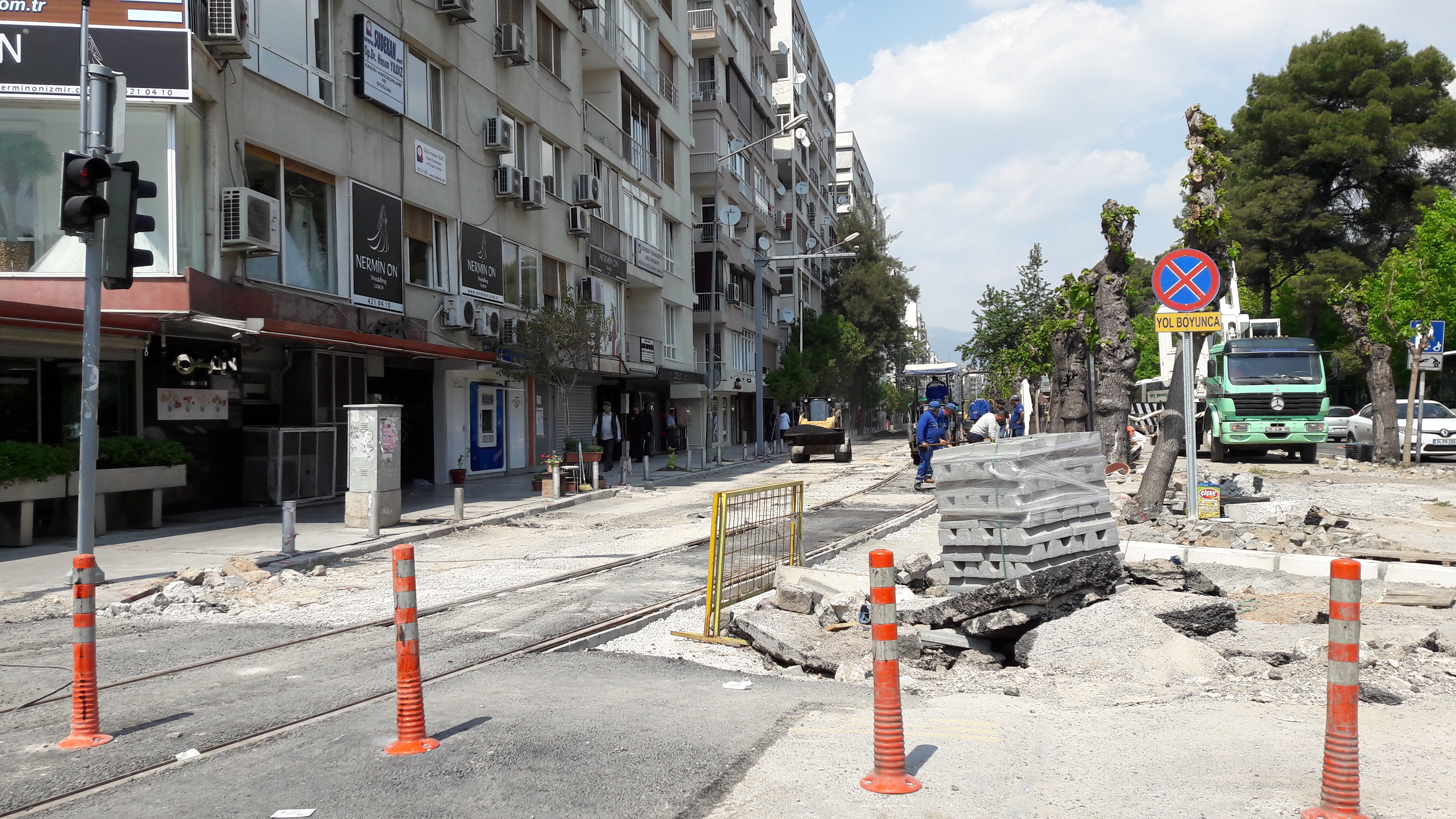
Tram construction in Alsancak

Each station is wheelchair-accessible and consists of its own platform, segregated from any sidewalk or street. Information panels showing the real-time status of the next tram are installed in all operating stations.

== See also ==
- Transport in Izmir
- Rail transport in Izmir
- Izmir Metro
- Trams in Izmir
