= İzmir Wildlife Park =

Nonprofit zoo in İzmir, Turkey

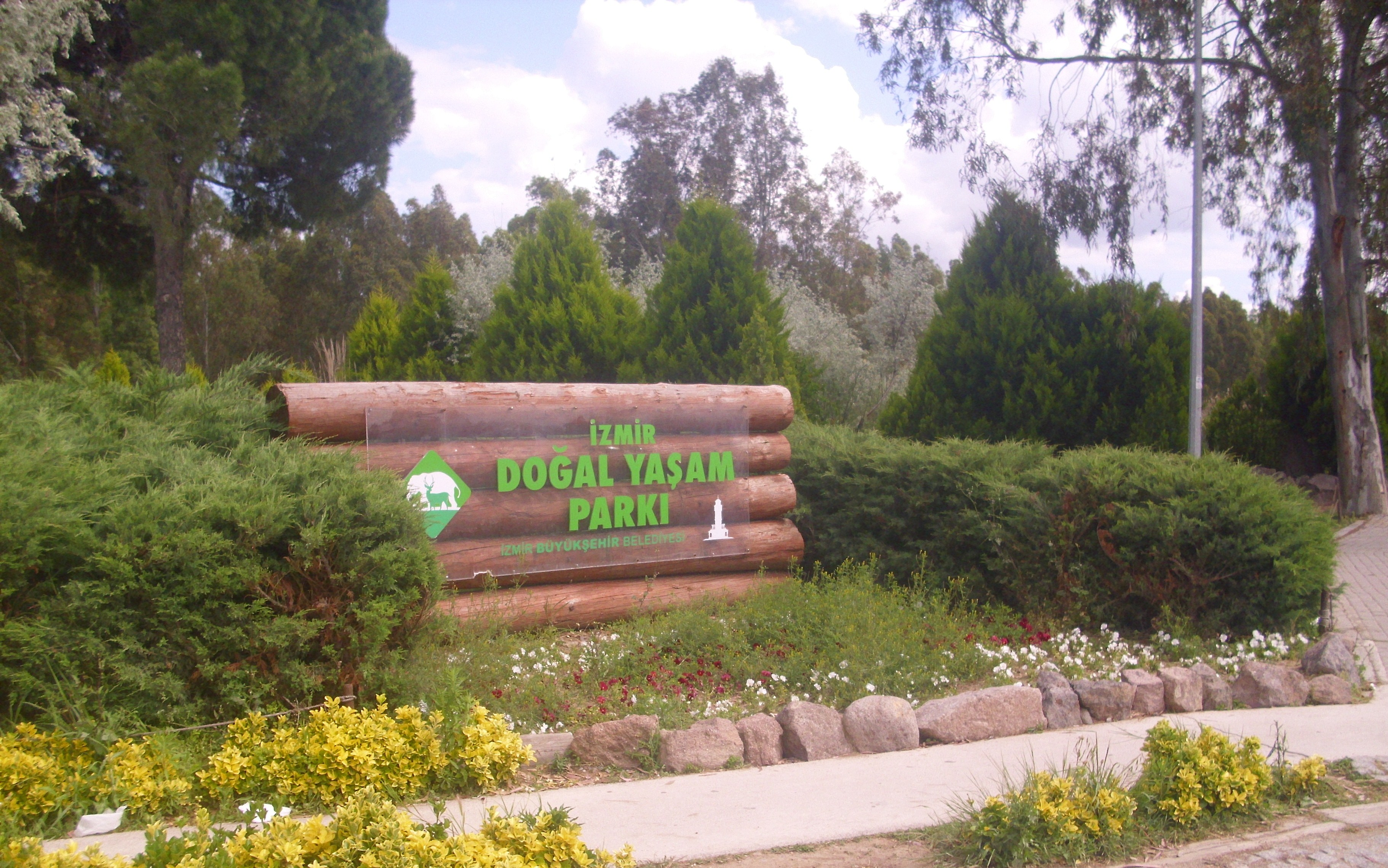
- Interactive map of İzmir Wildlife Park
- 38°29′28″N 26°57′49″E
- Date opened: 30 November 2008; 17 years ago
- Location: Çiğli, İzmir, Turkey
- Land area: 425,000 m^{2}
- No. of animals: ~1,800 (2023)
- No. of species: 132 (2023)
- Annual visitors: 877,117 (2022)
- Memberships: EAZA
- Owner: İzmir Metropolitan Municipality
- Website: www.izmirdogalyasamparki.org.tr

İzmir Wildlife Park (Turkish: İzmir Doğal Yaşam Parkı) is a non-profit zoo in İzmir, Turkey. It was opened on 30 November 2008 following the closure of the İzmir Zoo. The park, which has nearly 1,800 animals from 132 species, was established on an area of 425,000 m^{2} in the district of Çiğli. It is a member of the European Association of Zoos and Aquaria. Animals brought from the closed İzmir Zoo and from abroad are exhibited in their natural environments. Around 900 thousand people visit the park annually.

== History ==
The construction of İzmir Wildlife Park started in 2006, after it was decided to close the İzmir Zoo, which was opened in 1937 as Turkey's first zoo and located within Kültürpark, and to move its animals to the new area in Çiğli. İzmir Wildlife Park, which was built on an area of 425,000 m^{2} with a construction cost of 21 million lira, was opened by İzmir Metropolitan Municipality on 30 November 2008. It has been a member of the European Association of Zoos and Aquaria since 3 April 2011. In 2013, it was deemed worthy of an award in the "municipal services, landscape and environment" category by the Organization of Islamic Capitals and Cities, which was established within the Organization of Islamic Cooperation. Infrastructure renovation work was carried out in the park in December 2023.

== Animals and exhibits ==
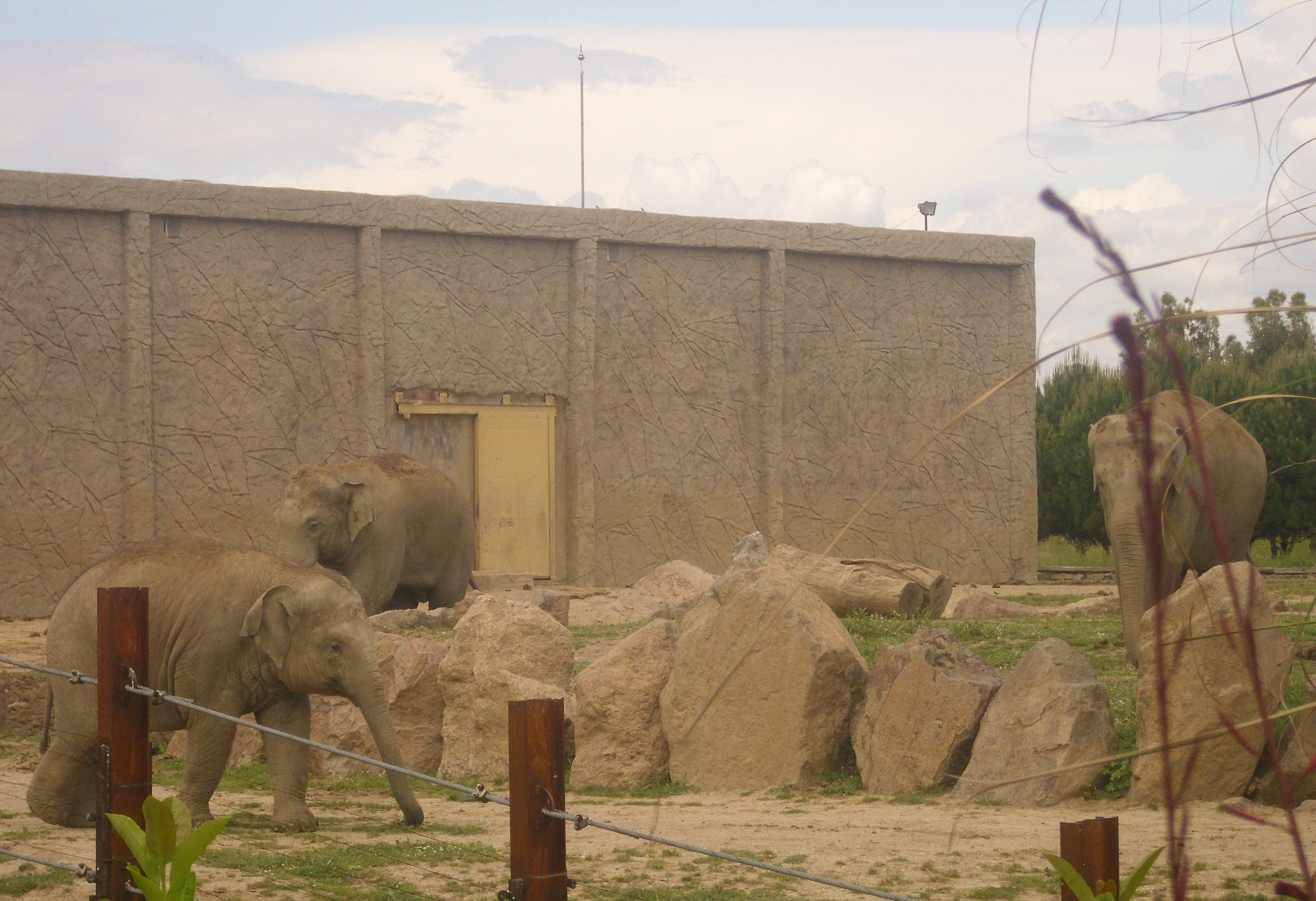
Asian elephants in the park

As of November 2023, there are nearly 1,800 animals from 132 species in İzmir Wildlife Park. Swans, ducks and waterfowl are exhibited in the 8,450 m^{2} pond. There are giraffes, wildebeests, zebras, hippos, ostriches and nyalas in the African savannah, which is built on an area of 18,000 m^{2}. Monkeys, Vervet monkeys and black macaques live in the 6,600 m^{2} monkey islands, which consists of two islands. Eagles, hawks, vultures and owls are exhibited in the birds of prey section, established on an area of 2,000 m^{2}. The 3,000 m^{2} Poultry Shelter houses waterfowl, ducks, geese, white wagtails, storks, partridges and ibises. In the section called Children's Zoo, there are small horses, dwarf goats, Cameroon sheep, rabbits, chickens, turkeys, and land and water turtles. Tropical Center, which is the first of its kind in Turkey, is 2,300 m^{2} in size and has 66 animals from 18 species. Some of these include snakes, lizards, crocodiles, turtles, fish, macaws, marmosets, and fruit bats. There is an area of 14,500 m^{2} for Asian elephants in the park. Some of the other mammals found in the park include kangaroos, meerkats, ground squirrels, guinea pigs, coatis, gazelles, fallow deer, red deer, camels, wild goats, hyenas, bears, wolves, lynxes, ring-tailed lemurs, pumas, lions and tigers. Other birds exhibited in the park include white pelican, crested pelican, peacock, pheasant and parrot.
