= Alaybey (Tram İzmir) =

LRT station in İzmir, Turkey

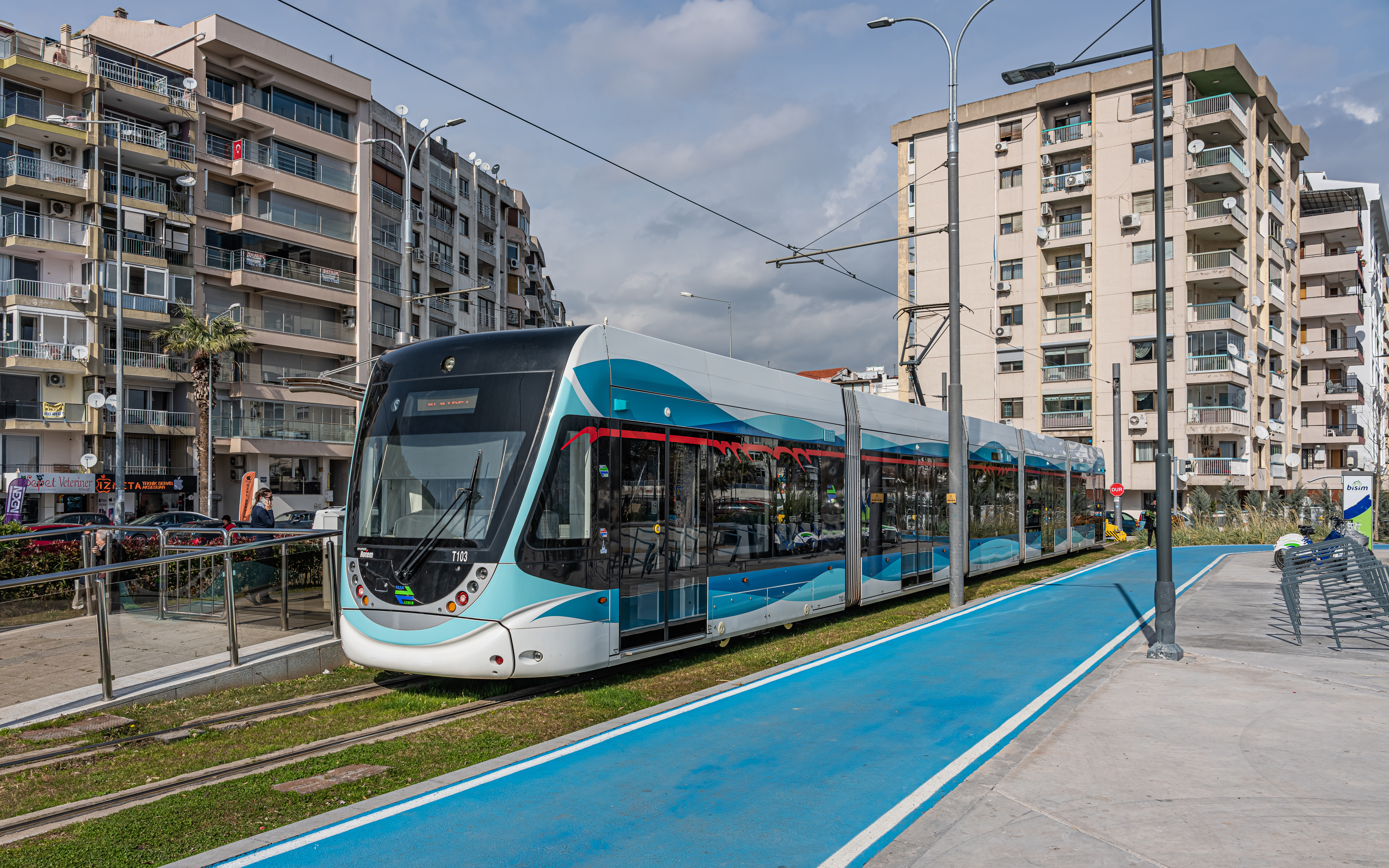

General information
- Location: Cemal Gürsel Cd., Tershane Mah., 35600; Karşıyaka
- Coordinates: 38.4601°N 27.1271°E
- System: Tram İzmir light-rail station
- Owner: İzmir Metropolitan Municipality
- Operator: İzmir Metro A.Ş.
- Line: T1 Green Line
- Platforms: 1 island platform
- Tracks: 2
- Connections: İZBAN at Alaybey railway station ESHOT Bus: 121, 196, 200, 290, 330, 543, 920

Construction
- Accessible: Yes

History
- Opened: 11 April 2017

Services
Preceding station	Tram İzmir	Following station
Karşıyaka İskele towards Flamingo	T1 Green Line	Terminus
Location

Alaybey is the eastern terminus of the Karşıyaka Tram in İzmir, Turkey. The station consists of an island platform serving two tracks and the station was opened on 11 April 2017.

There is a transfer from the station to the İZBAN line and ESHOT buses. Alaybey İZBAN station lies about 490 m (1,610 ft) west of the tram station.

The station is located along Cemal Gürsel Avenue, on the waterfront.
