= Flamingo (Tram İzmir) =

LRT station in İzmir, Turkey

General information
- Location: Nazım Hikmet Ran Blv., Ataşehir Mah., 35630; Çiğli
- Coordinates: 38.4862°N 27.0596°E
- System: Tram İzmir light-rail station
- Owner: İzmir Metropolitan Municipality
- Operator: İzmir Metro A.Ş.
- Line: T1 Green Line T3 Red (Outer) Line T3 Blue (Inner) Line
- Platforms: 1 island platform
- Tracks: 2
- Connections: ESHOT Bus: 423, 442, 595, 816, 817

Construction
- Accessible: Yes

History
- Opened: 27 January 2024

Services
Preceding station	Tram İzmir	Following station
Terminus	T1 Green Line	Mavişehir towards Alaybey
Nazım Hikmet Ran clockwise / inner	T3 Red (Outer) Line	Semra Aksu anticlockwise / outer
Semra Aksu anticlockwise / outer	T3 Blue (Inner) Line	Nazım Hikmet Ran clockwise / inner
Location

Flamingo is a Turkish light-rail interchange station on Karşıyaka Tram Green Line, Çiğli Tram Blue Line and Çiğli Tram Red Line of the Tram İzmir network. It is also the terminus station of the Karşıyaka Tram Green Line. Station located in the residential neighborhood of Ataşehir, Çiğli on Nazım Hikmet Ran Boulevard. The station was opened on 27 January 2024.

The name of this stop, formerly known as Ataşehir Kavşağı, was changed to Flamingo in June 2025.

== Connections ==
There is a transfer from the station to the ESHOT buses.

ESHOT Bus service
Route number	Stop	Route	Location
423	Söğüt	Şirinevler — Bostanlı İskele	Nazım Hikmet Ran Boulevard
442	Söğüt	Atatürk Mahallesi — Bostanlı İskele	Nazım Hikmet Ran Boulevard
595	Söğüt	9 Eylül Mahallesi — Bostanlı İskele	Nazım Hikmet Ran Boulevard
816	Söğüt	Çiğli Bölge Eğitim Hastanesi — Egekent Aktarma Merkezi	Nazım Hikmet Ran Boulevard
817	Söğüt	Egekent Aktarma Merkezi — Çiğli Aktarma Merkezi	Nazım Hikmet Ran Boulevard
