= ESHOT =

Bus service in İzmir, Turkey

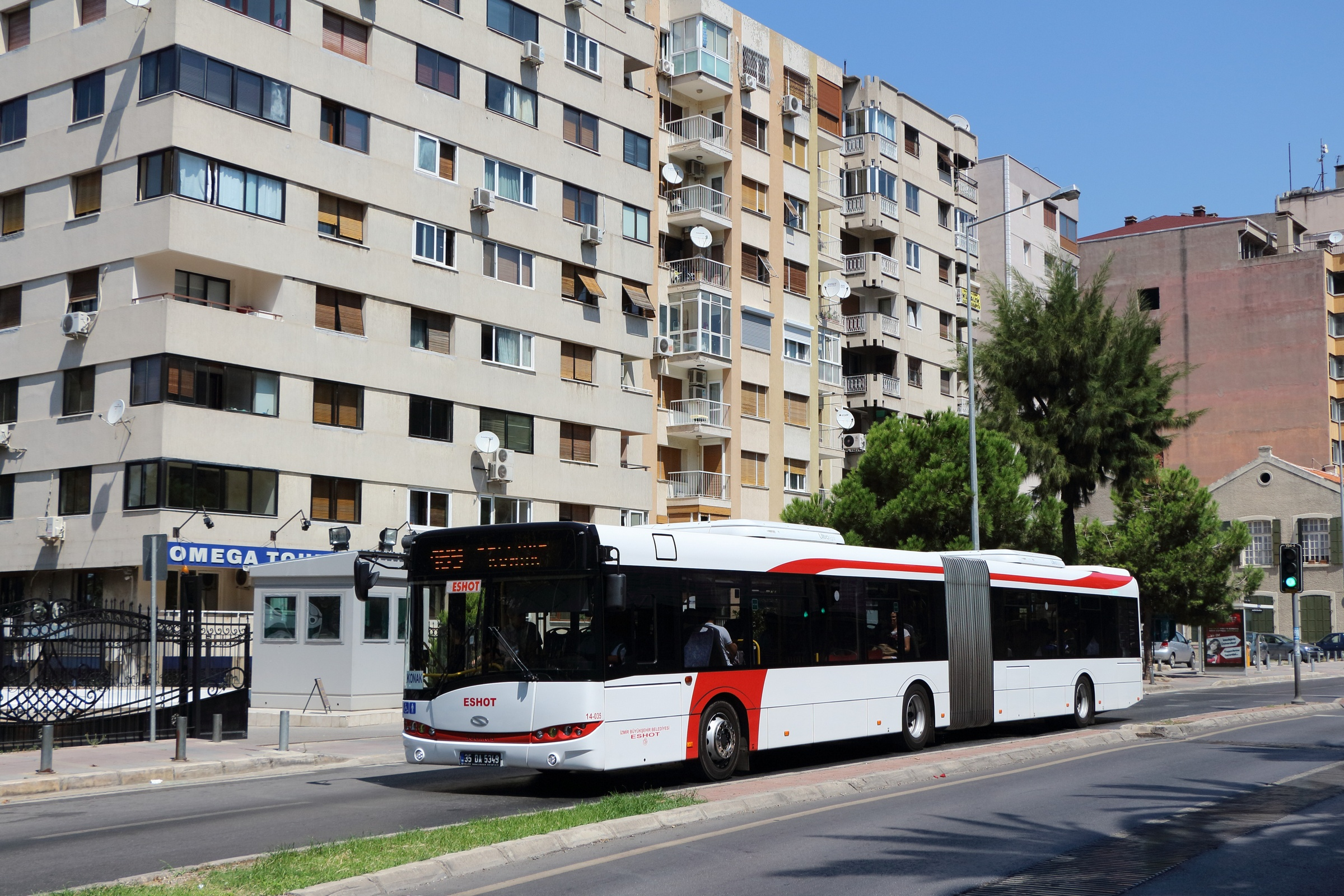
- ESHOT Solaris Urbino 18 bus in August 2014
- Parent: İzmir Municipality
- Founded: July 27, 1943
- Headquarters: Fuar İzmir
- Locale: İzmir Province
- Service area: Provincial boundary of İzmir
- Service type: Local, Limited Stop bus service
- Routes: 415
- Hubs: Halkapınar Metro, Konak, Üçyol Transfer Station, Egekent Transfer Station, Fahrettin Altay Roundabout, Fahrettin Altay Terminus, Bostanlı İskele, Evka-3 Transfer Station, Gaziemir Neighbours Hub, Ninth September University Entrance, Pancar station, Biçerova station, Aliağa station, Bayındır municipal square
- Stations: Evka 4, Evka 3, Aydoğdu neighbourhood, Çamlıkule, İnkılap, Cengizhan, Egekent, Onur neighbourhood, Urla garage, Uzundere, Gaziemir Socialized District, Torbalı garage, Menderes central stop, Bergama industrial district, Dikili garage, Ödemiş garage
- Depots: Gediz, Adatepe, Çiğli, Soğukkuyu, Mersinli, Adatepe, Çakalburnu, Çaybaşı
- Fleet: 1,459 buses (983 solo, 404 articulated, 72 Midibus
- Daily ridership: 2.832.909 daily
- Fuel type: #2 Diesel (Diesel-fueled buses); Direct current (Electric buses)
- Operator: ESHOT Genel Müdürlüğü
- COO: Erhan BEY
- Website: ESHOT

Elektrik Su Havagazı Otobüs Troleybüs (English: Electricity, Water, Coal Gas, Bus, Trolleybus) or ESHOT is a bus service operating in the İzmir. ESHOT, along with İZULAŞ are the two main bus transit services in İzmir. Buses serve all districts, however, denser network presence attained in the central area. ESHOT is owned by the İzmir Municipality (İBB).

== History ==
Before ESHOT was formed, all of İzmir's public services were operated by several companies. ESHOT Genel Müdürlüğü was formed on July 27, 1943, to take over the İzmir Tram and Electric Company. This company operated all trams, trolleybuses and electric facilities in the city. In 1945, ESHOT took over the İzmir Coal Gas Company and on June 5, 1947 ESHOT took over the İzmir Suları A.Ş. to have control over all the cities main facilities. ESHOT operated the İzmir trolleybus system, which lasted from 1954 to 1992. ESHOT started printing their own paper on June 11, 1957, for new information on all public utilities. By 1959, ESHOT began producing refurbished buses under the direction of Ismail Faruk Paksoy, director of Eshot. In the 1960s, the Kordon trolley line was abandoned. ESHOT started operating province-wide starting December 11, 1980. On September 12, 1982, the Turkish Electric Company took over all electric operations from ESHOT. The İzmir Municipality became the parent company of ESHOT on June 27, 1984. İZSU Company was formed on March 25, 1987 to operate all water facilities in İzmir and on July 1, 1987 ESHOT turned over all water operations to İZSU. On September 1, 1994, the Coal gas factory in Alsancak closed down, leaving ESHOT only in-charge of city bus operations.

== Connections ==
ESHOT has many interchanges with the national railway carrier, the Turkish State Railways, the city metro system, the İzmir Metro, the city ferry system, and the 2 city airports.

== Eshot Otobüs Hatları ( 01.04.2025 ) ==
....5 Narlıdere - Üçkuyular İskele

....6 Arıkent - Üçkuyular İskele

....7 Sahil Evleri - Üçkuyular İskele

....8 Güzelbahçe - F. Altay Akt. Merkezi

....9 Öz Zümrüt Evleri - Siteler

..10 Üçkuyular İskele - Konak

..15 İnönü Mah. - Konak

..16 Vatan Mah. - Üçyol Metro

..17 Uzundere Toplu Konutlar - F. Altay Akt. Merkezi

..18 Yeşilyurt - Konak

..19 Şehitler - Konak

..20 Koop. Evleri - Konak

..21 Halil Rıfat Paşa - Konak

..23 Uzundere - Konak

ESHOT has many routes. Some of the routes are:

- 8 Güzelbahçe-Fahrettin Altay Terminus via Mithatpaşa Avenue
- 18 Vatan-Yeşilyurt-Konak via Üçyol
- 23 Uzundere-Konak via Eski İzmir Street, Eşrefpaşa (goes through Çankaya on return trip: this is a quasi-loop line)
- 60 Pınarbaşı-Kemer via former Kemalpaşa road
- 70 Tınaztepe-Halkapınar via Buca, Eşrefpaşa, Çankaya, Alsancak
- 80 Arapdere-Halkapınar via Bozyaka, Eşrefpaşa, Çankaya, Alsancak
- 90 Gaziemir-Halkapınar via Yeşillik Road, Eşrefpaşa, Çankaya, Alsancak
- 104 Tınaztepe-Konak via Adatepe, Buca, Menderes Avenue, Eşrefpaşa (looping on return through Çankaya)
- 118 ESHOT-Evka 4 via Yeşillik Avenue, Yeşildere, Çamkıran, Osmangazi
- 147 Postacılar-Halkapınar via Yeni Girne Boulevard, Bayraklı by the railway
- 152 Gaziemir-Konak via Yeşillik Avenue, Üçyol
- 193 Yurtoğlu-Konak via Cennetçeşme, Rasime Şeyhoğlu Street, Eski İzmir, Eşrefpaşa
- 226 Atatürk OIZ-Bostanlı Express
- 240 Elit Sitesi-Halkapınar via Yeni Girne, Altınyol
- 249 Evka 4-Kemer Station via Osmangazi, Adalet Neighbourhood, Fatih Avenue
- 304 Tınaztepe-Konak Atatürk Arts Center via Hasanağa, Menderes Avenue, Konak Tunnel
- 390 Tınaztepe-Bornova via Dokuz Eylül University, Otoyol 30 (limited service express)
- 443 Egekent-Bostanlı Pier via Çiğli, Cahar Dudayev Road
- 510 Gaziemir-Balçova via Otoyol 30
- 515 Tınaztepe-Bornova via Buca, Yeşildere, Mersinli, Manavkuyu
- 565 Evka 4-Bornova via İnönü Neighbourhood
- 599 Cengizhan-Halkapınar via Muhittin Erener, Bayraklı
- 681 Fahrettin Altay terminus-Basmane via Hatay, Çankaya
- 690 Tınaztepe-Fahrettin Altay terminus via Dokuz Eylül University, Otoyol 30, Mehmetçik Road (limited service express)
- 800 Menemen Rail

== Color coding ==
ESHOT has a color coding to distinguish which depot a bus comes from. ESHOT stickers bearing the colored ESHOT emblem and the acronym "ESHOT" are glued on the upper-right part of the windscreen and upper-middle part of rearview glass on every ESHOT line bus.

| Color | Operational branch | Main depot |
|---|---|---|
| Blue sticker | Branch 1 | Gaziemir and Torbalı depots |
| Green sticker | Branch 2 | Çiğli and Bergama depots |
| Red sticker | Branch 3 | Mersinli depot and Çınarlı parking area |
| Black sticker | Branch 4 | Adatepe depot |
| Orange sticker | Branch 5 | Çakalburnu and Urla depots |

== See also ==
- Trolleybuses in Izmir
