= List of parks in Izmir =

The following is a partial list of the noteworthy parks in and around the city of İzmir, Turkey. Also indicated are the names of İzmir metropolitan districts where each park is located, as well as the neighborhood, approximate in some cases, where each park is found.

== Major Parks ==
- Kültürpark – Alsancak, Konak
- Aşık Veysel Rekreasyon Alanı (Aşık Veysel Recreational Area) - Bornova
- Yedi Göller, Buca (Seven Lakes) – İzkent, Buca
- Buca Gölet (Buca Pond) – Kaynaklar, Buca
- Turkuvaz Park – İnciraltı, Balçova

== Large Urban Parks ==
- Büyük Park (Greater Park) – Bornova
- Küçük Park (Smaller Park) – Bornova
- Hasanağa Bahçesi – Buca
- Çamkıran Park – Bornova
- Osman Bey Park – Karşıyaka
- Hürriyet Parkı (Liberty Park) – Bahçelievler, Konak
- Yeşil Vadi Parkı (Green Valley Park) – Halilrıfatpaşa, Konak
- Gözlüklü Martı Parkı (Bespectacled Seagull Park) – Üçkuyular, Konak
- Güzel Sanatlar Parkı (Fine Arts Park) – Üçkuyular, Konak
- Adnan Süvari Park – Göztepe, Konak
- Adnan Kahveci Park – Yeşilyurt, Konak
- Susuzdede Parkı – Göztepe, Konak

== Nature Parks ==
- İzmir Doğal Yaşam Parkı (Park of Natural Life) – Sasalı, Çiğli
