= İzmir Parachute Tower =

- İzmir Paraşüt Kulesi
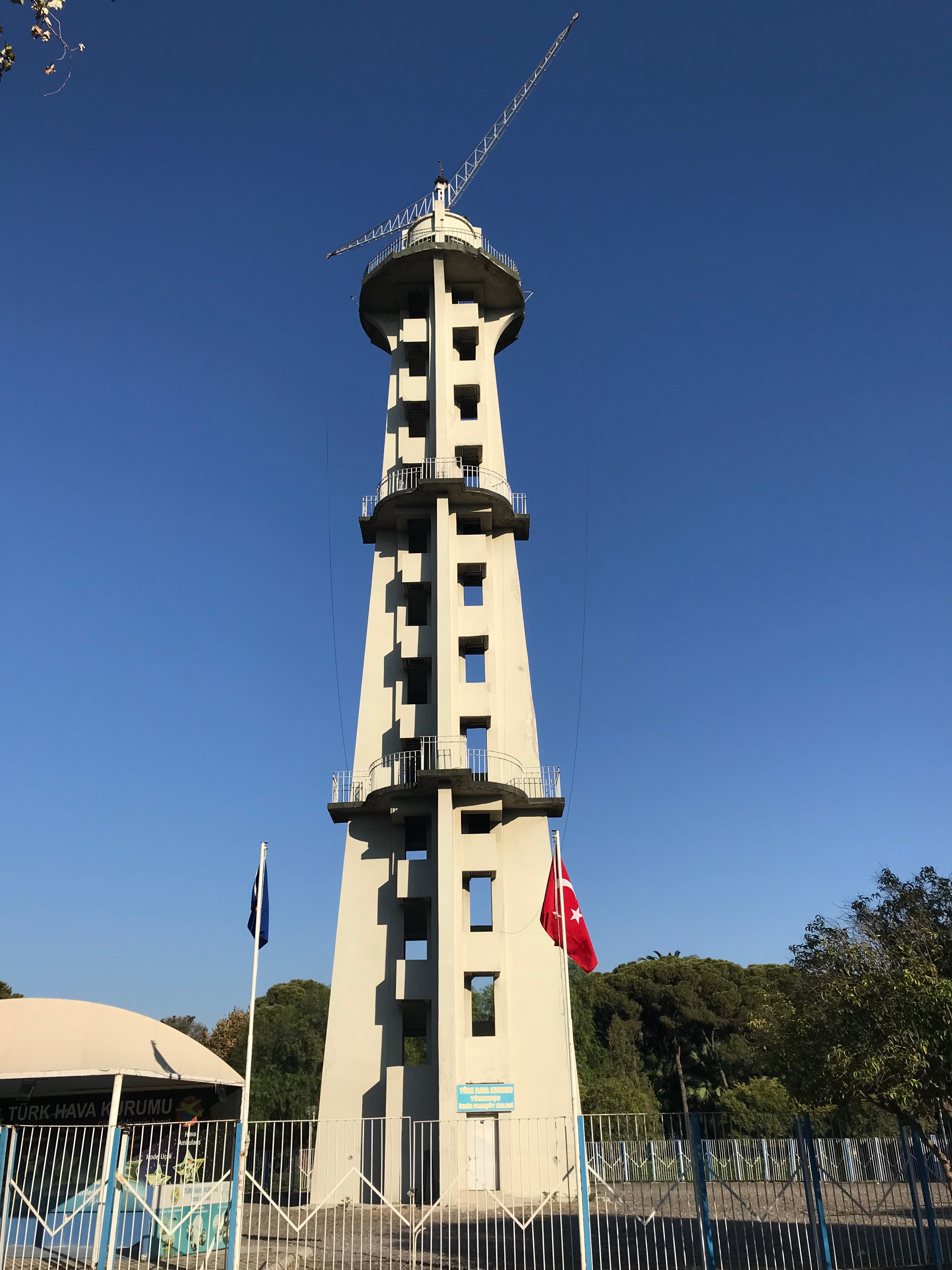
- Interactive map of the İzmir Parachute Tower area

General information
- Type: Parachute tower
- Location: Kültürpark, İzmir, Turkey
- Coordinates: 38°25′38.8″N 27°08′39.1″E
- Elevation: 4.5 metres (15 ft)
- Construction started: 1935
- Completed: 1937
- Opened: 20 August 1937
- Cost: ₺38,758.61
- Owner: Turkish Aeronautical Association

Height
- Height: 48 metres (157 ft)

Technical details
- Structural system: Reinforced concrete
- Floor count: 3
- Lifts/elevators: 1

Design and construction
- Architects: Bedri Tümay; Algrandi
- Engineer: Muammer Tansu

İzmir Parachute Tower (Turkish: İzmir Paraşüt Kulesi) is a parachute tower located within Kültürpark in İzmir, Turkey. It was built in 1937 by the Turkish Aeronautical Association. It is one of the two parachute towers in the country.

== History ==
Mayor Behçet Uz, who saw the parachute tower in Gorky Park in Moscow, suggested that a similar tower be built in Kültürpark to the Turkish Aeronautical Association. The Turkish Aeronautical Association sent a delegation to Russia to investigate and decided to build a parachute tower in Ankara in addition to İzmir. The construction of the tower, whose architectural project was prepared by Bedri Tümay and Algrandi, started in 1935 within Kültürpark. The tower, which costed 38,758.61 Turkish liras, was completed in 1937. It was inaugurated on 20 August along with the 7th İzmir International Fair with the participation of the then-Economy Minister Celâl Bayar. The tower operated for a fee during the fair period. It was temporarily closed due to damage in the 2020 Aegean Sea earthquake.

== Architecture ==
Seventy-five oak piles were nailed to the floor of the İzmir Parachute Tower, which was built using reinforced concrete as the first concrete parachute tower in the world. The tower, which has three terraces, is 4.5 metres (15 ft) above sea level and 48 metres (157 ft) above ground level. There is an elevator in the middle of the tower and a 245-step spiral staircase around this elevator.
