= Dr. Behçet Uz Children's Hospital =

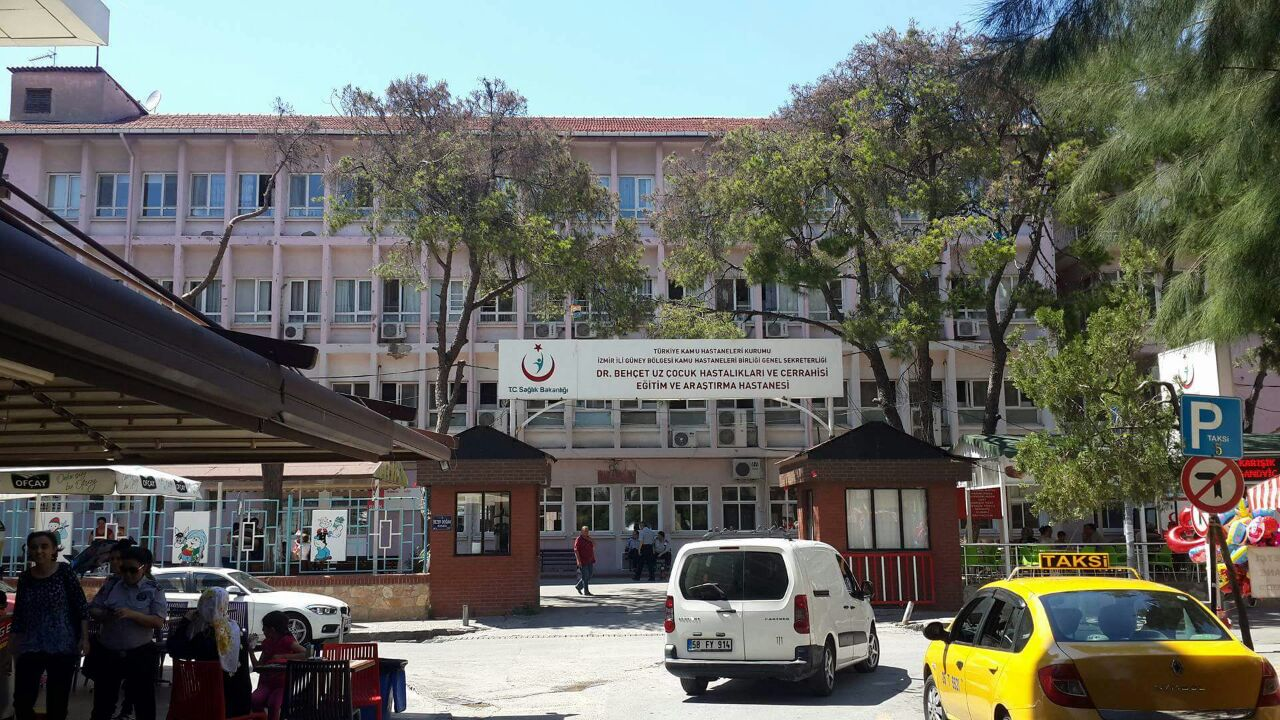

Geography
- Location: Cumhuriyet Square, İzmir, Turkey
- Coordinates: 38.427976431638385°N 27.139611504278076°E

Organisation
- Type: Specialist
- Affiliated university: University of Health Sciences, Izmir Medical School

Services
- Emergency department: yes
- Beds: 350
- Speciality: Children's hospital

Helipads
- Helipad: no

History
- Opened: 2 April 1947

Links
- Website: behcetuzch.saglik.gov.tr
- Lists: Hospitals in Turkey

Dr. Behçet Uz Children's Hospital (Turkish: Behçet Uz Çocuk Hastalıkları Hastanesi), officially Dr. Behçet Uz Pediatric Diseases and Surgery Training and Research Hospital (Turkish: Dr. Behçet Uz Çocuk Hastalıkları ve Cerrahisi Eğitim ve Araştırma Hastanesi), is a children's hospital in İzmir, Turkey. The hospital was built in April 1947. The building was built in the Modernist architecture style as it was part of a city planning and architecture project in the 1920s. It was designed and built by Zeki Sayar and continues to function as a children's hospital. The structure is well-preserved and has not changed significantly since its creation. Hikmet Gökmen restored the building and reorganized and updated the surrounding environment to fit modern needs.

== History ==
The hospital's groundbreaking ceremony was held on 23 April 1938 by Dr. Behçet Uz, the mayor of Izmir at the time. Dr. Uz had collected around 30,000 Turkish lira from the governorate, municipality and public donations. The estimated cost of construction was 900,000 Turkish lira. On 21 October 1946, the hospital was transferred to the Ministry of Health by the municipality. Dr. Uz had convinced the municipality for the transfer, as he was the then-Minister of Health. The hospital opened on 2 April 1947, with Dr. Uz and Recep Peker, the prime minister, present in the ceremony.

The hospital served as a cornerstone for the foundation of Ege University and its medical school. Today the hospital is affiliated with the University of Health Sciences Izmir Medical School.

== Location ==
The building is located near Cumhuriyet Square. The area around the hospital was rebuilt with wide boulevards after the fire of Smyrna.

== Architecture ==
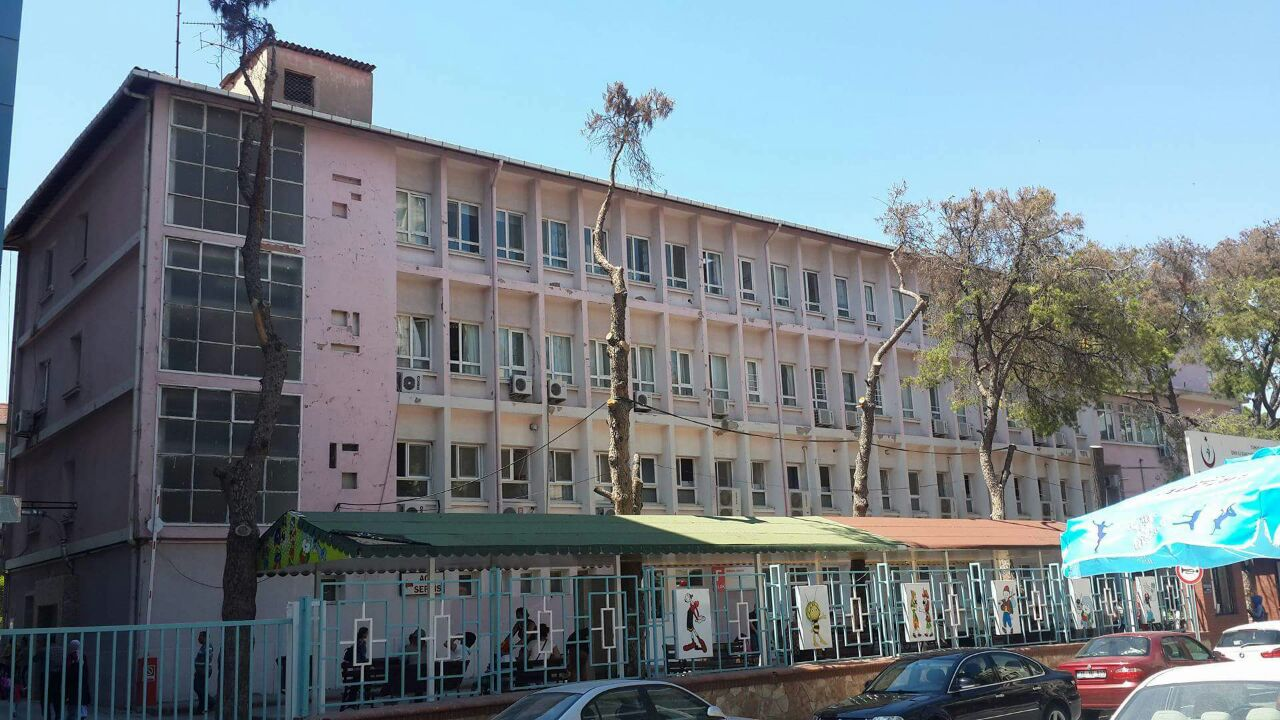

The hospital is built out of 4 story blocks which join together in a rectangular leaving an atrium in the center. The 19th-century architectural approach aimed to utilize sunlight. The same rectangular geometric form repeats itself in openings on the exterior facade following modern aspects in architecture. Up until the 1920s Turkish architecture used traditional features as a way of being more nationalist, but transitioned to more modern architectural styles in the 30s. This hospital and the Gazi Primary School are good examples of the modern architectural style.

Another difference from other hospitals is a rectangular oriented block and their corridors have rooms both sides. It is also possible to observe these types of corridors in Gazi School in Alsancak. The school was also part of that modern aspect of architecture.

The hospital is an example of the use of supporting walls in construction. As a result of the supporting walls, it has large regular rectangular windows that allow for much natural light and need little artificial lighting. However, the corridors still need artificial lighting.

The roof structure is red tile patterned with an angle and similar characteristics to the surrounding public buildings to catch the harmony of them. The building is painted pink. The color decision is more relevant to the function of the structure instead of the design or composition.
