= Saint Voukolos Church =

Church building in İzmir, Turkey

- Ιερός Ναός Αγίου Βουκόλου Σμύρνης; Aziz Vukolos Kilisesi
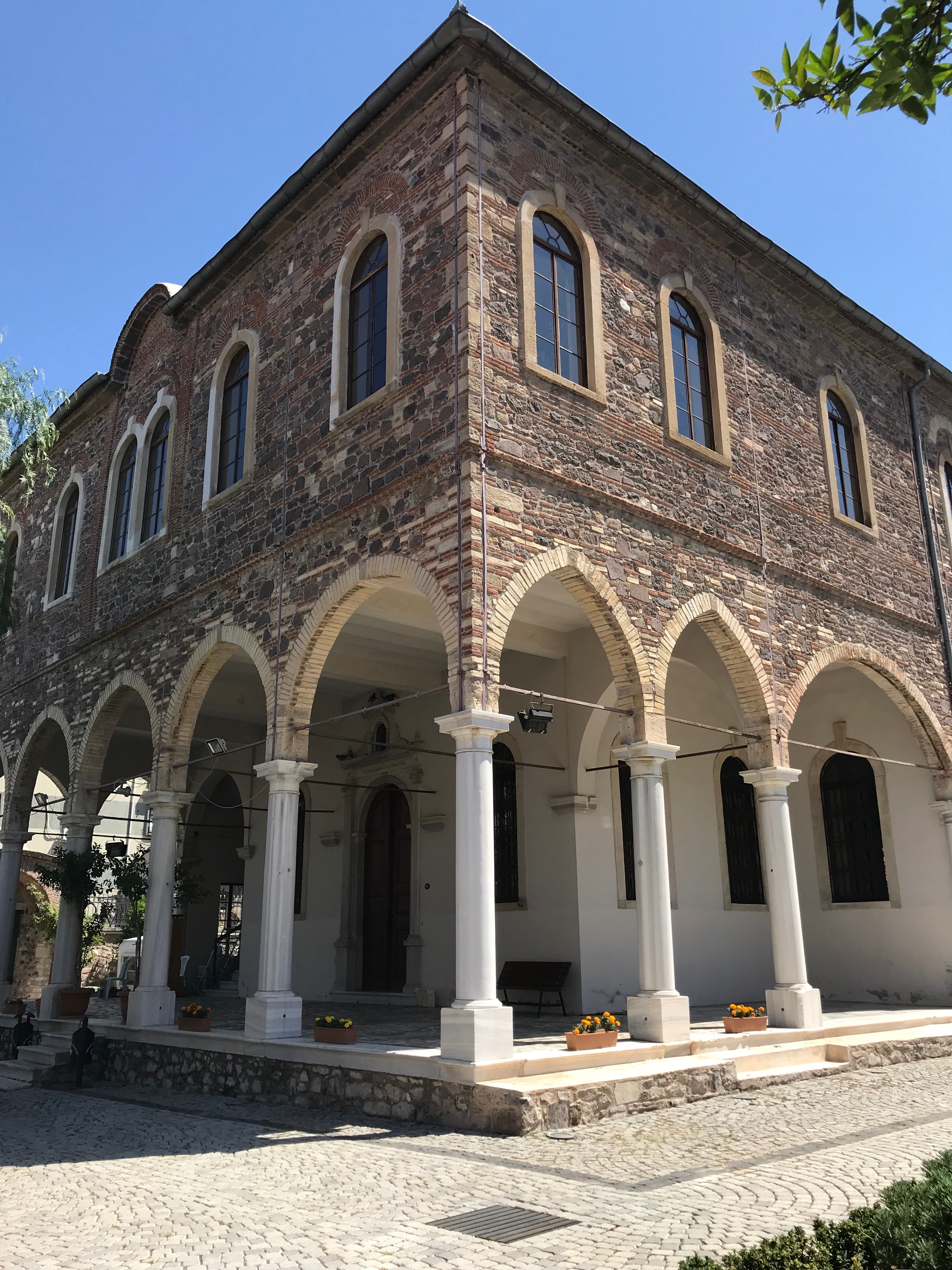

Religion
- Affiliation: Greek Orthodox Church
- Patron: Voukolos

Location
- Location: Konak, İzmir, Turkey
- Interactive map of Saint Voukolos Church
- Coordinates: 38°25′17.3″N 27°08′51.6″E

Architecture
- Completed: 1887
- Materials: Stone; brick

Saint Voukolos Church (Turkish: Aziz Vukolos Kilisesi, Greek: Ιερός Ναός Αγίου Βουκόλου Σμύρνης) is a Greek Orthodox church built by ethnic ethnic Armenians in İzmir, Turkey. Its patron saint is Voukolos, the first Bishop of Smyrna.

== History ==
Saint Voukolos Church, which started to be built in 1886 by the Armenians of the Greek Orthodox faith, was opened to worship in 1887. It was the only structure of Armenians that was not damaged by the great fire of Smyrna in 1922. As a result of the population exchange between Greece and Turkey, the church community left İzmir in the following year.

In February 1924, at the request of Mustafa Kemal Atatürk, the church building started to host the İzmir Archaeological Museum. During this period, the frescoes in the church were covered. In 1951, with the relocation of the museum to Kültürpark, the church building started to function as an opera study hall and a warehouse. In 1975, it was registered as a "cultural asset to be protected". It was severely damaged in a fire in 1990. In 2003, it was given to the use of İzmir Metropolitan Municipality. In December 2008, restoration work started at the church. After the restoration work was completed in 2010, the church building began to be used for cultural events; two of the four additions of the church were opened as the İzmir Journalists' Association Press Museum, and Hanife Çetiner and Esin Yılmaz Memorial House. On 17 August 2014, for the first time since 1922, a ritual was held at the church for the Assumption of Mary. The church also hosted various rites in 2015, 2016, and 2018.

== Architecture ==
Built using stone and brick, the church has one nave, one apse, and one transept.
