= Ankara Parachute Tower =

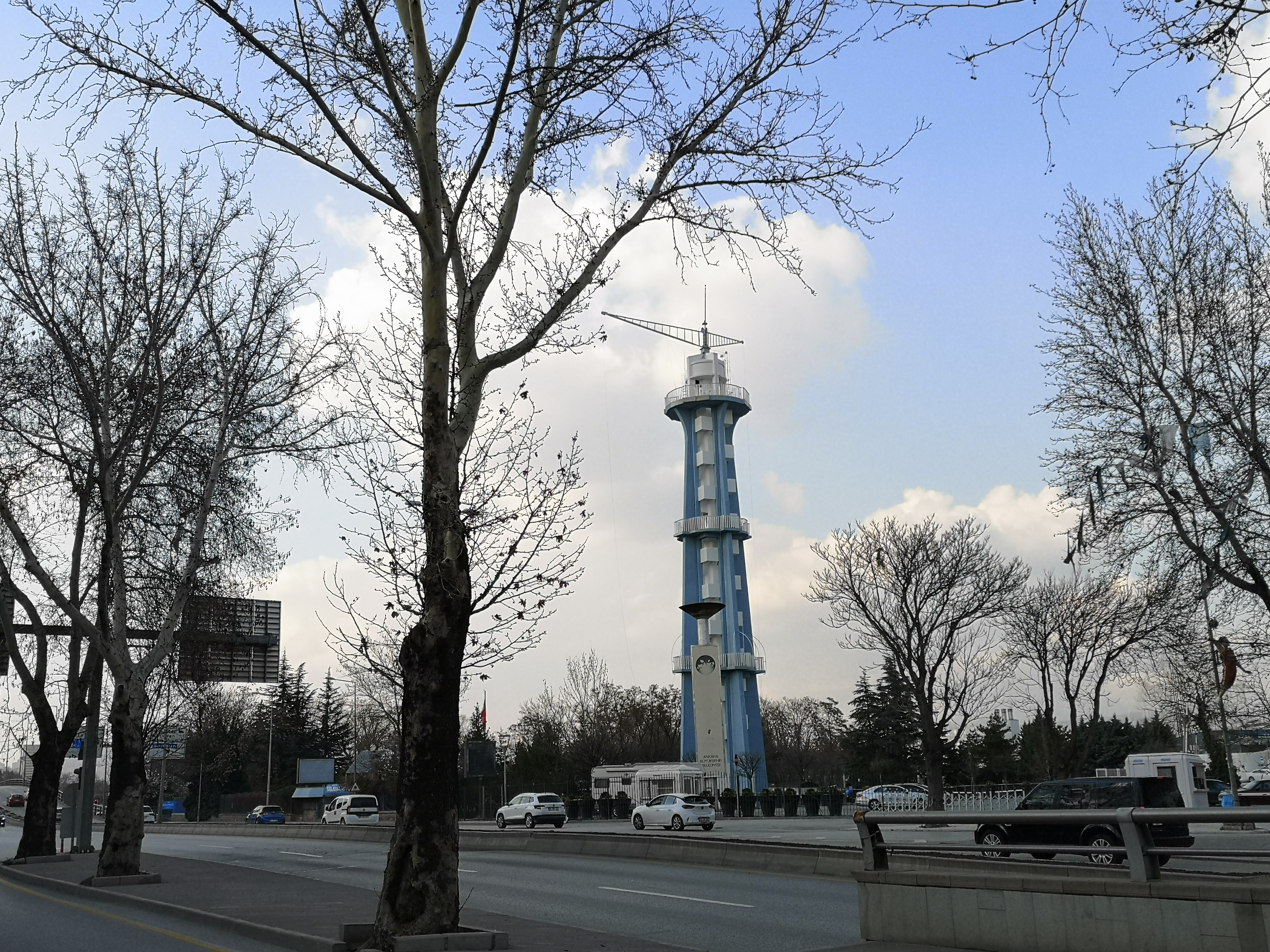
- Ankara Parachute Tower in 2023
- Interactive map of the Ankara Parachute Tower area
- Former names: Turkishbird Parachute Tower

General information
- Status: Completed
- Type: Parachute tower
- Location: Altındağ, Ankara, Turkey
- Current tenants: Turkish Aeronautical Association Museum
- Construction started: 1935
- Completed: 1937
- Opened: 28 October 1937
- Owner: Turkish Aeronautical Association

Height
- Height: 41

Technical details
- Material: Reinforced concrete
- Floor count: 4
- Lifts/elevators: 1

Design and construction
- Architect: Bedri Tümay

The Ankara Parachute Tower is a parachute tower located in the Altındağ district of Ankara, Turkey. It is built in the northwest of the former 19 May Stadium. It is one of the two towers serving in Turkey, along with the İzmir Parachute Tower. Currently, it is affiliated with the Turkish Aeronautical Association Museum.

== History ==
The idea of constructing a parachute tower in Ankara first emerged when the then-mayor of İzmir, Behçet Uz, admired the parachute tower in Gorky Park during a visit to the Soviet Union and prepared a report suggesting the construction of a similar structure in Turkey. The significant attention given to the aviation sector in the early years of the Republic accelerated the realization of this idea. Initially planned to have a parachute tower in the three largest cities of the country, namely Istanbul, Ankara, and İzmir, the project in Istanbul was canceled due to high costs.

The construction of the Ankara Parachute Tower, along with its counterpart in İzmir, was completed simultaneously in 1937. The opening ceremony took place on October 28, 1937, with the participation of the then-Prime Minister Celâl Bayar. The tower underwent external facade restoration in 1982, and on April 4, 1989, it was registered and placed under protection by the Ankara Cultural and Natural Heritage Preservation Regional Board with decision number 759.

== Architecture ==
The tower, designed by architect Bedri Tümay, is 4 stories high and 41 meters tall. It is designed with a total of 3 balconies, each with a jump platform. Connectivity between floors is provided by stairs and an elevator. At the top, there is a double-weight parachute release winch.
