= Alsancak =

- Neighbourhood
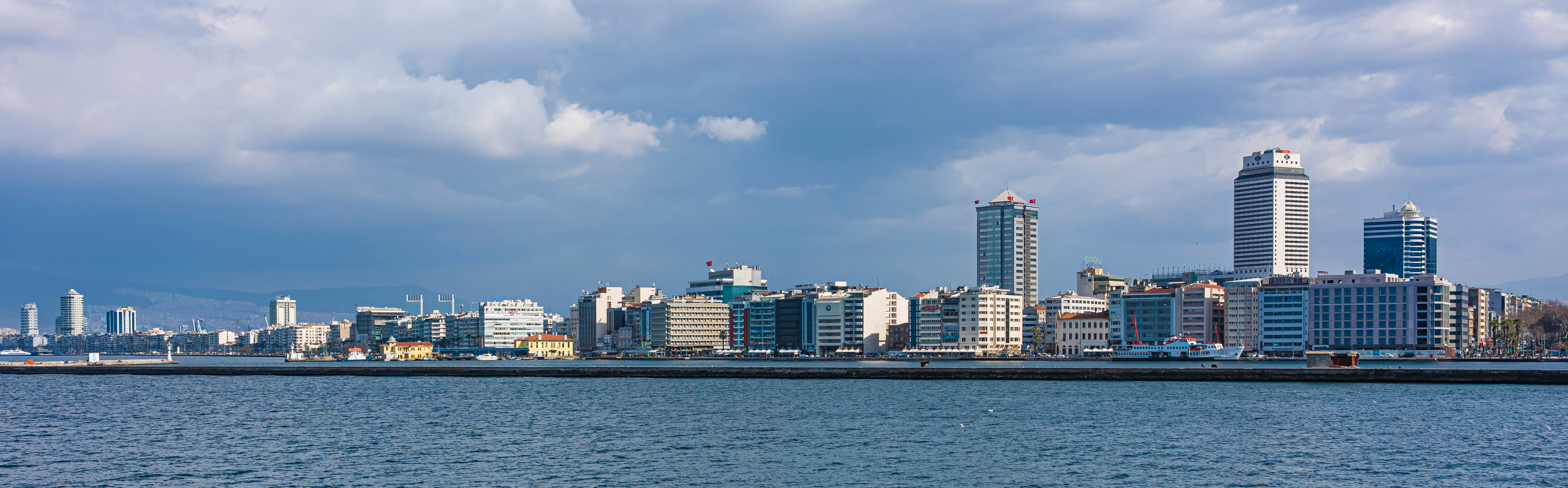
- A panoramic view of the Alsancak quarter

- Location within Turkey Location within İzmir
- Coordinates: 38°26′16″N 27°08′37″E
- Country: Turkey
- Province: İzmir
- District: Konak
- Population (2022): 5,581
- Time zone: UTC+3 (TRT)
- Postal code: 35220
- Area code: 0232

Alsancak is a neighbourhood in the municipality and district of Konak, İzmir Province, Turkey. Its population is 5,581 (2022). It is part of the historic center of the city of İzmir.

== Overview ==
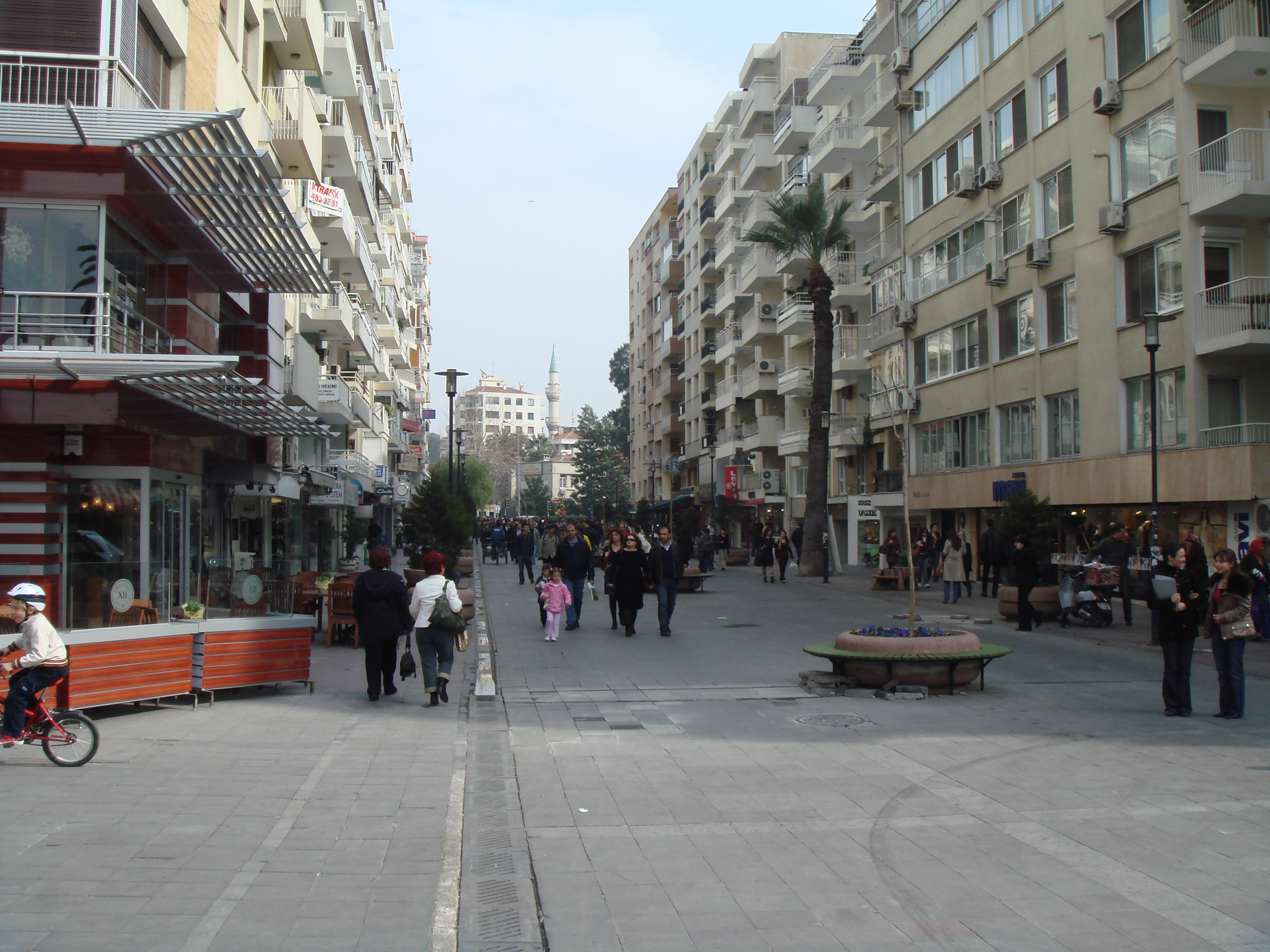
Ali Çetinkaya Avenue, one of the main streets of Alsancak.

As a notional zone, Alsancak extends from along the tip of the southern shores of the Gulf of İzmir, starting near İzmir's historic square that carries the same name as the district (Konak Square) with the 19th century-built Pasaport Quay marking the point, and extending along a 3200-meter-long seaside street and promenade called "Kordon" (esplanade, or more specifically as Birinci Kordon, Turkish: Birinci Kordon) and to join the neighboring metropolitan district of Bornova, located eastwards and at the very end of the Gulf's waters.

Within this larger notional zone of Alsancak, aside from the officially instituted and delimited quarter (mahalle) of Alsancak proper, the five neighbouring quarters of Umurbey, Kültür, Mimar Sinan, İsmet Kaptan and Akdeniz are found along the shore, and the whole is generally referred to as being part of the same complex.

In Ottoman times, the area was named "La Punta" (an Italian word meaning "the cape"; the name cited as La Pointe in French sources or in sources that borrow from them) and was the part of the city where the upper middle class was concentrated.

== Physical aspects ==
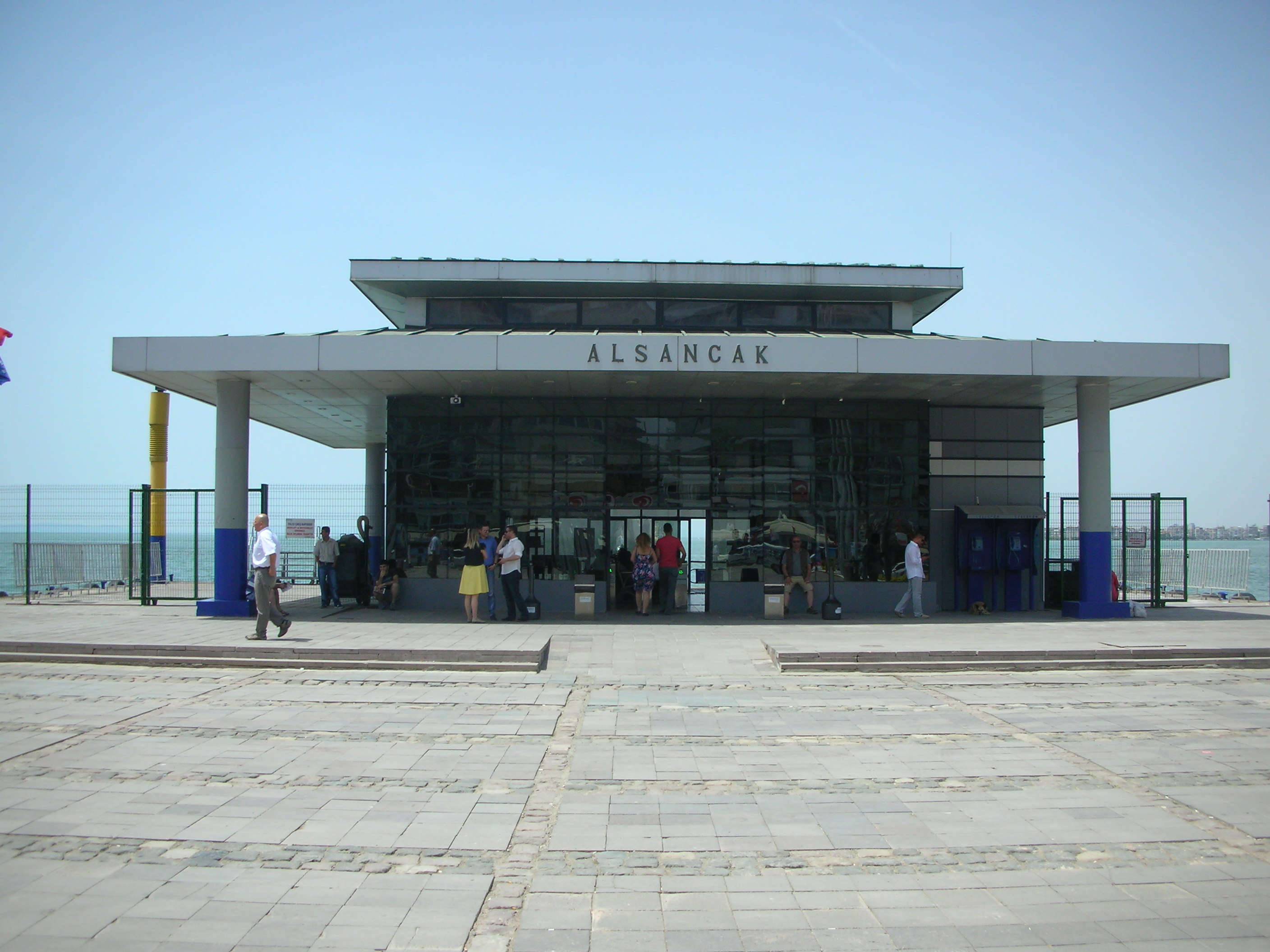
A view of Alsancak Pier in Kordon in 2015

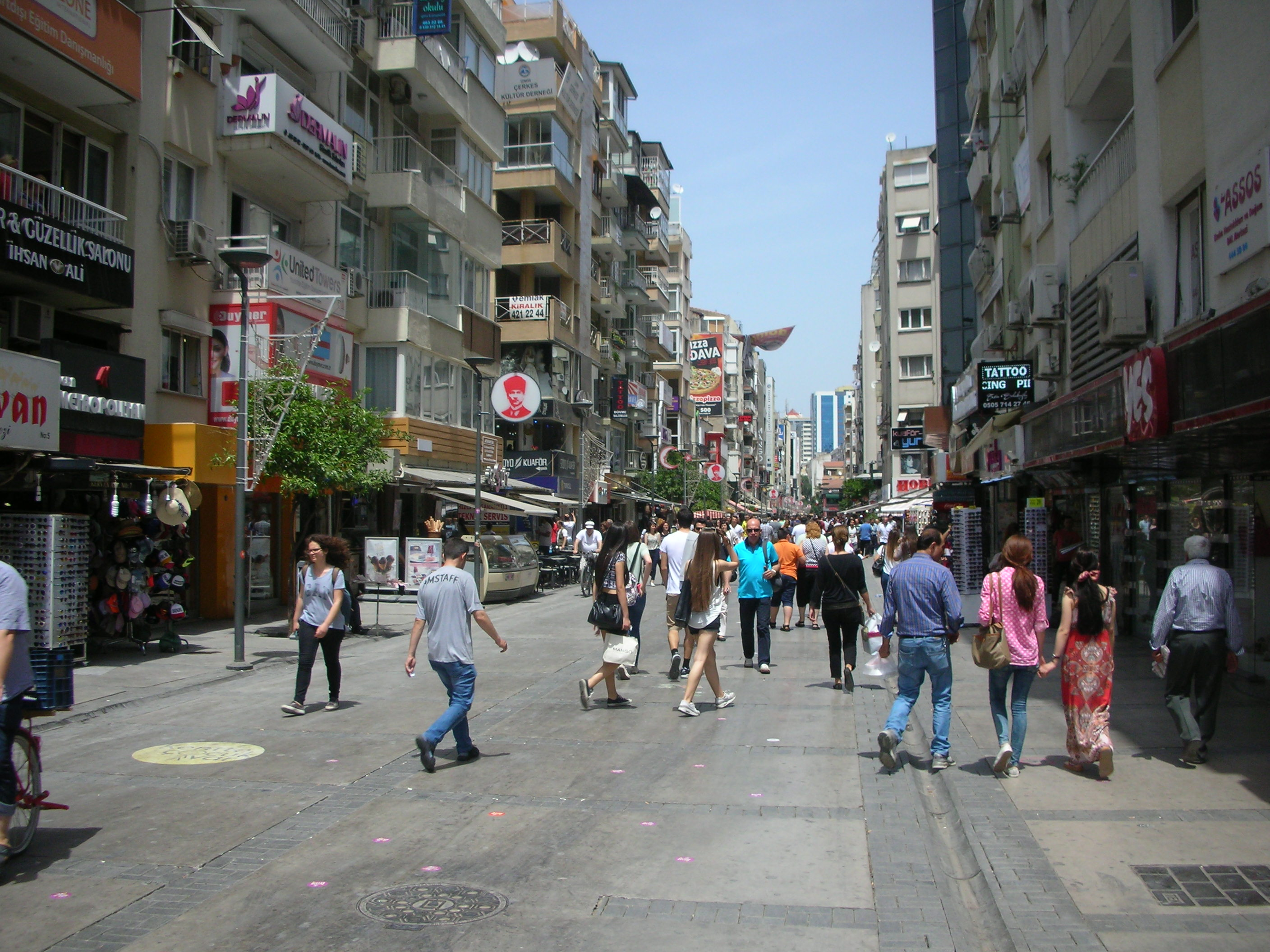
Kıbrıs Şehitleri Caddesi is the most popular street in Alsancak

Two large streets parallel to the coastline, named the First Kordon and the Second Kordon (Turkish: Birinci Kordon and İkinci Kordon), constitute the main arterial roads of the quarter. A level area situated in an alluvial plain, with well-designed streets, modern apartment blocks and stores, the city's trendiest and the most expensive and exclusive residences and commercial space are found here, as well as the busiest office buildings, including consulates.

Two major hotels in partnership with international brand names of the industry, Swissôtel and Hilton, are located towards the Konak end of the area, just behind the Square of the Republic (Turkish: Cumhuriyet Meydanı) distinguishable by the wide space with which it marks a point along the length of the esplanade and an equestrian statue of Atatürk, to whose honor a museum in the premises of a former mansion is also present towards the eastern end of Alsancak.

The Atatürk Museum building, which is a survivor of the transformation in recent decades of coastline residences from terraced double-storey houses to apartment blocks, also offers visitors a chance to have a glimpse of how the lives of the wealthy in 19th century İzmir was like.

Many restaurants, bars, cafes, discothèques and other entertainment venues are concentrated in Alsancak, increasingly within the intact rows of older and more traditional one- or two-storied buildings found in the inner smaller streets and are often restored specifically for the purpose of the intended commercial activity. Kültürpark, the distinct location of the İzmir International Fair, is also englobed by the area of the quarter of Alsancak in both administrative and practical terms.

The newest and most attended synagogue of İzmir, "Shar Hashamayim" is also in Alsancak where increasing numbers of the city's remaining Jews opt to live, moving in from their traditional neighborhood of Karataş.

The Port of İzmir, İzmir Alsancak Stadium and Alsancak Railway Station are also located in Alsancak.

== Alsancak Railway Station and Quay ==
The Alsancak Railway Station (Turkish: Alsancak Tren Garı) is the oldest railway station in Turkey, built by the "Oriental Railway Company" (ORC) incorporated in 1856, to build a railway line from İzmir to Aydın. The main building of the station was completed in 1858 and the line to Aydin was opened in 1866. In 2001 the station was expanded from 4 tracks and 2 platforms, to 10 tracks and 6 platforms. In 2006 the station was closed to passenger traffic due to the İzmir Metro expansion project. The station keeps on handling freight traffic and is connected to the harbor which has an entry just across the street.

One of the quays of İzmir's urban ferry services is also located in Alsancak, called under the same name, as Alsancak Quay Turkish: Alsancak İskelesi. Ferries here crisscross between Konak and Pasaport further to the west and the busy residential and shopping area of Karşıyaka at the opposite coast.

== See also ==
- Alsancak Hocazade Mosque
- Kemeraltı
