= Alsancak Hocazade Mosque =

Mosque in Alsancak, İzmir, Turkey

Coordinates: 38.4341°N 27.1446°E

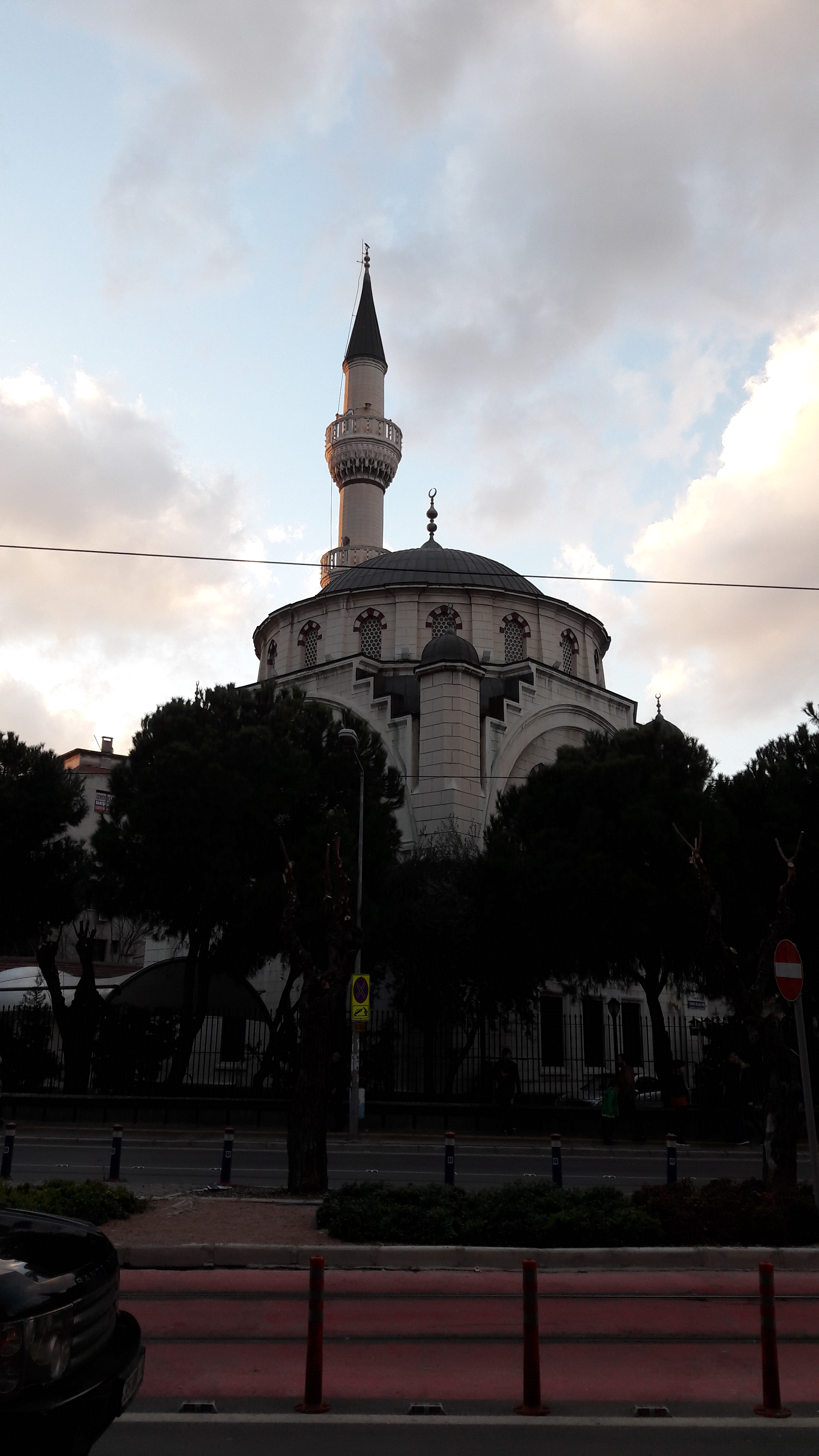

Religion
- Affiliation: Islam

Location
- Location: Alsancak, İzmir
- Country: Turkey
- Interactive map of Alsancak Hocazade Mosque

Architecture
- Architect: Fahri Nişli
- Type: mosque
- Established: 1948
- Completed: 1950

Alsancak Hocazade Mosque (Alsancak Hocazade Camii) is a Mosque in İzmir, Turkey.

It is found in the district of Alsancak on the intersection of Şair Eşref Bulvarı and Ali Çetinkaya Bulvarı. The classical Ottoman styled Mosque was built between 1948 and 1950 by efforts of the Hocazade Ahmet Ragıp Üzümcü Foundation. The building is mostly white, but the main and cascading domes are blue as are the double balconies of the minarets. The İzmir Municipality and the High Council for Historic Monuments carried out a restoration in 2002
