= Parachute Tower in Katowice =

Coordinates: 50°14′46.28″N 19°0′26.1″E

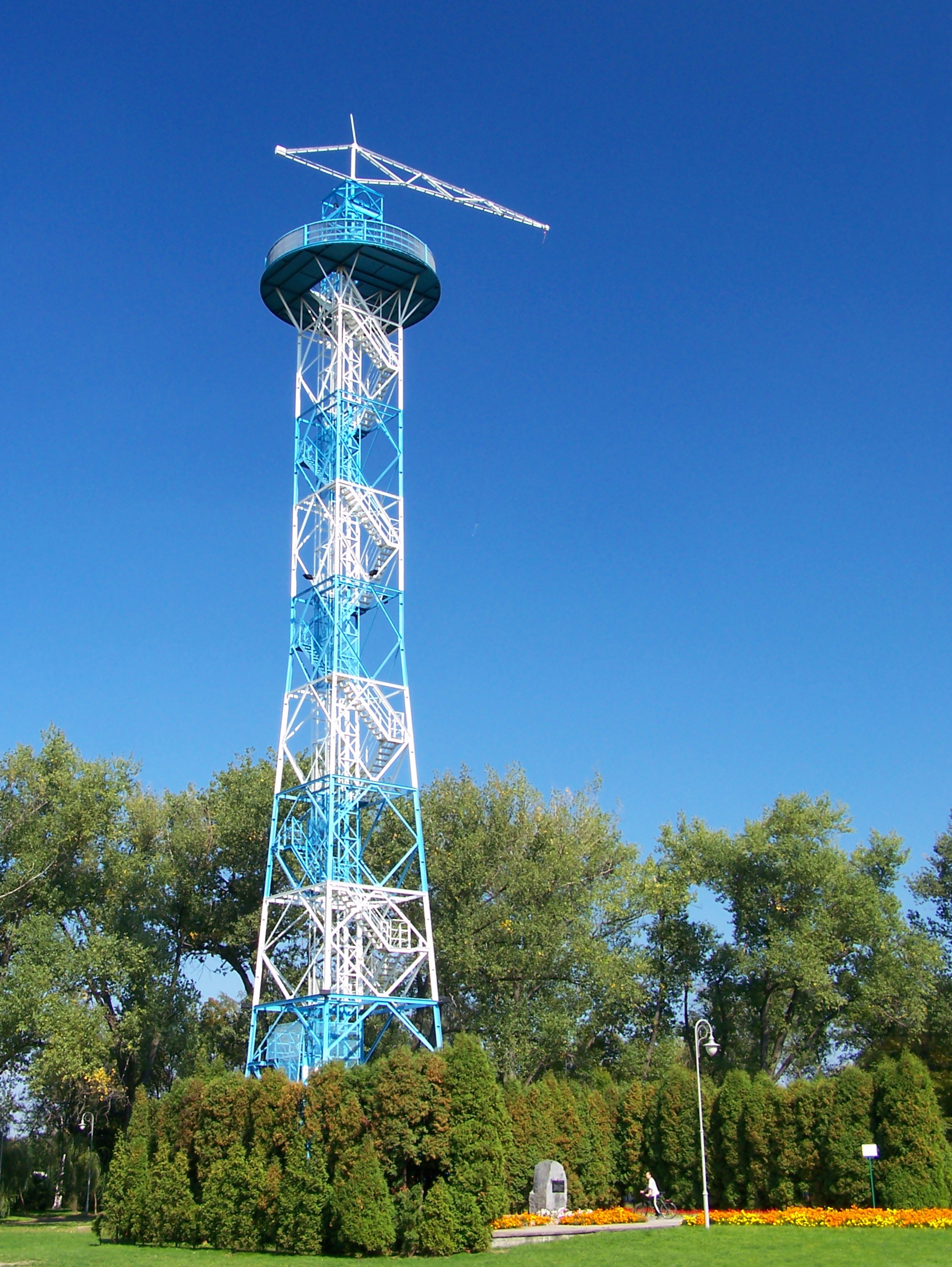
Parachute Tower in Katowice

Parachute Tower in Katowice (Polish: Wieża spadochronowa w Katowicach) is a 35-metre tall lattice parachute tower built in 1937 for training parachute jumps. It was used in the first days of World War II by Germany's 73rd Infantry Division as an observation tower.

The tower is the only existing parachute tower in Poland.

== Defence of the tower on 4 September 1939 ==
During the first days of the German invasion of Poland, on 4 September, several Polish Boy and Girl Scouts shot German troops from it; most were killed, with at least 10 fatalities. This incident is the best remembered part of the defence of Katowice by irregular Polish units, which has been described as "legendary". Older accounts suggested that the tower was defended for many hours, while newer research suggest that the incident was much shorter. When research debunking the older version was first published, it was described as controversial and led to a number of protests.
