= Parachute tower =

Tower used for parachute training

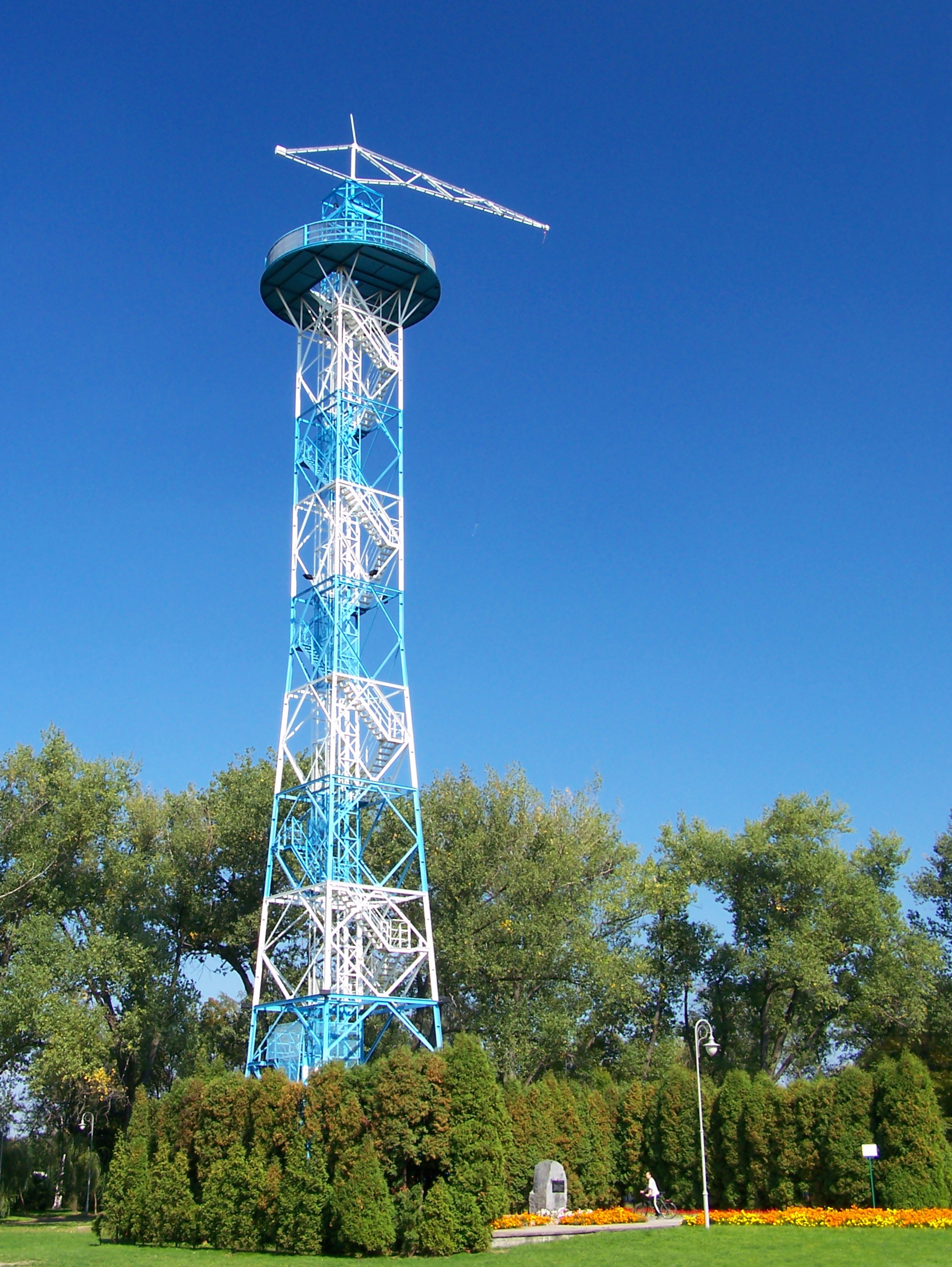
Parachute Tower Katowice in Poland

A parachute tower is a tower used for parachute training, often by members of a military paratroop unit. A mixture of tower heights are used at different stages of training. Trainees typically begin on towers around 35 feet (11 m) in height in fall-arrest harnesses before progressing onto parachute descents from towers that can be in excess of 250 feet (76 m). The use of towers allows trainees to practice their landing technique before jumping from an aircraft.

== Use ==
Parachute towers are used to train people, particularly military paratroopers, in parachute jump technique. Towers are typically divided into low towers of approximately 35 feet (11 m) and high towers of around 100–200 feet (30–61 m) or higher. The shorter towers are used by trainees jumping in harnesses with a fall-restraint cable to simulate the exit from an aircraft and safe landing technique.

Trainees then pass on to the high tower jumps with parachutes. The high tower typically has one or more arms at the top from which the trainee is winched up into the air and released to descend by parachute. The parachutes used are specific variants developed for training and were originally modified commercial systems, though the US military later developed the Type J-I parachute specifically for high tower jumps.

The high tower allows trainees to practice the "body landing" (or parachute landing fall) technique, which is essential to avoid injuries such as broken legs or ankles. The high tower can also be used to carry out "shock harness drills", intended to simulate the initial shock of a parachute canopy opening. The trainee is hauled up into the air and dropped to free fall approximately 15 feet (4.6 m) before being brought to a complete stop. After high tower training is passed troops proceed onto aircraft jumps from an altitude of approximately 1,250 feet (380 m). In the United States Army during the Second World War, five jumps from aircraft were sufficient to complete the course; the British Army required trainees to undertake an additional two jumps from tethered balloons prior to jumping from aircraft.

== Military history ==
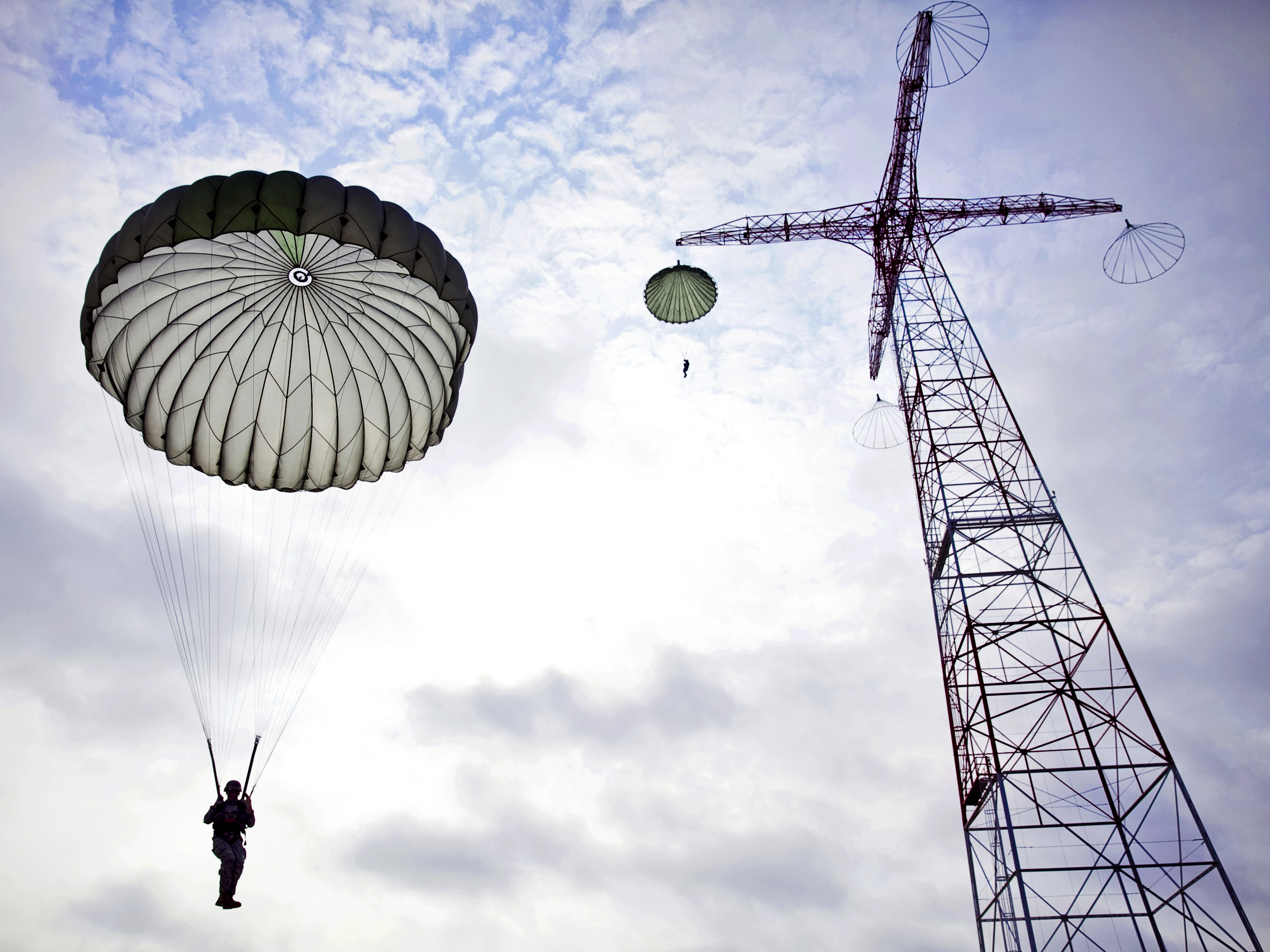
A parachute tower at Fort Benning in the United States

The first parachute tower in the United States was a 115-foot-tall (35 m) tower in Ocean County, New Jersey, built by Stanley Switlik and first used by Amelia Earhart on 2 June 1935. The 262-foot (80 m) Parachute Jump ride at the 1939 New York World's Fair (later moved to Coney Island) was a parachute tower, though the United States Army parachute training centre at Fort Benning had only 34-foot (10 m) towers until 1941. Major William Lee of the United States Army, in charge of the training of the first 48-man platoon of US paratroopers, saw the Parachute Jump ride and constructed a similar tower at Fort Benning. Three further towers were later erected. Each stood 254 feet (77 m) high and had four arms—each of which could hoist a single paratrooper—that spanned 134 feet (41 m).

The Polish Army used the Parachute Tower Katowice for training. The tower was used as a vantage point on 4 September 1939 during the defence of the town from the German invasion. The story of its defence by Polish boy and girl scouts has been described as a "heroic myth". Some of the Polish Army escaped to the United Kingdom after the fall of Poland and were based at Largo House, Scotland. Here they constructed a parachute tower, the first to be built in the British Empire, which was used to train the 1st Independent Parachute Brigade. The British military later constructed their own parachute tower (with capacity for two paratroopers) at RAF Ringway, which was moved to RAF Abingdon in 1950.

The USSR had a large number of parachute training towers, with 559 in operation by 1939. Japan had at least four in operation during the Second World War. The Turkish Aeronautical Association constructed two parachute towers in İzmir and Ankara between 1935 and 1937 based on a Russian tower in use at Gorky Park. Rhodesia also had a parachute tower at New Sarum Air Force Base.

== Fairground rides ==
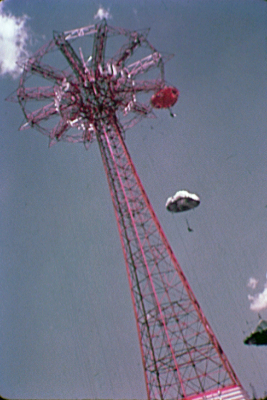
The Parachute Jump tower, in use at the 1939 New York World's Fair

As well as the original Parachute Jump at the 1939 World's Fair, there have been several other fairground rides based on a similar premise. The Pair-O-Chutes ride operated at Chicago's Riverview Park but was demolished in 1968. Parachute towers, known as "Parachute Drops" were developed by Intamin for the Six Flags theme parks. The Texas Chute Out operated at Six Flags Over Texas from 1976 to 2012; Great Gasp operated at Six Flags Over Georgia from 1976 to 2005 and Sky Chuter was at Six Flags Over Mid-America from 1978 to 1982. Sky Chuter was relocated to Six Flags Great Adventure, where it reopened in 1983 as Parachuter's Perch. It was renamed Parachute Training Center: Edwards AFB Jump Tower in 1996 and closed in 2023. Intamin also produced a "Parachute Drop" for Knott's Berry Farm in California in the late 1970s, which was named "Sky Jump". The parachute jump portion of the tower was removed but its observation tower remains in operation. Yomiuri’s amusement park in Tamagawa had a jump tower. Tokyo Dome City Attractions, Japan, has an Intamin parachute drop ride named Sky Flower.
