= İzmir Archaeological Museum =

Archeology museum in İzmir, Turkey

- İzmir Arkeoloji Müzesi
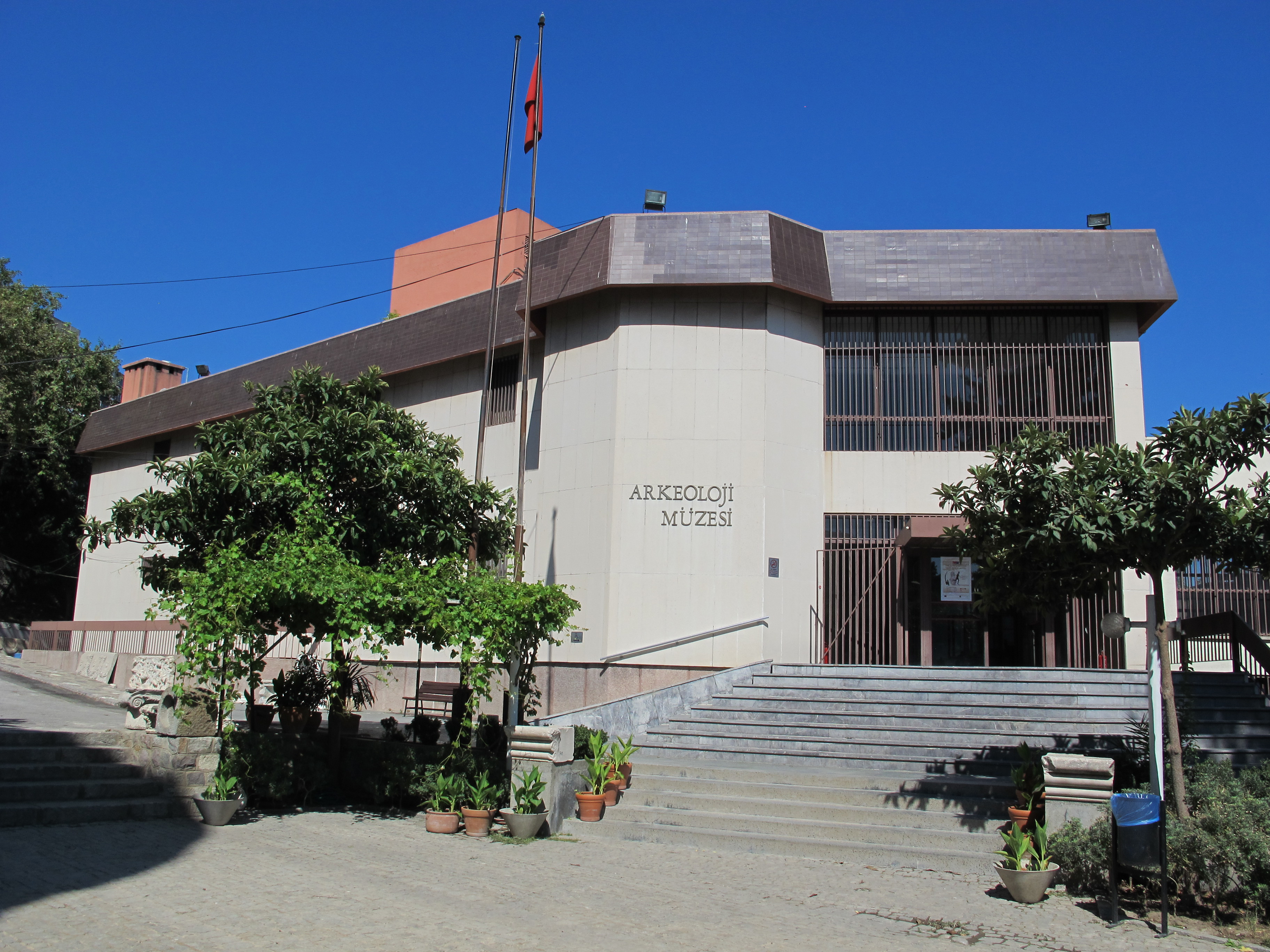

- Location within Turkey
- Established: 1927
- Location: İzmir, Turkey
- Coordinates: 38°24′50″N 27°07′41″E
- Type: Archaeology
- Website: www.izmirmuzesi.gov.tr/defaultEN.aspx

The Izmir Archaeological Museum (Turkish: İzmir Arkeoloji Müzesi) is an archeology museum in İzmir, Turkey, containing a number of artifacts from around the Gulf of İzmir. Most of the artifacts, which include busts, statues, statuettes, tools, and various eating and cooking utensils, come from the Bronze Age, or from the Greek and Roman periods.

== History ==
The museum was established in 1924. It was built on the site of an abandoned church, called Saint Voukolos Church. The museum opened to the public in 1927.

The archaeology museum was later moved to the National Education Pavilion in the Culture Park, which in turn was converted into a museum in 1951. But archaeological work in İzmir, Smyrna, and the neighboring ancient cities necessitated a larger museum. A new museum was subsequently established in 1984. The museum has exhibits from ancient sites like Bayraklı (ancient Smyrna), Ephesus, Pergamon, Miletus, Aphrodisias, Clazomenae, Teos, and Iasos. Two gardens, one in the front and one in the back, portray the history of western Anatolia.

The İzmir Archaeological Museum is one of the first built in Western Anatolia and contains a collection of artifacts of the Aegean Region. The museum's collection has been categorized as a regional museum rather than a local one because of the importance of its collection.

The Museum is located in Konak, in the central part of the city. It is within walking distance of Konak Square.

== Gallery ==
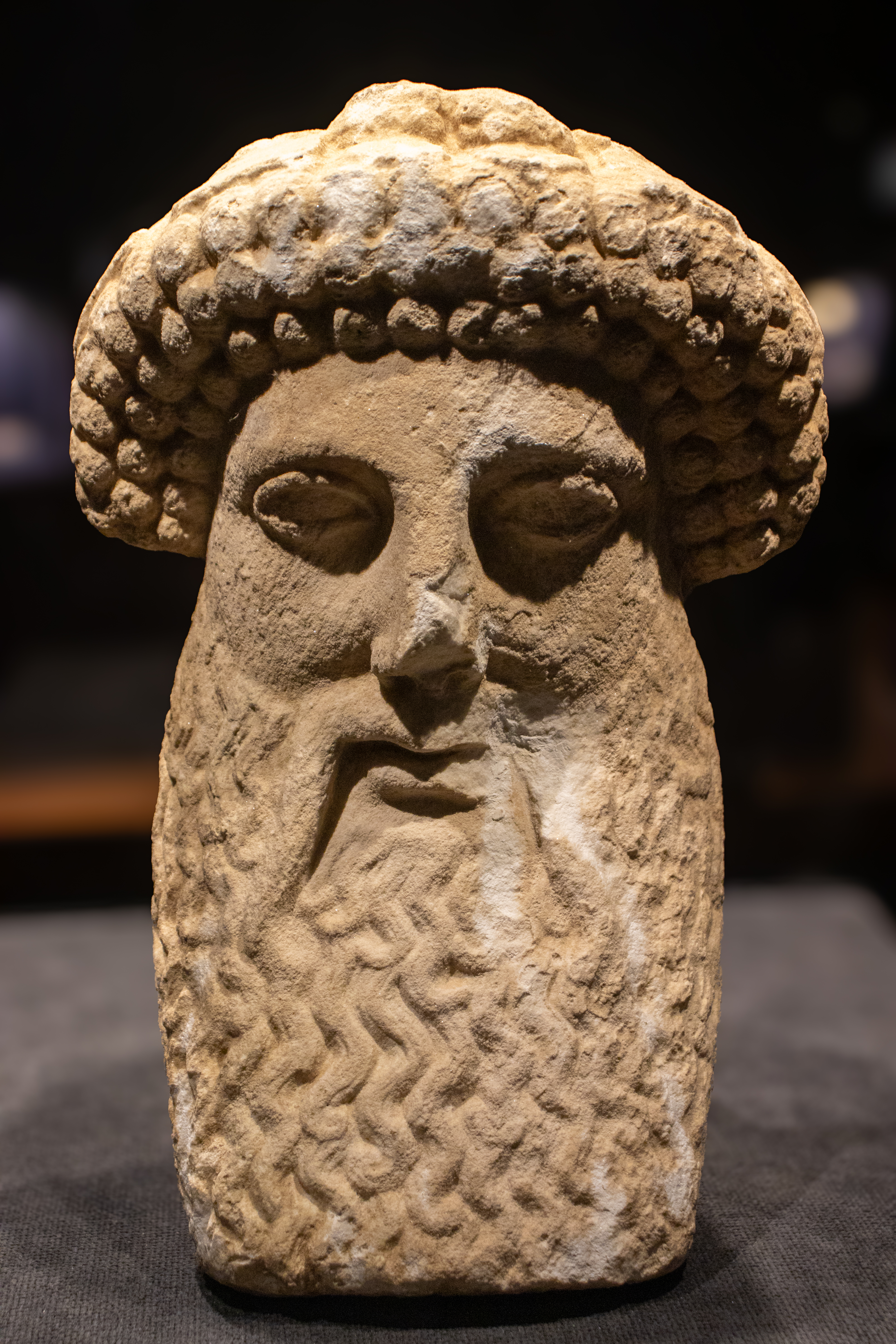
Marble herme head of Hermes, Roman period, exhibited at the İzmir Archaeological Museum

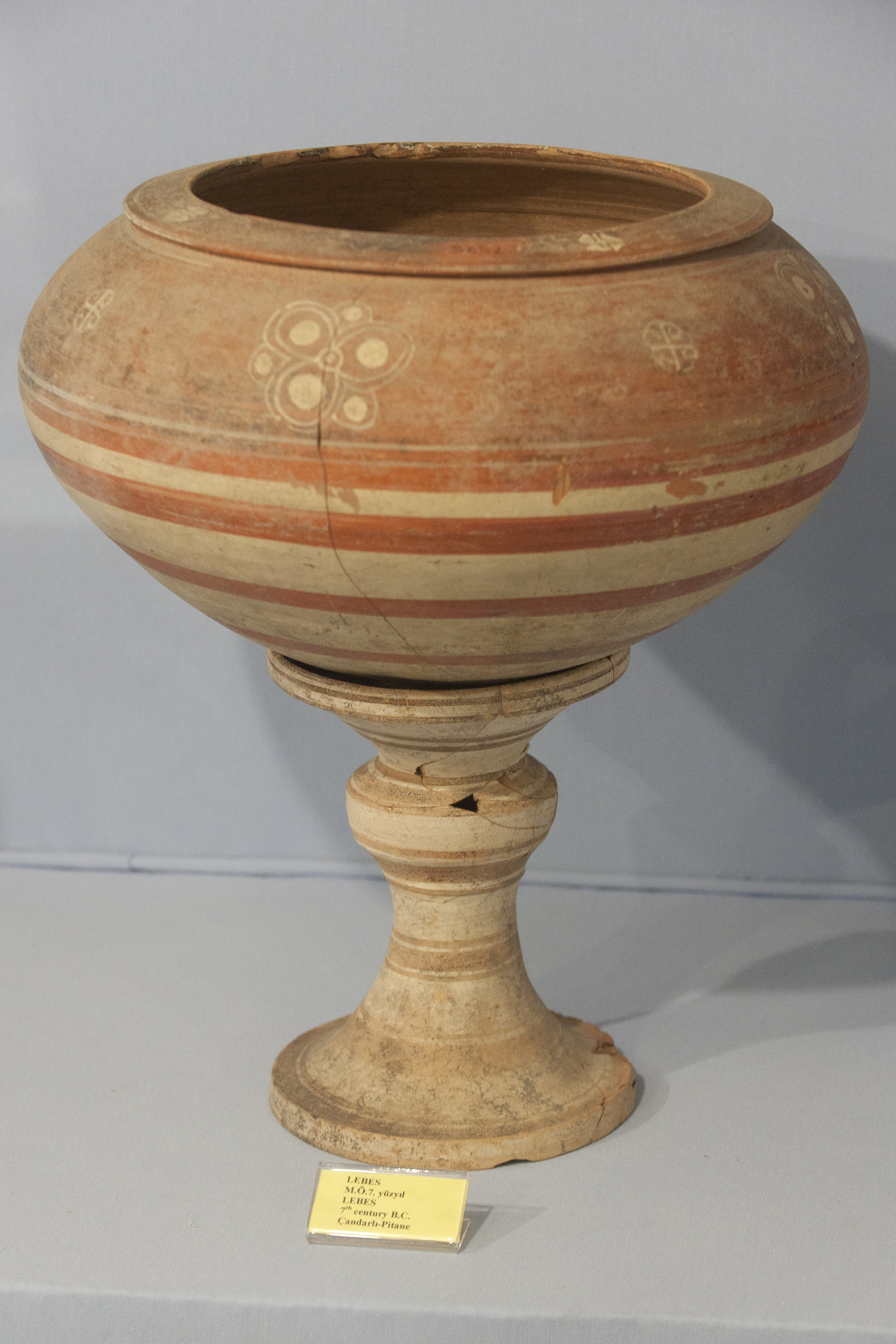
Lebes

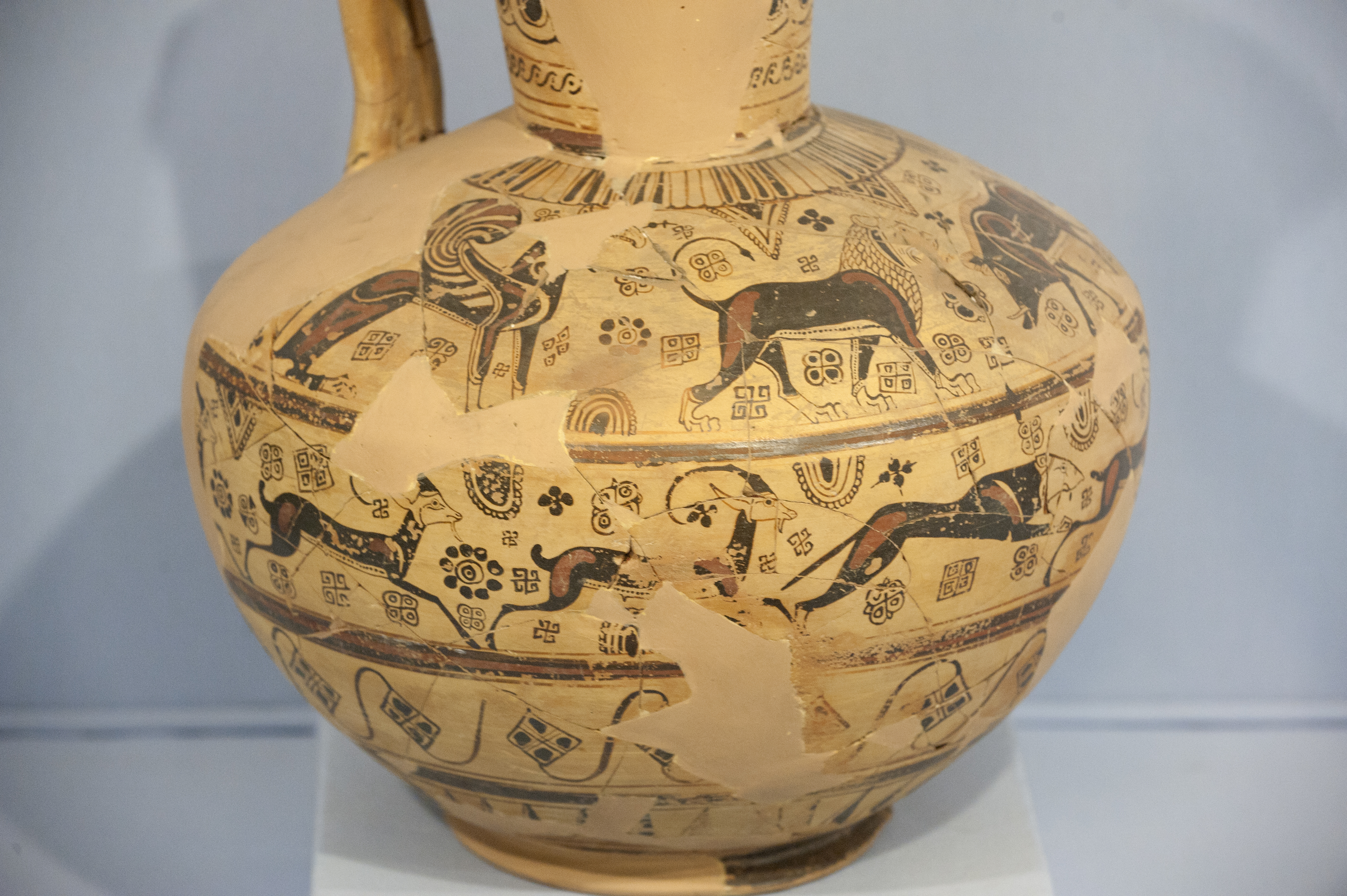
Oinochoe

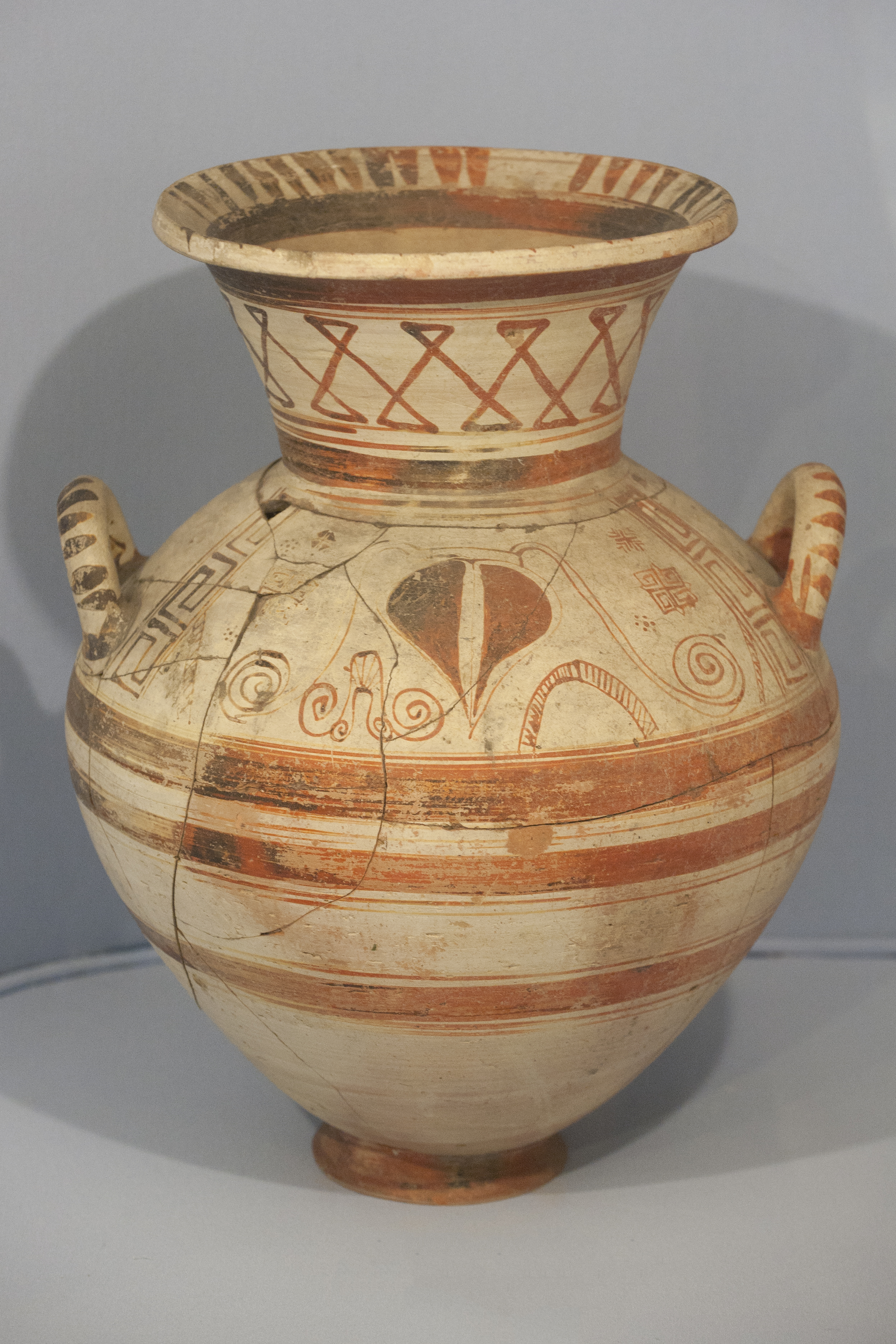
Vessel

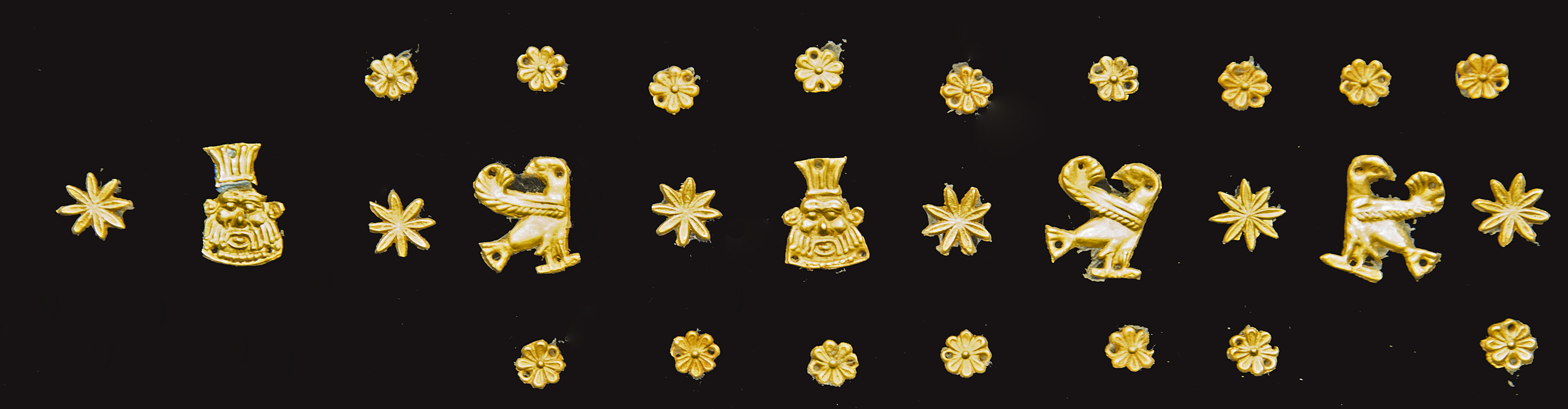
Appliques

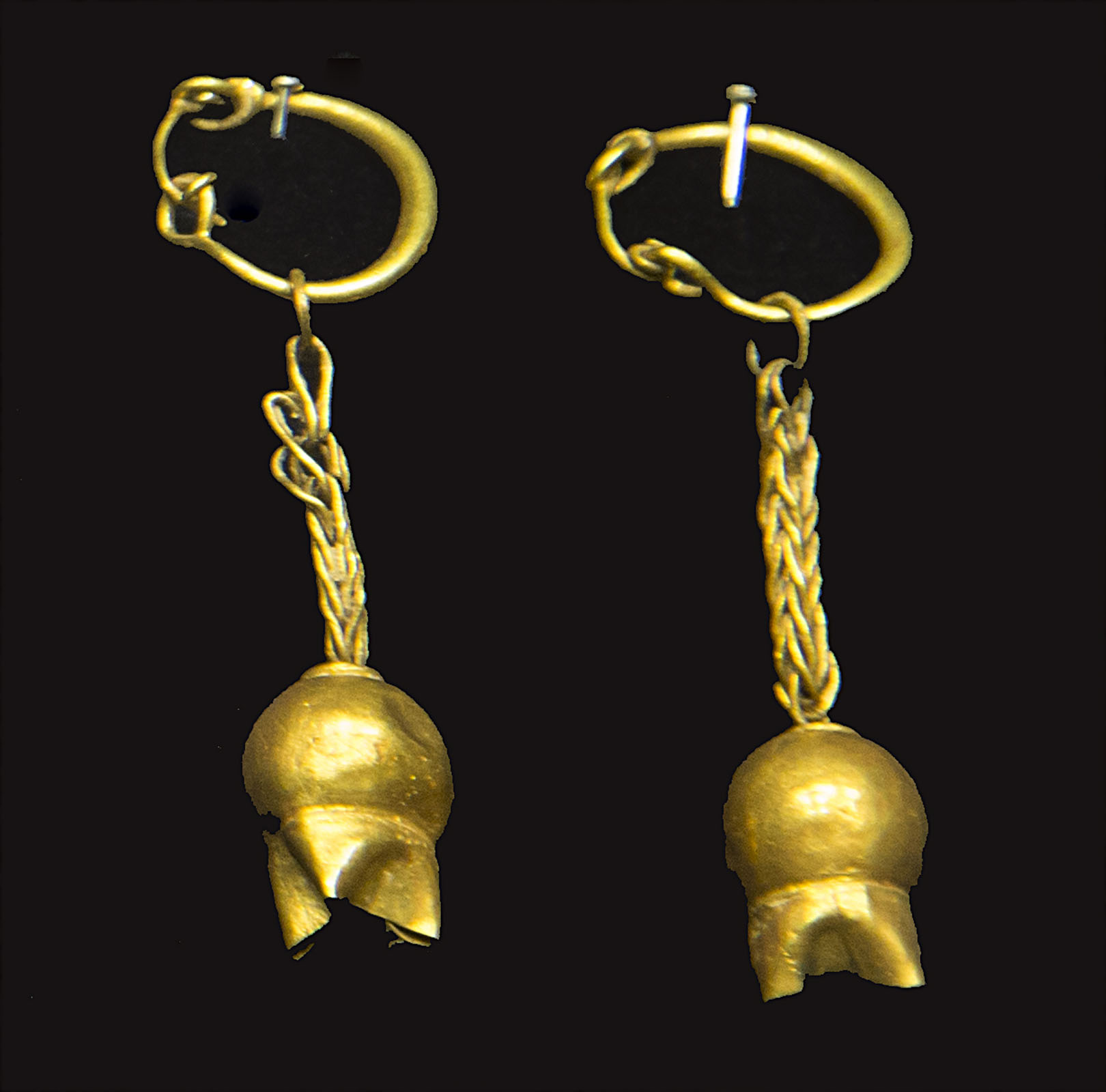
Earrings

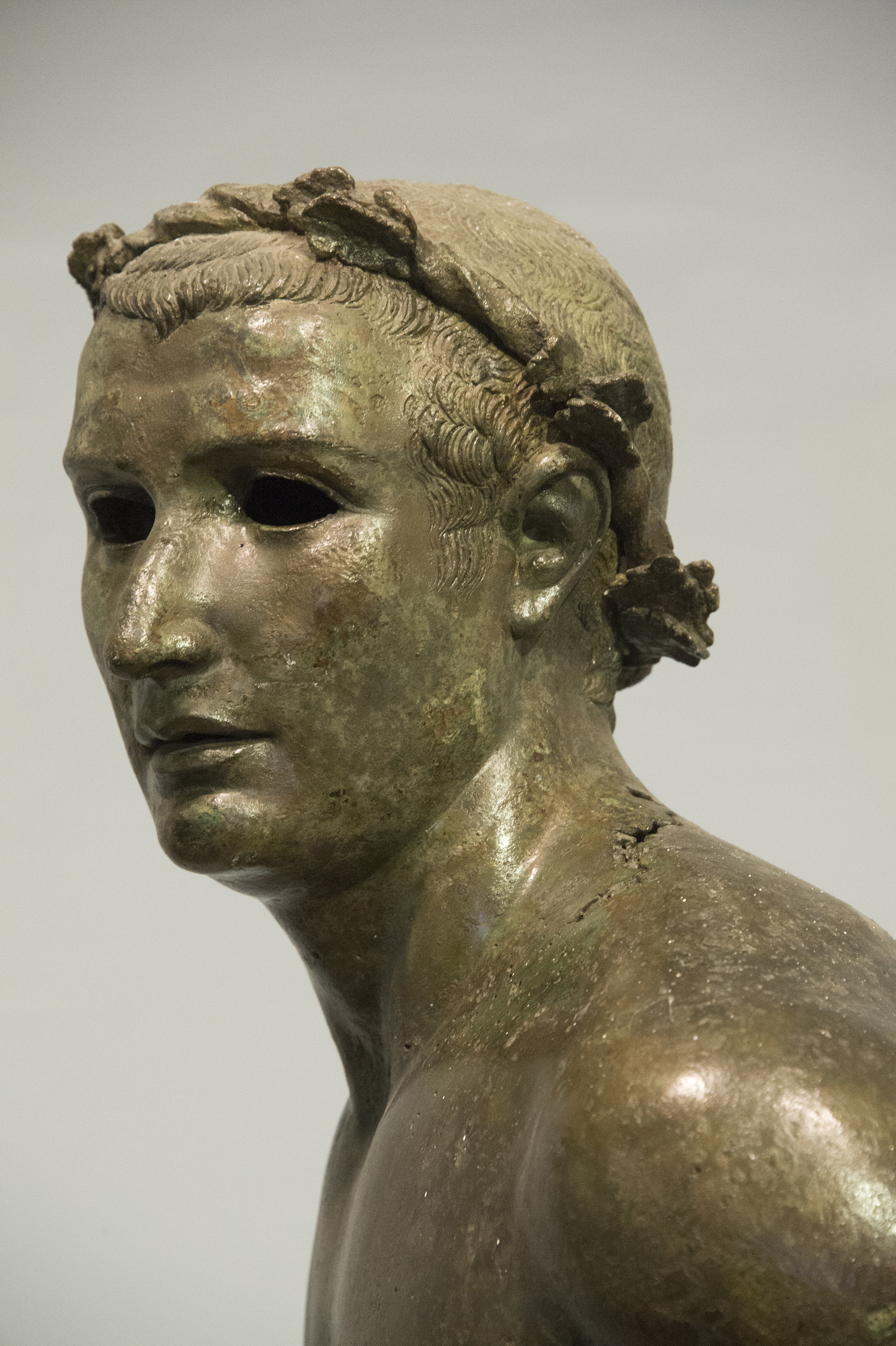
Athlete detail

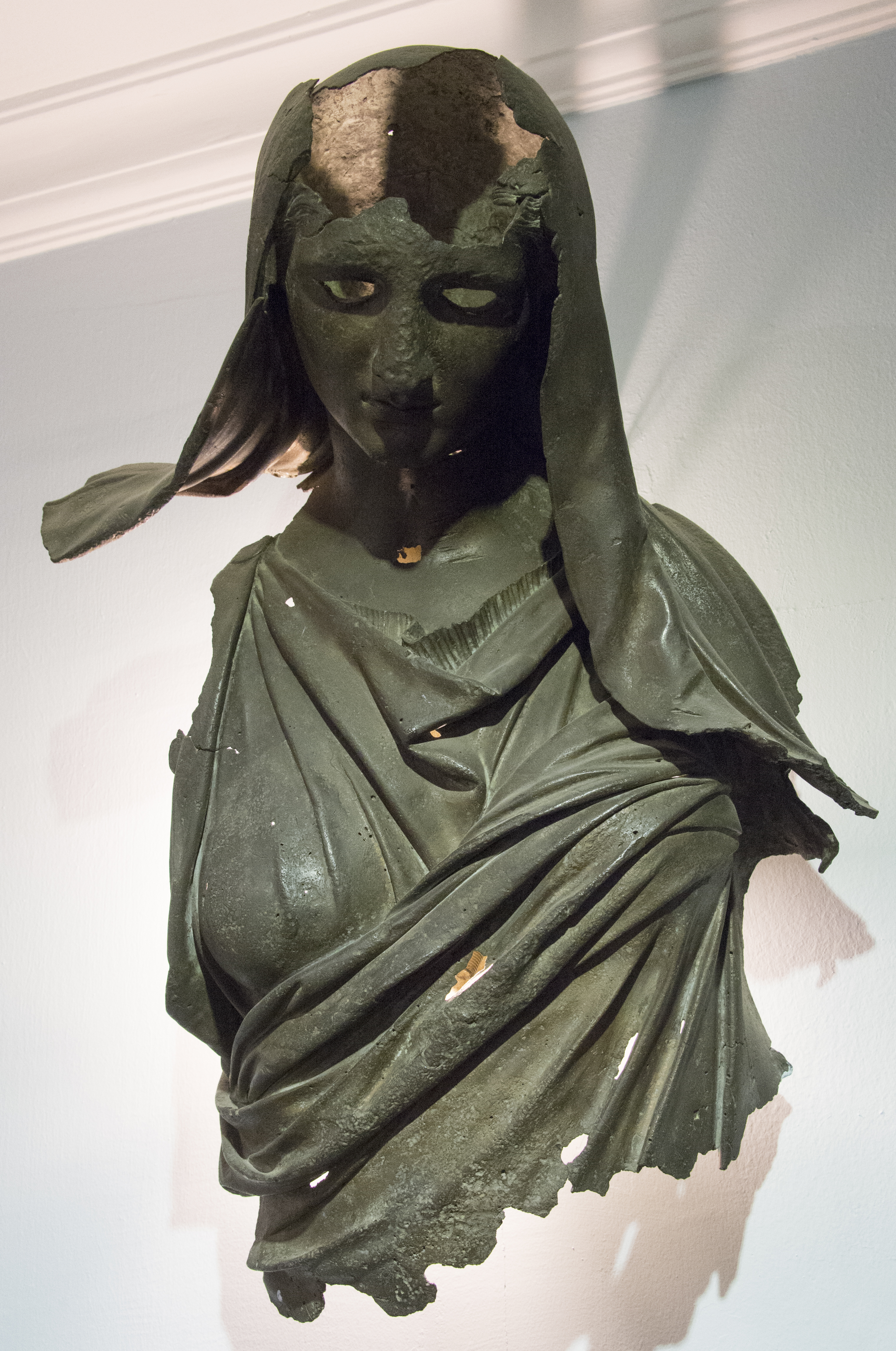
Bronze Demeter
