= Zeki Sayar =

- Born: 1905
- Died: 2000 (aged 94–95)
- Occupations: Architect; Journalist; Publisher

Zeki Sayar (1905–2000) was a Turkish architect, journalist and the publisher of Turkey's first architectural magazine, Arkikekt.. His purpose was to introduce Turkish architects to the public to improve their prospects.

== Arkitekt ==
The first architectural magazine of Turkey was called Arkitekt. Sayar introduced it with Abidin Mortaş and A.Ziya Kozanoğlu in 1935.At first, the magazine was called Mimar (architect in Turkish). They were forced to change its name by the Press Public Directorate, after a linguistic revolution in Turkey. They picked their name on that of the Finnish magazine Arkkitehti, given that Finnish and Turkish are part of the same language group. Both Mortaş and Kozanoğlu left and Zeki Sayar continued to publish Arkitekt for 50 years. Sayar translated and published writings of Famous architects like Le Corbusier

== Other positions ==
- Lecturer by proxy in Government Arts Academy Devlet sanatlar Akademisi in 1939
- Architecture Consultant of Turkish Republic Central Bank İstanbul Section (T.C. Merkez Bankası İstanbul Şubesi) and Textile Exchange Factories (Mensucat Santral Fabrikaları) 1942–1950
- Council member of Istanbul Public Council 1944-1950
- Chairman of Turkish Master of Arts Architects Federation 1945–1948
- Co-founder of Chamber of Architects in 1954

== Awards ==
- Honorary PhD degree from Istanbul Government Fine Arts Academy for his efforts to promote Turkish architecture in both locally and internationally in 1972
- Chamber of Architects gave him an Honour plaque (“onur plaketi”) in 1981
- Chamber of Architects gave him profession assistance accomplishment reward (“mesleğe katkı başarı ödülü”) in 1988

== Interior Colonization (Kolonisation Interieure) ==
Zeki Sayar promoted interior colonization in Arkitekt. Interior colonization is used since 1929 in European countries to return a migrated population to small cities instead of big cities. He was against one plan type and wrote that architects should consider villagers' way of life and tradition. He believed there should be standardized ovens, bathrooms and kitchens to familiarize villagers with modern ways and one type of local building materials for later repairs.
