= Buca Gölet =

Public park in İzmir, Turkey

- Interactive map of Buca Gölet
- Location: İzmir, Turkey
- Coordinates: 38.21°N 27.14°E
- Area: 16.7 ha (41 acres)
- Created: 1999; 27 years ago
- Website: "Manager's page".

Buca Gölet (literally Buca Pond) is an artificial lake and a recreation center on the lake in İzmir, Turkey. Buca gölet and the park is in Buca intracity district at about 38°21′N 27°14′E and was established in 1999 by the Buca municipality of İzmir. The total area of the center is 167,000 square metres (1,800,000 sq ft) . Some of the facilities are an amphitheatre, play ground for children, livestock paddock, sea food and fast food restaurants, coffee houses, picnic areas and observation terraces.
