= İzmir International Fair =

Coordinates: 38.42663°N 27.14524°E

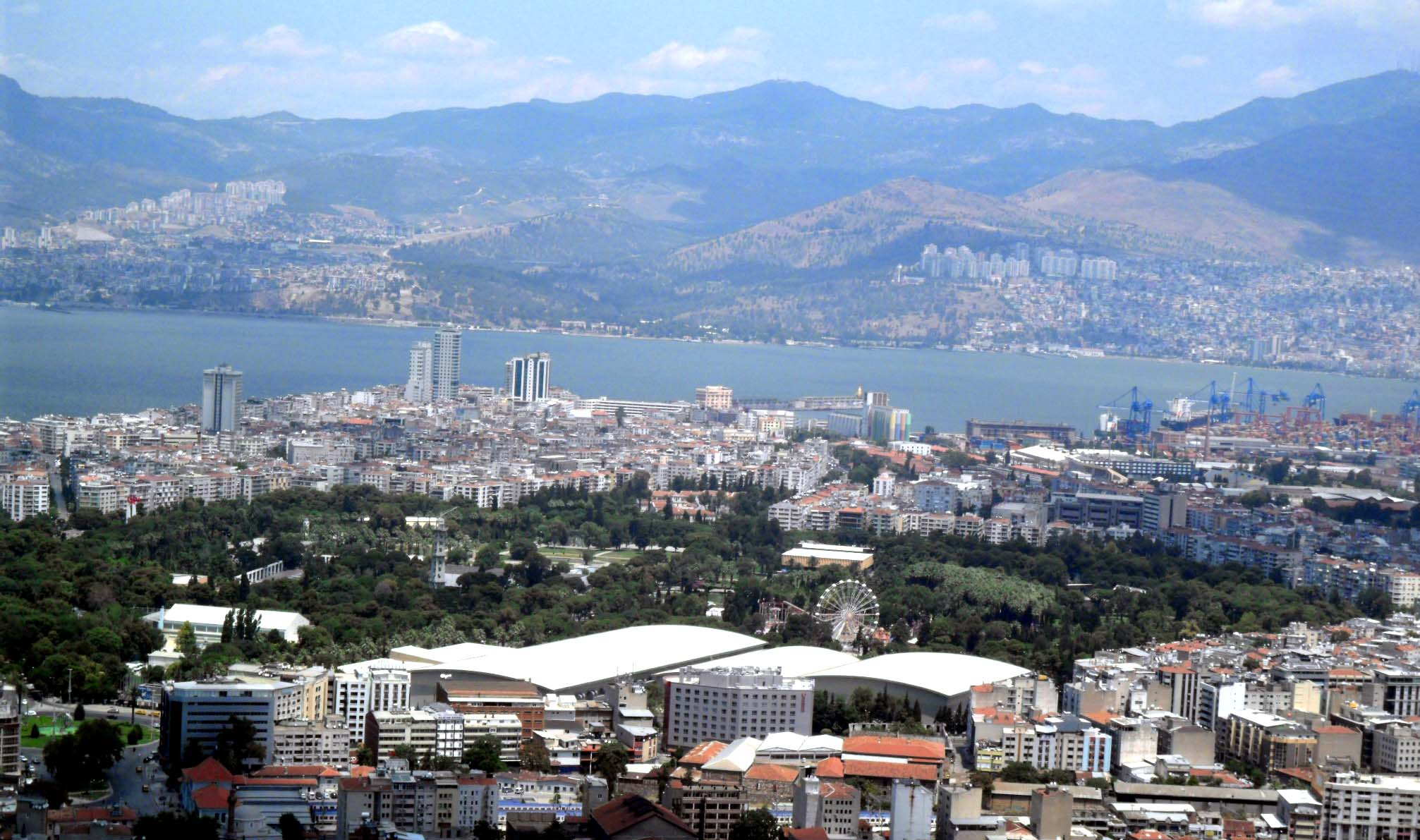
Kültürpark, which hosts the İzmir International Fair seen from Kadifekale

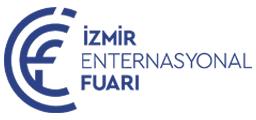
İzmir International Fair logo

The İzmir International Fair (Turkish: İzmir Enternasyonal Fuarı) is the oldest tradeshow in Turkey, considered the cradle of Turkey's fairs and expositions industry, and is also notable for hosting a series of simultaneous festival activities. The fair and the festival are held in the compound of İzmir's vast inner city park named Kültürpark in the first days of September, and organized by İZFAŞ, a depending company of İzmir Metropolitan Municipality. The 87th İzmir International Fair took place between 7–16 September 2018. İzmir International Fair is also the most venerable member (since 1948) from Turkey of UFI, the association of the world's leading tradeshow organisers and fairground owners, as well as the major national and international associations of the exhibition industry, and its partners. The musical and other cultural events that accompany the commercial fair and that had actually started out as an auxiliary activity to attract popular interest for the event have become, over the years, a school by themselves.

The fair itself is not limited to a theme, the participants are generally simply required to expose products with export or import potential, although each year a specific field of activity, a country and a Turkish province is put in limelight. The 2006 fair, for example, had organic farming and renewable energy sources (RES) as main themes, with participants to the fair from Austria as privileged partners at international level, and those from Turkey's Denizli Province at national level. Fields of activity or expertise relating to such sectors as the automotive industry, electric tools and devices, electronics, working machinery and equipment, foodstuff and packaging have always been well represented in İzmir Fair.

The 2006 fair was expected to be visited by up to a million and a half people. 80 thousand meter squares of exposition space was used, 25 thousand of which is covered space. The venue of the event, Kültürpark, corresponds to the city quarters ravaged by the 1922 Great Fire of Smyrna.
