= Behçet Uz =

Turkish politician

Dr. Behçet Uz
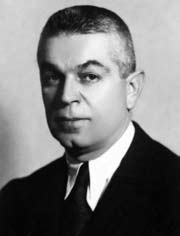
- Ömer Behçet Uz (1939)

Mayor of İzmir
- In office 1931–1941
- Preceded by: Sezai Göker
- Succeeded by: Reşat Leblebicioğlu

Minister of Commerce
- In office 9 July 1942 – 9 March 1943
- Prime Minister: Şükrü Saracoğlu
- Preceded by: Mümtaz Ökmen
- Succeeded by: Celal Sait Siren

Minister of Health and Social Security
- In office 7 August 1946 – 16 January 1949
- Prime Minister: Recep Peker, Hasan Saka
- Preceded by: Sadi Konuk
- Succeeded by: Kemali Bayazıt

Minister of Health and Social Security
- In office 17 June 1954 – 9 December 1955
- Prime Minister: Adnan Menderes
- Preceded by: Ekrem Hayri Üstündağ
- Succeeded by: Nafiz Körez

Personal details
- Born: 1893 Buldan, Denizli Province, Ottoman Empire
- Died: May 19, 1986 (aged 92–93) Istanbul, Turkey
- Education: Istanbul University School of Medicine
- Occupation: Politician
- Profession: Physician

Ömer Behçet Uz (1893 – 19 May 1986) was a Turkish physician, politician, former mayor of İzmir and government minister.

== Biography ==
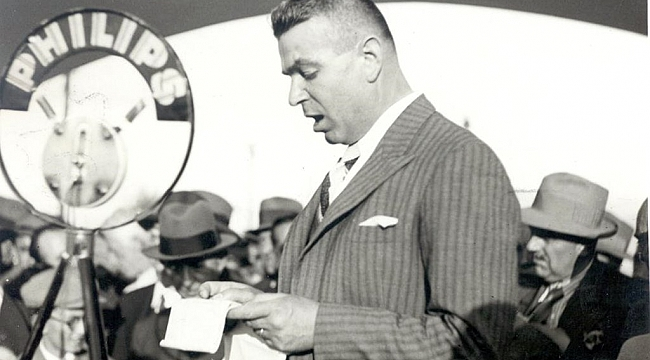
Behçet Uz giving a speech

He was born in Buldan ilçe (district) of Denizli Province, Ottoman Empire in 1893. He studied in İzmir High School, which was later renamed to Atatürk High School, and in the School of Medicine of Istanbul University. After working in Istanbul, he moved to İzmir to practice pediatrics. In 1922, he founded Veremle Mücadele Derneği ("Society to Struggle Against Tuberculosis")

In 1931, he was elected as the Mayor of İzmir. In this post, he served for ten years. He was instrumental in establishing Kültürpark, erecting the Atatürk Monument, establishing playgrounds, market squares, constructing some streets. In 1941, he was elected as a Republican People's Party (CHP) deputy from Denizli Province.

Between 9 July 1942 and 9 March 1943, he was the Minister of Commerce in the 13th government of Turkey. Between 7 August 1946 and 10 June 1948 in the 15th and the 16th government of Turkey, he was the Minister of Health and Social Security.

After the CHP lost the parliament majority in the 1950 general election, he joined the Democrat Party. Between 17 June 1954 and 9 December 1955 in the 21st government of Turkey, he was again the Minister of Health and Social Security.

He died in 1986 in Istanbul The Dr. Behçet Uz Çocuk Hospital, a children's hospital is named in his honor.
