= Kültürpark =

Urban park in İzmir, Turkey

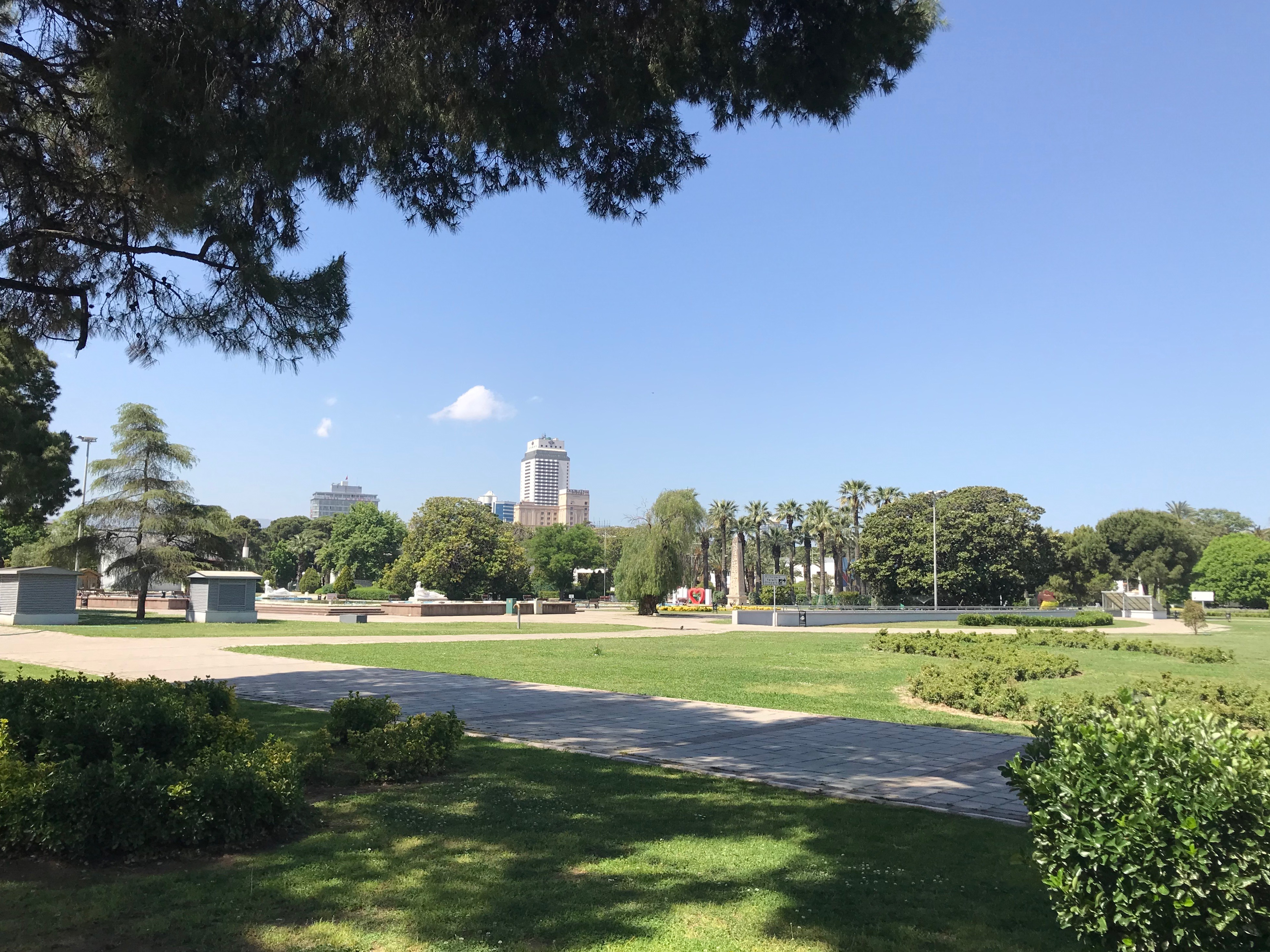
- A view of Kültürpark
- Interactive map of Kültürpark
- Type: Urban park
- Location: İzmir, Turkey
- Coordinates: 38°25′40″N 27°08′41″E
- Area: 420,000 m^{2} (4,500,000 sq ft)
- Opened: September 1, 1936
- Founder: Behçet Uz
- Operator: İzmir Metropolitan Municipality
- Status: Open all year
- Parking: 594 parking lots
- Public transit: Basmane; Kültürpark – Atatürk Lisesi
- Website: www.kulturparkizmir.org

Kültürpark is an urban park in İzmir, Turkey. It is located in the district of Konak, roughly bounded by Dr. Mustafa Enver Bey Avenue on the north, 1395th Street, 1396th Street and Bozkurt Avenue on the east, Mürsel Paşa Boulevard on the south, and Dr. Refik Saydam and Şair Eşref boulevards on the west.

Kültürpark was founded in 1936 on an area of 360,000 m^{2} (3,900,000 sq ft), which was ruined by the great fire of Smyrna. Since then, it has been hosting the İzmir International Fair. In 1939, the park expanded to 420,000 m^{2} (4,500,000 sq ft).

== History ==
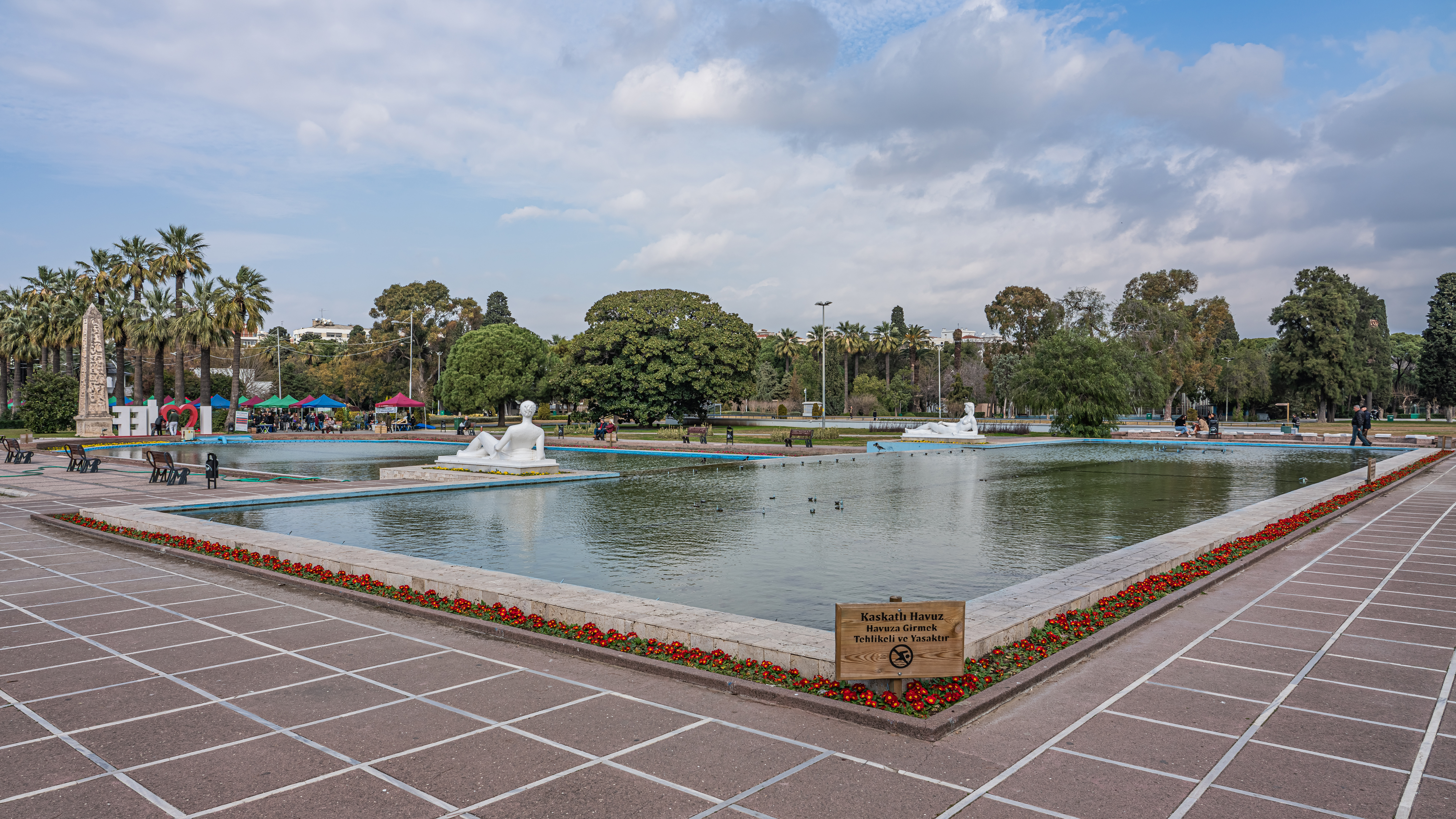
A fountain in Kültürpark

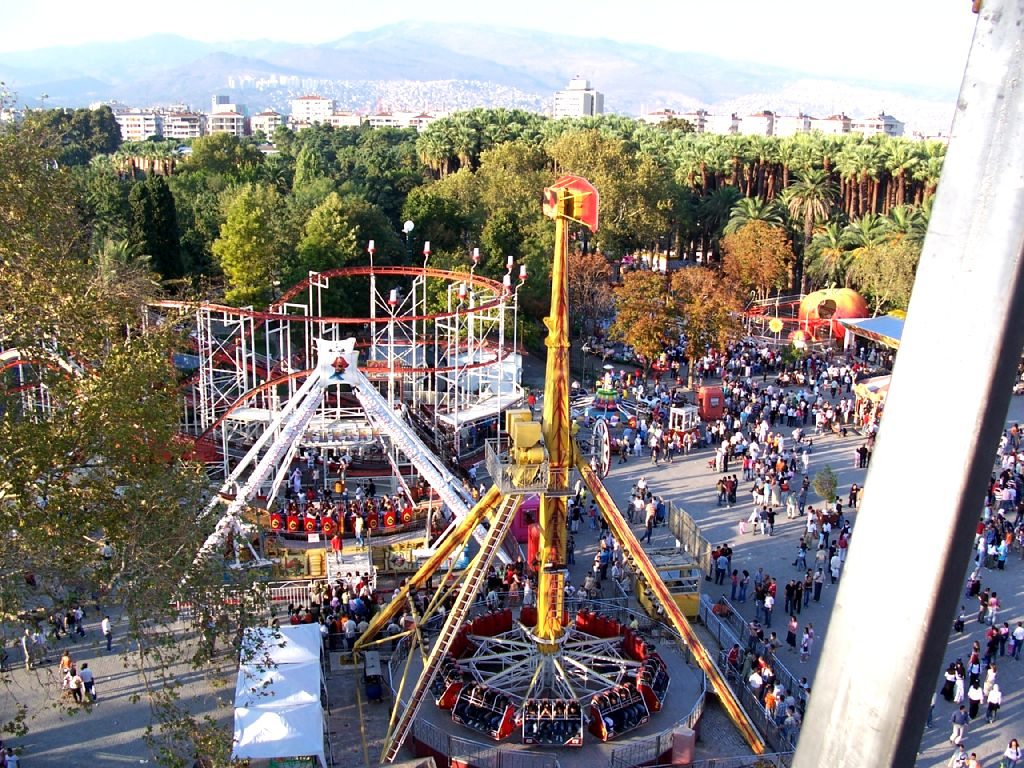
Amusement park in Kültürpark

The third edition of the 9th of September Fair was held in 1933 on an area next to Cumhuriyet Square where Swissôtel Büyük Efes exists today. Deputy Mayor Suat Yurtkoru shared his thoughts with Mayor Behçet Uz that the fairground wouldn't be enough in the coming years and the city needs a place like Gorky Park in Moscow. The report prepared by Yurtkoru at Uz's request was accepted in the municipal council on May 14, 1934 and the construction of Kültürpark was approved. Uz went to Moscow in 1935 and had two architects commissioned by Mayor Nikolai Bulganin draft a project.

The debris in the 360,000 m^{2} (3,900,000 sq ft)-area, which was ruined by the great fire of Smyrna, started to be cleaned in the second half of 1934 and the foundation of Kültürpark was laid on January 1, 1936. Before the fire, there was an Armenian quarter in this area. Kültürpark was opened to the public on September 1, 1936 with the 6th İzmir International Fair, inaugurated by Prime Minister İsmet İnönü. In 1937, İzmir Parachute Tower was built in the park. In 1938, İzmir Zoo and Vakıflar Pavilion and Clock Tower were opened. In 1939, the park was expanded for 60,000 m^{2} (650,000 sq ft) southwards and has reached 420,000 m^{2} (4,500,000 sq ft) in size. In 1951, the İzmir Archaeological Museum moved into the park where it was active until 1984. In September 1952, the İzmir Art and Sculpture Museum was opened in the park and moved to its new building, which was built outside the park in 1973. In 2004, İzmir Museum of History and Art was established inside the park. With the opening of İzmir Wildlife Park in 2008, the zoo in the park was closed and the animals were moved to the new area. In August 2009, an underground car park with 594 vehicle capacity was put into service. In June 2015, free Wi-Fi was made available in the park. All the fairs in the city were organized in Kültürpark before Fuar İzmir was built in 2015 in Gaziemir. Today only İzmir International Fair and İzmir Book Fair are held in the park. In 2017, the Kültürpark Cup tennis tournament was held for the first time.

== Features ==
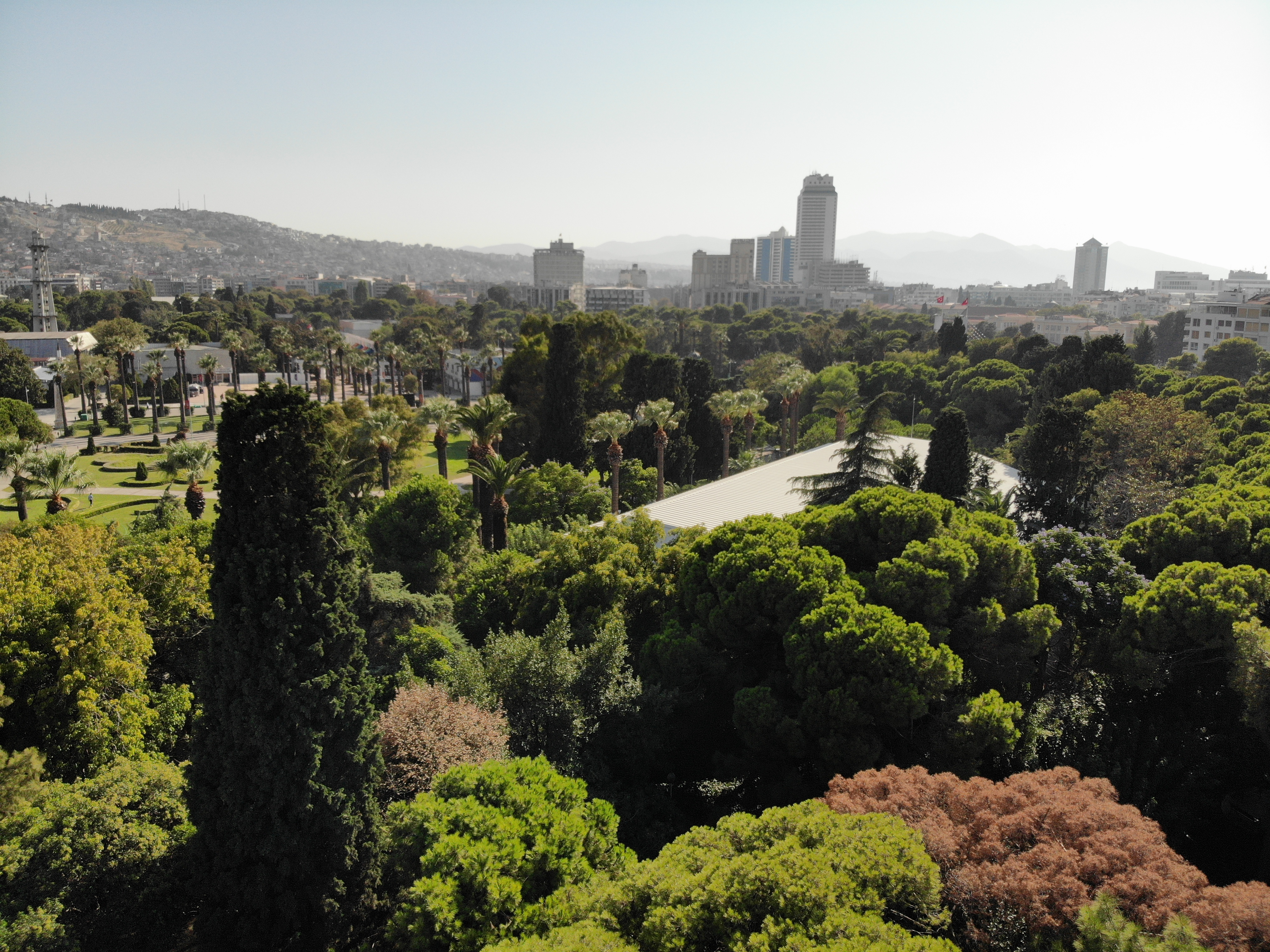
Aerial view of Kültürpark

Kültürpark, which is surrounded by walls, has five entrance gates: Lozan Gate, Montrö Gate, 9 Eylül Gate, Cumhuriyet Gate, and 26 Ağustos Gate. (The first two refer to two international treaties, namely the Treaty of Lausanne and the Montreux Convention respectively, the third refers to the date of the liberation of İzmir, the forth means Republic, and the last refers to the start date of the Battle of Dumlupınar, the last battle of the Turkish War of Independence.) Some of the facilities in the park are fourteen indoor exhibition halls, four conference halls, Atatürk Open Air Theater, İsmet İnönü Art Center, İzmir Sanat, a marriage office, Celal Atik Sport Hall, an amusement park, a parachute tower, Youth Theater, a museum, a 1,850-metre long running track, a swimming pool, tennis courts, and a football pitch. There are 7,709 trees across the park. All plants were tagged and trees were insured.
