= List of shopping malls in Turkey =

This is a list of shopping malls in Turkey. Opening year is given in parentheses.

== Adana ==
- Optimum Outlet (2011)

=== Projected ===
- Forum Adana

== Afyon ==
- Afium
- Zeyland Avm

== Aksaray ==
- Aksaray Efor AVM
- Aybimaş Gross (2020)

== Ankara ==
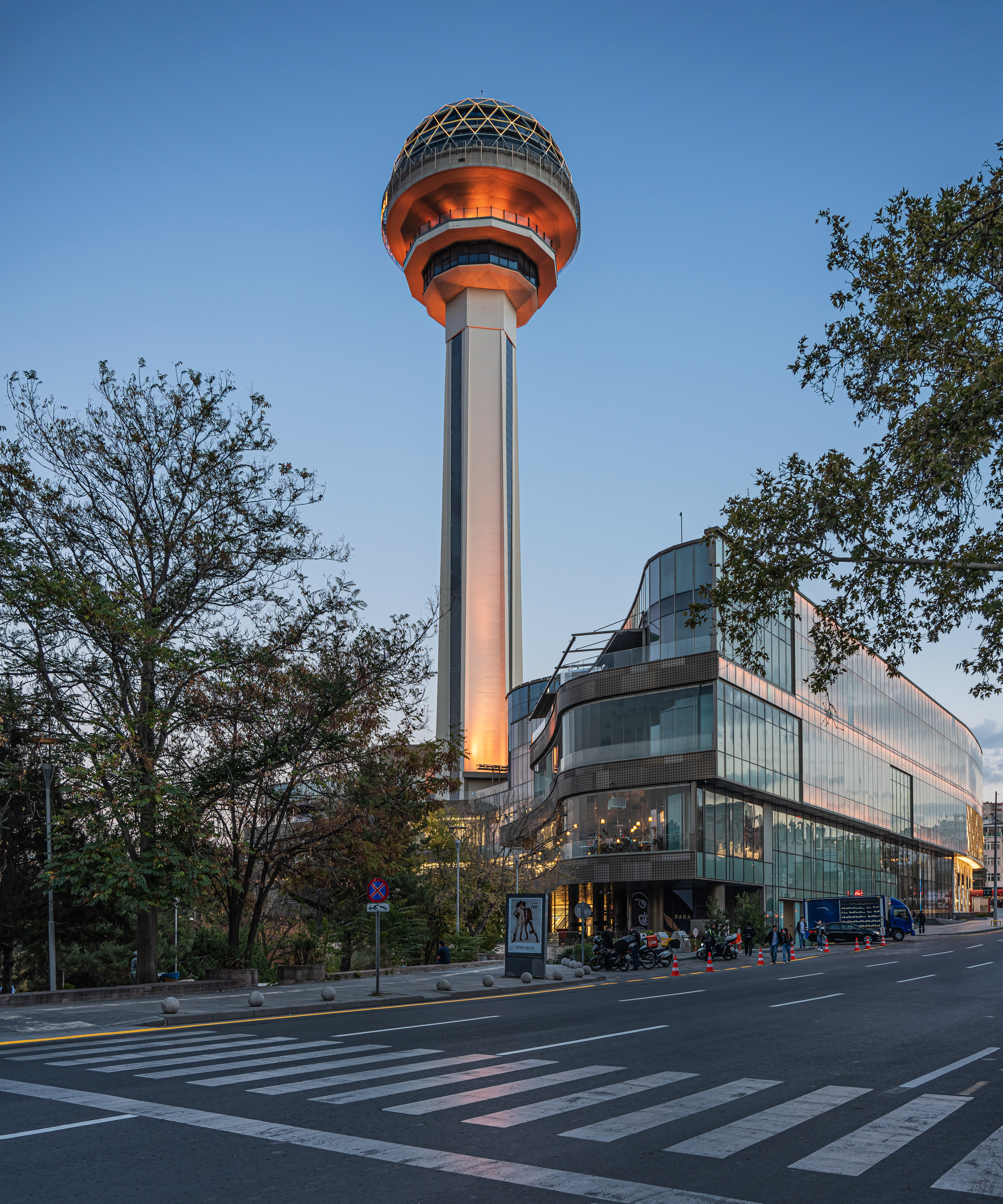
Atakule AVM

- 365 (2008), Çankaya
- Acity (2008), Yenimahalle
- Ankamall (1999), Akköprü, 107,000 m^{2} (2012)
- Antares (2008), Etlik, 85,000 m^{2} (2012)
- Arcadium (2003), Çayyolu
- Armada (2002), Söğütözü
- Atlantis (2011), Batıkent
- Aybimaş Tanzim (2019), Yenimahalle
- Cepa (2007), Mustafa Kemal, 73,000 m^{2} (2012)
- Forum Ankara (2008), 86,300 m^{2} (2012)
- Gimart (2014), Yenimahalle
- Gordion (2009), Çayyolu
- Karum (1991), Kavaklıdere
- KentPark (2009), Mustafa Kemal, 80,000 m^{2} (2012)
- Minasera (2008), Çayyolu
- Nata Vega (2011), Mamak
- Next Level (2013), Söğütözü
- Optimum Outlet (2004), Etimesgut
- Panora (2008), Or-An, 80,000 m^{2} (2012)
- Park Vera (2014), Etimesgut
- Podium (2015), Yenimahalle
- Taurus (2013), Balgat

== Antalya ==
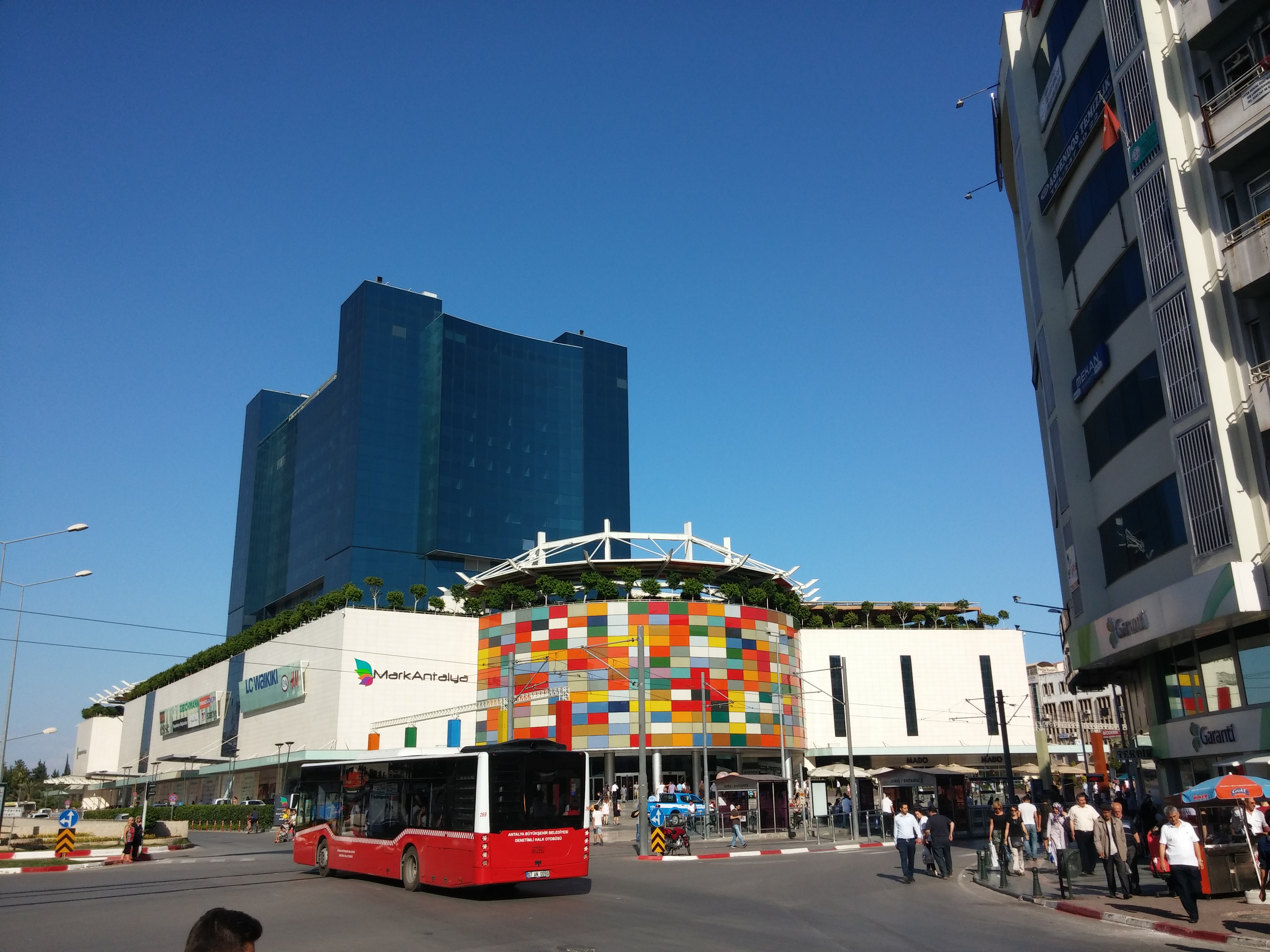
MarkAntalya

- Antalya Migros Shopping Center (2001)
- Deepo Outlet Center (2004), Altınova
- Kipa AVM, Fabrikalar
- Laura Shopping Center (2004), Lara
- Mark Antalya, Muratpaşa
- Özdilek Park (2009), Dokuma
- Real Shopping Mall (2006), Muratpaşa
- Shemall (2008), Lara
- Terra City (2011), Lara

== Artvin ==
- İstanbul Bazzar (2010), Hopa
- Artrium AVM (?)

== Aydın ==
- OPS mall (2023)

== Balıkesir ==
- Yaylada (2007)

== Bolu ==
- Bekcioğlu Avm (2009)

== Bursa ==
- Anatolium AVM (2010)
- As Merkez Outlet (2003)
- CarrefourSA (2002)
- Kent Meydani (2008)
- Korupark (2007)
- Özdilek (1983)
- Zafer Plaza (1999)
- Sur Yapi Marka AVM (2017)

== Denizli ==
- Forum Çamlık (2008)
- Teras Park (2007)

== Diyarbakır ==
- Ceylan Karavil Park (2014)
- Forum Diyarbakır (2015)

== Edirne ==
- Margi Outlet (2011)
- Edirne Erasta AVM

== Elazığ ==
- Misland
- Park 23
- Elysium

== Erzurum ==
- Erzurum Avm (2009)

== Eskişehir ==
- Espark (2007)
- Kanatlı (2007)
- Neo Eskişehir (2007)
- Özdilek (2011)

== Gaziantep ==
- Forum Gaziantep (2013)
- M1 Tepe Gaziantep (1999)
- Prime Mall Gaziantep (2013)
- Sanko Park (2009)

== Hatay ==
- Palladium Antakya (2013)
- Prime Mall Antakya (2011)
- Prime Mall İskenderun (2010)

== Isparta ==
- IYAŞ Park Avm (2008)

== Istanbul ==
- List of shopping malls in Istanbul

== İzmir ==
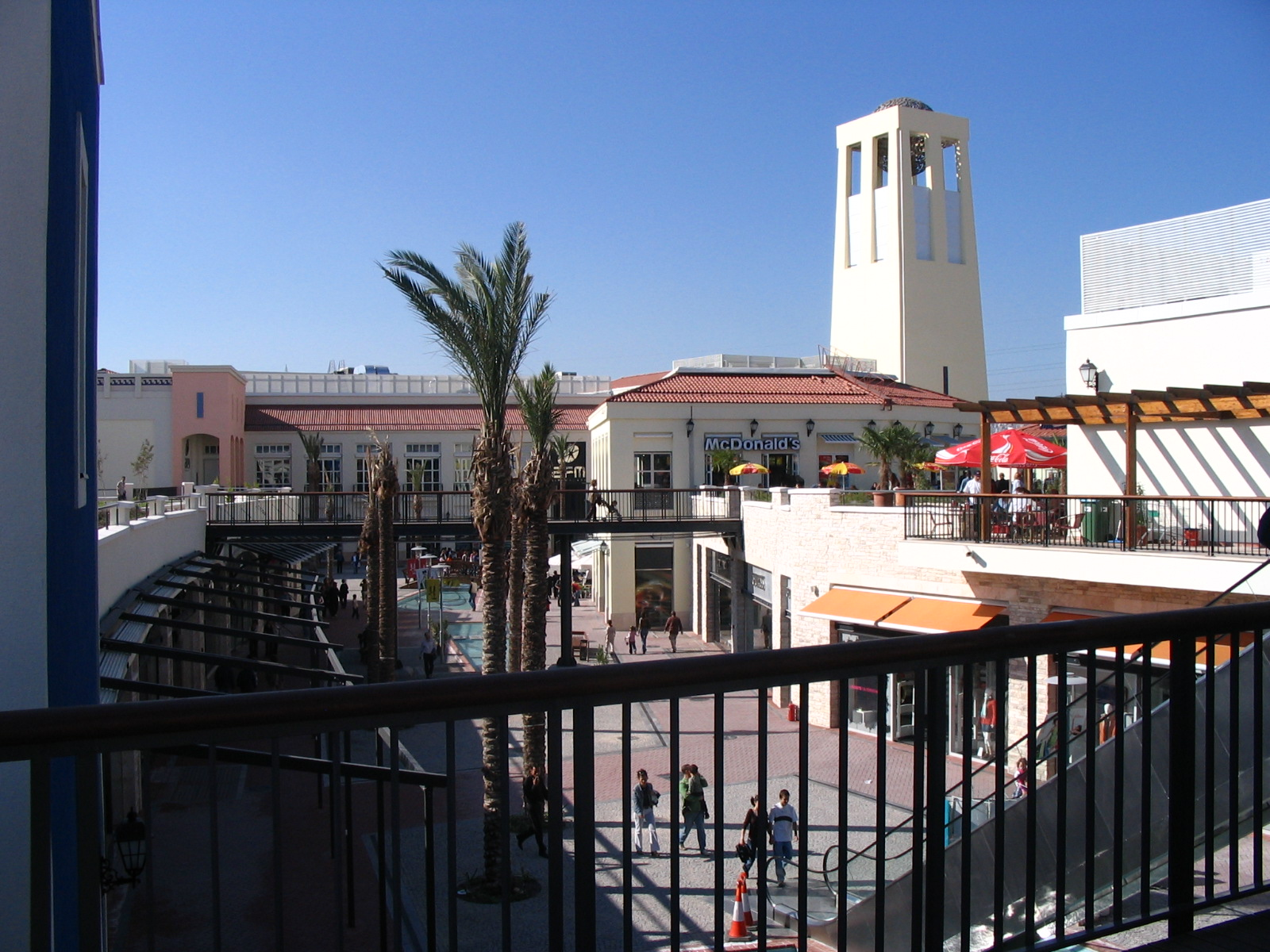
Forum Bornova is inspired in its conception by İzmir's traditional architecture.

- Agora (2003), Balçova
- Asmaçatı Shopping and Meeting Point (2011), Balçova
- CarrefourSA Shopping Center (2000), Karşıyaka (damaged)
- Ege Park Balçova (2010), Balçova
- Ege Park Mavişehir (1999), (previously EGS Park Mavişehir), Karşıyaka
- Forum Bornova Shopping Center (2006), Bornova
- İzmir Park (2014), Konak
- Kids Mall (2012), Bornova
- Konak Pier, Konak Pier (2002), Konak
- Optimum İzmir (2012), Gaziemir
- Özdilek (2001), Balçova
- Palmiye Shopping Center (2003), Balçova
- Park Bornova Outlet Center (2004), (previously EGS Park Bornova (1997) and EGS Outlet (2000)), Bornova
- Selway Outlet Park, Balçova
- Tesco-Kipa Shopping Center, Balçova
- Tesco-Kipa Shopping Center (1998), Çiğli
- Mavibahçe, (2015) Karşıyaka
- Ege Perla Mall (2017), Konak
- Point Bornova Mall(2016), Bornova

=== Projected ===
- Hilltown Karşıyaka, Karşıyaka (2019)

== Kahramanmaraş ==
- Arnelia AVM 2008
- Arsan Outlet Center 2008
- Rönesans Piazza AVM (2013)

== Karabük ==
- Atamerkez Avm (2002), Safranbolu
- Kares Avm (2011)
- Onel Avm (2006)

== Kastamonu ==
- Barutçuoğlu Avm (2006)

== Kayseri ==
- Byz Garage Avm (2013)
- Forum Kayseri (2012)
- İpeksaray Avm (2006)
- Kasseria Avm (1996)
- Kayseri Park (2006)
- Meysu Outlet Avm (2011)

== Kırıkkale ==
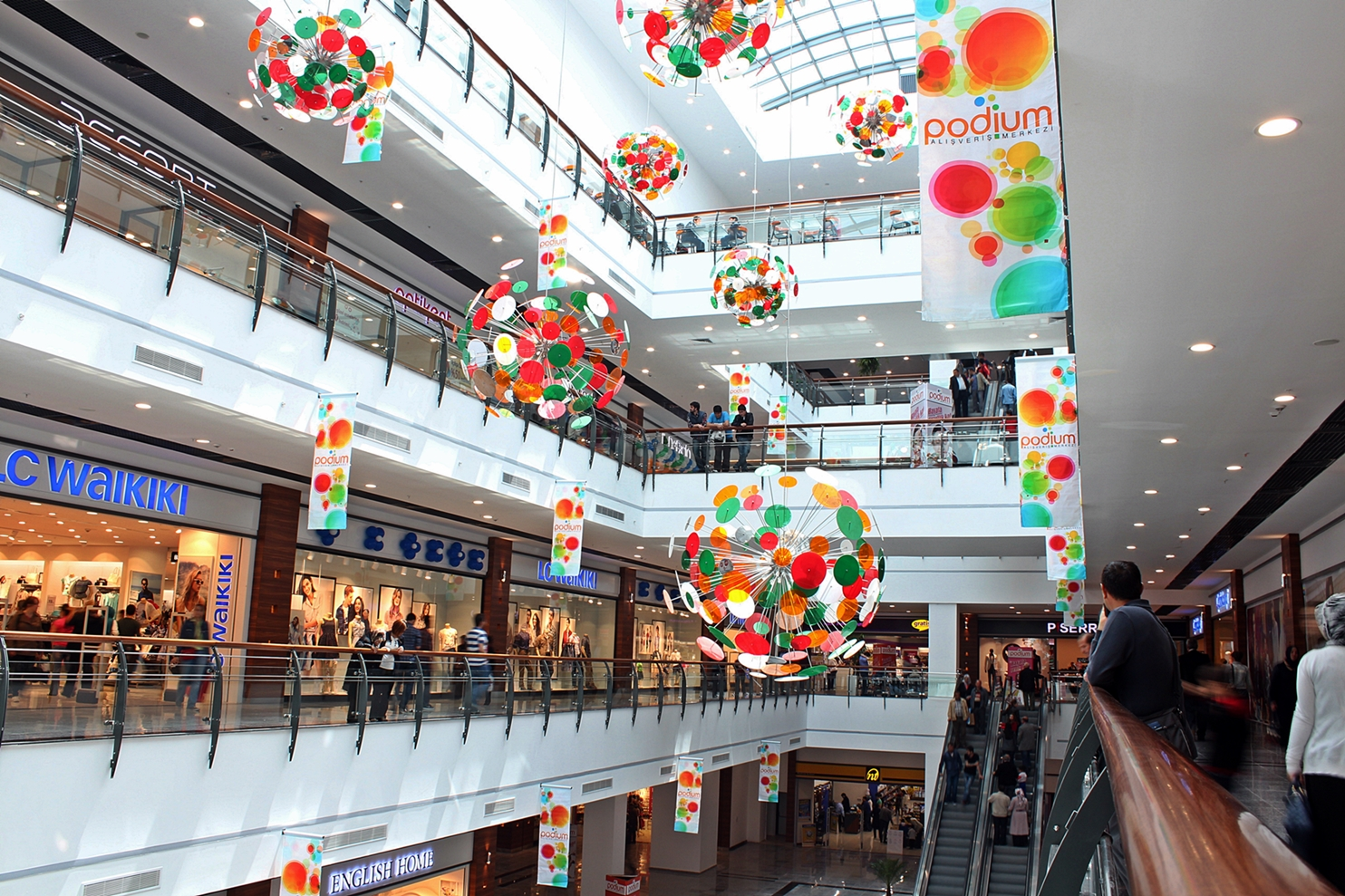
Kırıkkale Podium Shopping Mall

- Aybimaş (1982)
- Altunbilekler AVM (2012)
- Makro Market (2006)
- Podium AVM (2014)

== Kocaeli ==
- Gebze Center (2010)

== Kuşadası, Aydın ==
- Kuşadası AVM (2013)

== Malatya ==
- Malatya Park (2009)

== Manisa ==
- Magnesia (2012)

== Mersin ==
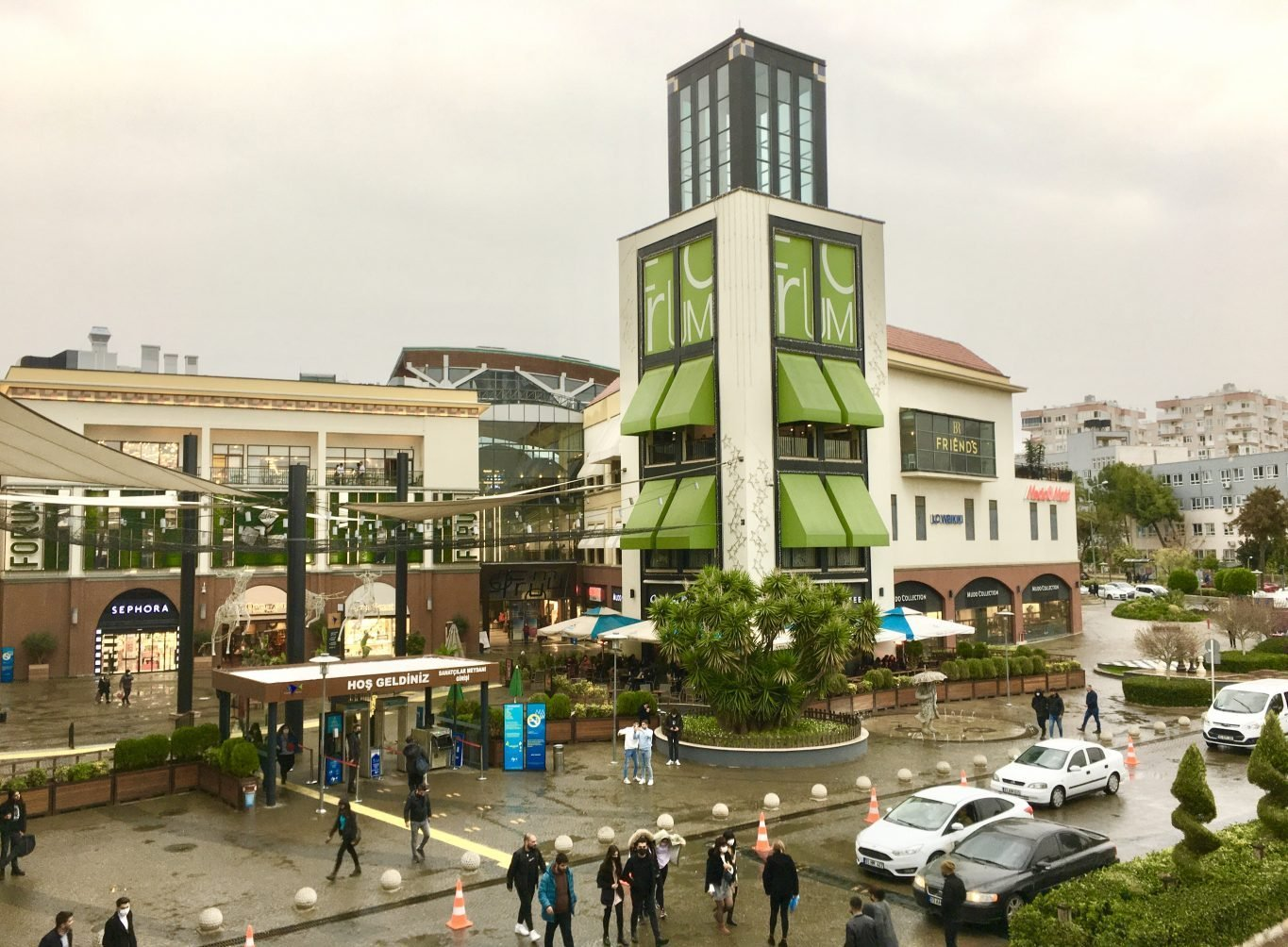
Forum Bornova is inspired in its conception by İzmir's traditional architecture.

- Mersin Forum (2007)
- Kipa Outlet (2008)
- Mersin Marina (2011)
- Palmcity (2014)

=== Tarsus, Mersin ===
- Tarsu (2012)

== Muğla ==
=== Bodrum ===
- Midtown (2012)
- Milta (1999)
- Oasis (1998)
- Palmarina (2014)

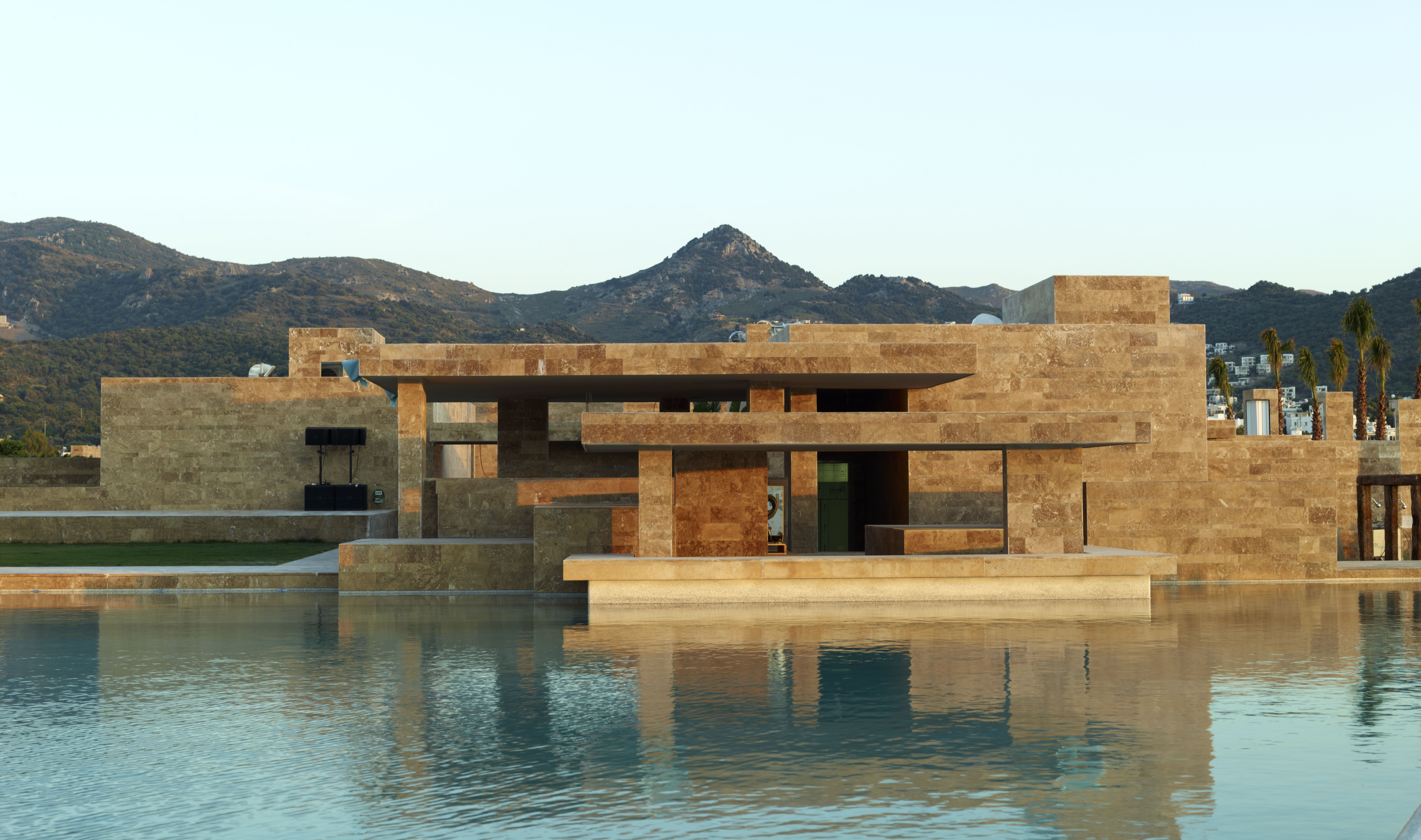
Palmarina Bodrum Yalikavak.

=== Fethiye ===
- Erasta (2014)
- Tesco-Kipa Shopping Center (2010)

=== Menteşe, Muğla ===
- Rüya Park (2025)

== Nevşehir ==
- Forum Kapadokya (2010)

== Sakarya ==
- Ada Avm (2007), Adapazarı
- Agora Avm (2015), Adapazarı
- Kipa Avm (2010), Adapazarı
- Serdivan Avm (2010), Adapazarı

== Samsun ==
- Bulvar Samsun (2012)
- Lovelet (2012)

== Şanlıurfa ==
- Piazza Şanlıurfa (2013)

== Tekirdağ ==
- Tekira (2008)

=== Çorlu ===
- Avantaj Outlet Center (1997)
- Orion (1999)
- Trend Arena (2016)

== Trabzon ==
- Cevahir Outlet Avm (2009)
- Forum Trabzon (2008)
- Varlıbaş AVM (2010)

== Zonguldak ==
- DemirPark
- Ereylin

== See also ==
- List of shopping malls
