= Sancaklı, Karşıyaka =

Sancaklı
- Neighbourhood
- Location in Turkey Sancaklı (İzmir)
- Coordinates: 38°31′N 27°09′E
- Country: Turkey
- Province: İzmir
- District: Karşıyaka
- Elevation: 365 m (1,198 ft)
- Population (2022): 171
- Time zone: UTC+3 (TRT)
- Postal code: 35580
- Area code: 0232

Sancaklı is a neighbourhood in the municipality and district of Karşıyaka, İzmir Province, Turkey. Its population is 171 (2022). Sancaklı is situated to the north of İzmir city centre and to the south of Yamanlar Mountain. Distance to Karşıyaka is 7 kilometres (4.3 mi). Main economic activity of the village is animal breeding and dairying. Beekeeping is also promoted.
