= Karagöl Nature Park =

Nature park in Turkey

- Karagöl Tabiat Parkı
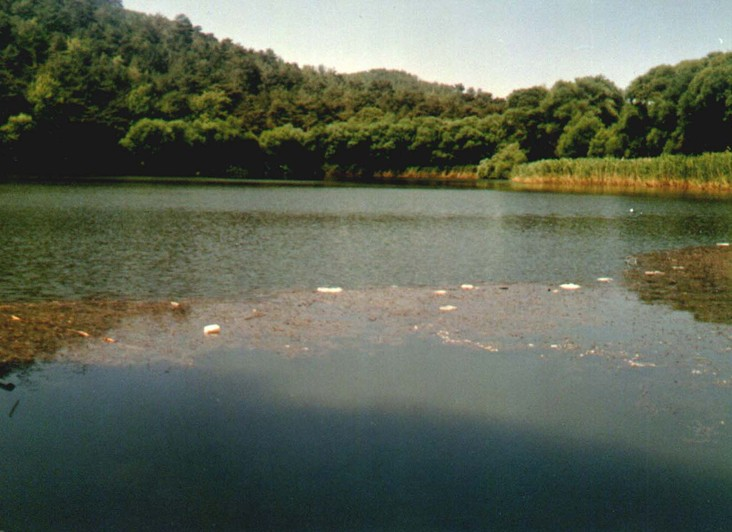
- Karagöl

- Location within Turkey
- Location: Yamanlar Mountains, Menemen, İzmir Province, Turkey
- Coordinates: 38°23′26″N 27°13′02″E
- Area: 18.92 ha (46.8 acres)
- Governing body: Directorate-General of Nature Protection and National Parks; Ministry of Environment and Forest

Karagöl Nature Park (Turkish: Karagöl Tabiat Parkı) a nature park in Turkey

It is in the rural area of Menemen ilçe (district) of İzmir Province at 38°23′26″N 27°13′02″E on Yamanlar Mountains which are situated to the north of İzmir. Its distance to İzmir centrum is 35 kilometres (22 mi).The road although quite bended, offers splendid view of the gulf of İzmir.

The altitude of the park is 850 metres (2,790 ft). It surrounds a small crater lake named "Karagöl". The area of the park including the lake is 18.92 hectares (46.8 acres).
