= Ege Park Mavişehir Shopping Center =

EGE PARK MAVİŞEHİR Shopping Centre
- Location: Karşıyaka, İzmir, Turkey
- Coordinates: 38.471466°N 27.074972°E
- Address: 2040 street, no:104, Quartier Mavişehir
- Opened: 20 November 1999
- Closed: 2023
- Manager: Kâzım Pırlant
- Owner: EGS Holding (1999–2006); Kazım Pırlant (2006–present)

Ege Park Mavişehir Shopping Center (Turkish: Ege Park Mavişehir Alışveriş Merkezi) was one of the first shopping centres in İzmir, Turkey. It is located in Karşıyaka, covering an area of 18.000 square metres (193.75 sq ft). It was opened on 20 November 1999 as EGS Park Mavişehir Shopping Centre by EGS Holding. This mall was operated by the Turkish clothing industrial company from İzmir EGS Holding from 1999 to 2006. But after the bankruptcy of EGS Holding in 2001 due to the economic crisis in Turkey, the management of the shopping center was transferred to Kâzım Pırlant, a businessman from İzmir living in the United States in 2006. This mall has 115 shops and 1 supermarket. This shopping center was transferred in 2006. The owner of this mall has opened another shopping center in Balçova in 2009.
