= Yamanlar, Karşıyaka =

Yamanlar
- Neighbourhood
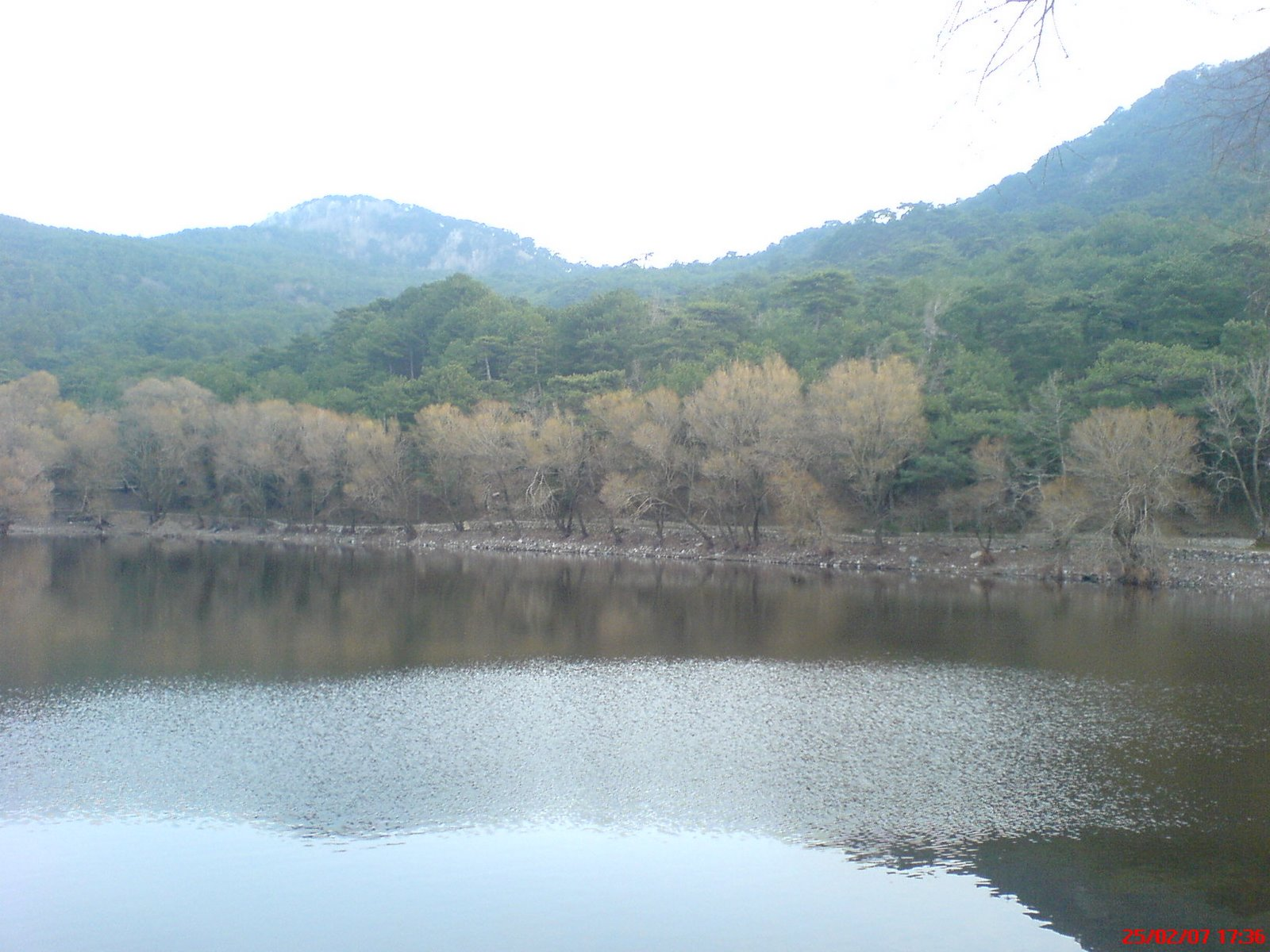
- Lake Karagöl (Tantalus)

- Location within Turkey Location within İzmir
- Coordinates: 38°32′30″N 27°08′0″E
- Country: Turkey
- Province: İzmir
- District: Karşıyaka
- Elevation: 495 m (1,624 ft)
- Population (2022): 152
- Time zone: UTC+3 (TRT)
- Postal code: 35580
- Area code: 0232

Yamanlar is a neighbourhood in the municipality and district of Karşıyaka, İzmir Province, Turkey. Its population is 152 (2022). Yamanlar is situated to the north of İzmir and to the south of the mountain Yamanlar. Distance to Karşıyaka is 9 kilometres (5.6 mi).
