= Sakız house =

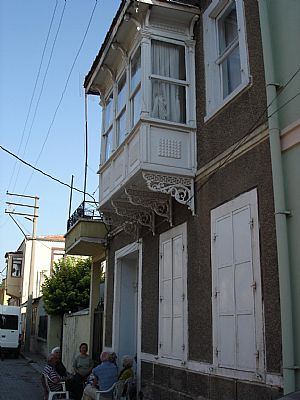
Street with old Sakız houses in Buca, Izmir, Turkey. Image: Mr. F. Sarikaya

Sakız house or Sakız type house (Turkish: Sakız evi) is a traditional type of house in Turkish architecture which are proper principally to Turkey's Aegean Sea coast. The first houses of this type date from the 19th century, and many are still in use. They gained an increased level of popularity among secondary summer residence owners in recent years, and the modern examples that are built follow the traditional lines in varying degrees.

Sakız houses are concentrated especially, from north to south, in Bergama, Foça, İzmir center and Karşıyaka, Çeşme and Alaçatı, and more to the south in lesser numbers. Some sources place within the definition of Sakız house traditional residences that were built as far as south as Kalkan and even in Karaman in Central Anatolia.

According to the rather scarce methodical research conducted until the present day, Sakız house pattern is thought to have derived from Musandıralı houses constructed as of the 18th century in Datça and Bodrum. The word "Sakız" means "mastic" or "gum" in Turkish, and it is also the Turkish name for the Chios island and the town. It is not established with certainty to which of these meanings the word "Sakız" should be associated with in architectural context.

They are distinguished with their built-in front entry and bare façades, on the which a bay window or a balcony of usually small dimensions is often found. The overall dimensions can be extremely narrow and the space is laid out in a way as to accentuate vertical extension, assuring natural balance of air conditioning and heating. Both detached and attached examples can be seen and they are directly connected to the street.
