= Yamanlar =

Mountain in Turkey

Mount Yamanlar
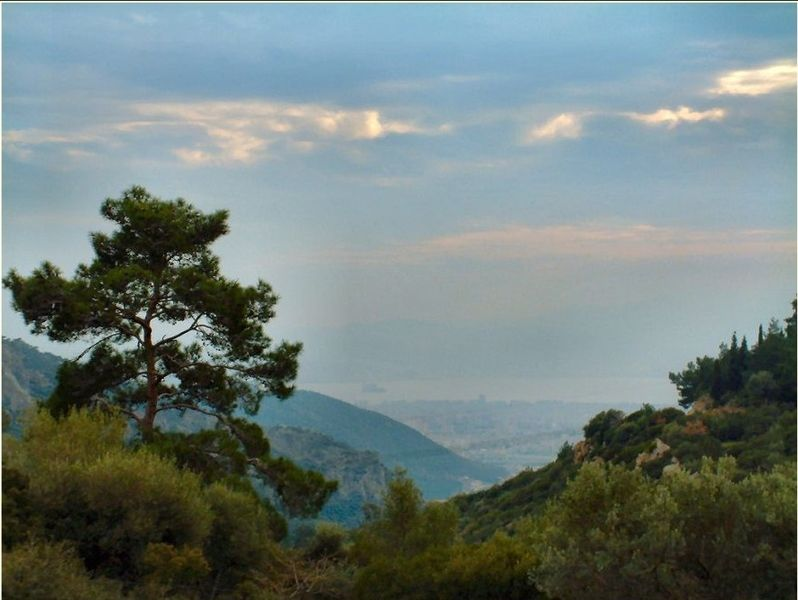
- View of the Gulf of İzmir from Mount Yamanlar

Highest point
- Elevation: 1,076 m (3,530 ft)
- Coordinates: 38°32′N 27°14′E

Geography
- Location within Turkey
- Location: Yamanlar village, Karşıyaka, İzmir, Turkey

Geology
- Mountain type: Shield volcano

Mount Yamanlar (Turkish: Yamanlar Dağı) is a mountain in İzmir Province, Turkey, located within the boundaries of the Greater Metropolitan Area of the city.

Easily accessible from Izmir, Yamanlar is a popular excursion spot for the inhabitants of the city. It is served by a steep, well maintained road. A village of the same name as the mountain (Yamanlar) is found on its slopes, on the road to the summit. The village administratively depends on İzmir's metropolitan district of Karşıyaka and is at a distance of 20 km (12 mi) from Karşıyaka center.

The summit commands an expansive view of the Gulf of İzmir from the northeast and there are amenities such as bungalows for visitors. A crater lake called "Karagöl" (meaning "Black Lake" in Turkish) is located near the summit, and is usually associated with the accounts surrounding Tantalus, the region's first known ruler. Because of this the lake's name is sometimes also called by his name.

== Mountain ==
The mountain is an extinct volcano. Although it is geologically separate from the neighboring mass of Mount Sipylus (Spil Dağı), their flora, fauna and history have very much in common, and the two mountains have sometimes been viewed as extensions of each other.

== Etymology ==
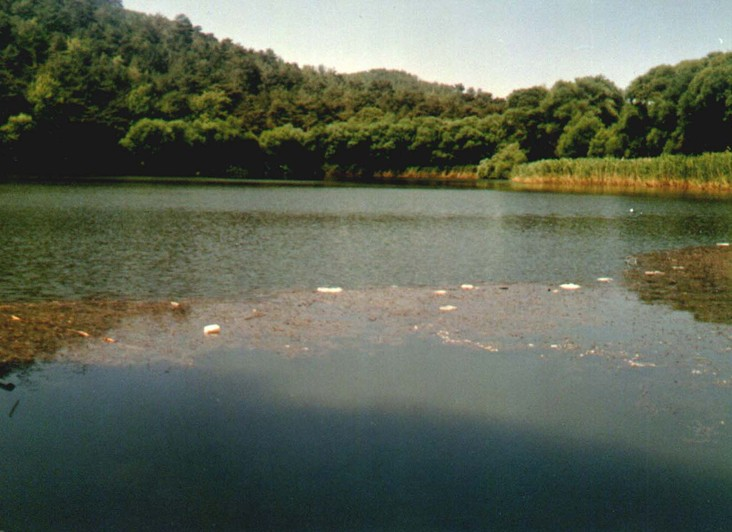
Karagöl (Lake Tantalus) near the summit of Mount Yamanlar

The name "Yamanlar" literally translates to "the capable ones", although the adjective "yaman" also has a number of negative connotations. The name is likely derived from the name of a monastery built in the beginning of the 13th century by John III Doukas Vatatzes. The monastery must have been named "Amanariotissa" or "Mary of Amanara", and was founded on the western slopes or foothills facing Smyrna of the Mount Nif, which itself was one of the mountains called Olympus in ancient times, hence the name of the principal monastery, Lembos. An impression about the status of the village in Mount Yamanlar, then called "Genikon" or "Jenikou" is created by a document of the 13th century written by the inhabitants by which they donated to the monastery of Lembos another monastery, that of Amanariotissa, which was located within their territory.

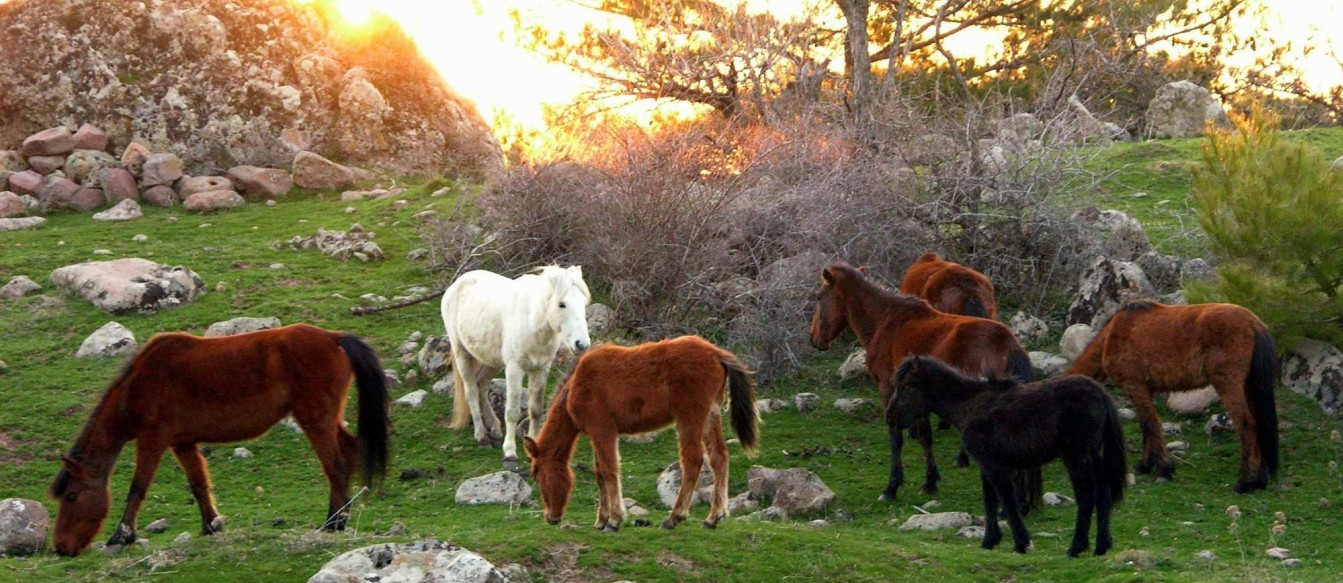
Wild horses roaming in Mount Yamanlar

On the other hand, Amanara, the root name referred to in the word Amanariotissa, being non-Greek, conjectural attempts have been made to explain the structure of the word through syncope, with the end corresponding to the Luwian language adjective "ura" (big), and the first part attachable to the deity name Amun or to proper nouns such as Amana and Amanus Mountains inter alia, transmitted here either through a Luwian connection once again or through the cult of Ammon well known to have been introduced into Greece at an early period or by the same token that led to the appellation of the ancient city of Larissa, within eyesight from the northern flank of the mountain, as "Egyptian Larissa", or to an interaction of these possibilities.

== History ==
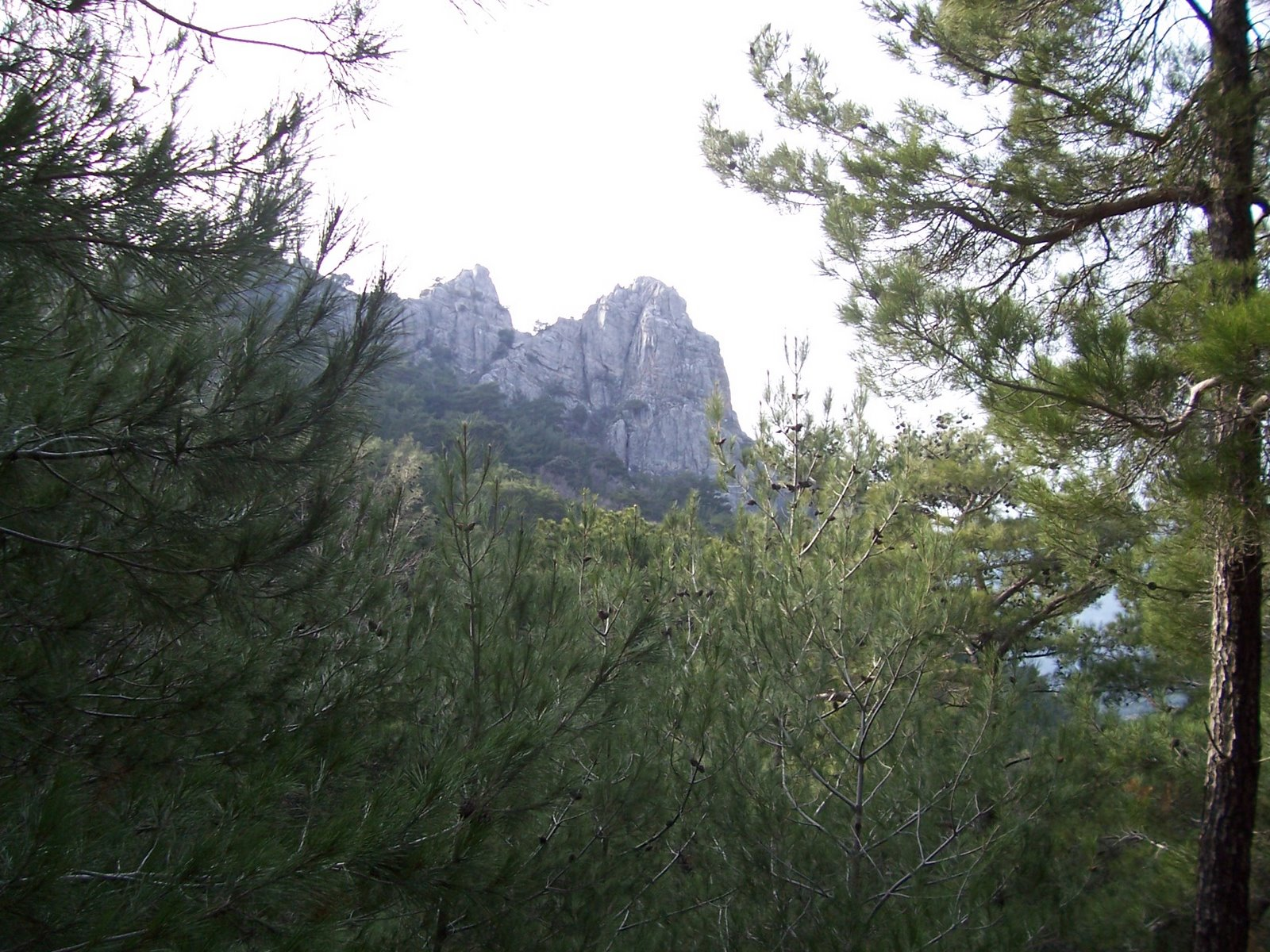
Summits of Mount Yamanlar

Mount Yamanlar was the location of the first recorded settlement which controlled the Gulf of İzmir circa 1440 BC, founded by Tantalus and possibly named "Naulochon", deriving its wealth from the mines of the region.

On the steep southeastern slopes of the mountain, there is a "Tomb of Tantalus" dating from this very early period in Anatolian history. This tomb was explored by Charles Texier in 1835, while other schools place Tantalus's tomb, as well as the lake associated with his story, to other localities found on Mount Sipylus. The first location of Smyrna (Old Smyrna) was also at the foot of Mount Yamanlar on what was at the time a small peninsula.

== Recent past ==
The same Bayraklı slopes was also where landslides caused by flash floods that had occurred on 3–4 November 1995 had claimed at least 61 lives in the slum-type residences that had mushroomed at the time in the area, and had caused material damage exceeding 50 million US Dollars. Incidents of a similar nature occurred also in autumn 2001 adding five more casualties to İzmir's toll of disaster victims. A better planned and managed urbanization along the silted slopes of the mountain, by preserving its historic heritage at the same time, is an ongoing concern for the city as a whole.

== Books ==
- Ekrem Akurgal (2002). Ancient Civilizations and Ruins of Turkey: From Prehistoric Times Until the End of the Roman Empire. Kegan Paul. ISBN 0-7103-0776-4.
- Cecil John Cadoux (1938). Ancient Smyrna: A History of the City from the Earliest Times to 324 A.D. Blackwell Publishing.
- George E. Bean (1967). Aegean Turkey: An archaeological guide. Ernest Benn, London. ISBN 978-0-510-03200-5.
