= Naulochon =

Port town in Aeolis

Coordinates: 38°27′52″N 27°10′16″E

Naulochon (Ancient Greek: Ναύλοχον), also known as Palaea Smyrna or Palaia Smyrna (Παλαιά Σμύρνη; meaning 'Old Smyrna'), was a port town of ancient Aeolis, and the original Aeolian settlement of Smyrna.

Its site is located in Bayraklı, Asiatic Turkey.

According to community website Pleiades, archaeological evidence from Naulochon dates back to the eleventh or tenth centuries B.C.
