= Karşıyaka =

- District and municipality
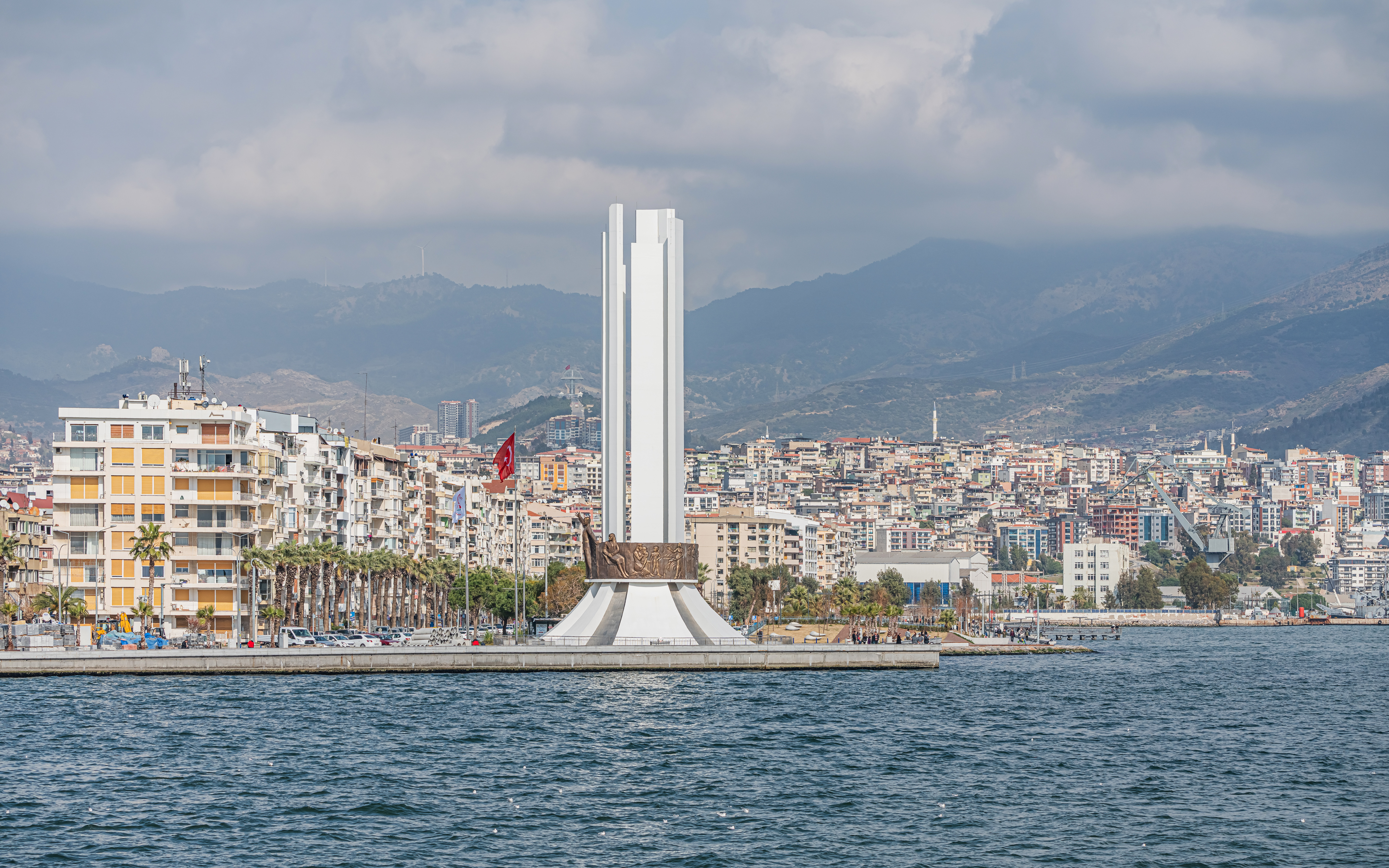
- Seashore of Karşıyaka

- Map showing Karşıyaka District in İzmir Province

- Location within Turkey Location within İzmir
- Coordinates: 38°27′34″N 27°06′55″E
- Country: Turkey
- Province: İzmir

Government
  - Mayor: Behice Yıldız İşçimenler Ünsal (CHP)
- Area: 51 km^{2} (20 sq mi)
- Population (2022): 346,264
  - Density: 6,800/km^{2} (18,000/sq mi)
- Time zone: UTC+3 (TRT)
- Area code: 0232
- Website: www.karsiyaka.bel.tr

Karşıyaka (Turkish: [kaɾʃɯˈjaka]) is a municipality and district of İzmir Province, Turkey. Its area is 51 km^{2}, and its population is 346,264 (2022). The district extends for twelve kilometres along the northern and eastern coastline of the tip of the Gulf of İzmir. Its centre is at a distance of 6 km (4 mi) to the north from the traditional centre of İzmir, which is Konak Square in Konak at the opposite coast. Karşıyaka's district area neighbours the district areas of Menemen to the north, Bornova to the east and Çiğli to the west. Besides being an active venue of commerce, culture and educational activities and tourism, Karşıyaka also has an urban culture centred on the sports club Karşıyaka SK, which commands a large and passionate fan base.

== Geology ==
Late created formations around İzmir consist of sandstone, shale and limestone blocks some of which may be larger than several kilometers. Such formations which are generally observed on hills around the region, are the main reasons for resistance on the hills. In addition to these, the community of neogen age can easily be estimated through the andesitic compounds of volcanic origin, around Mount Yamanlar. Such units can be listed as silicon, aluminum, sodium, lava with magnesium content, tuff and tuff stuffed lava agglomerates. The lava also contains reddish brown and greenish gray large feldspar crystals. Neogen sedimentary rocks are made up of clay stone, sandstone and pebble stones at dept while being made up only of limestone on the top. At some places clay stone is observed on limestone layers. It is possible to say that ground resistance is satisfactory in regions covered with limestone on top, while ground resistance is low in regions which has thin layers of limestone intercalated with mud rocks.

== Climate and environment ==
Karşıyaka bears the general characteristics of the Mediterranean climate zone. It is rainy in winter and hot in summer. As it is the case for İzmir's entire coastline, Karşıyaka benefits on a daily basis from the north-west wind called "imbat", because of which ships in the Gulf of İzmir will always be anchored in a northwest–southeast position, and which cools the city during summer days.

== Location ==
The industrial zone bringing together principally firms of local-scale, exception made of the notable presence of Alaybey shipyard are located in the eastern part of Karşıyaka. The same eastern corner also covers a zone of sparse settlement around the locality called Soğukkuyu, originally a seaside village of semi-nomadic Turkmens (Yörüks) made to settle here in the 19th century, and to the north is a large forest area. Karşıyaka's centre is connected to İzmir's centre by a busy schedule of railways, roads, and commuter ferries, works for the extension of İzmir's underground line to Karşıyaka currently being carried out at a rapid pace, and there are also good road links to Menemen and Aliağa to the north, to reach Çanakkale in north-west Turkey, and beyond. Originally a hamlet, then a remote suburb of İzmir in the 19th century, Karşıyaka became much larger and grew in stature in the 1960s when its waterfront developed as a prosperous residential neighbourhood.

== Sport ==
Karşıyaka S.K. is the sports club of Karşıyaka. It is also called "KSK", and locally as Kaf Sin Kaf, following the initials in Arabic script since the club's past dates back to Ottoman times. The club has a large and very passionate fan base. Karşıyaka supporters like to call the club "The 35 and a half", to differentiate themselves from İzmir that license plate number is 35. Although its football team is presently in the fourth level of the Turkish football league system mainly due to financial problems that the club has faced over recent years, Karşıyaka S.K.'s basketball and volleyball branches, known respectively as Pınar Karşıyaka (by the name of their sponsors) and Karşıyaka Women's Volleyball Team, are leading contenders in their fields. Pınar Karşıyaka has won twice Turkish League, twice Turkish President's Cup and a Turkish Cup. Karşıyaka have a fierce rivalry with Göztepe.

== Economy ==
Karşıyaka is deeply associated with commerce, construction of residences, education and literature, and is a prized area for pensioners, not only in the scale of İzmir but also from across Turkey as a whole. A total of 220,000 residences make up the urban area and the average yearly increase of the district population is 2.3 per cent. The district area having been almost entirely built up, Karşıyaka today acts principally as a residential centre for the workforce of İzmir's industry and services, who generally commute for work to neighbouring Çiğli and Bornova, Alsancak across the gulf, or even to locations further afield like Kemalpaşa and Manisa. The share of agriculture and industry in its economy is in constant decrease, while Karşıyaka's tourism potential remains an open field.

The waterfront is the wealthier part of Karşıyaka and it is here that residents of long date are generally concentrated. The neighbourhoods located along the slopes are poorer, with slum-type residences in parts, and these continue receiving flows of immigration, especially from Turkey's Eastern Anatolia region. The district counts a total of 11,570 enterprises, 207 of which are identified as industrial firms, and 3,180 categorised under commerce. Nine industrial companies have full or partial foreign capital and 143 commercial establishments in Karşıyaka are registered exporters. There are eighteen banks providing services through 61 branches in Karşıyaka, and a handful of hotels with a total bed capacity of 180. There is one teacher for 24 students and one doctor for 1,127 patients overall. The literacy rate is very high at 92 per cent. An environment of urban consciousness also favoured the foundation of a high number of professional organisations in varied fields in Karşıyaka, ranging from trade (such as KASİAD, BESİAD, BOGİAD) to education, usually centred on teachers or alumni of the district's rooted institutions.

== History and sights of interest ==
Traces of the earliest phases of the timeline of İzmir, such as "The Tomb of Tantalus" and "Old Smyrna" are located at a stone's throw from Karşıyaka, in the very recently constituted metropolitan district of Bayraklı, which was formerly within the boundaries of the district of Karşıyaka.

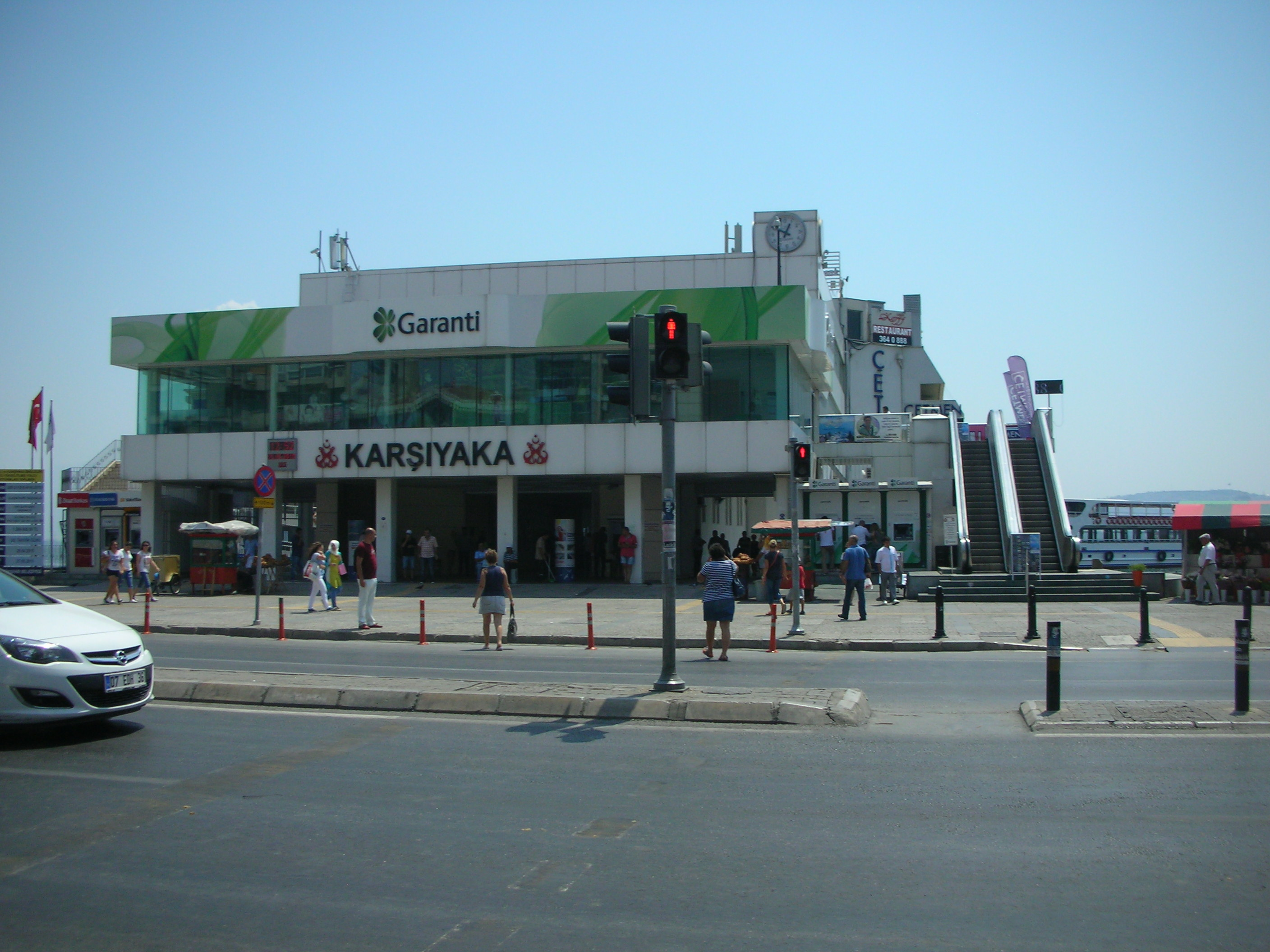
Karşıyaka Pier in 2015

Karşıyaka was described in frequent terms of admiration by travellers who visited İzmir, and they could not help but mention in detail the dense forests of Mount Yamanlar, reaching as far as the coast, and the gardens and orchards which garnish the shoreline and along the beds of its four streams, namely Ahırkuyu, Serinkuyu, Laka and Bornova. Named Karşıyaka (literally "the opposite shore") in Turkish since the 11th century, the locality was alternatively called Cordelio or Cordelieu or Kordelio (Κορδελιό) in European or Greek sources until the beginning of the 20th century. These names were supposed to make reference to Richard the Lionheart (Coeur de Lion), who is not attested to have come to these waters in person, but it was usually claimed that the area was named in the 1190s by a contingent of Crusaders of the Third Crusade who was accosted here and had named it in honour of Europe's most famed soldier of the time. This explanation of the name is disputed, some sources taking as point of departure the mention of the name (in the form "Kordeleon") in Byzantine documents of the 14th century and questioning whether the name Cordelio is the continuation of a more ancient settlement yet unexplored, as is most of ancient Aeolia.

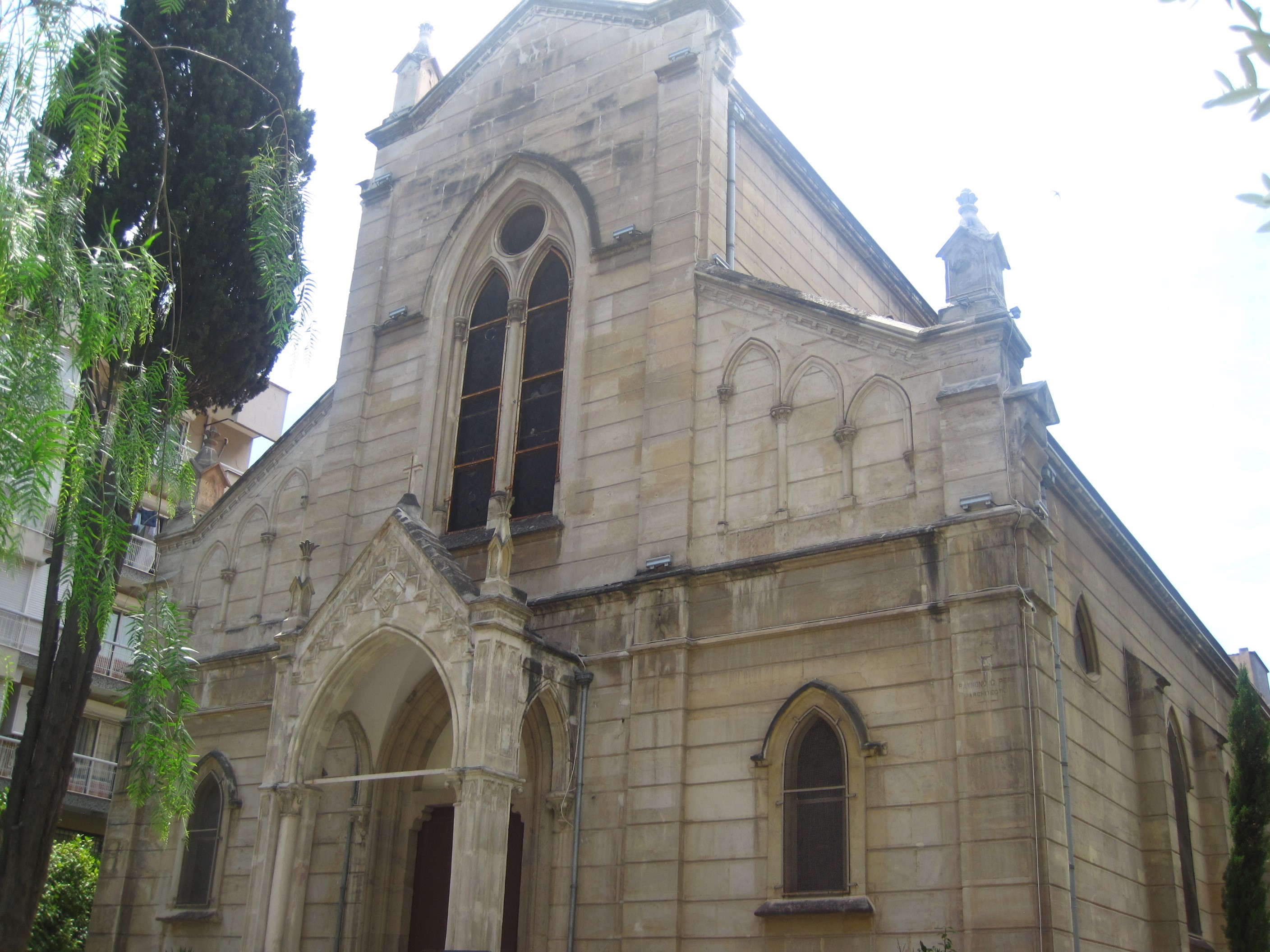
St. Helena Church in Karşıyaka

Still very leafy and lush generally despite intensive construction of medium- to high-rise apartments and office buildings in recent decades, Karşıyaka grew in size after the entry into service of İzmir-Menemen railroad in 1865, and the start of urban ferry services in 1874 by a British company under an Ottoman imperial lease accorded by Abdülhamid II and named "Hamidiye" for this reason. A second shipping company put two other ferries in service starting 1880, followed in 1884 by a third company. Very rapidly, it became fashionable for European and Levantine inhabitants of İzmir, concentrated in Bornova and Buca until then, to build or purchase houses in Karşıyaka particularly for the dowry of their daughters, which contributed to the growing popularity among the rich of the gulf's northern shores.

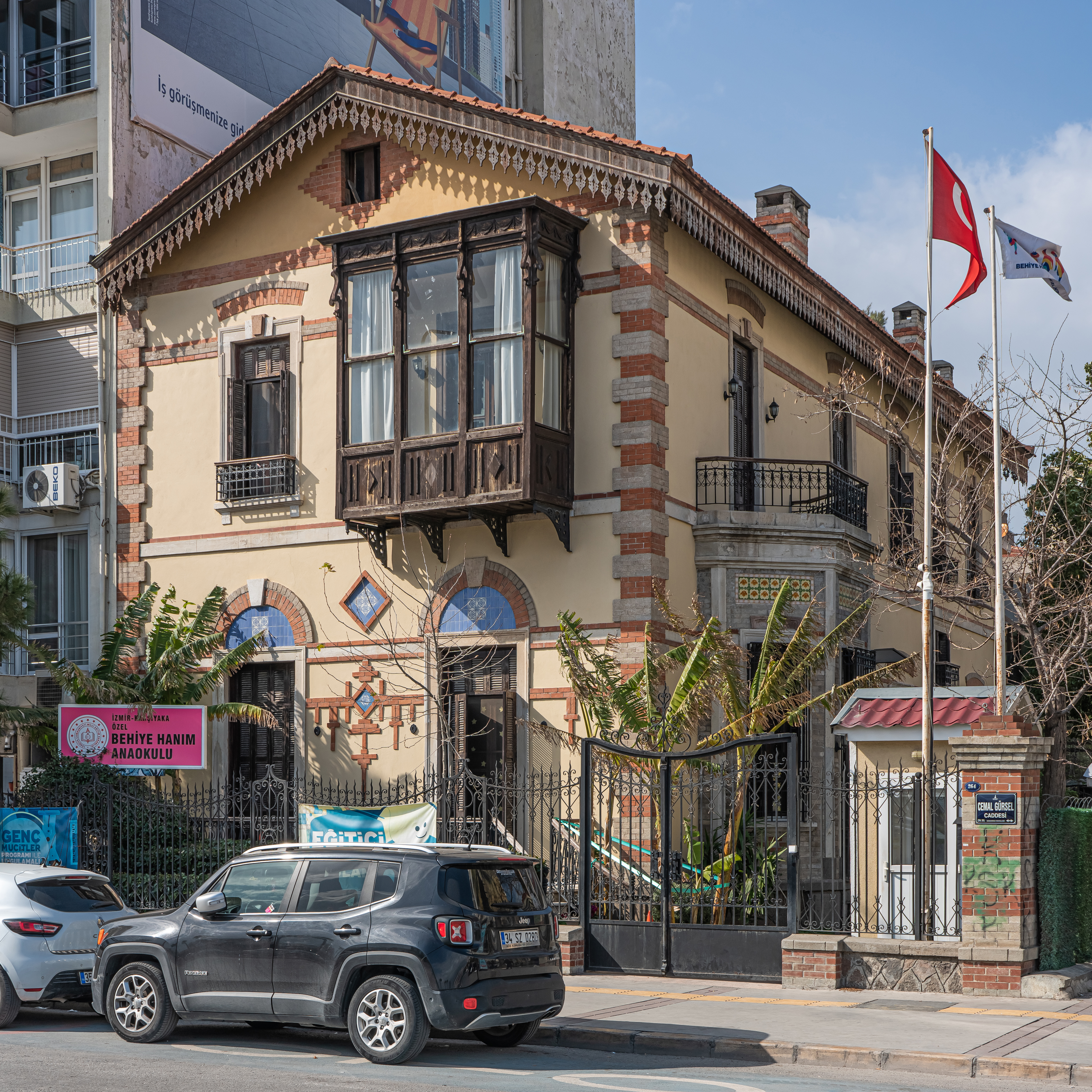
Levantine-built Loehner Mansion in Karşıyaka

In pace with its resort-like atmosphere, Karşıyaka saw a number of Ottoman konaks or Levantine mansions erected within its boundaries, especially along the shoreline and serving as secondary residence. Luxury multi-storey residences at immediate seaside quickly rose next to modest inner quartiers around the train station where the working class was concentrated and the Turkish village of Soğukkuyu The commuting movements and the way of life of İzmir's inhabitants were profoundly changed since then with Karşıyaka becoming part of the urban fabric.

By the time of the 1891 census, Karşıyaka had already acquired the appearance of a large township with 832 houses and a permanent population of 1080. A sizable Turkish population settled in Karşıyaka's Soğukkuyu some time before that date and that area is still distinguished by its rustic houses in the middle of the urban zone. In the meantime, the former village of Papa Scala or Papazkale or Papazköyü or Papaz İskelesi (Priest's quay) to the west came to be known as Bostanlı, in reference to melons and watermelons from Menemen which were discharged and loaded on ships here.

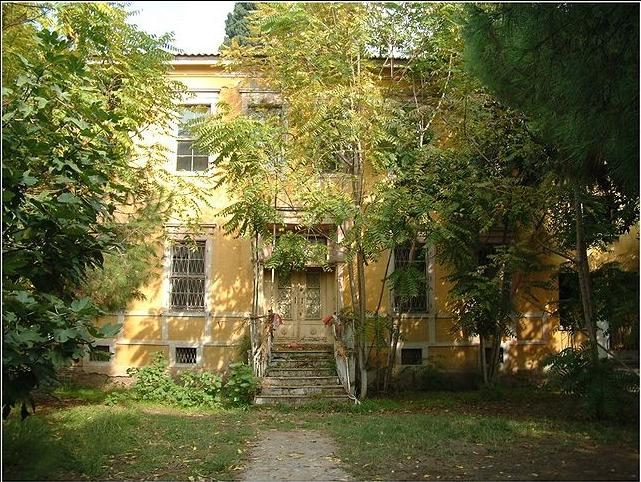
House of Latife Hanım (Atatürk's wife) in Karşıyaka, prior to its restoration (2006)

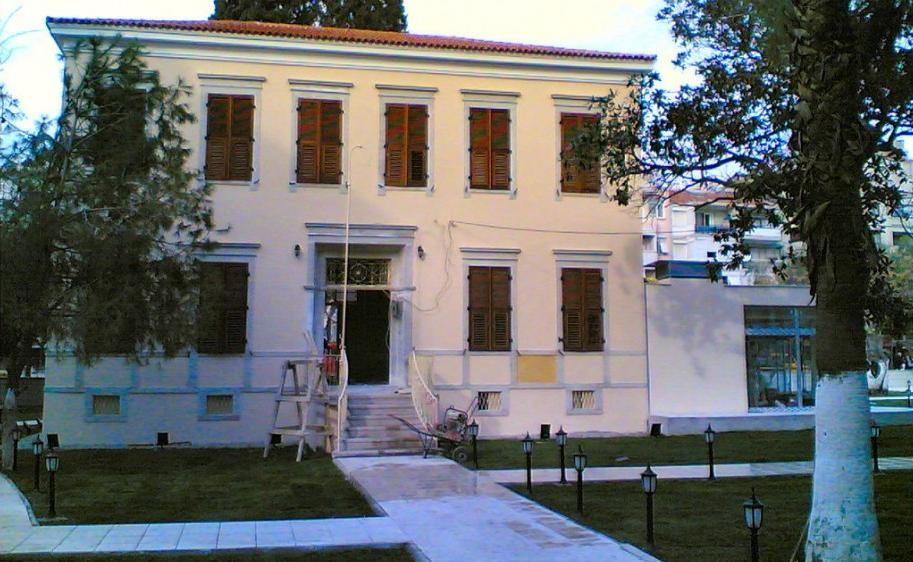
Latife Hanım House after having been restored by the municipality (2008)

The four most important reminders of the Levantine heritage still intact in Karşıyaka are the Alliotti, Penetti, Van Der Zee, and Löhner houses. The first was built by a prominent Levantine family of Italian origins in 1914 and was exchanged in the 1920s against property belonging to Durmuş Yaşar, the founder of Yaşar Holding. The mansion is known today under Yaşar's name and serves as a vocational training centre. The last two have recently been restored; the first floor of the Van Der Zee mansion has been put to public use by the municipality in the form of a café (Eski Ev Cafe).

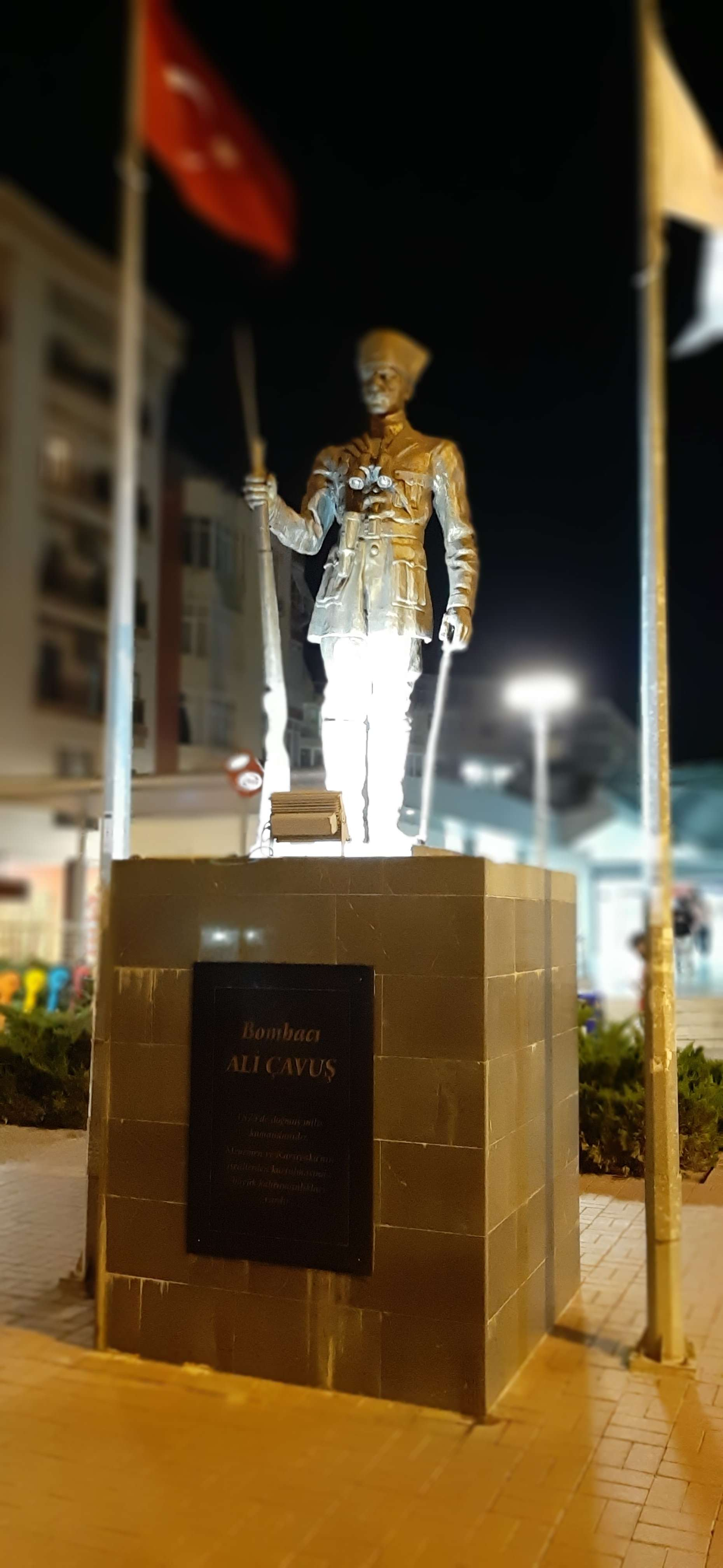
Monument of Grenadier-Sergeant Ali Çavuş in Alaybey Station, a Cretan-Turk within the vanguard of the 14th Cavalry Division which liberated Karşıyaka on 9 September 1922.

There is also a 1904-built Catholic Church (Saint Helen church) that served a community of about 200 families and which is recently restored. Edouard Balladur, the former Prime Minister of France, notably, was baptised there.

There are also more modest but still lovely little houses, characterised by their engaged front doors and narrow lines, termed as "Sakız houses", and which are highly typical of the region surrounding İzmir.

Karşıyaka is also where Zübeyde Hanım, Atatürk's mother, spent her last days in end-1922 and January 1923, and is where she is buried. The house she died, which belonged to the family of Latife Uşşaki, Mustafa Kemal Pasha's wife, is restored and it is located right in the centre of the urban zone, near the main commercial street, Karşıyaka's famous Çarşı.

Atatürk's feelings and words about Karşıyaka: İzmir‘in Karşıyakalıları ... Sizi derin muhabbetle selamlarım ... Ben bütün İzmir’i ve bütün İzmirlileri severim. Güzel İzmir’in temiz kalpli insanlarının da beni sevdiklerine eminim. Yanlız bir rastlantı beni Karşıyaka’ya daha fazla bağlamıştır. Karşıyakalılar, annem sinenizde, sizin topraklarınızda yatıyor. Karşıyakalılar, İzmir’i gördüğüm gün öncelikle Karşıyaka’yı ve orada sizin Türk topraklarınızda yatan anamın mezarını gördüm.

== Administration ==
Karşıyaka is a stronghold of the social-democrats. Currently, the municipality is administered by Behice Yıldız Ünsal of the CHP (Republican People's Party).

=== Composition ===
There are 27 neighbourhoods in Karşıyaka District:

- Aksoy
- Alaybey
- Atakent
- Bahariye
- Bahçelievler
- Bahriye Üçok
- Bostanlı
- Cumhuriyet
- Dedebaşı
- Demirköprü
- Donanmacı
- Fikri Altay
- Goncalar
- İmbatlı
- İnönü
- Latife Hanım
- Mavişehir
- Mustafa Kemal
- Nergiz
- Örnekköy
- Sancaklı
- Şemikler
- Tersane
- Tuna
- Yalı
- Yamanlar
- Zübeyde Hanım

== International relations ==
Karşıyaka is twinned with:

- Kosovo, Prizren
- Piran, Slovenia (since 2013)

== Gallery ==
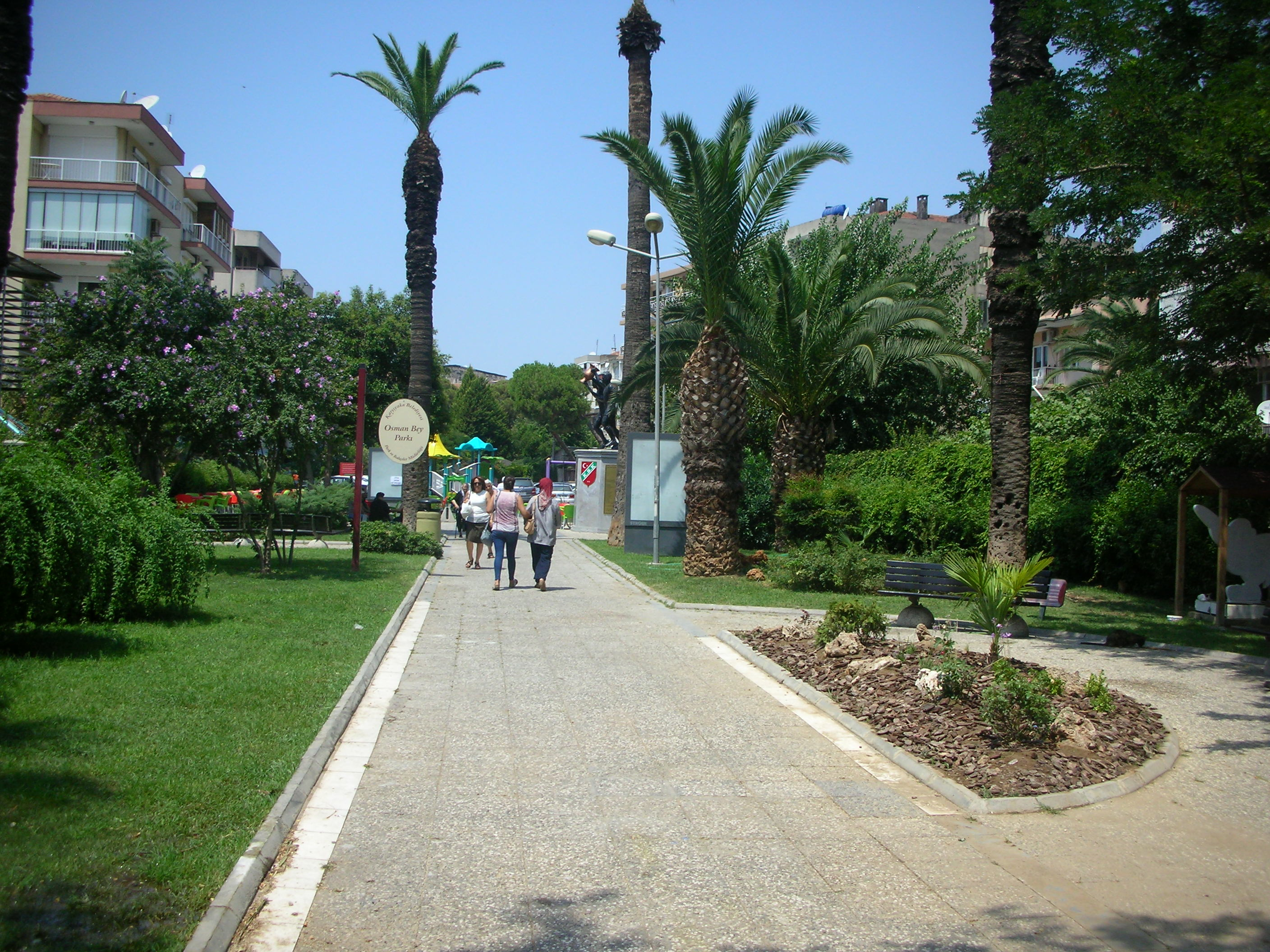
Osman Bey Park in Karşıyaka

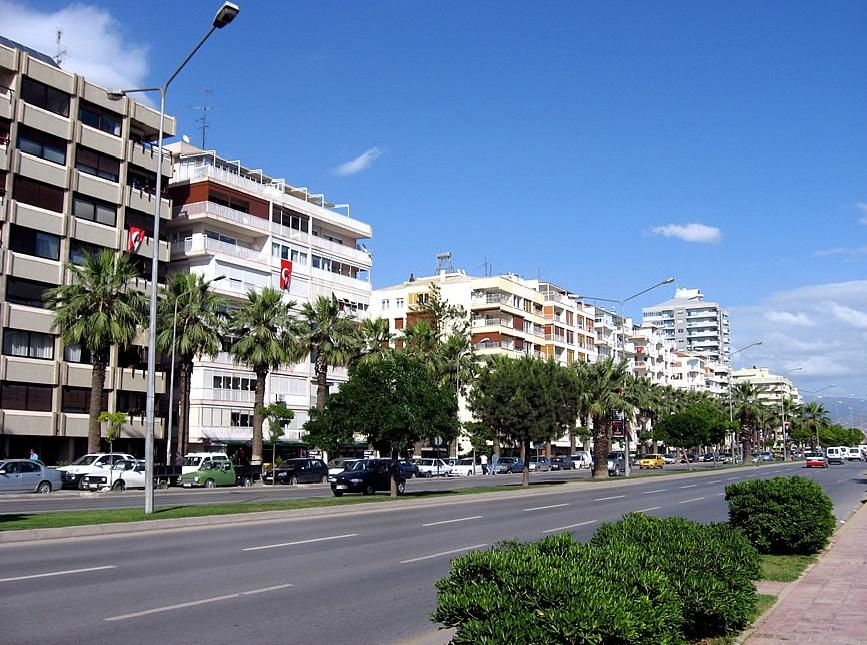
Typical residential buildings of the Karşıyaka neighbourhood

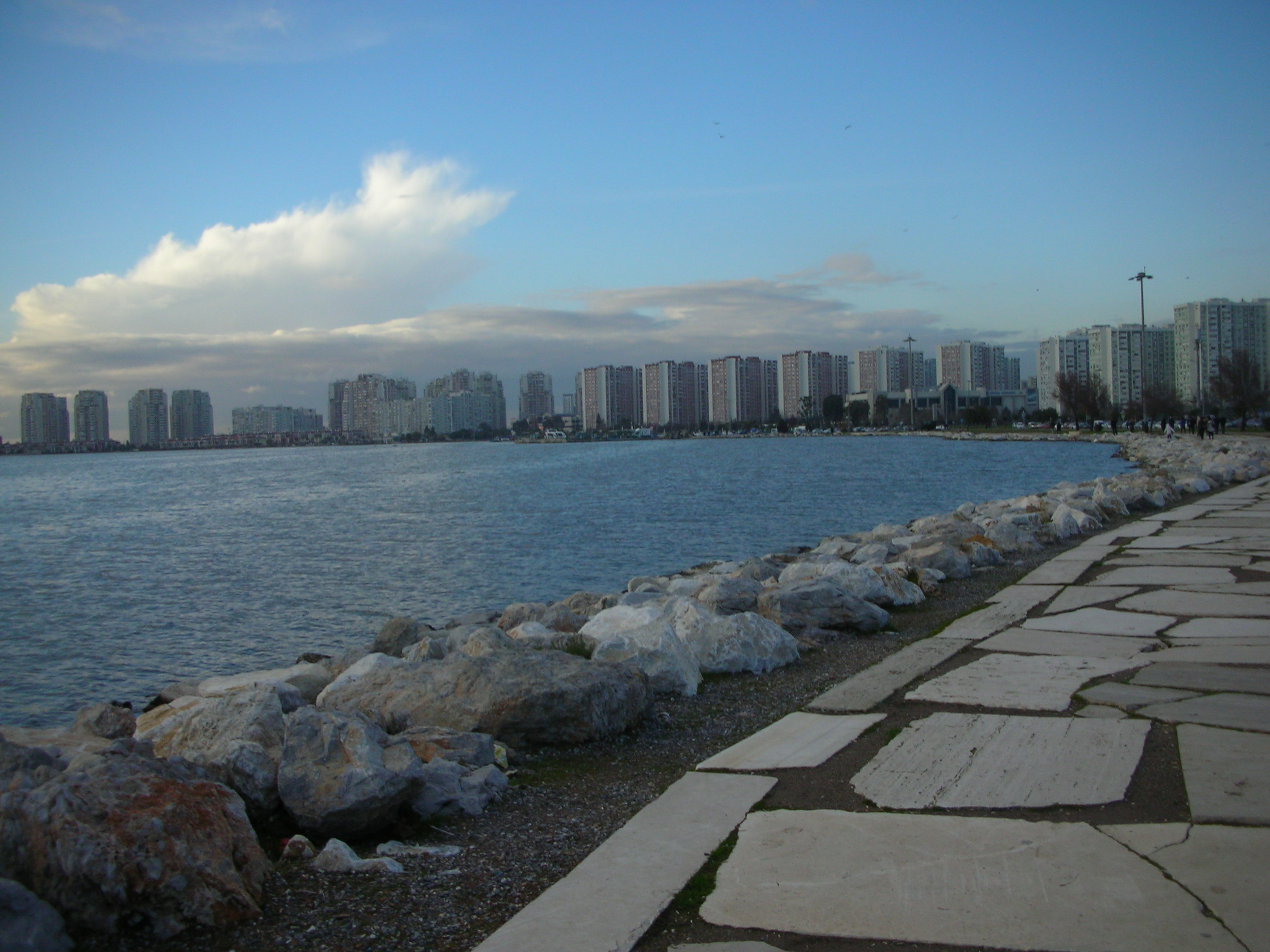
Buildings in Mavişehir from Bostanlı shore

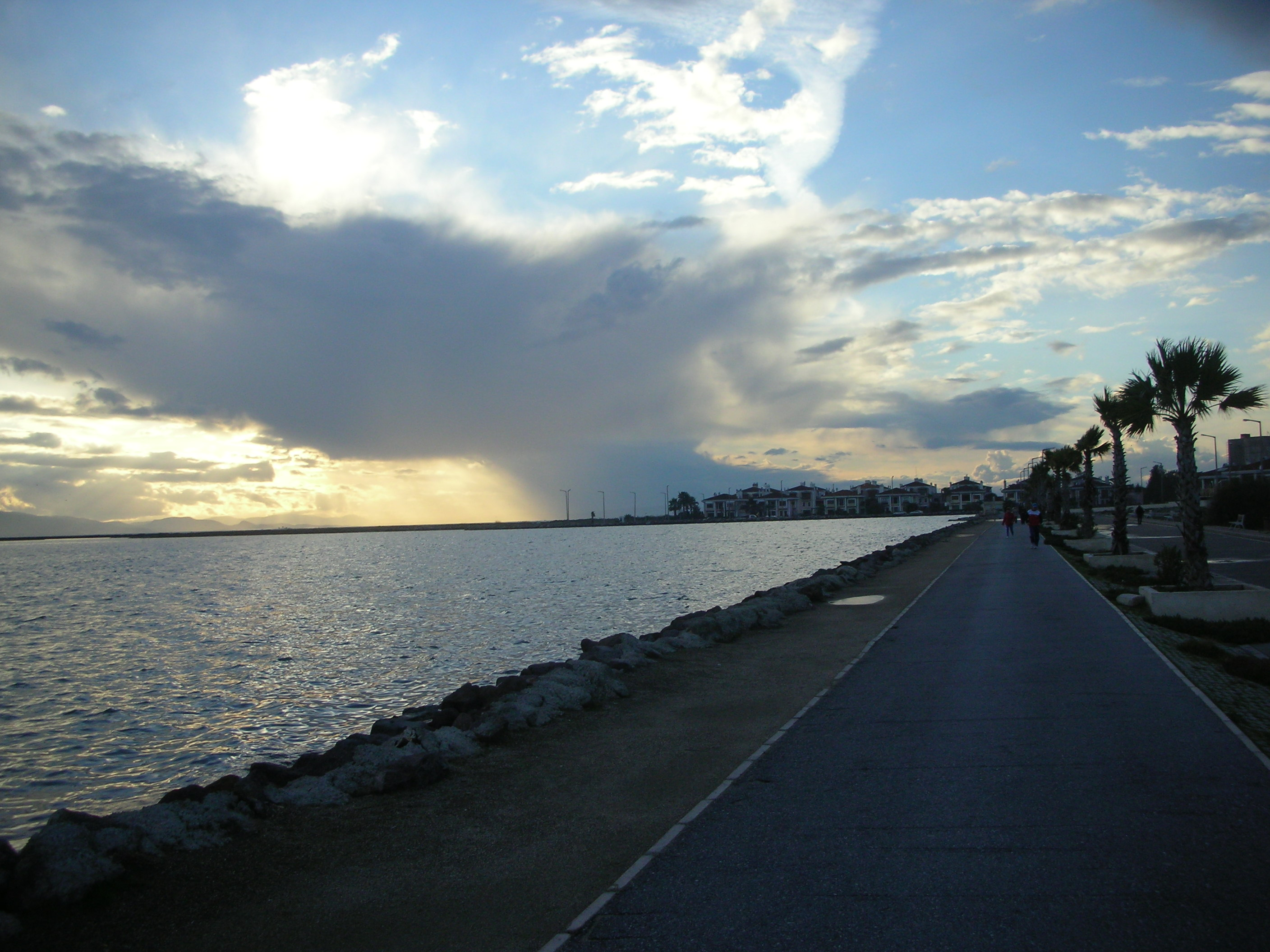
Mavişehir shore

== See also ==
- Karşıyaka Arena
