= List of suicide attacks in Turkey =

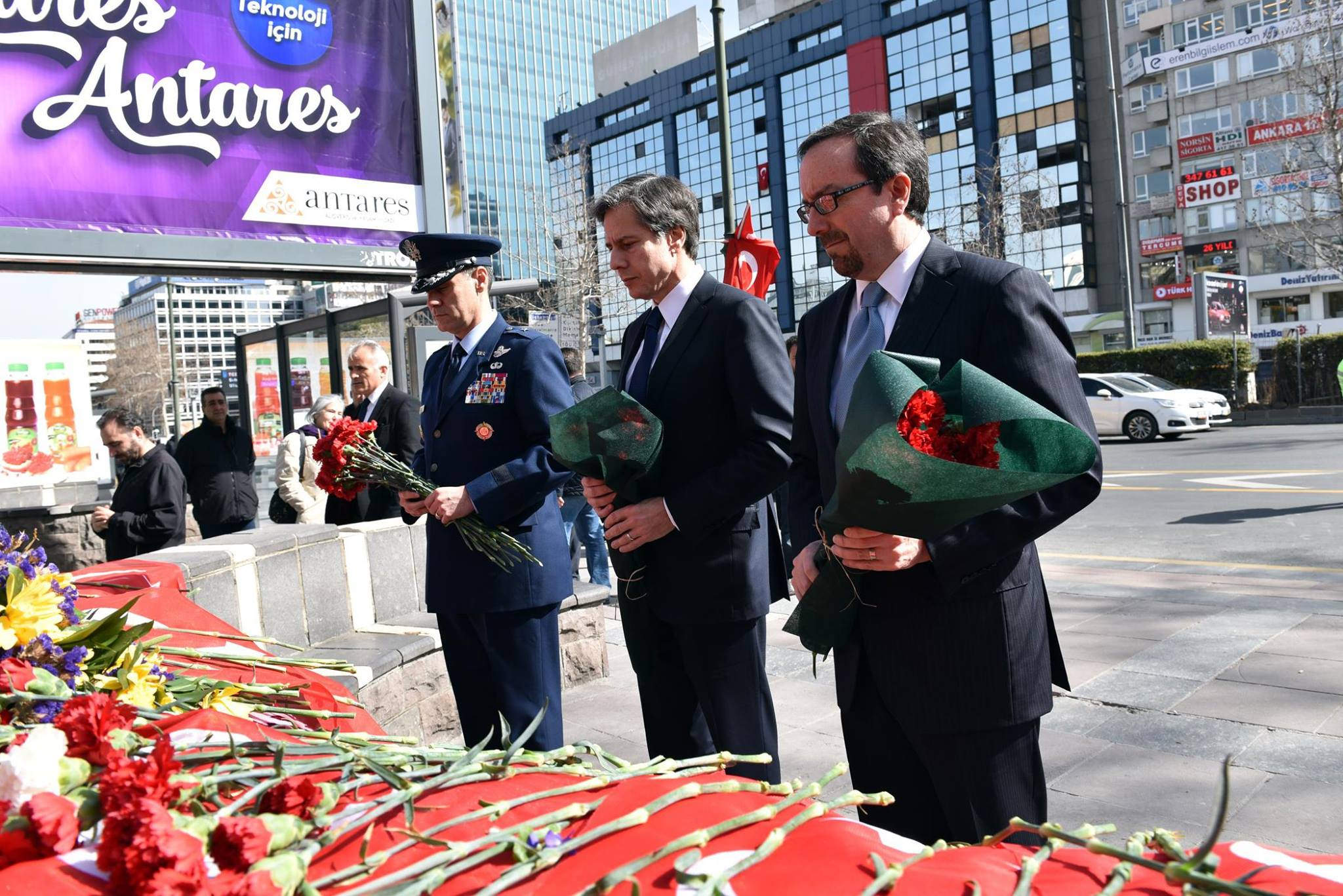
Defense Attaché Brigadier General Marc Sasseville, US Deputy Secretary of State Tony Blinken and US Ambassador to Ankara John R. Bass, leaving flowers where the March 2016 Ankara bombing took place

A total of 47 suicide attacks have occurred in Turkey, 24 of which were carried by PKK, 10 by the Islamic State of Iraq and the Levant, 6 by TAK, 4 by Revolutionary People's Liberation Party/Front, and 3 by Al-Qaeda's branch in Turkey. The assailants who carried out these attacks - except the one on 9 March 2003 and another on 25 May 2012 - all lost their lives, and a total of 593 people including 37 assailants were killed. 15 Suicide attacks have occurred in Istanbul, followed by 6 in Hakkâri, 5 in Ankara, 4 in Adana and Gaziantep, 3 in Van, 2 in Bingöl, Diyarbakır and Kayseri, and 1 in Ağrı, Antalya, Bursa, Elazığ, Sivas, Şanlıurfa, Şırnak and Tunceli. In addition to these attacks, a total of three attempted attacks, two by PKK and one by Revolutionary People's Liberation Party/Front, were not successfully carried out and the assailants lost their lives following the explosion of the explosives.

The first suicide attack in the country was carried out by the PKK in Tunceli on 30 June 1996. The attack targeting military personnel resulted in the death of 8 military personnel. On 25 October 1996, a civilian died in Adana for the first time in the second suicide attack carried out by the PKK that targeted the police. On 1 December 1998, for the first time, a place where civilians were concentrated was targeted in the attack organized by a PKK assailant on the market in Lice. In the attack organized by a PKK member in Van on 24 December 1998, for the first time a child died from such an attack in the country. While female assailants were used in the first 7 suicide attacks carried out by PKK members, male suicide attackers began to carry out attacks starting on 20 March 1999 with the attack in Başkale. The Revolutionary People's Liberation Party/Front organized its first suicide attack on 3 January 2001 in Istanbul. On 15 November 2003, Al-Qaeda organized its first suicide attack in the country, using bomb-laden vehicles on two separate targets in Istanbul and targeted places of worship for the first time. On 20 November, the same organization attacked two different targets in Istanbul using the same method, again with a few minutes apart. 28 people died in the first attack and 31 in the second one, making those attacks the deadliest suicide attacks in the country at that time. On 6 January 2015, a suicide attack was carried out in Istanbul by a person linked to the Islamic State of Iraq and the Levant. An assailant, who was affiliated with the same organization, killed 34 people in the attack on Suruç on 20 July 2015. On 10 October 2015, 109 people died in Ankara due to explosives detonated by two people at an interval of three seconds, and this event went down in history as the most fatal suicide attack in the history of the country. On 17 February 2016, a suicide attack was carried out in Ankara by TAK members for the first time. An airport in Turkey was targeted for the first time in the attack on Istanbul Atatürk Airport on 28 June 2016.

2016 was the year in which the most number of suicide attacks were carried out, with a total of 16 attacks. 318 were killed from the attacks in 2016, making it the year with the most number of fatalities.

== List of suicide attacks ==
Note: In all the attacks - except one attacker who survived the attack on 9 March 2003 and another on 25 May 2012 - the people who carried out the attacks lost their lives and are included the number of fatalities.

Date	Place of the Attack	Assailant(s)	Perpetrators	Fatalities	Injuries	Target	Reference
30 June 1996	Tunceli	Zeynep Kınacı	PKK	9	29	The explosion took place close to the sixty-person military unit gathered for the flag ceremony in the Republic Square in Tunceli, by the attacker who was in a maternity dress and detonated the explosives. All those who died in the attack were unarmed military band players with their musical instruments.	
25 October 1996	Adana	Leyla Kaplan	PKK	5	18	It was carried out when the attacker, who approached the Adana Riot Control Police Directorate, detonated the explosives she had with her. Policemen and a civilian were among those killed in the attack.	
29 October 1996	Sivas	Güler Otaş	PKK	6	10	Out of the three people who were taken to the Çarşı Police Station as suspects, the female attacker did not go through a complete search because the police officers at the station were on duty for the Republic Day celebrations. The female suspect, who was put on the vehicle provided by the Anti-Terrorism Branch together with one of the male suspects, detonated the bomb she had carried after the vehicle started to move. In the explosion, the police officers, the other suspect, and a civilian died.	
17 November 1998	Yüksekova	Fatma Özen	PKK	2	5	It was carried out when a woman approaching the military convoy waiting to go to Van in front of the Gendarmerie Command detonated the explosives she was carrying. One soldier died in the attack.	
1 December 1998	Lice	Hüsniye Oruç	PKK	1	14	It was carried out when the attacker came to a market where soldiers and village guards were shopping, and detonated explosives.	
24 December 1998	Van	Hamdiye Kapan	PKK	2	24	The military service vehicle carrying high school students, who were the children of the military personnel, was about to move when the attacker approached the vehicle and detonated the explosives. The only person who died aside from the assailant was a student.	
4 March 1999	Istanbul	Maral Maymak	PKK	1	10	It was carried out by a woman with a suspicious attitude in front of the Martyr Keskin Kaplankıran Police Station. While the officers were trying to warn the citizens to get away from the scene, she detonated the explosives.	
20 March 1999	Başkale	Tacettin Şahin	PKK	1	3	It happened when the attacker, who was approaching the traffic crew at the regional traffic station, exploded the explosives.	
27 March 1999	Istanbul	Semiha Kılıç	PKK	1	10	It occurred in the Taksim Square, where the attacker approached a minibus occupied by the riot control police, and upon their reaction detonated the explosives.	
5 April 1999	Bingöl	Baki Tatlı	PKK	2	12	When Bingöl Governor, Süleyman Kamçı, got out of his car and headed for the governor's building, the attacker approached him which prompted Kamçı to run into the building. First the attacker threw the grenades into the vehicle and then towards building and then detonated the explosives that he was carrying. A child died in the attack.	
8 April 1999	Yüksekova	Turab Muhammedi	PKK	2	6	The attacker jumped in front of the car carrying Hakkâri Governor Nihat Canpolat, who was on a visit to Yüksekova, and detonated the explosives that he was carrying.	
5 July 1999	Seyhan	Ruşen Tarancalı	PKK	1	18	The incident occurred when the attacker approached the Seyhan District Gendarmerie Command order and detonating explosives. Civilians were injured in the attack, as well as members of the police force.	
3 January 2001	Istanbul	Gültekin Koç	Revolutionary People's Liberation Party/Front	2	7	The attacker entered the Şişli District Police Department by introducing himself as a businessman. On his way to the District Police Chief Selçuk Tanrıverdi's room, he was stopped by Tanrıverdi's driver on the fourth floor, which made him panicked and prompted him to detonate the explosives on him. A civilian died in the explosion.	
10 September 2001	Istanbul	Uğur Bülbül	Revolutionary People's Liberation Party/Front	4	23	It occurred when the attacker who was among the policemen at the checkpoint in Gümüşsuyu district of Beyoğlu district detonated the explosives. As a result of the attack, the police officers as well as a civilian died.	
9 March 2003	Istanbul	Engin Vural; Nihat Doğruel	Al-Qaeda's Turkey branch	2	6	The incident occurred at the Great Lodge of Free and Accepted Masons in Kartal when the attackers who entered the building injured the security guard and exploded the explosives on them. Out of the attackers, only Vural survived the explosion, while all the dead and injured were civilians.	
15 November 2003	Istanbul	Mesut Çabuk; Gökhan Elaltuntaş	Al-Qaeda's Turkey branch	28	300+	It was carried out by detonating trucks loaded with bombs in front of the Bet Israel Synagogue in Şişli, and in front of the Neve Shalom Synagogue in Beyoğlu, approximately four minutes apart.	
20 November 2003	Istanbul	Feridun Uğurlu; İlyas Kuncak	Al-Qaeda's Turkey branch	31	450+	It happened by the explosion of a truck loaded with bombs in front of the British Consulate General in Istanbul in Beyoğlu, and approximately five minutes later in front of the HSBC Headquarters building in Beşiktaş.	
9 March 2006	Van	Devrim Solduk	PKK	3	19	As a vehicle belonging to the police teams of Van Municipality was passing by, the attacker approached it and detonated the explosives. A police officer and a civilian died in the attack.	
22 May 2007	Ankara	Güven Akkuş	TAK	9	110+	It was carried out in the Anafartalar Bazaar, located in Ulus, Altındağ, when the attacker detonating the explosives on he was carrying. All those who died in the attack were civilians.	
31 October 2010	Istanbul	Vedat Acar	PKK	1	32	The attack occurred when the assailant approached the riot control police officers who were located at Taksim Square and detonated explosives.	
30 September 2011	Kemer	Not disclosed	PKK	1	2	The incident occurred when the attacker approached the gendarmerie security checkpoint in Göynük and detonated explosives.	
29 October 2011	Bingöl	Nazlı Görer	PKK	4	20	The attack targeted a stadium prepared for the Republic Day celebrations in Bingöl that was also close to the provincial building of the Justice and Development Party. While all those who died in the explosion were civilians, military personnel were among the injured.	
25 May 2012	Pınarbaşı	Cengiz Özek; Ramazan Yılmaz	PKK	2^{[A]}	16	After the vehicles they used were followed by the police, the attackers, who deviated from their targets, went towards Kayseri's Pınarbaşı district and entered the Pınarbaşı Police Headquarters. There, one of the attackers and a police officer died in the clash with the police. The other attacker carried out a suicide attack by detonating explosives in the vehicle.	
5 August 2012	Çukurca	Not disclosed	PKK	1	15-	Armed attacks were carried out on the Liveli Gendarmerie Station in the Çukurca district of Hakkari. An attacker who went to the police station during the clashes carried out a suicide attack by detonating the explosives on him.	
11 September 2012	Istanbul	İbrahim Çuhadar	Revolutionary People's Liberation Party/Front	2	7	It was carried out when a person who came to the 75th Anniversary Police Station in Sultangazi district tried to enter the police station but could not get inside when the police blocked him. He then detonated the explosives at the entrance of the police station. A police officer died in the attack.	
1 February 2013	Ankara	Ecevit Şanlı	Revolutionary People's Liberation Party/Front	2	3	The attacker used a grenade and detonated explosives while trying to enter through the gate of the visitors and visa applicants of the United States Embassy in the Kavaklıdere district of Çankaya. A security guard died in the explosion.	
6 January 2015	Istanbul	Diana Ramazova	Islamic State of Iraq and the Levant	2	1	The attack occurred when the assailant who was wearing a çarşaf entered the hut in front of the Istanbul Police Department Tourism Branch Directorate in the Sultanahmet district of Fatih and said that she had lost her wallet in English. A police officer died in the explosion.	
20 July 2015	Suruç	Şeyh Abdurrahman Alagöz	Islamic State of Iraq and the Levant	34	100+	It happened when members of the Socialist Party of the Oppressed (ESP) Youth Wing and the Socialist Youth Associations Federation (SGDF), who were university students were giving a press statement outside the Amara Culture Centre on their planned trip to reconstruct the Syrian border town of Kobanî. All those who died in the attack were civilians.	
2 August 2015	Doğubayazıt	Murat Bütün	PKK	3	31	It was carried out when the attacker approached the Karabulak Gendarmerie Station in Doğubayazıt district of Ağrı with two tractors loaded with explosives. While those who died in the attack were military personnel, civilians were among the injured.	
10 October 2015	Ankara	Yunus Emre Alagöz and another unnamed assailant^{[B]}	Islamic State of Iraq and the Levant	109	500+	Before the Labor, Peace and Democracy Rally that was due to be held in Sıhhiye Square, participants gathered at the Ankara railway station junction in the Ulus district of Altındağ. The two attackers detonated the explosives on themselves 3 seconds apart from one another. All those who died in the explosions were civilians.	
15 November 2015	Gaziantep	Halil İbrahim Durgun	Islamic State of Iraq and the Levant	1	5	In Gaziantep, an operation was carried out by the security units in the cell house, which was determined to be used by members of the Islamic State of Iraq and the Levant. The suspect at the house detonated explosives upon being caught. All of the injured were police officers.	
12 January 2016	Istanbul	Nebil Fadli	Islamic State of Iraq and the Levant	11	15	It was carried out in the Sultanahmet Square in Fatih, when the attacker detonated the bomb. All those who died in the explosion were civilians.	
17 February 2016	Ankara	Abdulbaki Sömer	TAK	29	61	It occurred by detonating a bomb loaded vehicle approaching the military service vehicles in Çankaya. Besides the military personnel, a civilian died in the explosion.	
13 March 2016	Ankara	Seher Çağla Demir	TAK	38	120+	It happened when a car loaded with bombs passing in front of the bus stops next to Güven Park in Kızılay Square exploded. 37 people and 1 police officer died in the explosion.	
19 March 2016	Istanbul	Mehmet Öztürk	Islamic State of Iraq and the Levant	5	36	It was carried out when an attacker detonated explosives on İstiklal Avenue. All those who died in the explosion were civilians.	
28 April 2016	Bursa	Eser Çali	TAK	1	13	It was carried out by the assailant detonating an explosive near the Grand Mosque of Bursa. No one died except the attacker.	
1 May 2016	Gaziantep	İsmail Güneş	Islamic State of Iraq and the Levant	4	23	It occurred in front of the Gaziantep Police Headquarters in Şehitkamil district, by detonating the vehicle loaded with bombs. All those who died in the attack were the police.	
7 June 2016	Istanbul	Eylem Yaşa	TAK	13	36	The attack was organized with a bomb-laden vehicle for the Agile Force team who went to Istanbul University Faculty of Letters in the Vezneciler district of Fatih for a change of guard. 5 police officers and 7 civilians lost their lives in the attack.	
28 June 2016	Istanbul	Rakim Bulgarov; Vadim Osmanov and another unnamed assailant	Islamic State of Iraq and the Levant	45	236	An armed attack and a suicide bomb attack were carried out simultaneously at the international terminal and parking lot at Istanbul Atatürk Airport in Bakırköy.	
18 August 2016	Elazığ	Çekdar Mahir Serbest	PKK	6	210+	It was arranged by detonating the vehicle loaded with bombs coming to the Elazığ Police Department.	
20 August 2016	Gaziantep	Unnamed assailant	Islamic State of Iraq and the Levant	57	90+	During a wedding in Şahinbey district, the attacker detonated the explosives on him.	
26 August 2016	Cizre	Mustafa Aslan	PKK	13	78	The attackers approached the street where the Cizre District Police Department and Riot Control Police Department buildings are located with an explosive-loaded truck. They were intervened at the police checkpoint where the conflict broke out. The attackers detonated a bomb-laden vehicle when they could not cross the checkpoint, which was about 50 meters from the police buildings.	
9 October 2016	Şemdinli	Mümin Aras	PKK	17	26	It was carried out by detonating an explosive-laden van, which did not comply with the stop warning of the soldiers performing search and identity control at the road control point, 150 meters from the Durak 2nd Border Company on the Şemdinli-Yüksekova highway.	
16 October 2016	Gaziantep	Mehmet Kadir Cebael; Muhammed Şerif	Islamic State of Iraq and the Levant	5	13	During a raid by police units in a house in Şahinbey, the suspect detonated explosives. All those who died were police officers.	
4 November 2016	Diyarbakır	Kemal Hunres	TAK	12	100+	It was carried out by detonating a bomb-laden vehicle near the annex building of the Diyarbakır Provincial Police Department in Bağlar, where the Anti-Terrorism and Agile Force branch offices are located.	
10 December 2016	Istanbul	Kadri Kılınç; Burak Yavuz	TAK	49	150+	An explosive-laden vehicle was detonated using a remote control at the gathering point of riot control police units near Vodafone Park in Beşiktaş. About 45 seconds after this attack, police teams identified another suspect in Maçka Park. The explosion occurred once the attacker blew himself up. All those who died in the suicide attack were members of the police force.	
17 December 2016	Kayseri	Kasım Yıldırım Çakar	PKK	15	50+	Soldiers trained in the Kayseri Air Force Brigade in Melikgazi were abroad private buses when the explosion occurred. All those who died were soldiers.	
26 October 2020	İskenderun	Unnamed assailant	PKK	1	1+	Two people who ambushed Turkish security forces in Payas escaped to İskenderun, where they ambushed police forces again. One of them was shot dead by police and the other one detonated the bombs on himself, injuring a police officer and killing himself.	
1 October 2023	Ankara	Two unnamed assailants	PKK	3	2	Two people reportedly hijacked a vehicle in Kayseri and killed its driver before heading to Ankara, where one of them blew himself up in front of the Interior Ministry, injuring two police officers. The other attacker was shot and killed by police before he could detonate his explosives.	

By province
Province	No. of attacks
Istanbul	15
Hakkâri	6
Ankara	5
Adana	4
Gaziantep	4
Van	3
Bingöl	2
Diyarbakır	2
Kayseri	2
Ağrı	1
Antalya	1
Bursa	1
Hatay	1
Elazığ	1
Sivas	1
Şanlıurfa	1
Şırnak	1
Tunceli	1

By year
Year	No. of attacks	No. of deaths
1996	3	20
1998	3	5
1999	6	8
2001	2	6
2003	3	59
2004^{[C]}	0	2
2006	1	3
2007	1	9
2010	1	1
2011	2	5
2012	3	5
2013	1	2
2015	5	149
2016	16	318
2017^{[D]}	0	1
2019^{[D]}	0	1
2020	1	1

By organization
Perpetrators	No. of attacks	No. of fatalities
PKK	25	109
Islamic State of Iraq and the Levant	10	273
Revolutionary People's Liberation Party/Front	4	10
TAK	6	151
Al-Qaeda's Turkey branch	3	61

== Suicide attack attempts ==
Date	Location	Assailant(s)	Perpetrators	Fatalities	Injuries	Target	Reference
4 April 1999	Tunceli	Canan Akgün	PKK	1	-	The attacker, who was waiting in the Erdemli hamlet of the Güleç village of Tunceli and had time-adjusted explosives, detonated them in the open field after asking for a taxi.	
6 July 1999	Batman	Not disclosed	PKK	1	-	The attacker, who planned to carry out a suicide attack at the 10 April Police Station in Batman, detonated the explosives upon seeing the police.	
20 May 2003	Ankara	Şengül Akkurt	Revolutionary People's Liberation Party/Front	1	-	The woman made the attack in a cafe in the Kızılay neighborhood of Çankaya. After a civil police entered the cafe and went to the toilet, she accidentally detonated the bomb that she was carrying.	

== Notes ==
- A. $\neg$ It does not include an attacker and an officer who died in the clash before the explosion. Another attacker and a civilian died from the explosion.
- B. $\neg$ The identity of the second attacker was not disclosed by the official authorities, and at first, some claims were made that he was Ömer Deniz Dündar. Ömer Deniz Dündar's father, Mehmet Dündar, made a statement that his son reached him via Facebook and conveyed the message that he was okay. On 10 January 2016, according to the information received by Anadolu Agency correspondent from Ankara Chief Public Prosecutor's sources, the identity of the attacker was reported as a Syrian citizen named "E. U." In the news published in Milliyet on 15 April, it was stated that the name of the attacker was Ebu Usema.
- C. $\neg$ Although there were no suicide attacks in 2004, two people that were injured in the attacks that took place in Istanbul on 15 and 20 November 2003 died from their injuries in 2004.
- D. $\neg$ Two people who were fatally injured on 10 December 2016 due to the attack in Istanbul, lost their lives in 2017 and 2019 respectively.
