= List of suicide attacks =

List of suicide attacks may refer to:

- Suicide attack, general overview and major attacks
- List of suicide attacks in Turkey
- List of Palestinian suicide attacks
