= Gökdemir =

Gökdemir is a Turkish given name for males and a Turkish surname. It may refer to:

== Surname ==
- Ali Gökdemir (born 1991), Azerbaijani football player of Turkish descent
- Ayvaz Gökdemir (1942–2008), Turkish politician
- Emine Gökdemir (born 2003), Turkish female handball player
- Selim Gökdemir (born 1960), Turkish businessman
