= Gazi Quarter riots =

1995 riots in Turkey

1995 Gazi Quarter riots
- Date: 12–15 March 1995
- Location: Sultangazi, Ümraniye in Istanbul and Kızılay in Ankara, Turkey
- Caused by: Drive-by shootings, killing a religious leader and injuring 25
- Methods: Riot, urban guerrilla warfare

Parties
Alevi protesters DHKP/C; Marxist–Leninist Communist Party Communist Party of Turkey	Government of Turkey; General Directorate of Security; Riot Police; Police Special Operation Department; Gendarmerie General Command; JİTEM (alleged); Turkish Armed Forces (as of 14 March); Turkish Land Forces; Grey Wolves

Lead figures
İzzettin Doğan; Özlem Tunç; Hasan Ocak	Hayri Kozakçıoğlu; Governor of Istanbul; Mehmet Ağar; Chief of the General Directorate of Security; Necdet Menzir; Istanbul Chief of Police; Nahit Menteşe; Minister of the Interior; Col. Veli Küçük; Gendarmerie General Command; Recep Tayyip Erdoğan; Mayor of Istanbul

Casualties and losses
23 dead and 1,000+ wounded	over 400 wounded

The 1995 Gazi Quarter riots (Turkish: Gazi Mahallesi olayları) or 1995 Gazi Massacre (Turkish: Gazi Katliamı) were events that occurred in March 1995 at the Gazi Quarter, a working-class neighborhood in the then Gaziosmanpaşa district, today Sultangazi district, of Istanbul, Turkey, where mostly Alevis live. The riots began after drive-by shootings on several cafés at the same time, and spread over other places in Istanbul and also in Ankara in the next days. During the four-day unrest, 23 people were killed and more than 1,400 rioters and police were injured.

== Background ==
In the evening hours of March 12, 1995, three cafés and a cake shop were attacked at the same time with automatic rifles, fired by anonymous people from a passing taxicab. As a result of the attack, Dede Halil Kaya, a 61-year-old Alevi religious leader, was killed and 25 people were injured, five of them severely. The gunmen escaped unidentified after having murdered the cab driver by cutting his throat, and set the hijacked cab on fire.

== Unrest ==
The attacks triggered chaotic events. Right after the attack, a great number of Alevi residents of the Gazi Quarter gathered in front of the cemevi, and marched to the neighborhood's police station. One of the protesters, Mehmet Gündüz, was killed and many were injured as the police fired into the air to disperse the crowd. The violence continued all night long.

In the early hours of the next day, Alevis from various places of Istanbul came to the Gazi Quarter to join the protesters. A massive crowd counting tens of thousands marched again toward the police station and clashed with the police, which was reinforced with the Flying Squad and the Special Task Force upon the orders of Istanbul Police Chief Necdet Menzir. The crowd overrun the barriers set up by the security forces and came some 200 m (660 ft) close to the police station countering police fire by throwing stones. The heaviest fight took place as the rioters almost reached the station. The police shot targeted to the people. The arriving gendarmerie units placed themselves between the opponents. However, this escalated the situation. It was not possible to control the events after hours. Fifteen rioters were killed and a great number of people were injured, among them journalists.

The commander of the 6th Brigade sought negotiation with the protesters. The rioters demanded to send a delegation to the police station in order to make sure that no one was taken into custody. The commander agreed, and he selected also a young woman, Özlem Tunç, as a member of the delegation. Özlem Tunç entered the station with the delegates. After inspecting every room, they became confident that there were no one arrested. However, the police officers insulted the delegates. The policemen could only be stopped by the military commander from attacking the civilians.

On March 14, Hayri Kozakçıoğlu, the governor of Istanbul Province, imposed martial law over Gazi Quarter and the neighboring two quarters in order to maintain order and security. On the same day, 36 people were injured during the protests that took place at Kızılay, Ankara in reaction to the events at the Gazi Quarter.

On March 15, the riots spread to a neighborhood in the Ümraniye district of Istanbul, on the Anatolian part. Upon the death of five people and injury of more than twenty, martial law was extended also there. The province governor lifted the martial law over the region the next day due to reinstatement of order.

== Police brutality ==
In an interview published in the newspaper Özgür Gündem on March 12, 2008, Özlem Tunç revealed her experience of police misconduct during the event.

Following the inspection, she came out of the police station and climbed atop an armored security vehicle to address the masses. After she stepped down, Özlem Tunç was detained by two Flying Squad officials, and brought into a nearby café. There, she was badly tortured, hit in the face with a police baton, and kicked and trampled.

As she became faint, they took her out of the café. One officer pulled out his firearm and shot her in the head. She fell face down on the street. The police officer's colleague prevented a second shot at her. One policeman grabbed her by the hair, the other by the legs, and they dragged her onto the sidewalk. There, someone trampled on her back. In the belief that she was dead, they left her there lying on the pavement.

Tunç's body was picked up by the gendarmerie, and delivered to the police station, where she was thrown onto a pile of dead and injured people. Later, the corpses and the injured individuals were transferred to hospitals. She became unconscious in the ambulance, and was put in the hospital's morgue.

It was discovered in the morgue that she was still alive. She underwent surgery on her head and received therapy in the hospital in the following days. On her third day in the hospital, Prime Minister Tansu Çiller paid a visit to her.

Footage showing the moment she was dragged onto the sidewalk and trampled was broadcast on television. Newspapers published the photos taken during that action as well. The unnecessary force exhibited created intense indignation within the public.

Özlem Tunç received medical treatment in a private hospital for three years. Due to continuous police harassment, she moved away from Gazi Quarter to Sarıyer in the north. She returned years later.

=== Trial ===
Autopsy carried out on 17 corpses indicated that seven of them died by police bullets. The public prosecutor sued twenty police officers for exceeding the limits of necessarily self-defense. For security reasons, the place of trial was transferred from Eyüp in Istanbul to a court in the 1,100 km (680 mi) far away city of Trabzon on the northeastern Black Sea. Opened on September 11, 1995, the case lasted until March 3, 2000.

The court ruled two police officers guilty of murder, but acquitted the other 18 security officials of any wrongdoing. Adem Albayrak, seen in a footage shooting with an automatic rifle, was charged to 96 years in prison for murder of four persons. His penalty was reduced then to six years and eight months. Mehmet Gündoğan, who was recorded while shooting on to the masses, was initially sentenced to 48 years for killing two civilians. His charge was reduced to three years and nine months. The charges were postponed. The Supreme Court revoked the lower court's decision on the grounds that no clarity for murder existed. As the case was reopened at the court in Trabzon, families of the victims withdrew since they believed the state would whitewash himself anyway. The court convicted the two suspects with a penalty of four years and 32 months in total. The ultimate decision was approved by the Supreme Court on July 11, 2002.

=== Appeal to European Court of Human Rights ===
Following the notification of the ultimate court decision, the families of the 22 dead victims appealed to the European Court of Human Rights (ECtHR). The Court in Strasbourg charged on July 27, 2005 the Republic of Turkey with the payment of compensation in amount of €30,000 to each family of twelve victims in the Gazi Quarter and of five deads in the Ümraniye district, totaling to €510,000. The ECtHR found a violation of the European Convention on Human Rights's Article 2, which protects the right of every person to their life, and Article 13.

== Later investigation ==
=== Motion on parliamentary investigation ===
Gültan Kışanak, deputy of Diyarbakır from Peace and Democracy Party (BDP) and her 19 parliament member colleagues moved a motion on March 12, 2008, on the 13th anniversary of the 1995 Gazi Quarter riots, for the investigation of the events by the Turkish Grand National Assembly.

=== Ergenekon connection ===
The daily Sabah reported that during the further investigations in the case of Ergenekon trials, the public prosecutor discovered that Osman Gürbüz, a detainee suspected of membership in the alleged clandestine Ergenekon organization, was the main actor of the 1995 attacks in the Gazi Quarter.

He was hired by Bülent Öztürk, a dishonorably discharged army officer in the rank of a major. Gürbüz was than trained by the Gendarmeri in special warfare and psychological warfare. He received false identity documents from Öztürk and the code name "Küçük Hacı" (literally: Little Pilgrim) before he moved to Istanbul for action. He formed there a gang of ten members. Then on the orders of Öztürk, Osman Gürbüz planned and carried out the assault in the Gazi Quarter with his complices.

== See also ==
- Constantinople pogroms
- Alevi massacres
- List of massacres in Turkey
