= Kazim Cecen =

Turkish engineer (1919–1997)

- Born: August 23, 1919
- Died: August 8, 1997 (aged 77)
- Awards: Gothilf Hagen Medal (1967) TÜBİTAK Science Award (1976)
- Scientific career
- Fields: Hydraulic Engineering
- Institutions: Istanbul Technical University Technische Universität Braunschweig TÜBİTAK

Kazim Cecen (August 23, 1919 – August 8, 1997), was a Turkish hydraulic engineering academic and historian of science.

== Life ==
Kazim Cecen was born in Elazig in 1919. In 1937, he completed his high school at İzmir Atatürk High School. After that he went to Germany in 1938 to study hydraulic engineering on a scholarship from the Turkish Ministry of National Education, and he completed his degree in engineering in 1943 from the Technische Hochschule in Berlin (now Technische Universität Berlin). Despite enrolling in a doctoral program at the same university, the onset of the Second World War and worsening war conditions within Germany forced him to return to Turkey in 1945 without completing his program.

After his return to Turkey, he started teaching at Istanbul Technical University (ITU), where he attained an associate professorship in 1949, and full professorship in 1960. In 1959, he attained his PhD from Graz University of Technology in Austria. In 1982, he became the dean of Hydraulics and Water Resources Engineering Department at ITU. In 1985, he went to teach at Technische Universität Braunschweig. For his research output, he was awarded the Gotthilf Hagen Medal in 1967. in 1976, he won the Tübitak Science award for his study on water intake facilities and groundwater flows in Istanbul.

== Works ==
Cecen was the author of numerous works in Turkish and some in English on the waterways of Istanbul, as well as many entries in the Türkiye Diyanet Vakfı İslâm Ansiklopedisi (Encyclopedia of Islam), a Turkish academic encyclopaedia for Islamic studies published by the TDV.

His books include:

- İstanbul'da Osmanlı Devrinde Su Tesisleri (Istanbul: Istanbul Teknik Üniversitesi Yayınları, 1979).
- Süleymaniye Suyolları (Istanbul: Istanbuk Teknik Üniversitesi Bilim ve Teknoloji Araştırma Merkezi, 1986).
- Hüseyin Tevfik Paşa ve "Linear Algebra" (Istanbul: Istanbu Teknik Üniversitesi Yayınları, 1988).
- Mimar Sinan ve Kırkçeşme Tesisleri (Istanbul: Istanbul Büyükşehir Belediyesi İSKİ Yayınları, 1988).
- İstanbul'un Vakıf Sularından Üslüdar Suları (Istanbul: İstanbul Büyükşehir Belediyesi Yayınları, 1991).
- Taksim ve Hamidiye Suları (Istanbul: İstanbul Büyükşehir Belediyesi Yayınları, 1992).
- Sinan's Water Supply System in Istanbul (Istanbul: İSKİ Yayınları, 1996).
- The Longest Roman Water Supply Line (Istanbul: Turkiye Sinai Kalkinma Bankasi, 1996)
- II. Bayezid Suyolu Haritaları (Istanbul: İSKİ Yayınları, 1997).
- Topkapı Sarayı'na Su Sağlayan İsale Hatları (Istanbul: İSKİ Yayınları, 1997) (along with Celal Koray).
- İstanbul'un Osmanlı Dönemi Suyolları (Istanbul: İSKİ Yayınları, 1999) (along with Celal Koray).

He also wrote many articles in Turkish on the TDV Encyclopedia of Islam, especially on the Byzantine and Ottoman waterways of Istanbul.
