= 2012 Istanbul suicide bombing =

Terrorist act in Turkey

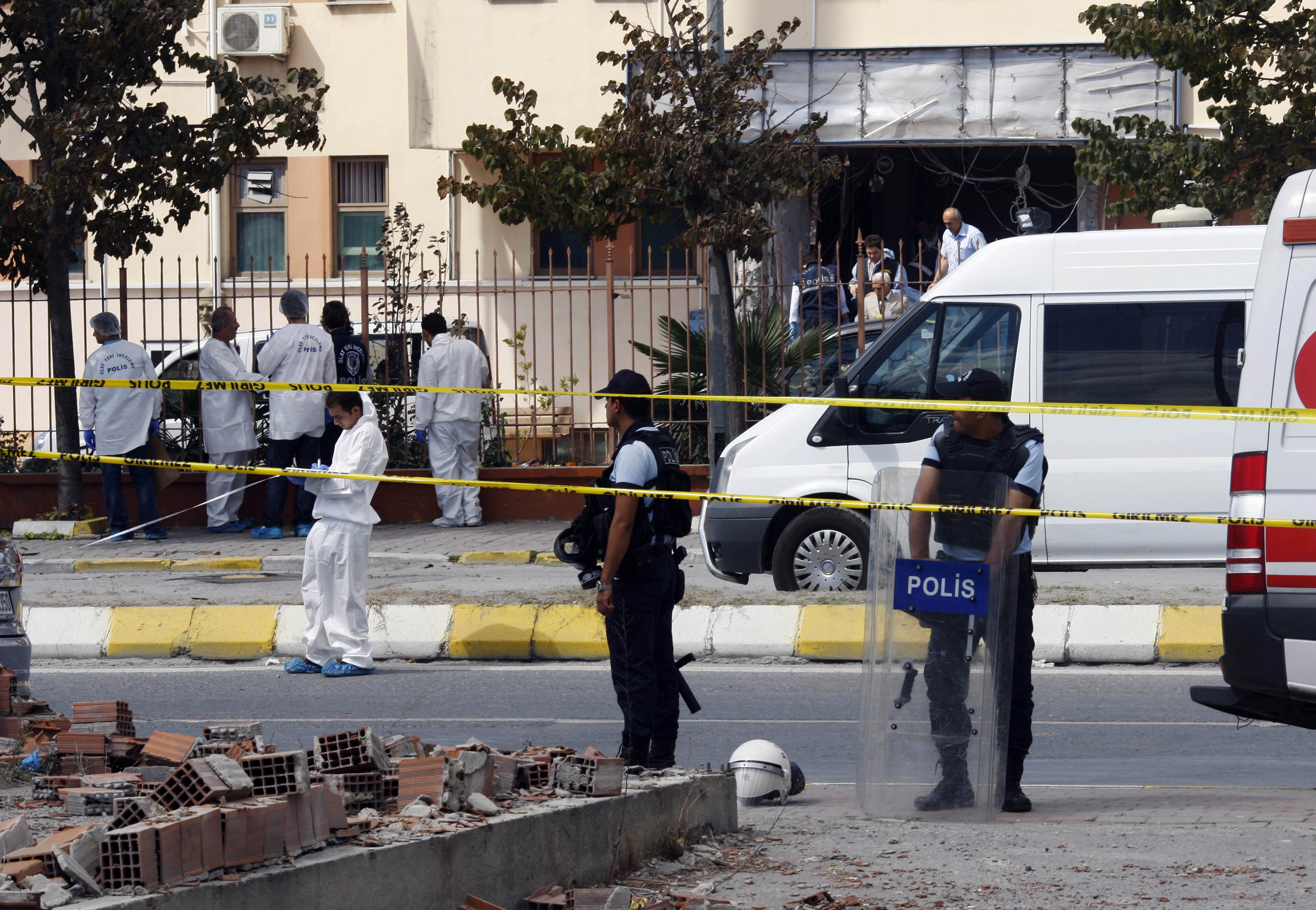
- The police station after the attack
- Location: 41.10866°N 28.89410°E; Sultangazi, Istanbul, Turkey
- Date: 11 September 2012; ~11:00 (UTC+03:00)
- Target: Police station
- Attack type: Suicide bombing
- Deaths: 2 (Including 1 attacker)
- Injuries: 7
- Perpetrator: Revolutionary People's Liberation Party/Front
- Assailant: İbrahim Çuhadar

The 2012 Istanbul suicide bombing occurred at a police station in the Sultangazi district of Istanbul, Turkey. The suicide bomber was İbrahim Çuhadar, a member of the Revolutionary People's Liberation Party/Front (DHKP-C). On 11 September 2012, he went to the police station and attempted to enter, then detonated the explosives at the entrance of the station after the police refused him entrance. As a result of the explosion, the attacker and a police officer died and seven others were injured.

== Background ==
On 20 July 2012, a gunfire was opened on the police from a taxi that did not comply with the stop warning of the police teams located at the entrance of the Gazi neighborhood in the Sultangazi district of Istanbul. Following the clash with the police, those in the taxi demanded that the taxi leave the area by placing a gun on the driver's head. Proceeding about 100 meters, the taxi stopped after crashing into the sidewalk. The male passenger in the vehicle was caught at the scene and the female one trying to escape was injured in Gaziosmanpaşa. It was determined that these people were Hasan Selim Gönen and Sultan Işıklı, members of the Revolutionary People's Liberation Party/Front (DHKP-C). Gönen died on 21 July in the hospital where he was being treated. After the death of Hasan Selim Gönen, the information that DHKP-C was preparing for action against the police stations was reported to the press.

== Attack ==
Location of the police station

At 11:00 AM (UTC+03:00) local time on 11 September 2012, the attacker who came to The 75th Anniversary Police Station in Sultangazi crossed the guard cabin at the gate of the police station and the 50-meter pathway between the garden entrance and the police station entrance. After climbing the stairs at the entrance of the police station, he reached the x-ray device at the entrance door. There he threw a grenade inside of the station, but it did not explode. Then, the police officer Bülent Özkan tried to stop and push the attacker out of the police station. Meanwhile, the assailant detonated the explosives he was carrying. According to the statement of the police officer who was on duty at the door, the sound of two gunshots were heard twice from the building after the suspect entered. It was stated that these gunshots occurred when the police officer Özkan, who later died from his injuries, shot his gun twice just before the explosion.

== Aftermath ==
At the time of the attack, the police officer Özkan, who had sustained serious injuries, died on the road to the hospital. A total of 7 people were injured, including 4 police officers and 3 civilians. The wounded were treated at Bağcılar State Hospital, Okmeydanı Training and Research Hospital and Bezmiâlem Vakıf University Medical Faculty Hospital. After the explosion, a hole was formed in the entrance of the building after the partial collapse of the entrance gate. The windows of the armored vehicles outside the building were broken.

== Investigation ==
In the examination made after the incident, it was determined that the attacker was İbrahim Çuhadar, a member of the Revolutionary People's Liberation Party/Front (DHKP-C), born in Alaca, Çorum, in 1973. Çuhadar had previously spent 8 months in Sincan F-type prison on the grounds that he was a member of DHKP-C. Çuhadar's body was taken from the Forensic Medicine Institute on 14 September and buried in the Gazi Cemetery in Sultangazi on 16 September. In the examinations carried out, it was determined that the explosive wrapped around Çuhadar's body was a pressure-acting and piece-effect plastic explosive.

After the attack, DHKP-C took responsibility for the attack with a statement on a website linked to DHKP-C. In the statement, which included Çuhadar's photograph, the organization explained the rationale for this attack and said "Hasan Selim Gönen was killed by the police officers of this police station. The Gazi police station was not a randomly selected police station." In a photograph dated 30 August 2012 published on the website at midnight the same day, Çuhadar was seen wrapping the explosives used in the attack around his body.

== Reactions ==
By releasing a written statement after the attack, President Abdullah Gül condemned the attack, which he stated to be carried out by the organizations he described as "terrorist groups pursuing outdated ideologies". Prime Minister Recep Tayyip Erdoğan wished healing to the wounded and patience to the relatives of the police officer who died in the attack. Sabri Başköy, Governor of Çorum, where Çuhadar's birth certificate was registered, stated that although Çuhadar was born in Alaca, he left the village for Ankara with his family 30–35 years ago, and had no connection with Çorum since then. Celal Çuhadır, the headman of Tutluca, also stated that the attacker was registered in the population of his own village and added that neither he nor the villagers knew him and condemned the attack. Speaking at the funeral of Özkan, who lost his life in the attack, Istanbul Governor Hüseyin Avni Mutlu and Istanbul Police Chief Hüseyin Çapkın condemned the attack. Çapkın said at the funeral, "We are 40 thousand people who are chiefs and officers to ensure the peace and security of Istanbul. We are all a Bülent."

== See also ==
- Terrorism in Turkey
- List of suicide attacks in Turkey
