= Ahmet Akın =

Turkish businessman and politician (born 1973)

Mayor of Balıkesir Metropolitan Municipality
- Incumbent
- Assumed office 3 April 2024
- Preceded by: Yücel Yılmaz

Member of the Grand National Assembly
- In office June 23, 2015 – May 14, 2023
- Constituency: Balıkesir (June 2015, Nov 2015, 2018)

Personal details
- Born: August 13, 1973 (age 53) Gönen, Balıkesir, Turkey
- Party: Republican People's Party
- Children: 2
- Occupation: Businessman, politician

Ahmet Akın (born August 13, 1973, Gönen, Balıkesir, Turkey) is a Turkish businessman and politician and social democratic politician serving as the 4th Mayor of Balıkesir Metropolitan Municipality. He has served as a member of the Turkish parliament for Balıkesir during the 25th, 26th, and 27th terms. He is also the deputy chairman responsible for local governments at the Republican People's Party (CHP).

== Biography ==
On August 13, 1973, Akın was born in Gönen, Balıkesir. After completing his primary and secondary education in Gönen, he graduated from İzmir Atatürk High School. Akın pursued language and economics studies at Eurocentres in Cambridge, England, and then completed his political science education at Bahçeşehir University. Following his graduation from the Faculty of Arts and Sciences at Beykent University, he went on to obtain a master's degree in Political Science and International Relations at Selçuk University. Akın attended various training sessions and seminars on "Renewable Energy Resources and Production" in Spain on different occasions. He has worked as a general manager in private sector organizations in the energy field and as a CEO and board member in international holding companies. Akın is proficient in English, Spanish, and Italian languages, and he is married with two children.

=== Political career ===
In the June 2015 general elections in Turkey, where no single party reached the required number of seats to form a majority government, Akın, as a member of the Republican People's Party (CHP), was elected as a deputy for Balıkesir. He was once again elected as a CHP deputy for Balıkesir in the November 2015 general elections. During the 26th term of the Turkish Grand National Assembly (TBMM), he served as a member of the Public Economic Enterprises Commission and the Foreign Affairs Commission. In 2016, he became the chief advisor to the CHP Chairman Kemal Kılıçdaroğlu.

On April 22, 2018, before the 2018 general elections in Turkey, Akın switched to the İYİ Party along with 14 CHP (Republican People's Party) deputies in order to form a parliamentary group. On May 10, 2018, it was announced that 15 deputies, including Akın, had returned to the Republican People's Party.

In the 2018 general elections, he was nominated as the top candidate for Balıkesir and was re-elected as a member of parliament.

Prior to the 2019 local elections, he was nominated as the candidate for the Mayor of Balıkesir Metropolitan Municipality by the CHP Party Council. However, following the alliance decision between the CHP and the İYİ Party, he withdrew his candidacy in favor of İsmail Ok, the İYİ Party candidate.

During the 37th Ordinary Congress of the Republican People's Party, he was elected as a member of the Party Council. After the congress, he was appointed as the deputy chairman responsible for energy and infrastructure projects in the CHP Central Executive Board.

On May 14, 2023, he did not apply for candidacy in the general elections. Instead, he was introduced by the CHP chairman, Kemal Kılıçdaroğlu, as a ministerial candidate during the election campaign.

On June 1, 2023, he submitted his resignation to the CHP Chairman Kemal Kılıçdaroğlu during the Central Executive Board (MYK) meeting and resigned from the MYK. On June 5, 2023, it was announced that he had been appointed as the deputy chairman for local governments within the CHP, according to a statement made by the CHP.

On March 29, 2024, in the 2024 Turkish local elections, he ran as the Mayor of the Balıkesir Metropolitan Municipality from the Republican People's Party (CHP) and was elected with 51.1% of the vote over Yücel Yılmaz from Justice and Development Party (AKP) with 40.5%.

Political offices
Preceded by Yücel Yılmaz	Mayor of Balıkesir Metropolitan Municipality; 29 March 2024 – present	Succeeded by Incumbent
