= Mağlova Aqueduct =

Arch bridge in Istanbul, Istanbul, Turkey; Istanbul, Istanbul, Turkey

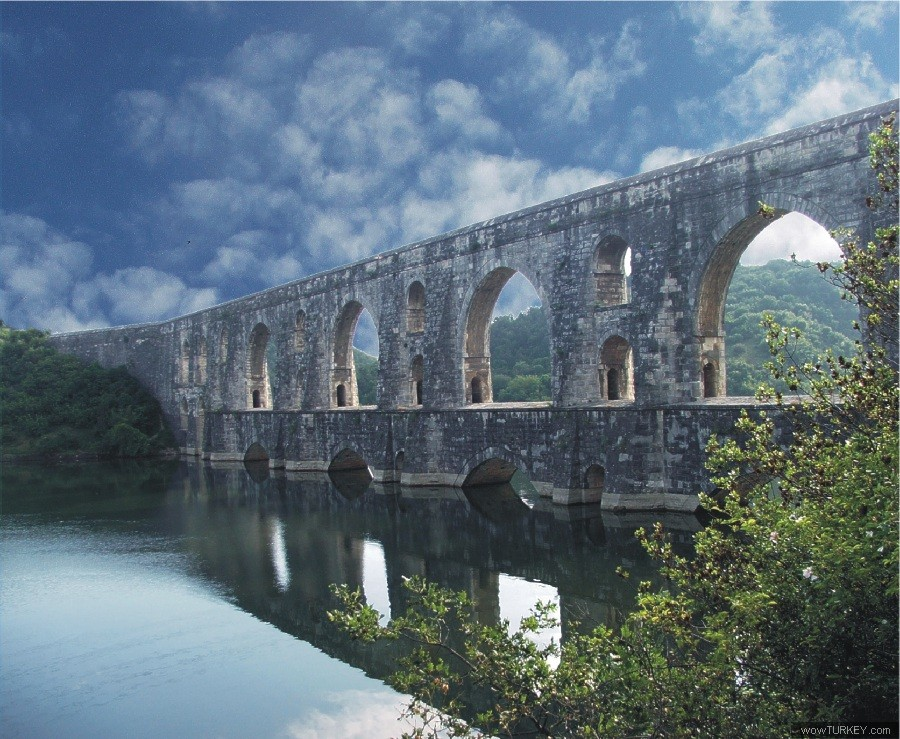
Maglova Aqueduct

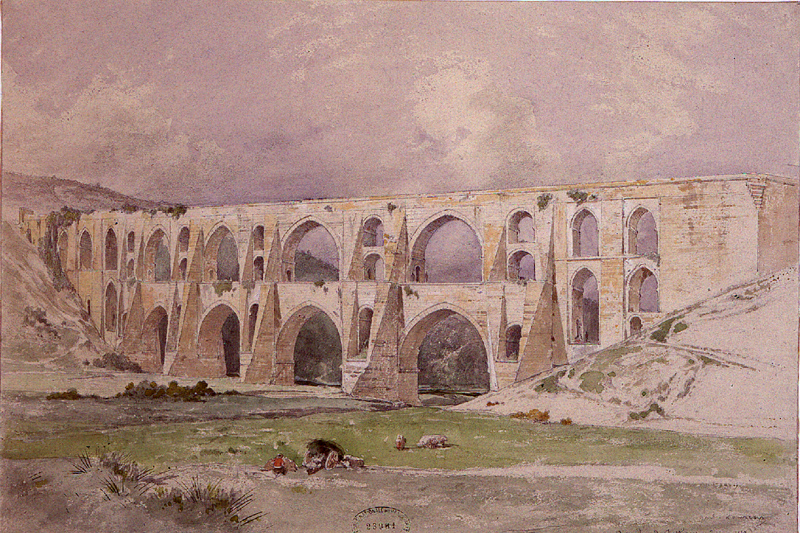
Depiction of the arch in 1847

The Mağlova Aqueduct or Muallakkemer is an aqueduct built by Sinan the Architect between 1555 and 1562 on the Alibey Creek valley in Istanbul by order of Suleiman the Magnificent. Today, it is located near Cebeci village in Sultangazi district.

== History ==
In 1563, it was damaged by floods, but was repaired and restored the same year. The lake water of the Alibeyköy dam covers a quarter of the structure. The arch continues to carry water to Istanbul.

35 meters high and 257 meters long, the aqueduct has two floors. The aqueduct has 8 large eyes on the lower level and 8 small eyes on the upper level. Four of the eyes on the lower level were made larger than the others. Their width is 18.4 meters. The width of the middle 4 eyes on the upper level is 13.4 meters.

Historian Semavi Eyice said of the arch, "The Mağlova aqueduct is as important a work in civil architecture as the Süleymaniye and Selimiye mosques are in religious architecture. In my opinion, leaving it in the dam lake is the greatest crime in terms of Turkish art history." The aqueduct can be seen when the dam waters recede.

In 2005, 1,250 Mağlova Aqueduct commemorative coins worth 20 TL were minted.
