= Fatih Portakal =

Turkish journalist and TV presenter (born 1967)

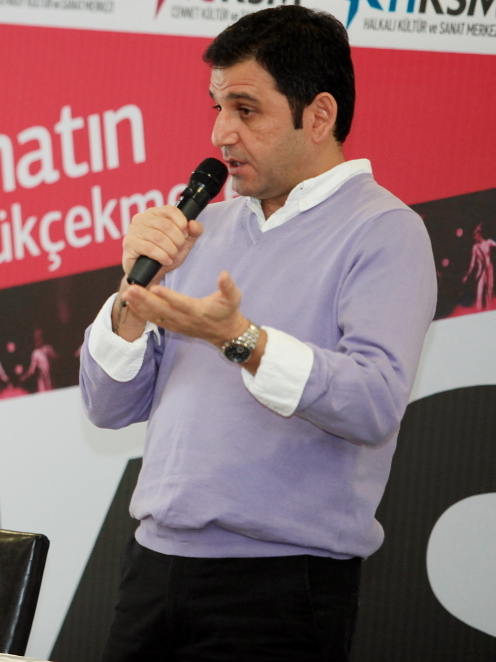
- Portakal in 2012
- Born: 2 February 1967 (age 59); Nazilli, Aydın, Turkey
- Education: İzmir Atatürk High School; Istanbul University
- Occupations: Journalist, television presenter, writer
- Years active: 1997–2020
- Spouse: Armağan Portakal (m. 1997)
- Awards: Golden Butterfly Award for Best Male TV Presenter (2016)
- Website: www.fatihportakal.com

Fatih Portakal (born 2 February 1967) is a Turkish journalist and television presenter.

== Life and career ==
Portakal was born on 2 February 1967 in Nazilli. He completed his primary education there and later finished his secondary education in İzmir Atatürk High School. He then enrolled in Istanbul University School of Business Administration before moving to Australia in 1994 to earn his master's degree and receive foreign-language education.

After completing his education, he operated a restaurant in Australia for a while. In 1997, he returned to Turkey and married Armağan Toper. Between 1997 and 2005, he worked as a reporter for Star TV. In 2005, at the offer of Mehmet Ali Birand, he joined the crew of Kanal D. In May 2010, he received an offer from Fox reporter İrfan Değirmenci and transferred to Fox.

Between 2010 and 2013, Portakal presented the program Çalar Saat on Fox. Nazlı Tolga gave up her position as the main news bulletin presenter on 14 June 2013 and was replaced by Portakal who began presenting the program Fox Ana Haber in September 2013. He also presented another program, titled Fatih Portakal ile Türkiye'nin Trendleri, simultaneously.

In 2016, he received the Best Male News Anchor Award at the 43rd Golden Butterfly Awards. The next year, he received the award again at the 44th Golden Butterfly Awards. In 2020, he resigned from his position as the main news presenter on Fox and his program Fatih Portakal ile FOX Ana Haber ended. He subsequently opened his own YouTube channel and began uploading videos, evaluating current events and news.

== Works ==
- Ses'SİZ (2012)
- Aklımla Dalga Geçme (2016)

== Programs ==
- Fatih Portakal ile Çalar Saat (2010-2013)
- Fatih Portakal ile FOX Ana Haber (2013–2020)
