= Hayri Kozakçıoğlu =

Turkish politician

15th Governor of İstanbul
- In office August 19, 1991 – November 1, 1995
- Preceded by: B. Cahit Bayar
- Succeeded by: Rıdvan Yenişen

Regional Governor
- In office July 19, 1987 – August 19, 1991
- Appointed by: President Turgut Özal
- Preceded by: newly established
- Succeeded by: Mehmet Necati Çetinkaya

Governor of Diyarbakır Province
- In office January 12, 1987 – July 19, 1987
- Preceded by: Ahmet Elbeyli
- Succeeded by: Hamdi Ardalı

Governor of Sakarya Province
- In office 1983–1987
- Preceded by: Mehmet Aldan
- Succeeded by: Nurettin Turan

Governor of Adana Province
- In office 1980–1983
- Preceded by: Metin Dirimtekin
- Succeeded by: Erdoğan Şahinoğlu

Police Chief of Istanbul Province
- In office July 17, 1978 – December 18, 1979
- Preceded by: Nazmi İyibil
- Succeeded by: Şükrü Balcı

Governor of Erzurum Province
- In office 1978–1978
- Preceded by: Sadri Turan
- Succeeded by: Zihni Akın

Personal details
- Born: 1938 Alaşehir, Manisa, Turkey
- Died: May 23, 2013 (aged 74–75) Sarıyer, Istanbul, Turkey
- Resting place: Zincirlikuyu Cemetery, Istanbul
- Party: True Path Party (DYP)
- Spouse: Sabire Kozakçioglu
- Children: daughters: Faika (Alan), Meral (Özekici), son: Ferhan
- Education: Ankara University
- Profession: Civil servant

Hayri Kozakçıoğlu (1938 – May 23, 2013) was a Turkish high-ranking civil servant and politician. He served as district governor, police chief, province governor in various administrative divisions. He was known as the first regional governor in the state of emergency ("OHAL") imposed in the provinces of Southeastern Anatolia and governor of Istanbul Province. He was found dead on the morning of May 23, 2013, in his house at Sarıyer, Istanbul.

== Early life and career ==
Hayri Kozakçıoğlu was born in 1938 to Ahmet and his spouse Lütfiye in Alaşehir, Manisa Province.

After completing his primary education in Alaşehir, Kozakçıoğlu attended Atatürk High School in İzmir, finishing in 1955. He was educated then in political science at Ankara University between 1955-1959.

Following his graduation in 1959, he entered state service in the Ministry of the Interior, becoming a candidate district governor. Kozakçıoğlu served later as district governor (Turkish: Kaymakam) in Çamlıhemşin, Ardeşen, Delice, Çüngüş, Çınar, Kepsut and Gökçeada (Imbros) districts in 1970.

In 1970, he was promoted to the post of a Civil inspector at the ministry, and later became chief inspector.

After receiving special training by Scotland Yard in security matters, he was appointed in 1978, governor (Turkish: Vali) of Erzurum Province. His next post was the office of police chief in Istanbul Province for the period July 17, 1978 – December 18, 1979.

On September 12, 1980, Kozakçıoğlu served as governor for three years in Adana Province and, for three and half years in Sakarya Province also. On January 12, 1987, he was appointed governor of Diyarbakır Province.

A region known as the OHAL region was established in 1987 in Southeastern Anatolia, which at the beginning included eight provinces such as Bingöl, Diyarbakır, Elazığ, Hakkari, Mardin, Siirt, Tunceli and Van. Kozakçıoğlu became the first regional governor, appointed by President Turgut Özal. Called "super governor" (Turkish: Süper vali), he took office on 19 July 1987.

Kozakçıoğlu was appointed on August 19, 1991 governor of Istanbul Province, the most populated administrative division in Turkey. He served as governor of Istanbul Province for 4 years.

On March 12, 1995, an attack on a cafe in the mainly by Alevi inhabited Gazi neighborhood in Istanbul resulted in the death of one person and twenty five people were wounded. This assault triggered riots in the Gazi Quarter that lasted for several days. People took to the streets and the police and Gendarmerie surrounded the neighborhood. More than 20 people died as the police shot at the crowds. Kozakçıoğlu imposed martial law over the locations in unrest for three days.

At this post, he served until his resignation on November 1, 1995, to enter politics.

== Politics ==
After his retirement from the state service, Kozakçıoğlu joined True Path Party (DYP), and was elected to the parliament as a deputy of Istanbul following the 1995 general elections held on December 24. At the party, he served as the deputy chairman. He was reelected a second time as deputy of Istanbul into the parliament after the 1999 general elections held on April 18.

== Family life ==
Hayri Kozakçıoğlu married Sabire Kozakçıoğlu in 1959 . The couple has two daughters Faika (Alan, married 1992), Meral (Özekici, married 1999) and a son Ferhan.

== Legacy ==
A vocational high school in Kağıthane, Istanbul is named after him.

== Scandals ==
According to news published in September 1993 by the Turkish media, Hayri Kozakçıoğlu was accused of having speculated by transferring 2 billion Turkish Lira (approx. $250,000) of the funds provided by the United Nations from the regional governor's account to his private account, at the time he was the regional governor. He claimed that he did transfer the money on August 12, 1991, with the approval of Interior Minister Mustafa Kalemli, and he paid the amount back on January 18, 1993, upon the regional governor's request. However, Minister Kalemli stated that he had had no knowledge about this transaction.

Prime minister Tansu Çiller demanded Hayri Kozakçıoğlu's resignation. President Süleyman Demirel declared that "the funds were dedicated for discretionary spending in fight against terror. To disclose for what reason the funds were spent, might bring the state in difficulties".

He and his family members were repeatedly the subject of scandal news coverage. His spouse and daughters were criticized for living in over-proportional standards. His son was accused of sexual harassment by a model.

== Death ==
In the early morning of May 23, 2013, Kozakçıoğlu was found dead in his villa at Reşitpaşa neighborhood of Sarıyer, Istanbul. He was shot at close range in the left side of his chest, and the gun was found next to him.

Due to the suspicious death of the former State of Emergency (OHAL) Region and Istanbul Governor Hayri Kozakçıoğlu, an investigation was opened. This investigation that was carried out by the Istanbul Chief Public Prosecutor's Office (Istanbul Public Prosecutor Isa Dalgiç being the conductor of this investigation) had ended in non-prosecution upon the understanding that Kozakçıoğlu death was caused by suicide, on the report of the evidence gathered from the crime scene investigation, the forensic medicine, and the expertise and criminal reports taken after the incident^{[13]} .

He was survived by his wife Sabire, two daughters, Faika, Prof. Dr. Meral Kozakçıoğlu Özekici and son Ferhan.^{[14]} On May 25, he was buried at the Zincirlikuyu Cemetery following the religious funeral at Teşvikiye Mosque
