= İzmir Atatürk High School =

High school in İzmir, Turkey

- İzmir Atatürk Lisesi
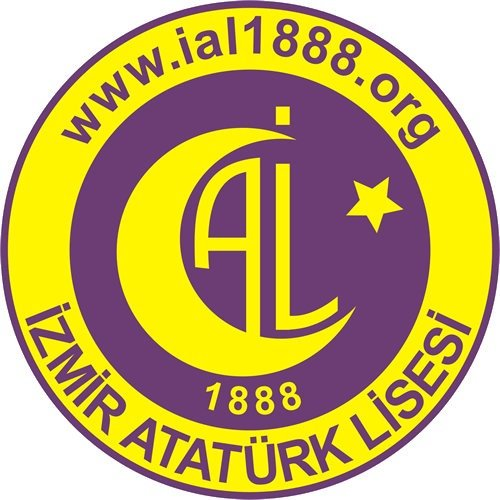

Location
- Konak; İzmir, Turkey; 38°25′45″N 27°08′25″E

Information
- Type: Public
- Established: 1886
- Color
- Website: izmirataturklisesi.meb.k12.tr

İzmir Atatürk High School (Turkish: İzmir Atatürk Lisesi; est. 1886) is a high school in İzmir, Turkey.

== History ==
İzmir Atatürk High School (İAL) was established in 1886 as a 5-year preparatory school. The school was subsequently converted to a 7-year preparatory school in 1890 and became a high school in 1910. Serving more than a hundred years as a day and boarding school for boys, the school started admitting girls in the year 1998.

Currently, the school employs 98 full-time teachers serving the needs of more than 1500 students.

== Notable alumni ==
Prime ministers

- Şükrü Saracoğlu (6th Prime Minister of Turkey)
- Şemsettin Günaltay (9th Prime Minister of Turkey)

Ministers

- Vasıf Çınar, educator, politician, journalist and diplomat.
- Mustafa Necati, statesman
- Reşit Galip
- Metin Bostancıoğlu
- İlhami Sancar
- Hilmi Uran
- Şerif Tüten
- Sırrı Day
- Sümer Oral

Mayors

- Ahmet Akın, Mayor of Balıkesir Metropolitan Municipality

Writers

- Halit Ziya Uşaklıgil
- Ahmet Haşim
- Mehmet Emin Yurdakul
- Yakup Kadri Karaosmanoğlu

Poets

- Necati Cumali
- Attilâ İlhan

Musicians

- Ahmed Adnan Saygun
- Levent Fırat

Chiefs of the general staff

- Kazım Orbay
- Memduh Tağmaç

Civil servants

- Behçet Uz, physician and Mayor of İzmir
- Hayri Kozakçıoğlu (Province governor)
- Ahmet Piriştina Mayor of İzmir

Journalists

- Fatih Portakal

Sportspeople

- Hüseyin Beşok, part of 2001 European Silver Medalist Basketball Team
- Mahmut Özgener, footballer, president of Turkish Football Federation

Businesspeople

- Selim Gökdemir, businessman

Sculptors

- Sadi Çalık

Academicians/scientists/engineers

- Kazım Çeçen
- Sefaattin Tongay (Professor of Materials Science and Engineering, Arizona, USA)
