= Selim Gökdemir =

Turkish businessman (born 1960)

- Born: 1960 (age 65–66)
- Occupation: Businessman

Selim Gökdemir (born 1960) is a Turkish businessman. He is chairman of the board of directors of the Megapol Group in affiliation with which he has made several of İzmir's first skyscrapers.

== Biography ==
Selim Gökdemir was born in 1960 in İzmir. He attended the İzmir Atatürk Lisesi and graduated from high school in 1978. He went to Germany to study electrical engineering and established his first company in Germany in 1984. Later, he was requested to come back to Turkey by his father who was a well-known contractor. Gökdemir became general manager of the family's brick factory.

He started in real estate in the end of 1980, when he worked on the development of a plot owned by his family. In 1992, he became chairman of the Megapol Group board of directors and in 1994, he developed his first tower, Mavi Kule.

Megapol Group was responsible for the construction of the first two skyscrapers in Bayrakli.

He developed several towers in İzmir including Gökdemir, Mavi Kule, Heris Tower, Sunucu Plaza, Kordon Kule, Megapol Tower, and Çarşı Kule; and, as of 2018, was working on the Megapol İzmir project.

Gökdemir was involved in legal proceedings involving arrested individuals connected with alleged financing of FETÖ.

== Personal life ==
He is fluent in Turkish, German and English and has three children.
