= 2016 Cizre bombing =

Terrorist attack in Turkey

- Part of Kurdish–Turkish conflict (1978–present); Kurdish–Turkish conflict (2015–present)
- Location: 37°20′23.1″N 42°11′46.0″E; Cizre, Şırnak, Turkey
- Date: 26 August 2016; 06:45 (UTC+03:00)
- Target: Cizre District Police Department, Riot Control Police checkpoint
- Attack type: Car bomb, suicide attack
- Deaths: 13 (including the perpetrator)
- Injuries: 78
- Perpetrator: Kurdistan Workers' Party (PKK)
- Assailant: Mustafa Aslan
- Motive: Anti-Turkish

The 2016 Cizre bombing was a suicide bombing by PKK member Mustafa Aslan in Cizre, Turkey. The assailant used a car bomb to attack a police checkpoint outside the police headquarters. Twelve police officers and Aslan were killed in addition to 75 police officers and three civilians injured.

== Attack ==
The attack took place at 06:45 (UTC+03:00) local time on the street where the Cizre District Police Headquarters and the Riot Control Branch Office buildings are located in the Konak neighborhood of Cizre. The attacker approached the police checkpoint with the 10 ton explosives loaded on a truck, following which a conflict broke out. When the assailant could not cross the police checkpoint located about 50 meters (160 ft) from the police buildings, he exploded the bomb loaded vehicle there.

== Later events ==
As a result of the explosion, the assailant and 11 police officers died and 78 people were injured. On 29 September 2016, with the death of police officer Safa Altınsoy at Gülhane Military Medical Academy, who was injured during the incident, the number of security personnel killed in the bombing rose to 12. In addition, the Cizre District Governor Ahmet Adanur and a seven-month-old baby were reported among the injured.

Due to the severity of the explosion, the district police headquarters building was destroyed and damage occurred in many houses and workplaces. On the side of the building, the sections where the police were staying were destroyed and the material warehouse lit up. Part of the retaining wall of the Cizre Garrison Command was damaged. Reinforcement police teams, TOMAs and fire trucks were dispatched to the scene.

After the attack, the Governor of Şırnak banned the entrance and exit to the Cizre district, and the Cizre-Şırnak highway was closed to transportation. Within the scope of the investigation made after the attack, it was claimed that the dump truck used was owned by the Şırnak Municipality and rented and used by Cizre Municipality. The PKK, who took responsibility for the attack on the same day, announced the name of the attacker as Mustafa Aslan, whose nom de guerre was Fırat Pirsus.

=== Broadcasting ban ===
The Radio and Television Supreme Council (RTÜK) stated that with the letter of the Prime Minister, a temporary broadcasting ban was imposed on the attack in Cizre. In the written statement made by RTÜK, it was stated that in article 7 of the Law No. 6112 on the Establishment and Broadcasting Services of Radio and Television, that "temporary broadcasting prohibition can be imposed when national security is clearly required or when the public order is likely to be severely impaired."

=== Perpetrators ===
The military arm of the PKK, HPG, took responsibility for the attack that was carried out in Cizre as well as the attack that occurred during the passage of a convoy in Şavşat, which also included the leader of the Republican People's Party Kemal Kılıçdaroğlu, and in which a soldier was killed. In a statement made by the HPG, it was stated that the Cizre attack was carried out in revenge for the people killed during the Şırnak clashes (2015–2016).

== Reactions ==
=== National ===
President Recep Tayyip Erdoğan issued a written message addressing the attack in Cizre. In his message, Erdoğan said "Turkey will never give passage to the dirty ambitions of subcontractors." Stating that the attack has increased the determination to fight terrorism even more, Erdoğan made the assessment that "No one should doubt that our struggle against terrorist attacks targeting our children in Gaziantep and the leader of the main opposition party in Artvin will be successful due to our understanding of their mobilization."

Prime Minister Binali Yıldırım, who was on an official tour of Bulgaria, held a joint press conference with Bulgarian Prime Minister Boyko Borisov in which he said "We have fought a total war against all terrorist organizations. Turkey has 11 more martyrs now. No terrorist organization can take captive the Republic of Turkey. As Atatürk said in the Turkish War of Independence, it's 'either independence or death' for us."

Republican People's Party chairman Kemal Kılıçdaroğlu expressed his condolences Twitter and said, "These treacherous attacks will never break our union. I wish God's mercy to our children martyred in Cizre and immediate recovery to the wounded."

=== International ===
- United States – In the written statement made by the United States National Security Council spokesperson Ned Price, it was written that "The US condemns the terrorist attack with the harshest language." By reminding that PKK had taken the responsibility for the attack, Price added that if it were to be confirmed, it would be the latest example of PKK's increasing violent attacks in Turkey that would bring deep concerns.
- European Union – Federica Mogherini, High Representative of the Union for Foreign Affairs and Security Policy, condemned the Cizre attack. In a written statement, Mogherini said "We extend our condolences to the families and relatives of those killed, and wish a speedy recovery to those injured. The European Union will continue to work together with Turkey to fight terrorism."

== See also ==
- Terrorism in Turkey
