= Sultangazi =

- District and municipality
- Logo

- Map showing Sultangazi District in Istanbul Province

- Location within Turkey Location within Istanbul
- Coordinates: 41°5′57″N 28°52′05″E
- Country: Turkey
- Province: Istanbul

Government
  - Mayor: Abdurrahman Dursun (AKP)
- Area: 37 km^{2} (14 sq mi)
- Population (2022): 542,531
  - Density: 15,000/km^{2} (38,000/sq mi)
- Time zone: UTC+3 (TRT)
- Postal code: 34260, 34265, 34270
- Area code: 0212
- Website: www.sultangazi.bel.tr

Sultangazi is municipality and district of Istanbul Province, Turkey. Its area is 37 km^{2}, and its population is 542,531 (2022). To the west are the neighbourhoods of Esenler and Başakşehir, Gaziosmanpaşa is to the south and Eyüpsultan is to the north and east. One border of the district is formed by the TEM highway.

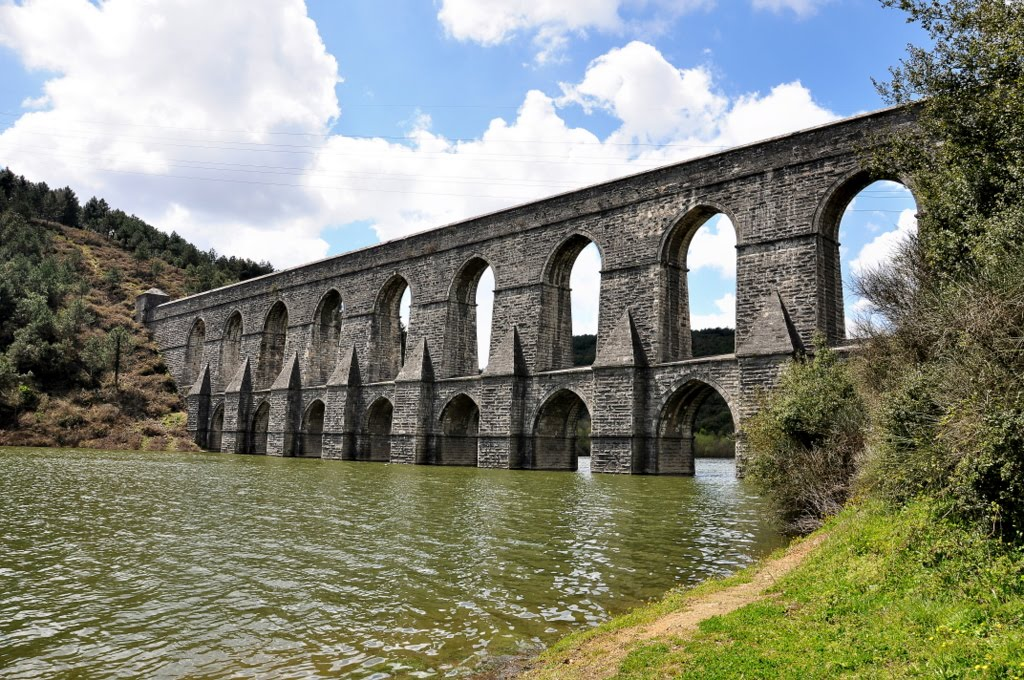
Güzelce Aquaduct, also called the Güzelce Kemer Sinan.

In 2008 the district Sultangazi was created from parts of the districts Gaziosmanpaşa, Eyüpsultan and Esenler. The name of "Sultangazi" comes from "Sultan" word part of Sultançiftliği (meaning farm of the Sultan) and the neighbourhood of Gazi, with "gazi" the Turkish for a venerated soldier.

This district's population comprises many ethnic minorities, including immigrants from Bulgaria and the former Yugoslavia, the Black Sea region of Turkey, Kurds and Alevis, as well as Turks. Kurdish minority and Alevi people are mostly found in the Gazi neighbourhood, which has become infamous in Turkey after the 1995 riots.

== Composition ==
There are 15 neighbourhoods in Sultangazi District:

- 50. Yıl
- 75. Yıl
- Cebeci
- Cumhuriyet
- Esentepe
- Eski Habipler
- Gazi
- Habibler
- İsmet Paşa
- Malkoçoğlu
- Sultançiftliği
- Uğur Mumcu
- Yayla
- Yunus Emre
- Zübeyde Hanım

== Sport ==
- Cebeci Sports Complex

== Notable places ==
- Cebeci Sport Hall, multi-purpose sport venue of the Istanbul Metropolitan Municipality
- Mağlova Aqueduct, 16th-century aqueduct
- Güzelce Aqueduct
- Mimar Sinan Urban Forest

== See also ==
- 1995 Gazi Quarter riots
- December 2009 Kurdish protests in Turkey
- 2012 Istanbul suicide bombing
