= 2016 Elazığ bombing =

Car bombing in Elazığ, Turkey

- Location: Elazığ, Elazığ Province, Turkey
- Date: 18 August 2016; 09:20
- Attack type: Car bombing, suicide bombing
- Deaths: 6 (including the perpetrator)
- Injuries: 217
- Perpetrator: PKK
- Assailant: Çekdar Mahir Serbest

The 2016 Elazığ bombing was a car bombing targeting a police station in Elazığ, Turkey on 18 August 2016, a Thursday. Attack was perpetrated by Kurdistan Workers' Party (PKK). Six people including one perpetrator died in the attack and 217 others were injured. Two people were arrested related to the attack. The PKK claimed that the attack had killed more than 100 police officers while wounding over 150. The next day, crowds were protesting the assault on the police headquarters.
