= Sini Creek =

Creek in Turkey

Sini

Location
- Country: Turkey

Physical characteristics
- Mouth: Mediterranean Sea
  - coordinates: 36°05′56″N 32°58′24″E

Sini Creek (Turkish: Sini Çayı) is a creek in Mersin Province, south Turkey.

The headwaters are in Toros Mountains to the south of Yarmasu village of Gülnar ilçe, where it is called Kazıklı Dere. In the northern part of Bozyazı ilçe the creek is named Gökdere. With tributaries in Dereköy and Kızılca, it flows south. The creek features a waterfall around the ruins of a medieval-age monastery named Karamanastır, after which there are a number of artificial ponds and a low power (0.42 MW) hydroelectric plant. The creek's mouth discharges into the Mediterranean Sea within the Bozyazı ilçe center.
