= Bəydili =

Bəydili or Beydili may refer to:

- Bəydili, Bilasuvar, Azerbaijan
- Bəydili, Salyan, Azerbaijan
- Bəydili, Yevlakh, Azerbaijan

== See also ==
- Beydili, Bayat
- Beydilli, Çivril
- Beydili, Çorum
- Beydili, Gülnar, Turkey
