= Babadıl Creek =

River in Mersin Province, Turkey

Babadıl Creek is a creek in Turkey.

The headwaters are in the mid range of Toros Mountains. The course of the river is in Mersin Province with a total length over 40 kilometres (25 mi). It has an irregular flow rate creek with the maximum flow in the spring. It is used in the irrigation of agricultural land around. It flows to Mediterranean Sea within the town of Sipahili (former Babadıl) of Gülnar ilçe (district) at 36°09′47″N 33°27′49″E.
