= Hoca =

Hoca (pronounced [hoˈdʒa]), also rendered into English as hodja, is a Turkish word deriving from the Persian word خواجه khwāja, khâjeh, used as a title, given name or surname.

As a honorific title, hoca means “master” and is commonly used for teachers, professors, leaders, and in general, wise people. It is also used as a slang word between friends.

It may refer to:

- Canım Hoca Mehmed Pasha, 18th-century Ottoman admiral
- Cinci Hoca (died 1648), Ottoman spiritualist
- Adnan Hoca (born 1956), Turkish cult leader and Muslim televangelist
- İskilipli Âtıf Hoca (1875–1926), Turkish Islamic scholar
- Hoca Ali Rıza (1858–1939), Turkish painter
- Hoca Çelebi or Ebussuud Efendi (1490–1574), Hanafi Ottoman jurist and Qur'an exegete
- Hoca Ishak Efendi (1774–1835), Ottoman engineer and mathematician
- Hoca Kadri Efendi (1855–1918), Ottoman journalist and political figure
- Hoca Niyaz or Hoja-Niyaz, Uyghur independence movement leader who led several rebellions in Xinjiang
- Hoca Sadüddin Efendi (1536–1599), Ottoman scholar, official, historian, a teacher of Ottoman sultan Murad III
- Hoca Sefer, captain, who was in charge of pro-Ottoman forces in Gujarat in the first half of the 15th century
- Hoca Tahsin Efendi (1811–1881), Albanian astronomer, mathematician and philosopher
- Nasreddin Hoca or Nasreddin, Seljuq satirical Sufi figure (around 13th century)
- Fatahillah or Hoca Hassan, Malay commander in the Malacca and Demak sultanates

== See also ==
- Hoxha (surname), Albanian surname of the same origin
- Hoçë e Vogël, village in Kosovo
- Velika Hoča, village in Kosovo
