= Kızılliman =

Turkish headland (Mediterranean)

Kızılliman (literally" Red harbor") is a Mediterranean headland in Turkey known for the ruins of ancient stone quarry Melenie.

The tip of the headland is at 36°04′11″N 33°04′43″E to the west of Tekmen town. Administratively, it is a part of Bozyazı ilçe (district) of Mersin Province. The length of the headland is about 1.5 kilometres (0.93 mi). Its distance to Bozyazı is 10 kilometres (6.2 mi) and to Mersin is 202 kilometres (126 mi).

The ancient quarry Melenie is on the headland. The stone material of the quarry is a type of stone more malleable than the other type of stones around like slate or shale. In the ruins there are partially shaped stone blocks which give the impression that the site was aboandoned in a hurry.
