= Akova =

Akova is a place name that may refer to:

- Akova Castle, a medieval castle in Arcadia, Greece
  - Barony of Akova, a medieval Frankish lordship centred on Akova
- Akova, Argos, a settlement in the community and municipal unit of Argos, Greece
- Akova, Gülnar, a village in Gülnar district of Mersin Province, Turkey
- the Turkish name of Gypsou in Northern Cyprus
