= Pisurgia =

Town on the coast of ancient Cilicia

Coordinates: 36°07′38″N 33°06′44″E

Pisurgia or Pisourgia (Ancient Greek: τὰ Πισούργια) was a town on the coast of ancient Cilicia, between Celenderis and Seleucia ad Calycadnum, 45 stadia to the west of Cape Crauni (modern Silisalma Burnu or Ada Burnu), and to the right of the island of Crambusa.

Its site is located near Sipahili (Babadil) in Asiatic Turkey.
