= İskilipli Mehmed Atıf Hoca =

Turkish Islamic scholar

Mehmed Âtıf Hoca
- محمد عاطف خواجه
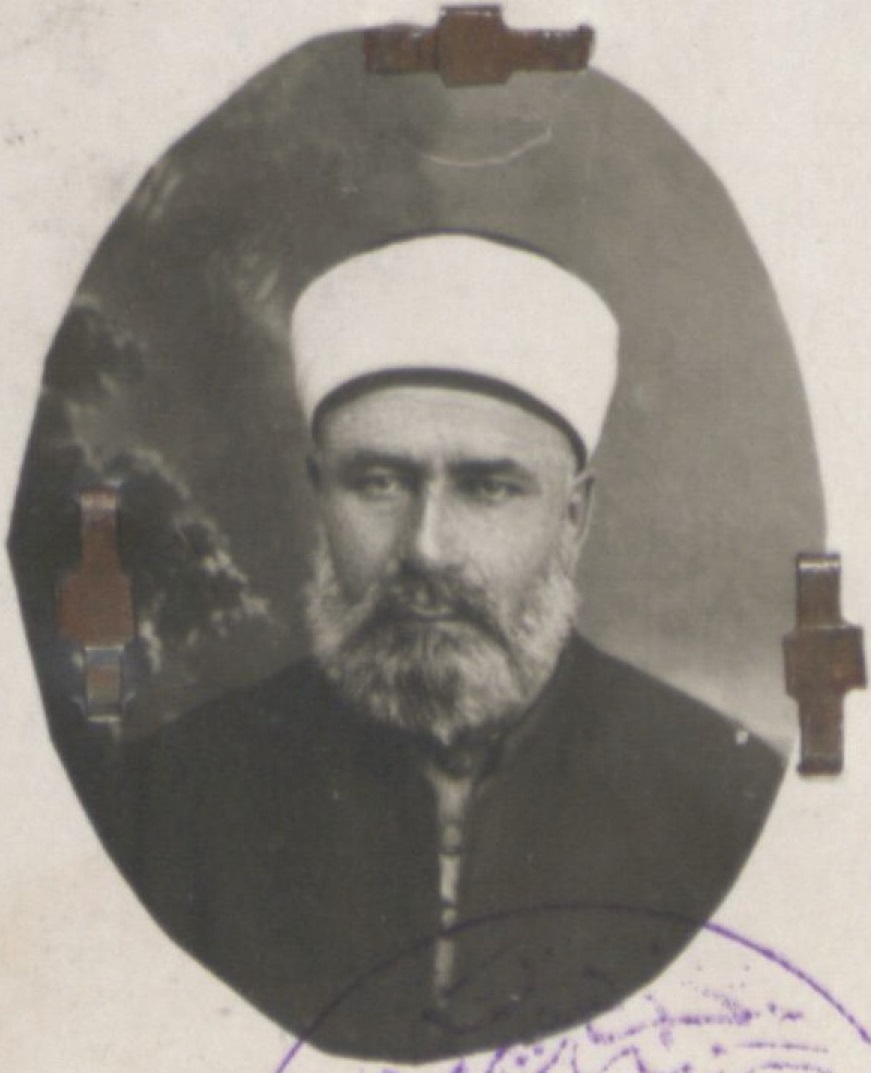

Personal life
- Born: Mehmed Âtıf; 1875 Toyhane, Bayat, Ottoman Empire
- Died: 4 February 1926 (aged 51) Ankara, Turkey
- Cause of death: Execution by hanging
- Notable work(s): Frenk Mukallitliği ve Şapka (Westernization and the [European] Hat), Medeniyet-i Şer'iyye ve Terakkiyat-ı Diniyye (The Civilization of the Sharia and Religious Progress)
- Other name: İskilipli Mehmed Âtıf
- Occupation: Imam, religious scholar

Religious life
- Religion: Islam
- Denomination: Sunni

Mehmed Âtıf Hoca (Ottoman Turkish: محمد عاطف خواجه) was a Turkish Islamist. He was born in the village of Toyhane, in the district of Bayat, Çorum Province, in the Ottoman Empire (present-day Turkey) and went to school there. After a couple of years as an imam in İskilip (hence "İskilipli" meaning "from İskilip") in 1893 he went to Istanbul to continue his education, first at a medrese and from 1902 at Darü'l-fünun Faculty of Divinity. He graduated in 1903 and took a job teaching as Ders-i Amm (Ulama), at the madrasah in the Fatih Mosque, Istanbul. He was later arrested and jailed several times, but freed. He and Mustafa Sabri were the founding members of Cemiyet-i Müderrisin. They were fiercely against the national government in Ankara which led the Turks to the Turkish War of Independence. He referred to Turkish Nationalists as rabid bandits. His father was a Turk from the Akkoyunlu Bayındır tribe, while his mother was an Arab originally from Hijaz.

In 1924, before the westernization movement in Turkey, he wrote a book titled Frenk Mukallitliği ve Şapka (Westernization and the [European] Hat). In it he advocated Sharia law and opposed what he called western influences, such as "Alcohol, Prostitution, Theater, Dance" and the "western hat". From his viewpoint, the western hat was a symbol of the infidels, and wearing a hat would make Muslims lose their Islamic identity. "The Hat Act" was passed on 25 November 1925 by Atatürk, which ordered that no other headgear except the western hat was allowed thus banning wearing the fez.

He was arrested and sent to Ankara on 26 December 1925, where he stood trial on 26 January 1926. The prosecutor demanded three years imprisonment, but the court postponed the trial to the next day. The next day, the Hoca declared that he no longer desired to defend himself. He was sentenced to death and hanged on 4 February 1926.

== Views on Western civilization ==
In his book Medeniyet-i Şer'iyye ve Terakkiyat-ı Diniyye (The Civilization of the Sharia and Religious Progress), he presents his views on what is beneficial and what is not in Western civilization:

Materially and spiritually, the Western civilization has two aspects, one of which is useful and one of which is harmful to humanity. The hadiths of our Prophet clearly allow and encourage the adoption of useful innovations of Western civilization by Muslims: "If one person invents something beautiful and this invention becomes useful to the people, this inventor would be blessed by God until the Day of Judgment," and, "You (people) know better the worldly matters.“ These hadiths clearly show that the Islamic religion does not forbid good and utilitarian inventions that will benefit the Muslim community and ensure its progress. The use of all tools and skills – from the sewing needle to railroads, artillery, iron-clad warships and dreadnoughts, airplanes, and instruments of communication, land and sea trade, various arts and crafts, factories, agricultural tools and any other useful invention – is condoned and recommended in Islam. To prepare the ground for these inventions, Islam in fact orders the education of every individual, male and female. As understood from the works of European sociologist Gustave Le Bon, industry, like other aspects of civilization, was first instituted six or seven thousand years ago in Asia by the Assyrians, later moving to Egypt. The development of early Greek art is due to the influence of the civilizations of the Tigris and the Nile. Thanks to this favorable attitude towards science and scholarship, Muslims adopted the scientific discoveries of the earlier civilizations of Egypt and Greece, and later surpassed these civilizations by excelling in the arts and sciences.

As a consequence of crusades to Muslim countries, [European] Crusaders brought Islamic arts to Europe. This prepared the ground for the rise and blossoming of European art. Europeans marvelled at the radiant splendor of the Andalusian civilization in Iberia [Spain and Portugal]. In these ages [early Middle Ages], western Europeans had languished in a miserable condition, living in savagery, ignorance, and darkness. The origins of Western civilization are, therefore, found in Eastern civilization.

Despite this, Islam inaugurated a new era for the development of the useful aspects of progress and created a wonderful civilization. One could wonder why today's Muslims are deprived of these high values. We believe that the most obvious answer is because they neglected one of the important requirements of the Muslim religion: to work in order to earn. Muslims could benefit from their religion only by living their life, conducting their business and acting according to the high principles of Islam and applying them faithfully. If Muslims keep these principles only in books and other documents and do not actually apply them to their daily life, they cannot benefit from them. The Prophet Muhammad said: "some knowledge is like ignorance.“ Knowledge that is not put into practice is no different from the lack of knowledge. The learned person who does not use this knowledge cannot distance himself from the common people. It is clear that the Islamic religion allows and encourages the good and beneficial aspects of Western civilization, and forbids the decadent, immoral, vice-prone and ugly side of it (such as unbelief [atheism], oppression, prostitution, gambling, drinking alcohol, or dancing). Islam prohibits the immoral aspects of Western civilization, such as bars, theatres, brothels and gambling dens. Therefore, it is strictly forbidden in Islam to imitate the Western lifestyle and live like non-Muslims. In fact, Western civilization is far from being a model civilization for humanity to adopt, since it does not take an interest in the moral aspects and spiritual happiness of humanity, but focuses only on material gains and encourages mankind's animal instincts.

== Memorial and film ==
There is a small memorial in İskilip and in 1993 a film about him, İskilipli Atıf Hoca / Kelebekler Sonsuza Uçar (Turkish), was released.
