= Lenger (disambiguation) =

Lenger is a city in Kazakhstan.

Lenger may also refer to:

- Lenger, Bozyazı, village in Mersin Province, Turkey

== People with the surname ==
- Blaž Lenger (1919–2006), Croatian singer
- Frédérique Lenger (1921–2005), Belgian mathematics educator
