= Yeşilçat =

Yeşilçat can refer to:

- Yeşilçat, Bayat
- Yeşilçat, Dinar
- Yeşilçat, Erzincan
