= Gülnar Hatun =

Gülnar
- Khatun
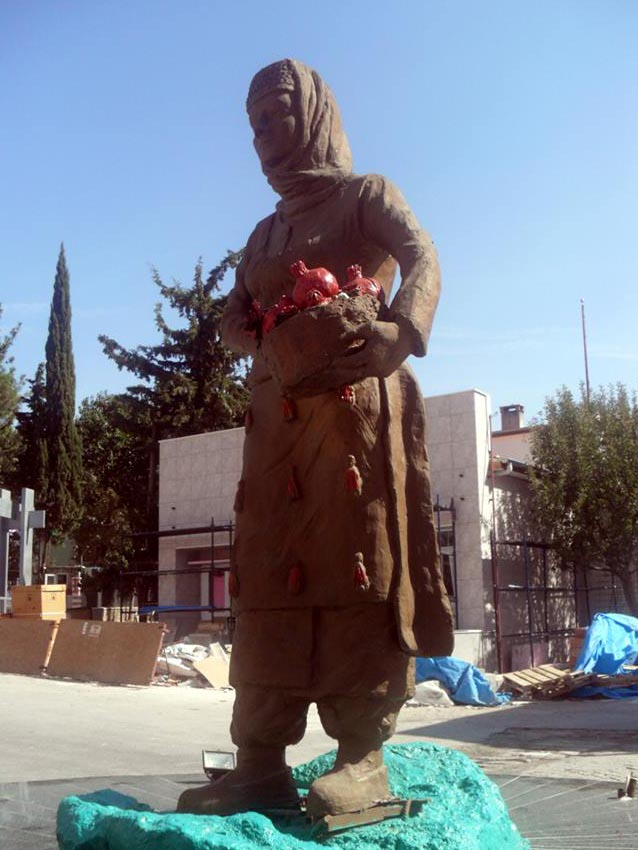
- Gülnar Hatun sculpture in Gülnar
- Born: 731; Merv
- Died: 769; Gülek Pass, Al-'Awasim
Posthumous name
- Büyük Ece
- House: Ashina
- Father: Yahşi Bey
- Mother: Duru Han

Gülnar Hatun (aka Büyük Ece, c. 731-769) was a semi legendary Turkic woman. (Hatun is actually a title meaning "lady".) Very little is known for certain about her.

== Life ==
She was born in 731 to Yahşi and his wife Duru. According to unsourced claims the family descended from a branch of Göktürk family. Her family was in the Dörtkuyu village close to Merv, what is now in Turkmenistan. Merv was under Umayyad rule and the Turks in Merv were fighting against forced proselytising. Both Gülnar's and her fiancé Yirbağı's fathers were killed by Umayyad general Nasr ibn Sayyar during the reign of Caliph Marwan II. Although Umayyads were replaced by the Abbasids in 750, during the early years of the Abbasid rule Abbasid policy was not much different than that of the Umayyad. After Yırbağı was also killed, Gülnar with a large partisan group escaped to Al-'Awasim, a buffer region between the Abbasid and the Byzantine Empires, what is now in south Turkey. In al Awasim, Gülnar began fighting against Abbasids and in 769 she too was killed during a clash around Gülek Pass (Cilician Gates of the antiquity).

== Legacy ==
In 1950 the Turkmen town Hanaypazar in Mersin Province was renamed Gülnar. Now Gülnar is a district center. According to one view the town (now neighborhood of Gülnar) Büyükeceli was also named after Gülnar Hatun (also known as Büyük Ece).
