= Emirhacı, Gülnar =

Emirhacı
- Neighbourhood
- Location in Turkey
- Coordinates: 36°16′34″N 33°26′53″E
- Country: Turkey
- Province: Mersin
- District: Gülnar
- Elevation: 530 m (1,740 ft)
- Population (2022): 70
- Time zone: UTC+3 (TRT)
- Postal code: 33702
- Area code: 0324

Emirhacı is a neighbourhood in the municipality and district of Gülnar, Mersin Province, Turkey. Its population is 70 (2022). The village is situated in the Toros Mountains and to the south of Gülnar. The distance to Gülnar is 10 kilometres (6.2 mi) and to Mersin is 160 kilometres (99 mi). Emirhacı was a part of Beydili village up to 1953 when it was declared a village. The ancient (Luvian) castle Meydancık is situated to the west of the village.
