= Arsinoe (Cilicia) =

Ancient city on the coast of Cilicia

Coordinates: 36°05′33″N 33°01′20″E

Arsinoe (Ancient Greek: Ἀρσινόη) was a city on the coast of ancient Cilicia between Anemurium and Kelenderis; the site is near the modern city of Bozyazı, Mersin Province, Turkey. Strabo mentions Arsinoe as having a port. In the 19th century, William Martin Leake placed it at or near the ruined modern castle, called Softa Kalesi (Sokhta Kálesi), just west of Bozyazı, below which is a port, such as Strabo describes at Arsinoe, and a peninsula on the east side of the harbor covered with ruins. This modern site is east of Anemurium, and west of, and near to, Kızil Burnu (Cape Kizliman).

The city was founded by Aetos, a Strategos of king, Ptolemy Philadelphus, and named for Arsinoe II of Egypt, the sister and wife of Ptolemy. The city of Nagidos, on whose territory Arsinoe was founded, initially protested against the new foundation. The conflict was resolved by declaring Arsinoe the daughter city of Nagidos. See Nagidos#The Hellenistic period and the foundation of Arsinoe.

The site of Arsinoe is located near modern an archaeological site named Maraş Harabeleri about 4 kilometres (2.5 mi) east of Bozyazı in Anatolia.
