= Hacıbayram =

Hacıbayram can refer to:

- Hacıbayram, Bayat
- Hacıbayram, Karayazı
- Hacıbayram, Tercan
