= Softa Castle =

Archaeological site in Turkey

- Part of Arsinoe
- Mersin Province, Turkey
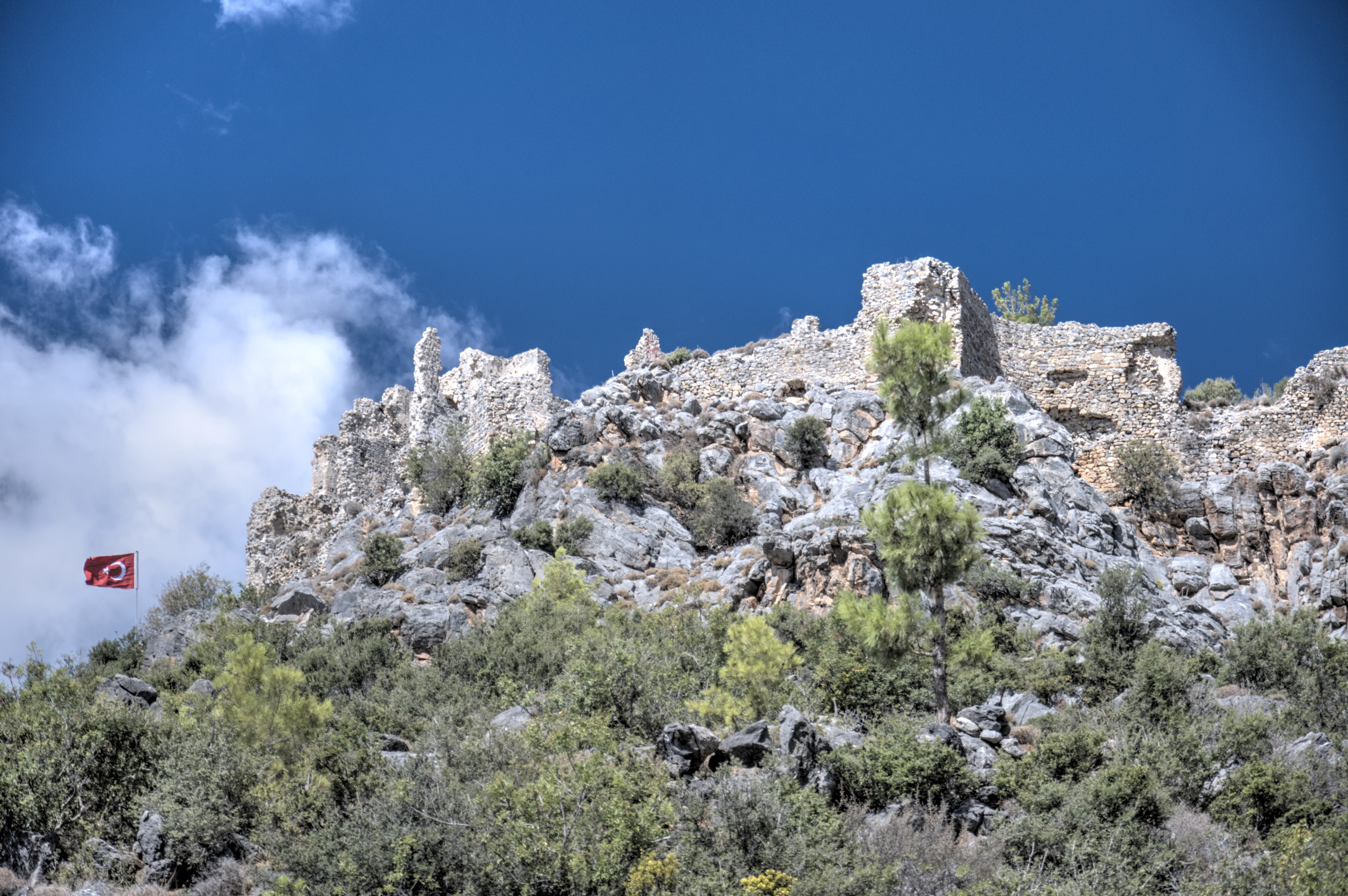

Site information
- Type: Fortress
- Open to the public: Yes

Location
- Location within Turkey
- Coordinates: 36°06′16″N 33°01′02″E

Site history
- Built by: Roman Empire
- Demolished: Most of it

Softa Castle (Turkish: Softa Kalesi) is a ruined castle in Bozyazı ilçe (district) of Mersin Province, Turkey.

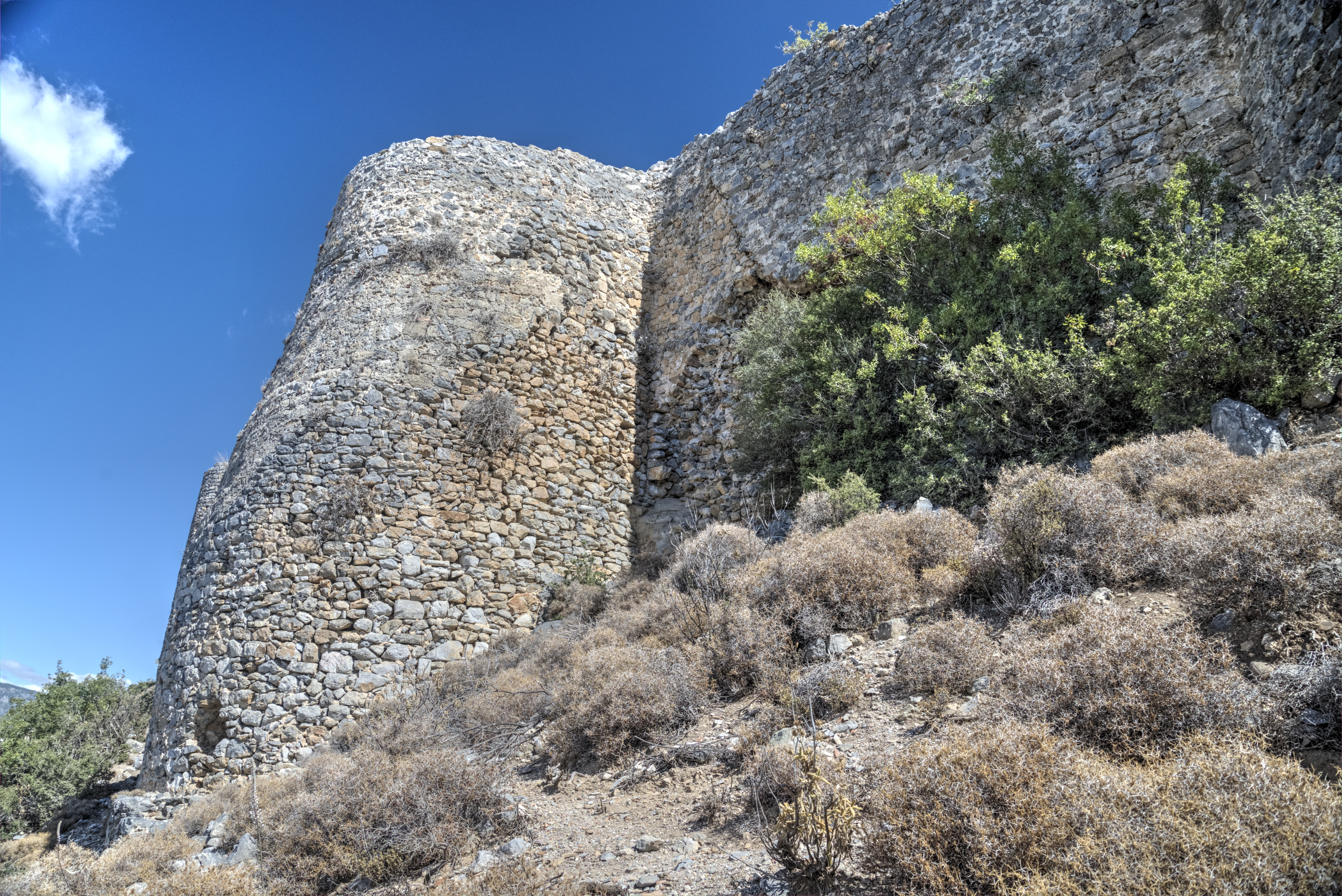
Softa Castle, a ruined castle in Mersin Province of Turkey

== Geography ==
The castle, to the east of Bozyazı district center is situated on a hill of 140 metres (460 ft) high and close to Turkish state highway D400. However, the road doesn't reach the castle. Visitors have to walk up the last 200 metres (660 ft) course. The distance to Bozyazı is only 4 kilometres (2.5 mi) and to Mersin is 212 kilometres (132 mi).

== History ==
The castle was built in late Roman times. Its original name was Sycae (Greek: Συκαὶ), and continued to be used under the Byzantine Empire. In the first half of the 13th century, it was captured by the Atabeg Ertokuş of the Seljuk Turks. It was also used during the Karamanid era (up to mid 15th century). In the 1470s it was captured by Gedik Ahmet Pasha of the Ottoman Empire.

== Archaeology ==
It is an oval shaped castle where the narrowest diameter is about 80 metres (260 ft). The ruins out of the castle spread out to ancient Arsinoe. In the southern slopes of the hill there are graves. The portal is on the west rampart. In the castle there are ruins of a palace, a bath, several cisterns and a mosque.

== In popular culture ==
According to a popular belief, there is an underground connection between Softa Castle and Mamure Castle to the west, which so far is not proven. The distance between the two castles is about 10 kilometres (6.2 mi). Another belief is that the castle is protected by snakes.
