= Mandane (Cilicia) =

Ancient city in Cilicia

Coordinates: 36°07′38″N 33°06′44″E

Mandane (Ancient Greek: Μανδάνη) was a town on the coast of ancient Cilicia, between Celenderis, and Cape Pisidium or Posidium (modern Kızıl Burun), from which it was only 7 stadia distant. William Smith conjectured it to be the same place as the Myanda or Mysanda mentioned by Pliny the Elder; and if so, it must also be identical with the town of Myus (Μυούς) mentioned in the Periplus of Pseudo-Scylax between Nagidus and Celenderis. Modern scholarship does not accept the identity.

Mandane is located near Akyaka in Asiatic Turkey.
