= Üçoluk =

Üçoluk may refer to the following places in Turkey:

- Üçoluk, Gülnar
- Üçoluk, Konyaaltı
- Üçoluk, Sungurlu
