= Babadıl Islands =

Two small Mediterranean islands in Turkey

Native name: Babadıl Adaları
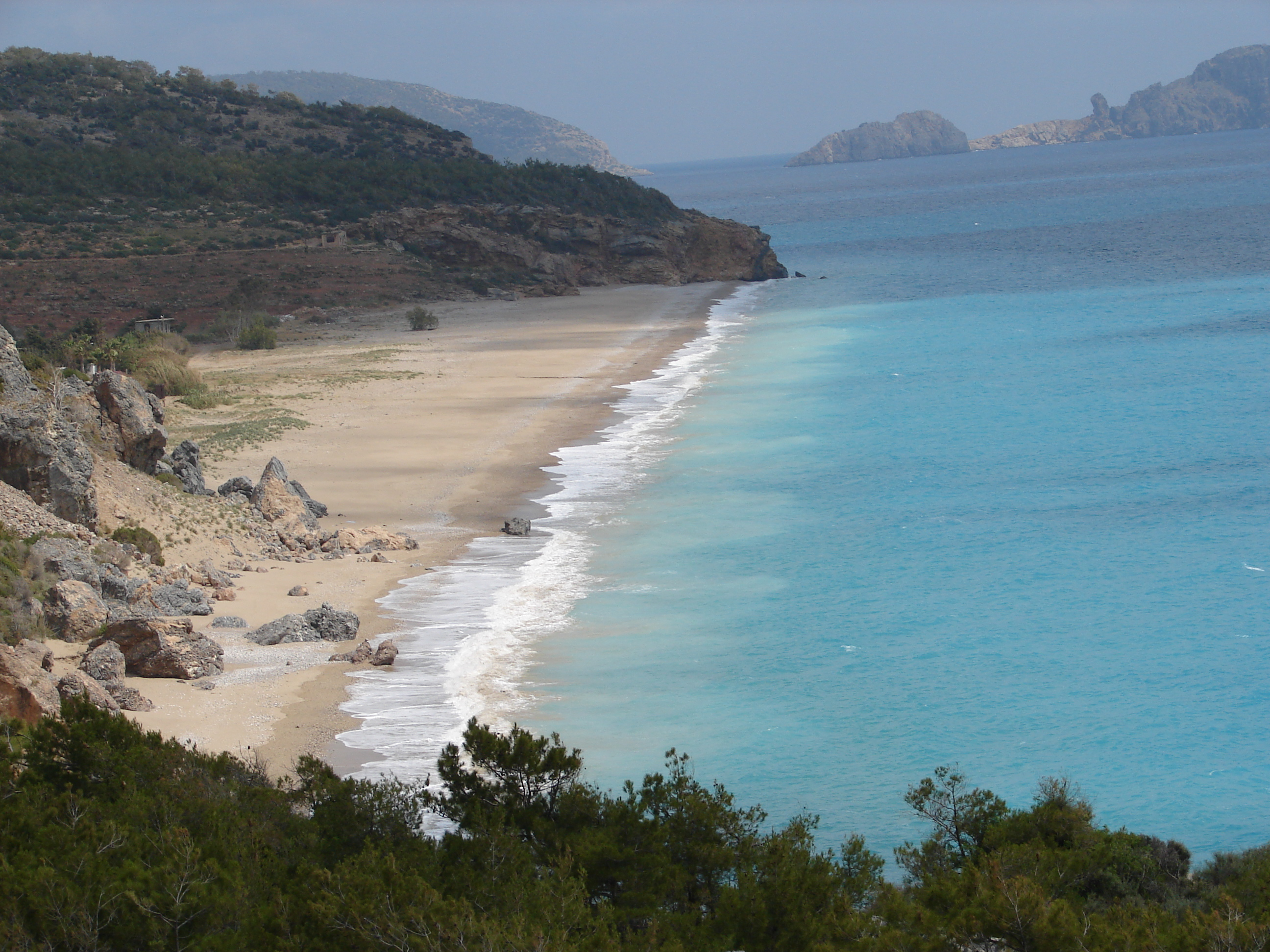
- From west to east

- Location within Turkey

Geography
- Location: Mediterranean Sea
- Coordinates: 36°07′N 33°31′E

Administration
- Turkey
- İl (province): Mersin Province
- İlçe: Gülnar

Babadıl Islands (a.k.a. Beşparmak Islands) are two small Mediterranean islands in Turkey. They are named after the former name of the village Sipahili in the mainland facing the islands. According to the British captain Francis Beaufort who was tasked to map the Mediterranean coasts of Turkey in 1811–12, the names of the islands were Papadoulae, in the antiquity. Modern scholarship identifies the island group with Akonesiai, and the northern island with ancient Crambusa or Krambousa (Κράμβουσα).

The islands are about 600 metres (2,000 ft) offshore in Gülnar ilçe (district) of Mersin Province at 36°07′N 33°31′E. The distance from the coast to Gülnar is about 30 kilometres (19 mi) and to Mersin is 140 kilometres (87 mi). They are in the eastern end of a bay and are observable from the Turkish state highway D.400 which runs mostly along the sea side. The north to south dimension of the northern island is 400 metres (1,300 ft) and the north to south dimension of the southern island is 500 metres (1,600 ft). Both islands are uninhabited. But there are remains of a castle and some vaulted tombs from the Medieval Age.
