= Narince =

Narince may refer to:

- Narince (grape), a variety of grape used in Turkish winemaking
- Narince, Bozyazı, a village in Bozyazı district of Mersin Province, Turkey
- Narince, Kahta, a village in the district of Kahta, Adıyaman Province, Turkey
