= Tevekli =

Tevekli can refer to:

- Tevekli, Bayat
- Tevekli, Ergani
