= Çukuröz =

Çukuröz can refer to:

- Çukuröz, Bayat
- Çukuröz, Eldivan
