= Mollaömerli =

- Neighbourhood
- Location in Turkey
- Coordinates: 36°19′N 33°26′E
- Country: Turkey
- Province: Mersin
- District: Gülnar
- Elevation: 890 m (2,920 ft)
- Population (2022): 111
- Time zone: UTC+3 (TRT)
- Postal code: 33702
- Area code: 0324

Mollaömerli is a neighbourhood in the municipality and district of Gülnar, Mersin Province, Turkey. Its population is 111 (2022). It is situated in a plateau of Toros Mountains between Gülnar and Büyükeceli. Its distance to Gülnar is only 6 kilometres (3.7 mi) and to Mersin is 156 kilometres (97 mi). The village was founded in 1850. Main economic activity is farming. Various vegetables are produced.
