= Örtülü, Gülnar =

Örtülü
- Neighbourhood
- Location in Turkey
- Coordinates: 36°26′N 33°25′E
- Country: Turkey
- Province: Mersin
- District: Gülnar
- Elevation: 690 m (2,260 ft)
- Population (2022): 215
- Time zone: UTC+3 (TRT)
- Postal code: 33702
- Area code: 0324

Örtülü is a neighbourhood in the municipality and district of Gülnar, Mersin Province, Turkey. Its population is 215 (2022). It is situated in the forests of Toros Mountains to the north of Gülnar. Its distance to Gülnar is 15 kilometres (9.3 mi) and to Mersin is 165 kilometres (103 mi). Main economic activities of the village is ovine breeding and agriculture.
