= Gezende =

- Neighbourhood
- Location in Turkey
- Coordinates: 36°31′N 33°10′E
- Country: Turkey
- Province: Mersin
- District: Gülnar
- Elevation: 655 m (2,149 ft)
- Population (2022): 342
- Time zone: UTC+3 (TRT)
- Postal code: 33702
- Area code: 0324

Gezende is a neighbourhood in the municipality and district of Gülnar, Mersin Province, Turkey. Its population is 342 (2022). Distance to Gülnar is 45 kilometres (28 mi) and to Mersin is 195 kilometres (121 mi). Göksu River flows just north of the village and the Gezende Dam with 159 MW power is to the northeast of the village. The area of the artificial lake is 3.97 square kilometres (1.53 sq mi).

== History ==
There are ruins dated back to Seljuks (12th-13th centuries). According to town page, there were four guest houses in the village. Such houses imply that there were Middle age education institutions in the village.

== Economy ==
The village enjoys irrigated farming. Plums and other fruits as well as vegetables are produced. Another economic activity is beehiving (thyme honey).
