= Halifeler, Gülnar =

Halifeler
- Neighbourhood
- Location in Turkey
- Coordinates: 36°15′N 33°11′E
- Country: Turkey
- Province: Mersin
- District: Gülnar
- Elevation: 890 m (2,920 ft)
- Population (2022): 44
- Time zone: UTC+3 (TRT)
- Postal code: 33702
- Area code: 0324

Halifeler is a neighbourhood in the municipality and district of Gülnar, Mersin Province, Turkey. Its population is 44 (2022). The village is situated in the Toros Mountains. The distance to Gülnar is 35 kilometres (22 mi) and to Mersin is 185 kilometres (115 mi).
