= Tekeli, Bozyazı =

Settlement in Turkey

Tekeli
- Neighbourhood
- Location within Turkey
- Coordinates: 36°09′N 33°08′E
- Country: Turkey
- Province: Mersin
- District: Bozyazı
- Elevation: 50 m (160 ft)
- Population (2022): 3,127
- Time zone: UTC+3 (TRT)
- Area code: 0324

Tekeli is a neighbourhood in the municipality and district of Bozyazı, Mersin Province, Turkey. Its population is 3,127 (2022). Before the 2013 reorganisation, it was a town (belde).

== Geography ==
Tekeli is situated on a small coastal plain surrounded by the Toros Mountains. It lies on the Datça Mersin highway which runs parallel to the Mediterranean coast. Tekeli is 15 km (9 mi) away from Bozyazı and 186 km (116 mi) away from Mersin.

== History ==
The territory around Tekeli was ruled in turn by Hittites, Lydians, Persians, Greeks, Romans, Byzantines and Armenians. In 1225, it was annexed by the Seljuks and after the disintegration of Seljuks, it fell to the Karamanids. Finally in 1466 it was incorporated into the Ottoman Empire. According to the municipality, the name of the town refers to historical Turkmen tribe of Teke which is also known as the founder of Teke Beylik. The Teke Turkmens migrated from Turkestan to South West Anatolia (Antalya region) in the 13th century. Between the 16th and 18th centuries a part of the nomadic Teke people migrated to the present location. The village was founded in 1864. After the First World War the village was briefly occupied by Italian Army. But during the Turkish War of Independence the town became a part of Turkey on 21 May 1921. In 1987, it was declared a township.

== Economy ==
The most pronounced economic activity in Tekeli is greenhouse agriculture. Bananas, peanuts and all kinds of citrus fruits are also produced. The touristic (beach) potential of the town is also promising.
