= Bereket, Gülnar =

Bereket
- Neighbourhood
- Location in Turkey
- Coordinates: 36°21′N 33°15′E
- Country: Turkey
- Province: Mersin
- District: Gülnar
- Elevation: 1,150 m (3,770 ft)
- Population (2022): 369
- Time zone: UTC+3 (TRT)
- Postal code: 33702
- Area code: 0324

Bereket is a neighbourhood in the municipality and district of Gülnar, Mersin Province, Turkey. Its population is 369 (2022). It is situated in the mountainous area to the west of Gülnar. The distance to Gülnar is 16 kilometres (9.9 mi) and to Mersin is 176 kilometres (109 mi).
