= Bozağaç, Gülnar =

Bozağaç
- Neighbourhood
- Location in Turkey
- Coordinates: 36°17′N 33°23′E
- Country: Turkey
- Province: Mersin
- District: Gülnar
- Elevation: 760 m (2,490 ft)
- Population (2022): 184
- Time zone: UTC+3 (TRT)
- Postal code: 33702
- Area code: 0324

Bozağaç is a neighbourhood in the municipality and district of Gülnar, Mersin Province, Turkey. Its population is 184 (2022). It is situated to the south of Gülnar. The distance to Gülnar is 8 kilometres (5.0 mi) and to Mersin is 163 kilometres (101 mi).
