= Ilısu, Gülnar =

Ilısu Avurga
- Neighbourhood
- Location in Turkey
- Coordinates: 36°34′N 33°05′E
- Country: Turkey
- Province: Mersin
- District: Gülnar
- Elevation: 675 m (2,215 ft)
- Population (2022): 272
- Time zone: UTC+3 (TRT)
- Postal code: 33702
- Area code: 0324

Ilısu (Avurga) is a neighbourhood in the municipality and district of Gülnar, Mersin Province, Turkey. Its population is 272 (2022). The village is 60 kilometres (37 mi) from Gülnar and 210 kilometres (130 mi) from Mersin. The small Ilısu waterfall is 1.5 kilometres (0.93 mi) south east of the village.

Avurga was founded in 1850 as a hamlet of the nearby village Ilısu. But after a landslide in the main village in 1981, Ilısu residents also moved to Avurga and the village was renamed Ilısu.
