= Çukurkonak, Gülnar =

Çukurkonak (Uluhtu)
- Neighbourhood
- Location in Turkey
- Coordinates: 36°23′N 33°20′E
- Country: Turkey
- Province: Mersin
- District: Gülnar
- Elevation: 1,100 m (3,600 ft)
- Population (2022): 196
- Time zone: UTC+3 (TRT)
- Postal code: 33702
- Area code: 0324

Çukurkonak (formerly Uluhtu) is a neighbourhood in the municipality and district of Gülnar, Mersin Province, Turkey. Its population is 196 (2022). The village is situated in the Taurus Mountains. The distance to Gülnar is 14 kilometres (8.7 mi) and to Mersin is 161 kilometres (100 mi).
