= Arıkuyusu =

- Neighbourhood
- Location in Turkey
- Coordinates: 36°26′N 33°28′E
- Country: Turkey
- Province: Mersin
- District: Gülnar
- Elevation: 770 m (2,530 ft)
- Population (2022): 538
- Time zone: UTC+3 (TRT)
- Postal code: 33702
- Area code: 0324

Arıkuyusu is a neighbourhood in the municipality and district of Gülnar, Mersin Province, Turkey. Its population is 538 (2022). It is situated in the Taurus Mountains, to the north of Gülnar. The distance to Gülnar is 15 kilometres (9.3 mi) and to Mersin is 163 kilometres (101 mi).
