= Ulupınar, Gülnar =

Ulupınar
- Neighbourhood
- Location in Turkey
- Coordinates: 36°16′N 33°35′E
- Country: Turkey
- Province: Mersin
- District: Gülnar
- Elevation: 670 m (2,200 ft)
- Population (2022): 243
- Time zone: UTC+3 (TRT)
- Postal code: 33702
- Area code: 0324

Ulupınar is a neighbourhood in the municipality and district of Gülnar, Mersin Province, Turkey. Its population is 243 (2022). It is in the Toros Mountains. Its distance to Gülnar is 28 kilometres (17 mi) and to Mersin is 140 kilometres (87 mi). According to oral tradition the former name of the village was Katarcalı, referring to a well known family of the village. But the name was confused with Katırcalı and the villagers renamed the village.
