= Korucuk, Gülnar =

Korucuk
- Neighbourhood
- Location in Turkey
- Coordinates: 36°19′N 33°32′E
- Country: Turkey
- Province: Mersin
- District: Gülnar
- Elevation: 545 m (1,788 ft)
- Population (2022): 172
- Time zone: UTC+3 (TRT)
- Postal code: 33702
- Area code: 0324

Korucuk is a neighbourhood in the municipality and district of Gülnar, Mersin Province, Turkey. Its population is 172 (2022). The village is situated in Toros Mountains. Its distance to Gülnar is 18 kilometres (11 mi) and to Mersin is 149 kilometres (93 mi).

Although there are several theories about the origin of the village name, the most plausible is that it refers to forests around the village (Koru means a "small forest") There are ancient rock tombs around the village and the ruins of an ancient church in the village. The ancestors of the present residents however were migrants from Central Asia. Major economic activity is agriculture. There is no shortage in irrigation water and the village produces fresh vegetables.
