= Tepekutuğun, Bayat =

Village in Turkey

Tepekutuğun
- Village
- Location in Turkey
- Coordinates: 40°37′38″N 34°09′47″E
- Country: Turkey
- Province: Çorum
- District: Bayat
- Population (2022): 464
- Time zone: UTC+3 (TRT)

Tepekutuğun is a village in the Bayat District of Çorum Province in Turkey. Its population is 464 (2022).
