= İleği, Bayat =

Village in Turkey

İleği
- Village
- Country: Turkey
- Province: Çorum
- District: Bayat
- Population (2022): 122
- Time zone: UTC+3 (TRT)

İleği is a village in the Bayat District of Çorum Province in Turkey. Its population is 122 (2022).
