= Tekedüzü =

- Neighbourhood
- Location in Turkey
- Coordinates: 36°08′N 33°01′E
- Country: Turkey
- Province: Mersin
- District: Bozyazı
- Elevation: 530 m (1,740 ft)
- Population (2022): 35
- Time zone: UTC+3 (TRT)
- Area code: 0324

Tekedüzü is a neighbourhood in the municipality and district of Bozyazı, Mersin Province, Turkey. Its population is 35 (2022). It is situated to the northeast of Bozyazı. The distance to Bozyazı is 6 kilometres (3.7 mi) and the distance to Mersin is 205 kilometres (127 mi). The village is inhabited by Tahtacı.
