= Çerkeş, Bayat =

Village in Turkey

Çerkeş
- Village
- Country: Turkey
- Province: Çorum
- District: Bayat
- Population (2022): 221
- Time zone: UTC+3 (TRT)

Çerkeş is a village in the Bayat District of Çorum Province in Turkey. Its population is 221 (2022).
