= Eskialibey, Bayat =

Village in Turkey

Eskialibey
- Village
- Location in Turkey
- Coordinates: 40°32′05″N 34°08′54″E
- Country: Turkey
- Province: Çorum
- District: Bayat
- Population (2022): 438
- Time zone: UTC+3 (TRT)

Eskialibey is a village in the Bayat District of Çorum Province in Turkey. Its population is 438 (2022). Before the 2013 reorganisation, it was a town (belde).
