= Konur, Gülnar =

Konur
- Neighbourhood
- Location in Turkey
- Coordinates: 36°23′N 33°17′E
- Country: Turkey
- Province: Mersin
- District: Gülnar
- Elevation: 1,130 m (3,710 ft)
- Population (2022): 387
- Time zone: UTC+3 (TRT)
- Postal code: 33702
- Area code: 0324

Konur is a neighbourhood in the municipality and district of Gülnar, Mersin Province, Turkey. Its population is 387 (2022). It is situated to the northwest of Gülnar. Its distance to Gülnar is 31 kilometres (19 mi) and to Mersin is 181 kilometres (112 mi).
