= Dedeler, Gülnar =

Dedeler
- Neighbourhood
- Location in Turkey
- Coordinates: 36°16′N 33°37′E
- Country: Turkey
- Province: Mersin
- District: Gülnar
- Elevation: 740 m (2,430 ft)
- Population (2022): 325
- Time zone: UTC+3 (TRT)
- Postal code: 33702
- Area code: 0324

Dedeler is a neighbourhood in the municipality and district of Gülnar, Mersin Province, Turkey. Its population is 325 (2022), and is situated to the west of Kızlardağ in the Taurus Mountains system. The distance to Gülnar is 31 kilometres (19 mi) and to Mersin is 160 kilometres (99 mi). The name of the village Dedeler ("saints") refers to a Muslim preacher named Arap Dede. The main economic activities of the village are viticulture and beekeeping.
