= Kunduzlu, Bayat =

Village in Turkey

Kunduzlu
- Village
- Location in Turkey
- Coordinates: 40.7419°N 34.2136°E
- Country: Turkey
- Province: Çorum
- District: Bayat
- Population (2022): 441
- Time zone: UTC+3 (TRT)

Kunduzlu is a village in the Bayat District of Çorum Province in Turkey. Its population is 441 (2022). Before the 2013 reorganisation, it was a town (belde).
