= Kavakoluğu, Gülnar =

Kavakoluğu
- Neighbourhood
- Location in Turkey
- Coordinates: 36°17′N 33°31′E
- Country: Turkey
- Province: Mersin
- District: Gülnar
- Elevation: 505 m (1,657 ft)
- Population (2022): 51
- Time zone: UTC+3 (TRT)
- Postal code: 33702
- Area code: 0324

Kavakoluğu is a neighbourhood in the municipality and district of Gülnar, Mersin Province, Turkey. Its population is 51 (2022). It is situated in Toros Mountains. Distance to Gülnar is 16 kilometres (9.9 mi) and to Mersin is 150 kilometres (93 mi). Main economic activity of the village is agriculture. But the arable land is limited. Various fruits including olive and citrus are produced. There is a lignite mine around the village. But at the present it is not active.
