= Bayan, Bayat =

Village in Turkey

Bayan
- Village
- Location in Turkey
- Coordinates: 40°34′53″N 34°06′25″E
- Country: Turkey
- Province: Çorum
- District: Bayat
- Population (2022): 122
- Time zone: UTC+3 (TRT)

Bayan is a village in the Bayat District of Çorum Province in Turkey. Its population is 122 (2022).
