= Tırnak, Gülnar =

Tırnak
- Neighbourhood
- Location in Turkey
- Coordinates: 36°17′N 33°26′E
- Country: Turkey
- Province: Mersin
- District: Gülnar
- Elevation: 585 m (1,919 ft)
- Population (2022): 123
- Time zone: UTC+3 (TRT)
- Postal code: 33702
- Area code: 0324

Tırnak is a neighborhood in the municipality and district of Gülnar, Mersin Province, Turkey. Its population is 123 (2022). It is situated in Toros Mountains. Distance to Gülnar is 8 kilometres (5.0 mi) and to Mersin is 140 kilometres (87 mi).
