= Bolyaran =

- Neighbourhood
- Location in Turkey
- Coordinates: 36°24′N 33°08′E
- Country: Turkey
- Province: Mersin
- District: Gülnar
- Elevation: 1,350 m (4,430 ft)
- Population (2022): 59
- Time zone: UTC+3 (TRT)
- Postal code: 33702
- Area code: 0324

Bolyaran is a neighbourhood in the municipality and district of Gülnar, Mersin Province, Turkey. Its population is 59 (2022). It is situated to the west of a turpentine tree forest. The distance to Gülnar is 40 kilometres (25 mi) and to Mersin is 195 kilometres (121 mi).
