= Bahçekoyağı =

- Neighbourhood
- Location in Turkey
- Coordinates: 36°13′N 33°05′E
- Country: Turkey
- Province: Mersin
- District: Bozyazı
- Elevation: 190 m (620 ft)
- Population (2022): 114
- Time zone: UTC+3 (TRT)
- Area code: 0324

Bahçekoyağı is a neighbourhood in the municipality and district of Bozyazı, Mersin Province, Turkey. Its population is 114 (2022). It is situated to the northeast of Bozyazı. The distance to Bozyazı is 20 kilometres (12 mi) and the distance to Mersin is 205 kilometres (127 mi). The village is inhabited by Tahtacı.
