= Gözsüzce =

- Neighbourhood
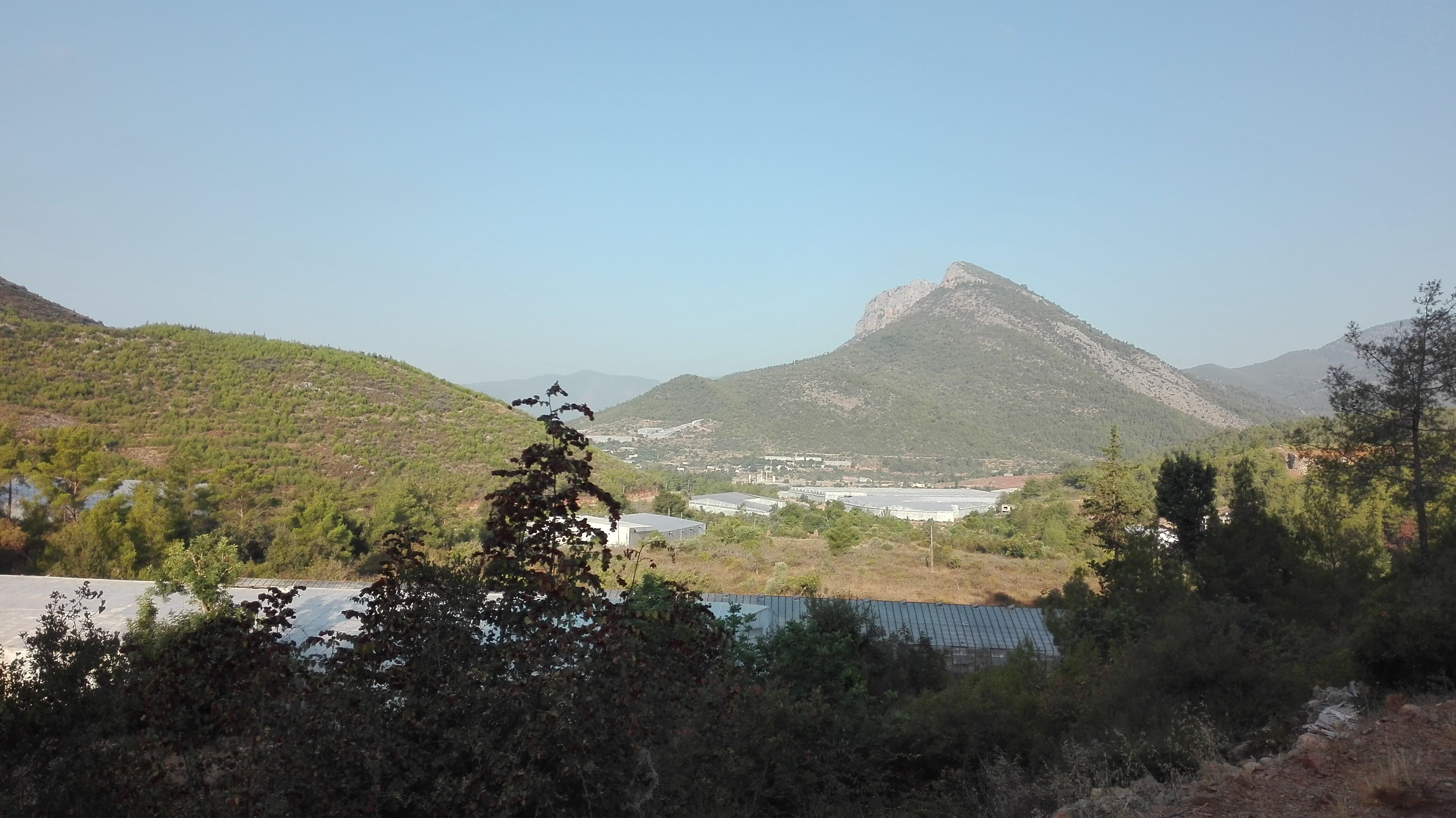
- Gözsüzce from North-East

- Location within Turkey
- Coordinates: 36°08′N 33°11′E
- Country: Turkey
- Province: Mersin
- District: Bozyazı
- Elevation: 5 m (16 ft)
- Population (2022): 217
- Time zone: UTC+3 (TRT)
- Area code: 0324

Gözsüzce is a neighbourhood in the municipality and district of Bozyazı, Mersin Province, Turkey. Its population is 217 (2022). It is a coastal village situated on Turkish state highway D.400, which connects Mersin to Antalya. The distance to Bozyazı is 17 kilometres (11 mi) and the distance to Mersin is 182 kilometres (113 mi). The main economic activity of the village is farming and the major crop is bananas.
