= Gözce =

- Neighbourhood
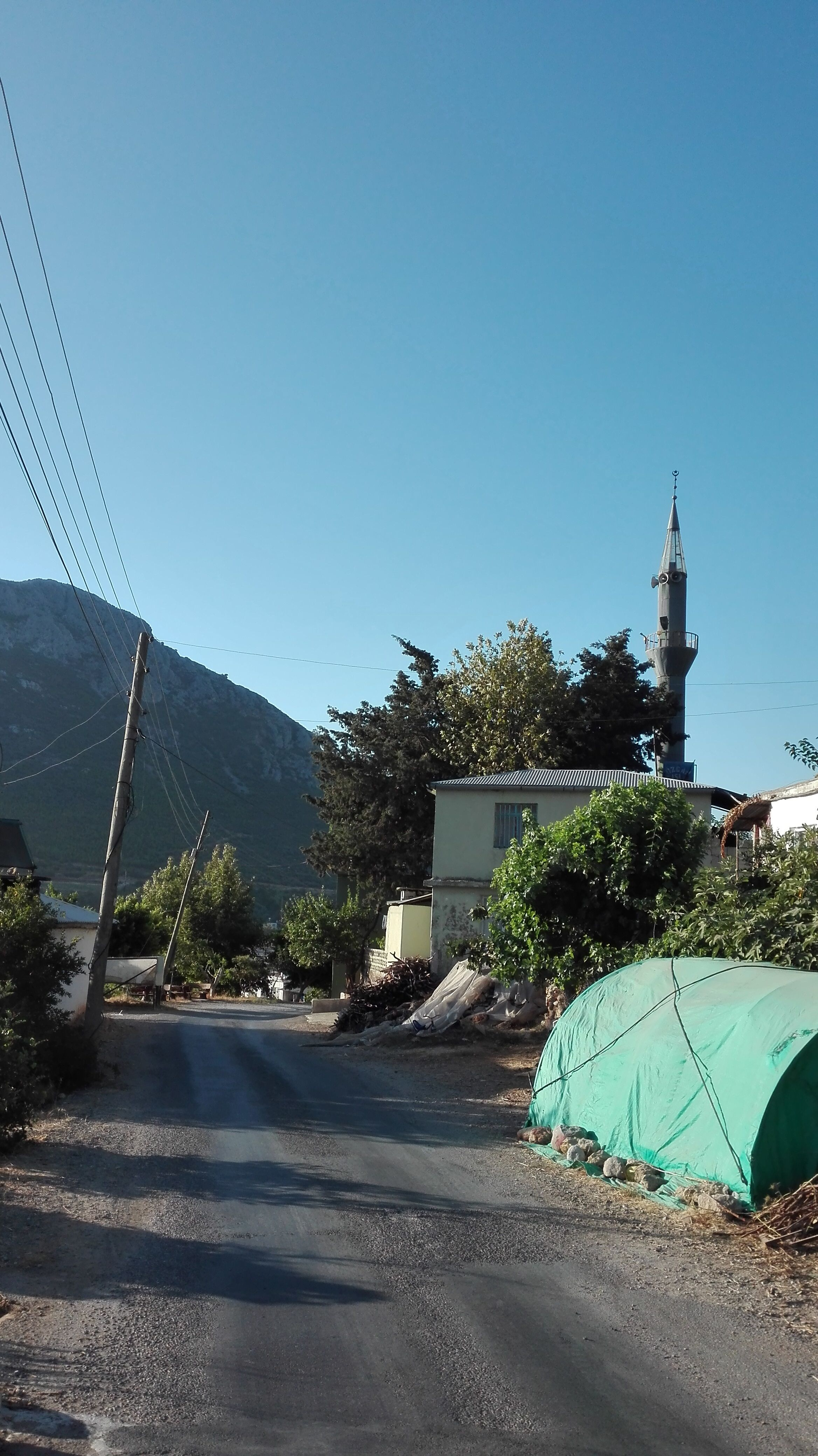
- Gözce mosque

- Location within Turkey
- Coordinates: 36°09′N 33°11′E
- Country: Turkey
- Province: Mersin
- District: Bozyazı
- Elevation: 25 m (82 ft)
- Population (2022): 845
- Time zone: UTC+3 (TRT)
- Area code: 0324

Gözce is a neighbourhood in the municipality and district of Bozyazı, Mersin Province, Turkey. Its population is 845 (2022). It is situated at the west bank of a creek and about 1 kilometre (0.62 mi) north of the Mediterranean Sea coast. The state highway D.400 is at the south of the village. The distance to Bozyazı is 20 kilometres (12 mi) and the distance to Mersin is 200 kilometres (120 mi).
