= Şeyhömer, Gülnar =

Şeyhömer
- Neighbourhood
- Location in Turkey
- Coordinates: 36°20′N 33°18′E
- Country: Turkey
- Province: Mersin
- District: Gülnar
- Elevation: 1,000 m (3,300 ft)
- Population (2022): 486
- Time zone: UTC+3 (TRT)
- Postal code: 33702
- Area code: 0324

Şeyhömer is a neighbourhood in the municipality and district of Gülnar, Mersin Province, Turkey. Its population is 486 (2022). It is situated to the south of the road connecting Gülnar to west. Its distance to Gülnar is 13 kilometres (8.1 mi) and to Mersin is 163 kilometres (101 mi).

== History ==
The Turkmen village was founded in the fourteenth century by a religious leader named Şeyh Ömer from Bukhara (a city in modern Uzbekistan). Şeyh Ömer's tomb is in the village. There are also Roman age rock tombs around the village.

== Economy ==
The village is also a yayla of Aydıncık residents who seek cooler places to spend the summers. The major economic activity is agriculture. Cereals as well as squash, bean and garbanzo are among the crops. Fruits are also produced.

== Trivia ==
According to mythology Şeyh Ömer helped Karamanoğlu sultan in capturing Mamure Castle.
