= Gülövşə =

- Municipality
- Location within Azerbaijan
- Coordinates: 40°44′39″N 47°10′52″E
- Country: Azerbaijan
- Rayon: Yevlakh

Population
  - Total: 2,237
- Time zone: UTC+4 (AZT)
  - Summer (DST): UTC+5 (AZT)

Gülövşə (also, Külövşə and Gyulevsha) is a village and municipality in the Yevlakh Rayon of Azerbaijan. It has a population of 2,237. The municipality consists of the villages of Gülövşə and Bəydili.
