= Dereköy, Bozyazı =

Dereköy
- Neighbourhood
- Location in Turkey
- Coordinates: 36°20′N 33°04′E
- Country: Turkey
- Province: Mersin
- District: Bozyazı
- Elevation: 1,130 m (3,710 ft)
- Population (2022): 231
- Time zone: UTC+3 (TRT)
- Area code: 0324

Dereköy (literally "creekville") is a neighbourhood in the municipality and district of Bozyazı, Mersin Province, Turkey. Its population is 231 (2022). It is a mountain village in the Taurus Mountains. The distance to Bozyazı is about 70 kilometres (43 mi). The population of the village is composed of Turkmens. Dereköy was once a part of İshaklar village situated to the south; but it was eventually issued from İshaklar. The main economic activities in the village are animal breeding and agriculture. But some residents also work in services either in Anamur or Bozyazı and only spend the summers in Dereköy.
