= Ahacık, Bayat =

Village in Turkey

Ahacık
- Village
- Location in Turkey
- Coordinates: 40°48′N 34°08′E
- Country: Turkey
- Province: Çorum
- District: Bayat
- Population (2022): 995
- Time zone: UTC+3 (TRT)

Ahacık is a village in the Bayat District of Çorum Province in Turkey. Its population is 995 (2022).
