= Delikkaya, Gülnar =

Delikkaya
- Neighbourhood
- Location in Turkey
- Coordinates: 36°17′N 33°29′E
- Country: Turkey
- Province: Mersin
- District: Gülnar
- Elevation: 585 m (1,919 ft)
- Population (2022): 191
- Time zone: UTC+3 (TRT)
- Postal code: 33702
- Area code: 0324

Delikkaya is a neighbourhood in the municipality and district of Gülnar, Mersin Province, Turkey. Its population is 191 (2022). The village is situated in the Taurus Mountains. The distance to Gülnar is 15 kilometres (9.3 mi).
