= Tepe, Gülnar =

Tepe Lapa
- Neighbourhood
- Location in Turkey
- Coordinates: 36°13′N 33°33′E
- Country: Turkey
- Province: Mersin
- District: Gülnar
- Elevation: 550 m (1,800 ft)
- Population (2022): 109
- Time zone: UTC+3 (TRT)
- Postal code: 33702
- Area code: 0324

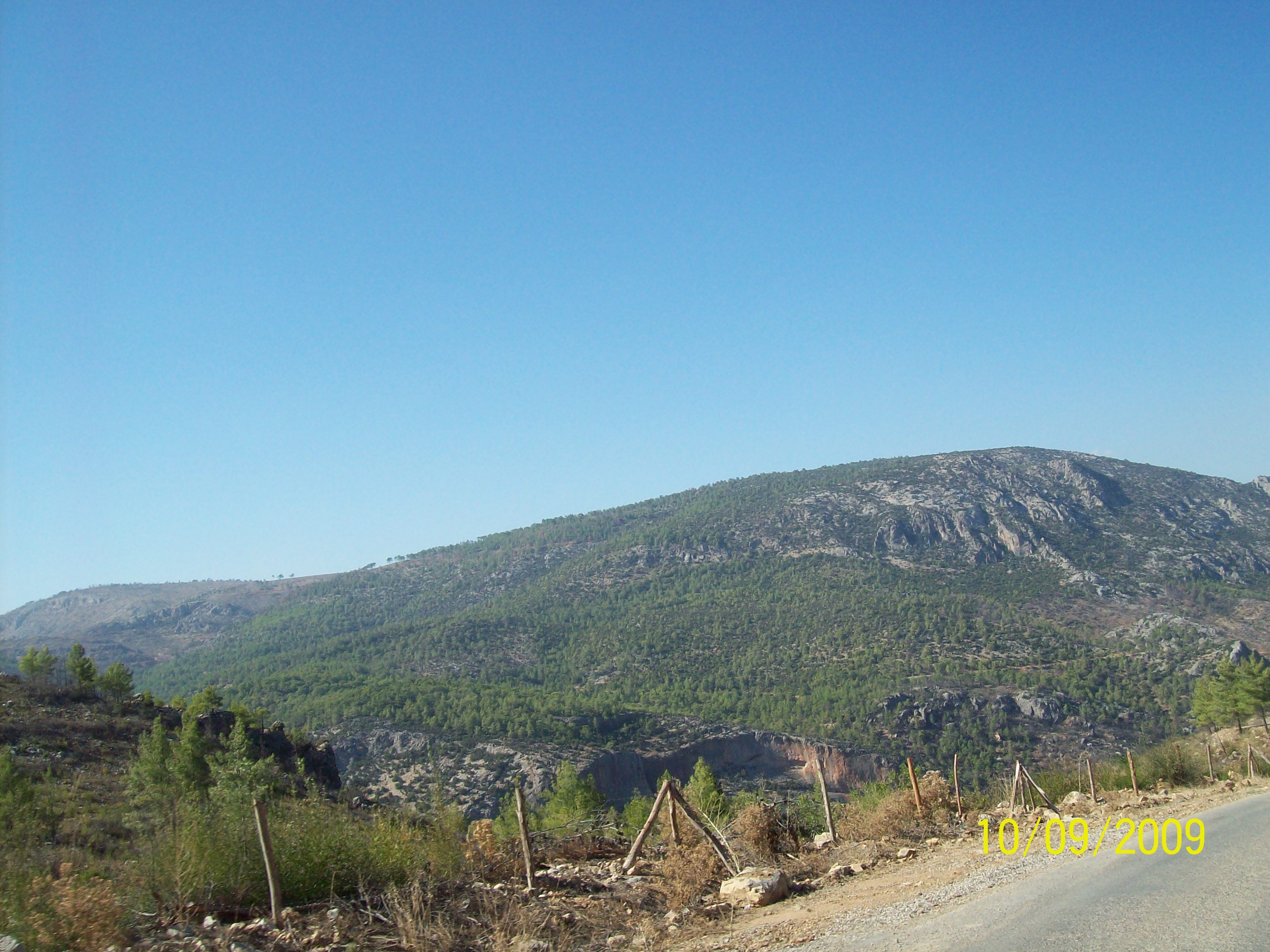

Tepe is a neighbourhood in the municipality and district of Gülnar, Mersin Province, Turkey. Its population is 109 (2022). It is situated in the Toros Mountains. The name of the village tepe means "hill" and it refers to a hill to the south of the village. Distance to Gülnar is 42 kilometres (26 mi) and to Mersin is 145 kilometres (90 mi).
