= Taşoluk, Gülnar =

Taşoluk
- Neighbourhood
- Location in Turkey
- Coordinates: 36°21′N 33°08′E
- Country: Turkey
- Province: Mersin
- District: Gülnar
- Elevation: 1,260 m (4,130 ft)
- Population (2022): 157
- Time zone: UTC+3 (TRT)
- Postal code: 33702
- Area code: 0324

Taşoluk is a neighbourhood in the municipality and district of Gülnar, Mersin Province, Turkey. Its population is 157 (2022). It is in the mountainous area to the west of Gülnar. The distance to Gülnar is 24 kilometres (15 mi) and to Mersin is 184 kilometres (114 mi).
