= Yenişıhlar, Bayat =

Village in Turkey

Yenişıhlar
- Village
- Location in Turkey
- Coordinates: 40°44′N 34°08′E
- Country: Turkey
- Province: Çorum
- District: Bayat
- Population (2022): 107
- Time zone: UTC+3 (TRT)

Yenişıhlar (also: Yenişeyhler) is a village in the Bayat District of Çorum Province in Turkey. Its population is 107 (2022).
