= Ardıçlıtaş =

- Neighbourhood
- Location in Turkey
- Coordinates: 36°20′N 33°01′E
- Country: Turkey
- Province: Mersin
- District: Bozyazı
- Elevation: 1,260 m (4,130 ft)
- Population (2022): 136
- Time zone: UTC+3 (TRT)
- Area code: 0324

Ardıçlıtaş is a neighbourhood in the municipality and district of Bozyazı, Mersin Province, Turkey. Its population is 136 (2022). It is situated in the Taurus Mountains to the north of Bozyazı. The distance to Bozyazı is 35 kilometres (22 mi) and the distance to Mersin is 230 kilometres (140 mi).
