= Yanışlı =

- Neighbourhood
- Location in Turkey
- Coordinates: 36°10′N 33°30′E
- Country: Turkey
- Province: Mersin
- District: Gülnar
- Elevation: 75 m (246 ft)
- Population (2022): 1,501
- Time zone: UTC+3 (TRT)
- Postal code: 33702
- Area code: 0324

Yanışlı is a neighbourhood in the municipality and district of Gülnar, Mersin Province, Turkey. Its population is 1,501 (2022). It is situated on Turkish state highway D.400. Distance to Gülnar is 47 kilometres (29 mi) and to Mersin is 142 kilometres (88 mi).
