= Köpüklü, Bayat =

Village in Turkey

Köpüklü
- Village
- Location in Turkey
- Coordinates: 40°34′N 34°13′E
- Country: Turkey
- Province: Çorum
- District: Bayat
- Population (2022): 141
- Time zone: UTC+3 (TRT)

Köpüklü is a village in the Bayat District of Çorum Province in Turkey. Its population is 141 (2022).
