= Bayat District, Çorum =

District of Çorum Province, Turkey

Bayat District
- District
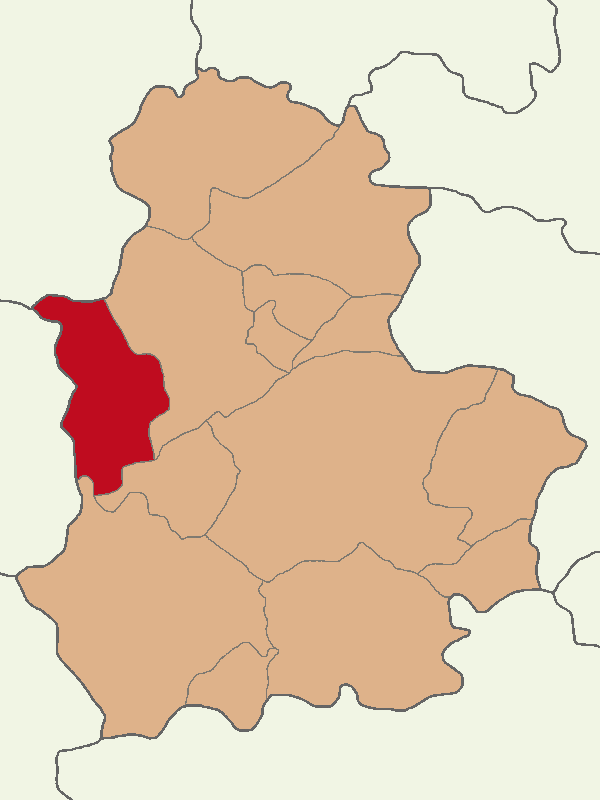
- Map showing Bayat District in Çorum Province

- Location in Turkey
- Coordinates: 40°39′N 34°16′E
- Country: Turkey
- Province: Çorum
- Seat: Bayat

Government
  - Kaymakam: Yunus Emre Bozkurtoğlu
- Area: 717 km^{2} (277 sq mi)
- Population (2022): 14,615
  - Density: 20/km^{2} (53/sq mi)
- Time zone: UTC+3 (TRT)
- Website: www.corumbayat.gov.tr

Bayat District is a district of the Çorum Province of Turkey. Its seat is the town of Bayat. Its area is 717 km^{2}, and its population is 14,615 (2022).

== Composition ==
There is one municipality in Bayat District:

- Bayat

There are 40 villages in Bayat District:

- Ahacık
- Akseki
- Aşağı Emirhalil
- Ayvalıca
- Barak
- Bayan
- Beydili
- Çamlıgüney
- Çayköy
- Çerkeş
- Cevizli
- Çukuröz
- Demirciler
- Derekutuğun
- Dorukseki
- Emirhalil
- Emirşah
- Eskialibey
- Evci
- Falı
- Hacıbayram
- İleği
- İshaklı
- Kalınpelit
- Karakaya
- Köpüklü
- Kubbedin
- Kunduzlu
- Kuruçay
- Lapa
- Pancarlık
- Sağpazar
- Sarayköy
- Tepekutuğun
- Tevekli
- Toyhane
- Yeniköy
- Yenişıhlar
- Yeşilçat
- Yoncalı
