= Tozkovan, Gülnar =

Tozkovan
- Neighbourhood
- Location in Turkey
- Coordinates: 36°23′N 33°22′E
- Country: Turkey
- Province: Mersin
- District: Gülnar
- Elevation: 970 m (3,180 ft)
- Population (2022): 112
- Time zone: UTC+3 (TRT)
- Postal code: 33702
- Area code: 0324

Tozkovan is neighbourhood in the municipality and district of Gülnar, Mersin Province, Turkey. Its population is 112 (2022). It is situated in Toros Mountains. Distance to Gülnar is 8 kilometres (5.0 mi) and to Mersin is 158 kilometres (98 mi).
