= Karakaya, Bayat =

Village in Turkey

Karakaya
- Village
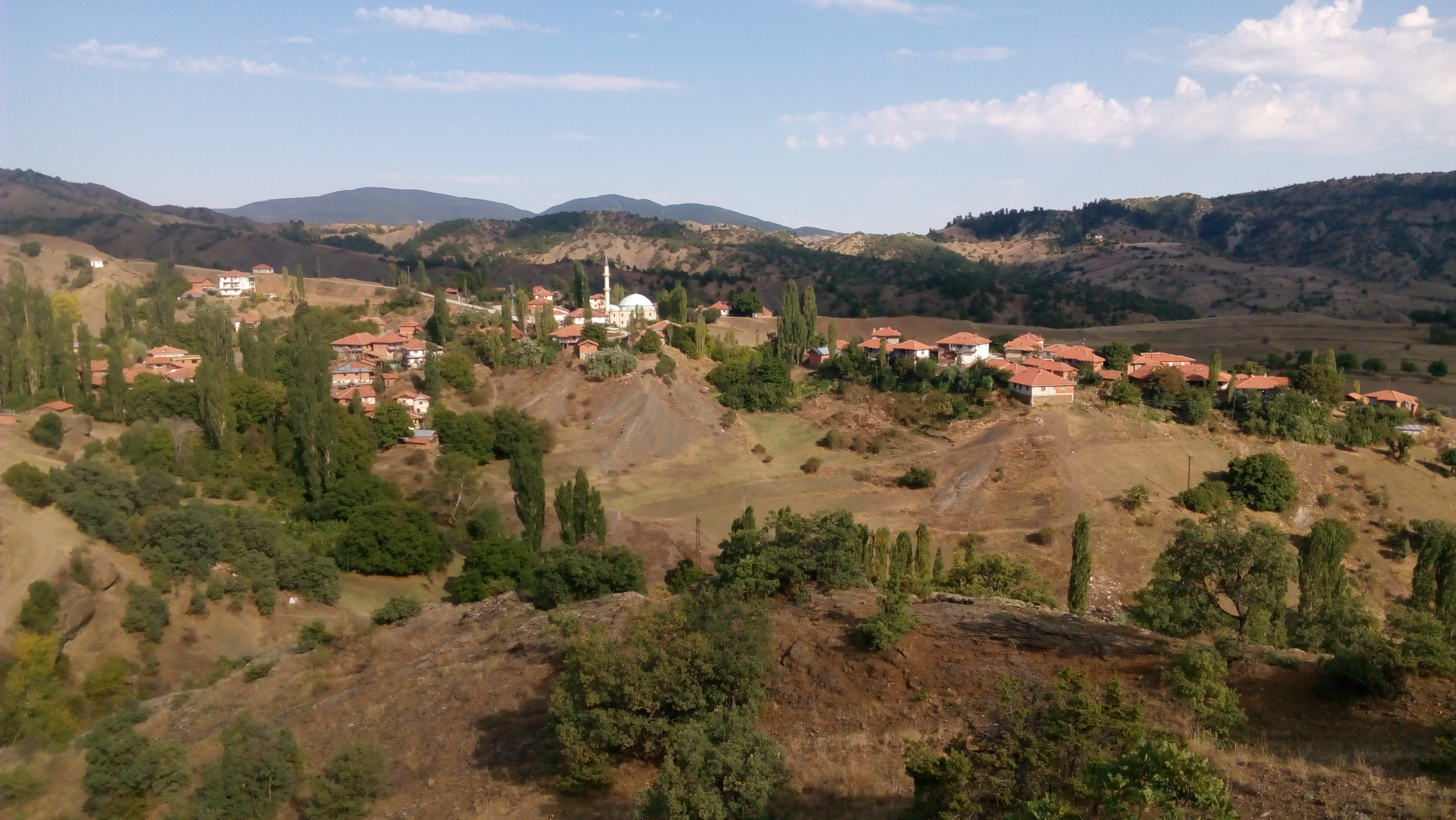

- Location within Turkey
- Country: Turkey
- Province: Çorum
- District: Bayat
- Population (2022): 66
- Time zone: UTC+3 (TRT)

Karakaya is a village in the Bayat District of Çorum Province in Turkey. Its population is 66 (2022).
