= Koçaşlı =

- Neighbourhood
- Location in Turkey
- Coordinates: 36°11′N 33°30′E
- Country: Turkey
- Province: Mersin
- District: Gülnar
- Elevation: 70 m (230 ft)
- Population (2022): 74
- Time zone: UTC+3 (TRT)
- Postal code: 33702
- Area code: 0324

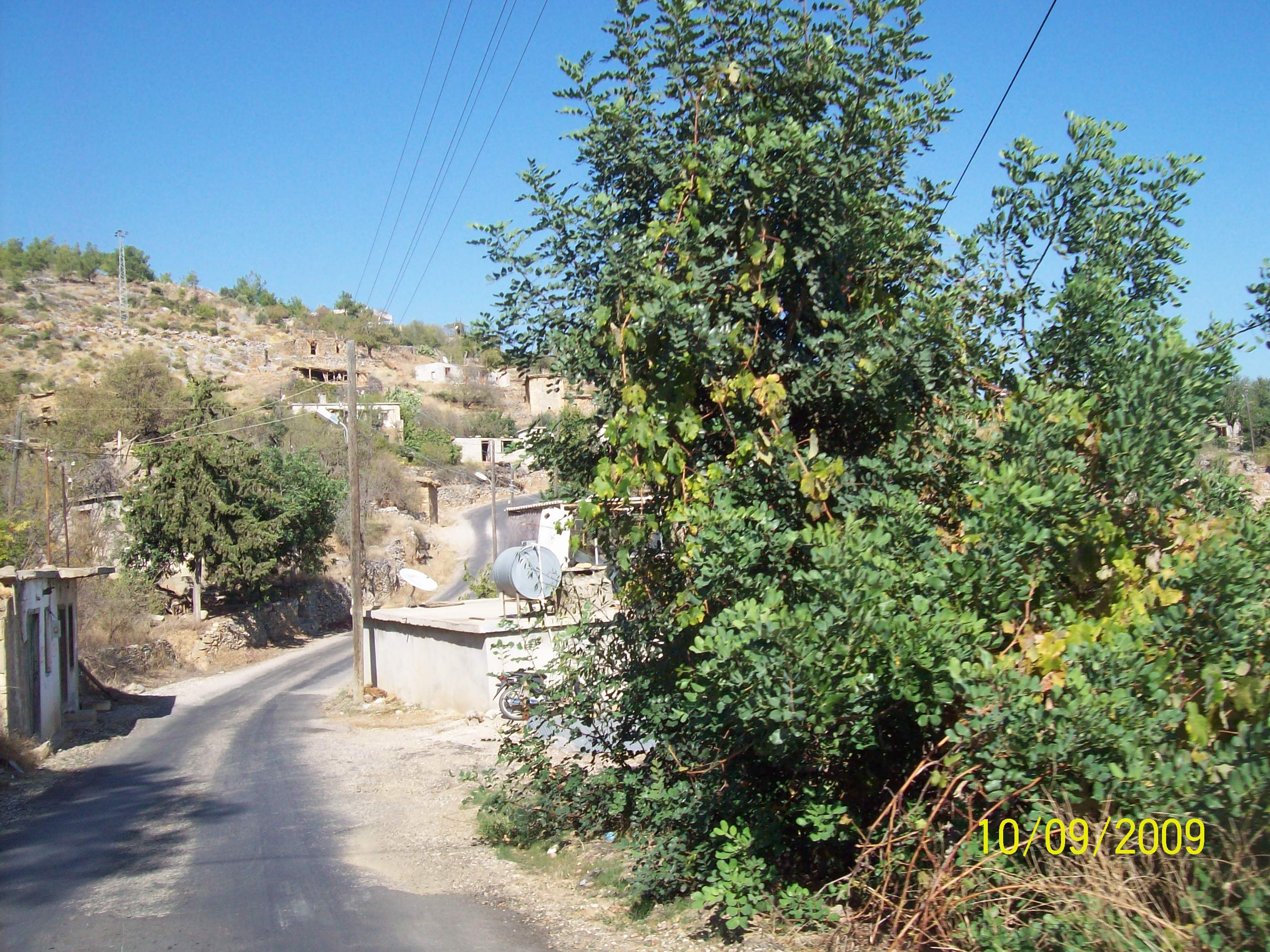
Koçaşlı, Gülnar, Mersin, Turkey

Koçaşlı is a neighbourhood in the municipality and district of Gülnar, Mersin Province, Turkey. Its population is 74 (2022). It is situated to the north of Turkish state highway D.400. Distance to Gülnar is 51 kilometres (32 mi) and to Mersin is 140 kilometres (87 mi).
