= Elmakuzu =

- Neighbourhood
- Location in Turkey
- Coordinates: 36°24′N 33°02′E
- Country: Turkey
- Province: Mersin
- District: Bozyazı
- Elevation: 1,415 m (4,642 ft)
- Population (2022): 287
- Time zone: UTC+3 (TRT)
- Area code: 0324

Elmakuzu is a neighbourhood in the municipality and district of Bozyazı, Mersin Province, Turkey. Its population is 287 (2022). It is situated in the Taurus Mountains to the north of Bozyazı. The village is far from the main roads. The distance to Bozyazı is 42 kilometres (26 mi) and the distance to Mersin is 241 kilometres (150 mi).
