= Çavuşlar =

- Neighbourhood
- Location in Turkey
- Coordinates: 36°17′N 33°33′E
- Country: Turkey
- Province: Mersin
- District: Gülnar
- Elevation: 480 m (1,570 ft)
- Population (2022): 278
- Time zone: UTC+3 (TRT)
- Postal code: 33702
- Area code: 0324

Çavuşlar is a neighbourhood in the municipality and district of Gülnar, Mersin Province, Turkey. Its population is 278 (2022). According to a local historian, the village was named after a certain Turkmen tribe leader named Ömer Çavuş lived during the late 17th century . It is 50 kilometres (31 mi) to Gülnar and 140 kilometres (87 mi) to Mersin.
