= Yassıbağ, Gülnar =

Yassıbağ
- Neighbourhood
- Location in Turkey
- Coordinates: 36°18′N 33°21′E
- Country: Turkey
- Province: Mersin
- District: Gülnar
- Elevation: 875 m (2,871 ft)
- Population (2022): 71
- Time zone: UTC+3 (TRT)
- Postal code: 33702
- Area code: 0324

Yassıbağ is a neighbourhood in the municipality and district of Gülnar, Mersin Province, Turkey. Its population is 71 (2022). It is situated to the southwest of Gülnar. The distance to Gülnar is 5 kilometres (3.1 mi) and to Mersin is 155 kilometres (96 mi).
