= Kalınpelit, Bayat =

Village in Turkey

Kalınpelit
- Village
- Location in Turkey
- Coordinates: 40°45′N 34°05′E
- Country: Turkey
- Province: Çorum
- District: Bayat
- Population (2022): 189
- Time zone: UTC+3 (TRT)

Kalınpelit is a village in the Bayat District of Çorum Province in Turkey. Its population is 189 (2022).
