= Kurbağa =

- Neighbourhood
- Location in Turkey
- Coordinates: 36°27′N 33°22′E
- Country: Turkey
- Province: Mersin
- District: Gülnar
- Elevation: 800 m (2,600 ft)
- Population (2022): 223
- Time zone: UTC+3 (TRT)
- Postal code: 33702
- Area code: 0324

Kurbağa is a neighbourhood in the municipality and district of Gülnar, Mersin Province, Turkey. Its population is 223 (2022). It is situated in Toros Mountains and to the east of a tributary of Göksu River. Distance to Gülnar is 13 kilometres (8.1 mi) and to Mersin is 163 kilometres (101 mi).
