= Kanun-i Esasi (magazine) =

Ottoman Turkish language weekly magazine in Egypt (1896–1899)

- Categories: Political magazine
- Frequency: Weekly
- Publisher: Kanun-i Esasi Publishing House
- Founder: Young Turks
- Founded: 24 December 1896
- Final issue: 1899
- Based in: Cairo
- Language: Ottoman Turkish

Kanun-i Esasi (Ottoman Turkish: Constitution) was one of the publications which were affiliated with the Young Turks, members of the Committee of Union and Progress. It was published by the exiled committee members in Cairo in the period 1896–1899.

== History and profile ==
Kanun-i Esasi was launched by a group known as the Young Turks in Cairo on 21 December 1896. The group was led by Hoca Kadri Efendi and Sheikh Alizade Muhyiddin who were members of the Cairo branch of the Committee of Union and Progress. They supported the Geneva faction of the committee.

The magazine was published weekly by a publishing house with the same name on Mondays. The goal of Kanun-i Esasi was announced as informing the people and liberating the “sacred homeland” on the grounds of Sharia and patriotism. It covered articles concerning the policies of the Ottoman Sultan Abdulhamit, the Islamic caliphate and Muslim world. The magazine adopted a pan-Islamic political stance. It advocated the rejection of the discrimination of Muslims due to their sects. The weekly existed until 1899.
