= Akcami, Bozyazı =

Akcami
- Neighbourhood
- Location in Turkey
- Coordinates: 36°09′N 32°56′E
- Country: Turkey
- Province: Mersin
- District: Bozyazı
- Elevation: 210 m (690 ft)
- Population (2022): 63
- Time zone: UTC+3 (TRT)
- Area code: 0324

Akcami is a neighbourhood in the municipality and district of Bozyazı, Mersin Province, Turkey. Its population is 63 (2022). It is situated to the northwest of Bozyazı. The distance to Bozyazı is 7 kilometres (4.3 mi), and the distance to Mersin is 206 kilometres (128 mi).
