= Ardıçpınarı =

Ardıçpınarı Elibaş
- Neighbourhood
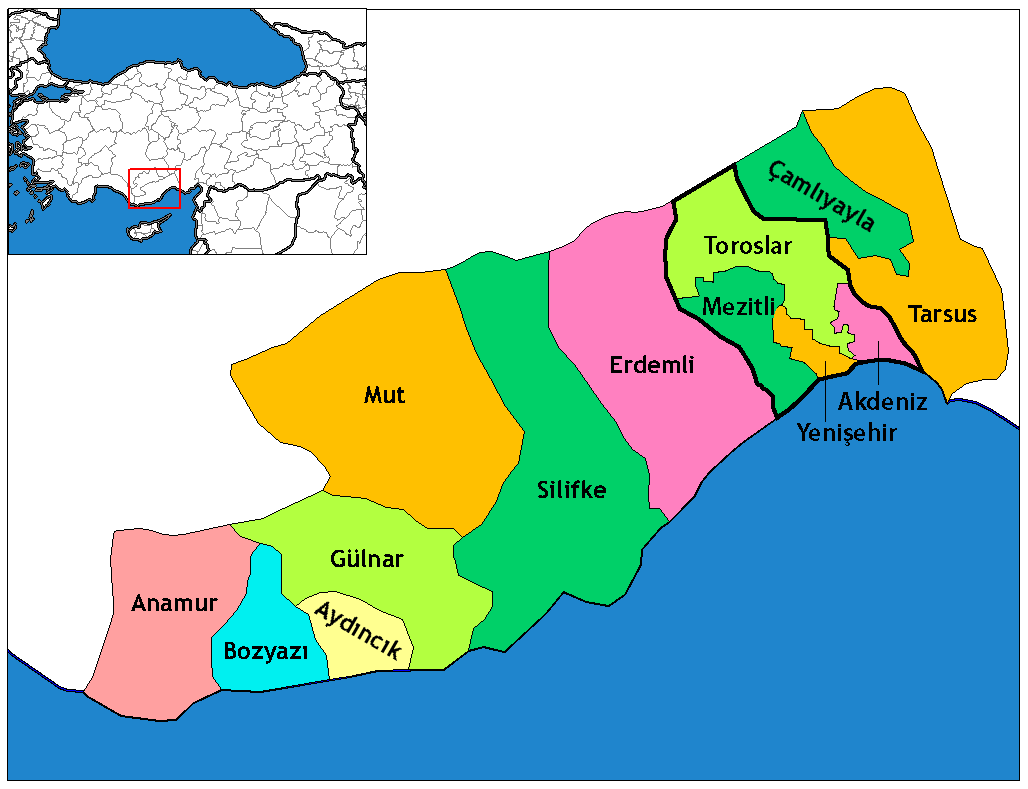
- Map of districts in Mersin province, Turkey.

- Location within Turkey
- Coordinates: 36°19′N 33°15′E
- Country: Turkey
- Province: Mersin
- District: Gülnar
- Elevation: 1,075 m (3,527 ft)
- Population (2022): 188
- Time zone: UTC+3 (TRT)
- Postal code: 33702
- Area code: 0324

Ardıçpınarı (formerly: Elibaş) is a neighbourhood in the municipality and district of Gülnar, Mersin Province, Turkey. Its population is 188 (2022). It is situated to the west of Gülnar. Distance to Gülnar is 13 kilometres (8.1 mi) and to Mersin is 164 kilometres (102 mi).
