= Derekutuğun, Bayat =

Village in Turkey

Derekutuğun
- Village
- Location in Turkey
- Coordinates: 40°38′N 34°11′E
- Country: Turkey
- Province: Çorum
- District: Bayat
- Population (2022): 278
- Time zone: UTC+3 (TRT)

Derekutuğun is a village in the Bayat District of Çorum Province in Turkey. Its population is 278 (2022).
