= Demirciler, Bayat =

Village in Turkey

Demirciler
- Village
- Country: Turkey
- Province: Çorum
- District: Bayat
- Population (2022): 155
- Time zone: UTC+3 (TRT)

Demirciler is a village in the Bayat District of Çorum Province in Turkey. Its population is 155 (2022).
