= Derebaşı, Bozyazı =

Derebaşı
- Neighbourhood
- Location in Turkey
- Coordinates: 36°09′N 33°02′E
- Country: Turkey
- Province: Mersin
- District: Bozyazı
- Elevation: 420 m (1,380 ft)
- Population (2022): 86
- Time zone: UTC+3 (TRT)
- Area code: 0324

Derebaşı is a neighbourhood in the municipality and district of Bozyazı, Mersin Province, Turkey. Its population is 86 (2022). It is situated to the northeast of Bozyazı. The distance to Bozyazı is 8 kilometres (5.0 mi) and to Mersin is 207 kilometres (129 mi).
