= Örenpınar, Gülnar =

Örenpınar
- Neighbourhood
- Location in Turkey
- Coordinates: 36°27′N 33°21′E
- Country: Turkey
- Province: Mersin
- District: Gülnar
- Elevation: 705 m (2,313 ft)
- Population (2022): 267
- Time zone: UTC+3 (TRT)
- Postal code: 33702
- Area code: 0324

Örenpınar (former Punura) is a neighbourhood in the municipality and district of Gülnar, Mersin Province, Turkey. Its population is 267 (2022). It is situated in Toros Mountains. Distance to Gülnar is 19 kilometres (12 mi) and to Mersin is 169 kilometres (105 mi).
