= Kömürlü, Bozyazı =

Kömürlü
- Neighbourhood
- Location in Turkey
- Coordinates: 36°10′N 32°56′E
- Country: Turkey
- Province: Mersin
- District: Bozyazı
- Elevation: 575 m (1,886 ft)
- Population (2022): 297
- Time zone: UTC+3 (TRT)
- Area code: 0324

Kömürlü is a neighbourhood in the municipality and district of Bozyazı, Mersin Province, Turkey. Its population is 297 (2022). It is situated to the north of Bozyazı. The distance to Bozyazı is 7 kilometres (4.3 mi) and the distance to Mersin is 206 kilometres (128 mi).
