= Karaisalı, Bozyazı =

Karaisalı
- Neighbourhood
- Location in Turkey
- Coordinates: 36°08′N 33°00′E
- Country: Turkey
- Province: Mersin
- District: Bozyazı
- Elevation: 34 m (112 ft)
- Population (2022): 1,153
- Time zone: UTC+3 (TRT)

Karaisalı is a neighbourhood in the municipality and district of Bozyazı, Mersin Province, Turkey. Its population is 1,153 (2022). It is at the north east of Bozyazı and has almost merged with Bozyazı.
