= Göktürk, Gülnar =

Göktürk
- Neighbourhood
- Location in Turkey
- Coordinates: 36°20′N 33°13′E
- Country: Turkey
- Province: Mersin
- District: Gülnar
- Elevation: 1,155 m (3,789 ft)
- Population (2022): 75
- Time zone: UTC+3 (TRT)
- Postal code: 33702
- Area code: 0324

Göktürk is a neighbourhood in the municipality and district of Gülnar, Mersin Province, Turkey. Its population is 75 (2022). The village is situated in the Toros Mountains. The distance to Gülnar is 22 kilometres (14 mi) and to Mersin is 172 kilometres (107 mi).
