= Demirözü, Gülnar =

Demirözü Hortu
- Neighbourhood
- Location in Turkey
- Coordinates: 36°24′N 33°15′E
- Country: Turkey
- Province: Mersin
- District: Gülnar
- Elevation: 1,100 m (3,600 ft)
- Population (2022): 277
- Time zone: UTC+3 (TRT)
- Postal code: 33702
- Area code: 0324

Demirözü (former Hortu) is a neighbourhood in the municipality and district of Gülnar, Mersin Province, Turkey. Its population is 277 (2022). The village is situated in Toros Mountains. The distance to Gülnar is 23 kilometres (14 mi) and to Mersin is 170 kilometres (110 mi). There are two ponds with reed beds to the northeast of the village.
