= Kayrak =

- Neighbourhood
- Location in Turkey
- Coordinates: 36°21′N 33°32′E
- Country: Turkey
- Province: Mersin
- District: Gülnar
- Elevation: 1,205 m (3,953 ft)
- Population (2022): 594
- Time zone: UTC+3 (TRT)
- Postal code: 33702
- Area code: 0324

Kayrak is a neighbourhood in the municipality and district of Gülnar, Mersin Province, Turkey. Its population is 594 (2022). It is situated on the road connecting Gülnar to Mersin. The distance to Gülnar is 15 kilometres (9.3 mi) and to Mersin is 135 kilometres (84 mi). The present population of the village is composed of Turks who settled in the village in 1800s. But nearby ruins of a castle imply that it was settled by other peoples in the Middle Ages.
