= Çukurasma, Gülnar =

Çukurasma
- Neighbourhood
- Location in Turkey
- Coordinates: 36°22′N 33°25′E
- Country: Turkey
- Province: Mersin
- District: Gülnar
- Elevation: 1,025 m (3,363 ft)
- Population (2022): 649
- Time zone: UTC+3 (TRT)
- Postal code: 33702
- Area code: 0324

Çukurasma is a neighbourhood in the municipality and district of Gülnar, Mersin Province, Turkey. Its population is 649 (2022). The village is situated in the Taurus Mountains. Its distance to Gülnar is 4 kilometres (2.5 mi) and to Mersin is 151 kilometres (94 mi).
