= Yenice, Gülnar =

Yenice
- Neighbourhood
- Location in Turkey
- Coordinates: 36°19′N 33°24′E
- Country: Turkey
- Province: Mersin
- District: Gülnar
- Elevation: 775 m (2,543 ft)
- Population (2022): 99
- Time zone: UTC+3 (TRT)
- Postal code: 33702
- Area code: 0324

Yenice is a neighbourhood in the municipality and district of Gülnar, Mersin Province, Turkey. Its population is 99 (2022). It is situated to the southwest of Gülnar. The distance to Gülnar is 4 kilometres (2.5 mi) and to Mersin is 154 kilometres (96 mi).
