= Kuskan =

- Neighbourhood
- Location in Turkey
- Coordinates: 36°29′N 33°16′E
- Country: Turkey
- Province: Mersin
- District: Gülnar
- Elevation: 875 m (2,871 ft)
- Population (2022): 1,846
- Time zone: UTC+3 (TRT)
- Postal code: 33702
- Area code: 0324

Kuskan is a neighbourhood in the municipality and district of Gülnar, Mersin Province, Turkey. Its population is 1,846 (2022). Before the 2013 reorganisation, it was a town (belde).

== Geography ==
Kuskan is a mountain town with an altitude of 875 metres (2,871 ft) and it is quite far from the main highways. The distance to selected localities are, 42 kilometres (26 mi) to Gülnar, 32 kilometres (20 mi) to Mut (another district center of Mersin Province) and 170 kilometres (110 mi) to Mersin.

== Economy ==
Kuskan is a typical agricultural town. Traditional crops are cereals. But lately some farmers try other crops such as grape, apple, pistachio and olive. There are a few carpet weaving looms in the town. But weaving is on the decline.
