= Dayıcık, Gülnar =

Dayıcık
- Neighbourhood
- Location in Turkey
- Coordinates: 36°26′N 33°18′E
- Country: Turkey
- Province: Mersin
- District: Gülnar
- Elevation: 1,100 m (3,600 ft)
- Population (2022): 465
- Time zone: UTC+3 (TRT)
- Postal code: 33702
- Area code: 0324

Dayıcık is a neighbourhood in the municipality and district of Gülnar, Mersin Province, Turkey. Its population is 465 (2022). The village is situated in the Taurus Mountains. The distance to Gülnar is 33 kilometres (21 mi) and to Mersin is 180 kilometres (110 mi).
