= Emirhalil, Bayat =

Village in Turkey

Emirhalil
- Village
- Location in Turkey
- Coordinates: 40.5547°N 34.2877°E
- Country: Turkey
- Province: Çorum
- District: Bayat
- Population (2022): 128
- Time zone: UTC+3 (TRT)

Emirhalil is a village in the Bayat District of Çorum Province in Turkey. Its population is 128 (2022). The village is populated by Kurds.
