= Zeyne, Gülnar =

Neighbourhood of Gülnar in Mersin, Turkey

Zeyne Sütlüce
- Neighbourhood
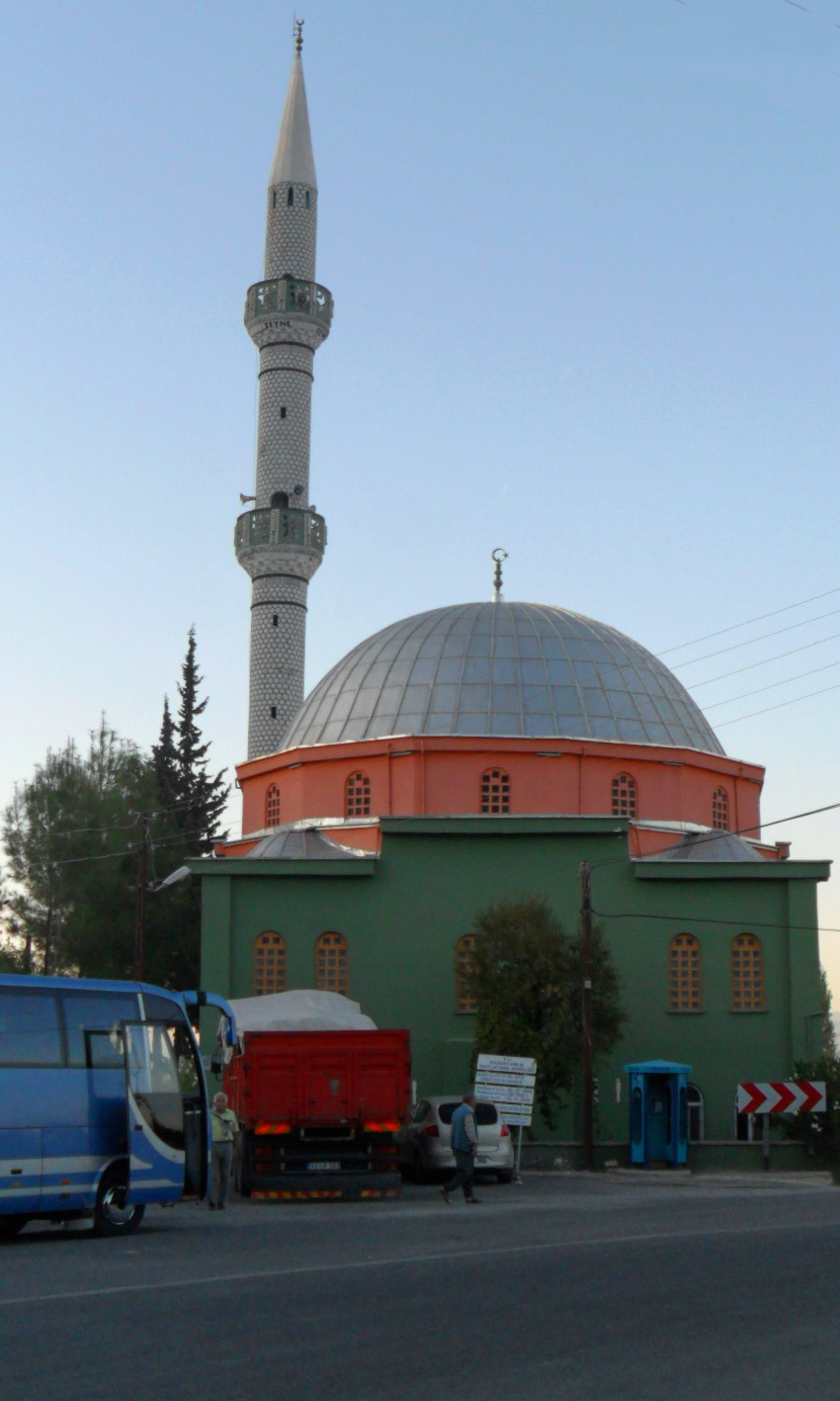
- Zeyne mosque

- Location within Turkey
- Coordinates: 36°26′N 33°32′E
- Country: Turkey
- Province: Mersin
- District: Gülnar
- Established: 1721
- Elevation: 360 m (1,180 ft)
- Population (2022): 1,388
- Time zone: UTC+3 (TRT)
- Postal code: 33702
- Area code: 0324

Zeyne is a neighbourhood in the municipality and district of Gülnar, Mersin Province, Turkey. Its population is 1,388 (2022). Before the 2013 reorganisation, it was a town (belde).

== Geography ==
Zeyne is 9 kilometres (5.6 mi) west of Göksu River with an altitude of 360 metres (1,180 ft) above sea level. Distance to Gülnar is 26 kilometres (16 mi) and to Mersin is 151 kilometres (94 mi).

== History ==
History of Zeyne is intermingled with that of Gülnar. During the Middle Ages it was a part of the Karamanid beylik (principality). After the Karamanids were defeated by the Ottoman Empire it was incorporated into the Ottoman realm in the 15th century. In 1972 the location was renamed as Sütlüce and declared to be a township. The new name was not widely accepted and the government decided to return to the former name in 2007

Sheik Ali Semerkandi (Ali of Samarkand) is an important figure of Zeyne history. He was a Muslim religious leader in Samarkand (modern Uzbekistan) According to legend, he travelled to Anatolia and settled in Zeyne in 1434. He stayed in Zeyne and Karaman for the rest of his life and died in Zeyne in 1457. A mosque had been built next to his tomb in Zeyne. There is a spring just east of the town where very old monumental trees (Turkish: Anıt ağaçlar) have been grown. According to mythology that spring was created by Ali Semarkandi.

== Economy ==
The town is a typical agricultural town. Olives and various fruits like apricots, figs and grapes are produced. Dairying is also an important economic activity.
