= Köseçobanlı =

- Neighbourhood
- Location in Turkey
- Coordinates: 36°25′N 33°08′E
- Country: Turkey
- Province: Mersin
- District: Gülnar
- Elevation: 1,300 m (4,300 ft)
- Population (2022): 2,186
- Time zone: UTC+3 (TRT)
- Postal code: 33702
- Area code: 0324

Köseçobanlı is a neighbourhood in the municipality and district of Gülnar, Mersin Province, Turkey. Its population is 2,186 (2022). Before the 2013 reorganisation, it was a town (belde).

== Geography ==
The town is in rural area of Gülnar district which in turn is a part of Mersin Province. The highway distance to Gülnar is 33 km (21 mi) and to Mersin is 182 km (113 mi). Köseçobanlı is on a high plateau of Toros Mountains, the average altitude being around 1,300 m (4,300 ft)

== People ==
Like surrounding villages and towns, origin of Köseçobanlı residents are mostly Yörüks (nomadic Oghuz Turks) who had migrated from Turkestan during Mongol invasions.

== Economy ==
The main economic activity is agriculture. The main crops are cereals, apple and chickpea. The traditional livestock was goat. But cattle has replaced goats in order to protect forest around. Another business is beekeeping.
