= Ayvalıca, Bayat =

Village in Turkey

Ayvalıca
- Village
- Location in Turkey
- Coordinates: 40.6666°N 34.1478°E
- Country: Turkey
- Province: Çorum
- District: Bayat
- Population (2022): 108
- Time zone: UTC+3 (TRT)

Ayvalıca is a village in the Bayat District of Çorum Province in Turkey. Its population is 108 (2022). The village is populated by Kurds.
