= Dorukseki, Bayat =

Village in Turkey

Dorukseki
- Village
- Location in Turkey
- Coordinates: 40°40′N 34°20′E
- Country: Turkey
- Province: Çorum
- District: Bayat
- Population (2022): 271
- Time zone: UTC+3 (TRT)

Dorukseki is a village in the Bayat District of Çorum Province in Turkey. Its population is 271 (2022).
