= Çamlıgüney, Bayat =

Village in Turkey

Çamlıgüney
- Village
- Location in Turkey
- Coordinates: 40°36′N 34°08′E
- Country: Turkey
- Province: Çorum
- District: Bayat
- Population (2022): 70
- Time zone: UTC+3 (TRT)

Çamlıgüney is a village in the Bayat District of Çorum Province in Turkey. Its population is 70 (2022). The village is populated by Kurds.
