= Aşağı Emirhalil, Bayat =

Village in Turkey

Aşağı Emirhalil
- Village
- Location in Turkey
- Coordinates: 40.5313°N 34.3237°E
- Country: Turkey
- Province: Çorum
- District: Bayat
- Population (2022): 69
- Time zone: UTC+3 (TRT)

Aşağı Emirhalil is a village in the Bayat District of Çorum Province in Turkey. Its population is 69 (2022). The village is populated by Kurds.
