= Kubbedin, Bayat =

Village in Turkey

Kubbedin
- Village
- Location in Turkey
- Coordinates: 40°42′N 34°10′E
- Country: Turkey
- Province: Çorum
- District: Bayat
- Population (2022): 25
- Time zone: UTC+3 (TRT)

Kubbedin is a village in the Bayat District of Çorum Province in Turkey. Its population is 25 (2022).
