= Cemiyet-i Müderrisin =

Turkish Islamist organization

Cemiyet-i Müderrisîn was an Islamist organization in Turkey led by İskilipli Mehmed Atıf Hoca which aimed to increase religiosity in Turkish society.

== History ==
The group was founded on February 15, 1919. Although the group did not permit their members to actively participate in politics, it did permit party membership. On September 1919, the group published a statement on İkdam Newspaper, heavily criticizing and insulting the Kuvâ-yi Milliye. Later, the group began to participate in politics and entered the general assembly in November 1919, and under the name Teâlî-i İslâm Cemiyeti.

The group allied with Freedom and Accord Party and was headquartered in Istanbul, with intensive operations in and around Konya. On February 19, 1919, it was named Teâlî-i İslâm Cemiyeti, and when Mustafa Sabri became sheikhulislam, Mehmed Atıf Hoca from İskilip was brought to the presidency. The Society first issued declarations against Bolshevism and the occupation forces, which protested the occupation of Izmir by the Greeks and emerged as a new danger. Branches were opened in various parts of Anatolia. The Konya branch of the Teâlî-i İslâm Cemiyeti wanted to participate in the elections of the Grand National Assembly of Turkey dated 1920. Mustafa Kemal Atatürk did not see any problem in this.
