= Barak, Bayat =

Village in Turkey

Barak
- Village
- Location in Turkey
- Coordinates: 40.5703°N 34.2154°E
- Country: Turkey
- Province: Çorum
- District: Bayat
- Population (2022): 94
- Time zone: UTC+3 (TRT)

Barak is a village in the Bayat District of Çorum Province in Turkey. Its population is 94 (2022).
