= Narince, Bozyazı =

Narince
- Neighbourhood
- Location in Turkey
- Coordinates: 36°08′48″N 32°56′08″E
- Country: Turkey
- Province: Mersin
- District: Bozyazı
- Elevation: 120 m (390 ft)
- Population (2022): 479
- Time zone: UTC+3 (TRT)
- Area code: 0324

Narince is a neighbourhood in the municipality and district of Bozyazı, Mersin Province, Turkey. Its population is 479 (2022). It is situated to the northwest of Bozyazı. The distance to Bozyazı is 6 kilometres (3.7 mi) and the distance to Mersin is 205 kilometres (127 mi).
