= Yarmasu =

- Neighbourhood
- Location in Turkey
- Coordinates: 36°22′N 33°05′E
- Country: Turkey
- Province: Mersin
- District: Gülnar
- Elevation: 1,300 m (4,300 ft)
- Population (2022): 530
- Time zone: UTC+3 (TRT)
- Postal code: 33702
- Area code: 0324

Yarmasu is a neighbourhood in the municipality and district of Gülnar, Mersin Province, Turkey. Its population is 530 (2022). It is situated to the southwest of Gülnar. The distance to Gülnar is 28 kilometres (17 mi) and to Mersin is 178 kilometres (111 mi).
