= İshaklar, Gülnar =

İshaklar
- Neighbourhood
- Location in Turkey
- Coordinates: 36°19′N 33°06′E
- Country: Turkey
- Province: Mersin
- District: Gülnar
- Elevation: 1,160 m (3,810 ft)
- Population (2022): 577
- Time zone: UTC+3 (TRT)
- Postal code: 33702
- Area code: 0324

İshaklar is a neighbourhood in the municipality and district of Gülnar, Mersin Province, Turkey. Its population is 577 (2022). It is situated in Toros Mountains. Distance to Gülnar is 28 kilometres (17 mi) and to Mersin is 175 kilometres (109 mi) (According to a personal page the original name of the village was İyisaklar ("good keeper") referring to an old event in which lost sheep of the village were found and kept by a shepherd.
