= Nagidos =

Ancient city of Cilicia

- Νάγιδος (Ancient Greek)
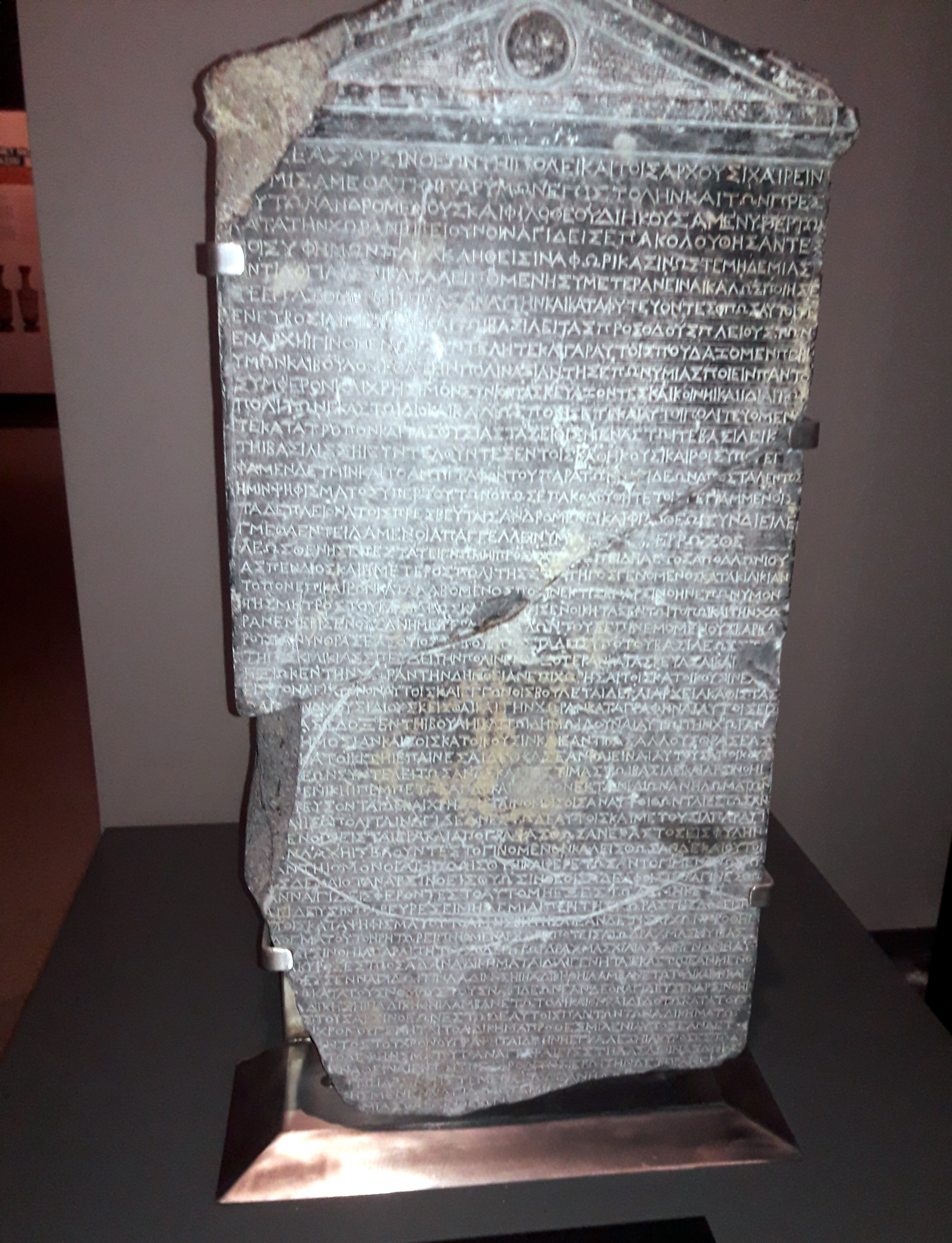
- Nagidos Inscription (In Mersin Archaeological Museum)

- Location within Turkey
- 36°05′59″N 32°58′41″E
- Type: Settlement
- Location: Bozyazı, Mersin Province, Turkey
- Region: Cilicia

History
- Built by: Colonists from Samos

Nagidos (Ancient Greek: Νάγιδος; Latin: Nagidus) was an ancient city of Cilicia. In ancient times it was located between Anemurion to the west and Arsinoe to the east. Today its ruins are found on the hill named Paşabeleni at the mouth of the Sini Cay (Bozyazı Dere) near Bozyazı in Mersin Province, Turkey. It lies at a distance of ca. 20 km to the east of Anamur. Like its eastern neighbor Kelenderis, it was a colony of Samos. The small island of Nagidoussa is opposite Nagidos; on it are the ruins of an Ottoman fortress.

== History ==
According to Pomponius Mela it was a Samian colony. Stephanus of Byzantium adds that the city named after its founder Nagidos (Νάγιδος), but this Nagidos was most probably the mythical founder and not the name of the actual founder. From the end of the fifth century BC, the town minted staters that had both Greek and Aramaic inscriptions, one of which bears the name of the Persian satrap Pharnabazus. The Nagidos mint used a grape cluster as a symbol on the reverse. The goddess Aphrodite appears most often on the coins of Nagidos, indicating that her sanctuary must have been the most important in the city.

=== The Hellenistic period and the foundation of Arsinoe ===
In 333 BC the city was conquered along with the rest of Cilicia by Alexander the Great. After his death Cilicia briefly came under the control of the Seleucid Empire. Together with Mallos the city participated in the foundation of Antioch on the Maeander somewhere between 281 and 270 BC. In approximately 270 BC Cilicia was conquered by the Ptolemaic Empire during the Syrian Wars.

In this period the city of Arsinoe was founded between 279 and 260–253 BC on land taken from Nagidos by Aetos, the Ptolemaic strategos or military governor of Cilicia. Aetos was succeeded as strategos by his son Thraseas. At that time the Nagidians still refused to recognize the settlers of Arsinoe as the new owners of the land. To resolve the dispute Thraseas requested Nagidos to cede the land to Arsinoe, which in exchange became apoikoia of Nagidos. That way, Arsinoe would be independent from Nagidos, but Nagidos was officially made the symbolic "mother city" of Arsinoe. Both cities exchanged isopoliteia so that the citizens of both places enjoyed a single citizenship.

Designating the citizens of Arsinoe as apokoi of Nagidos meant that Nagidos was treated as the mother city of Arsinoe. Christian Habicht interprets this as a diplomatic move of Thraseas to appease Nagidos for its loss of territory. John K. Davies gives a slightly different chronology, estimating the foundation of Arsinoe to have taken place probably in the 260s BC. He writes that Cilicia was then temporarily lost to the Seleucids but retaken by Ptolemaics in the 240s. According to him the dispute over the land occurred after the reestablishment of Ptolemaic control and the Arsinoeis appealed to Thraseas some time after 238 BC.

Along with the rest of Cilicia, Nagidos came under Seleucid rule in 197 BC. Excavations have shown that the city was abandoned towards the middle of the second century BC. Possibly this was a consequence of the activities of the Cilician pirates.

== Excavations ==
Ancient sources gave an important clue to the location of Nagidos because they mention the island Nagidoussa lay offshore from the city. This allowed the Austrian archaeologists Rudolf Heberdey and Adolf Wilhelm to identify the site at its current location in 1891. In the 1930s a Swedish expedition carried out explorations. In 1986 the museum of Anamur discovered 24 graves, the oldest dating back to the fifth century BC.

== Sources ==
- Habicht, Christian (2006). The Hellenistic Monarchies: Selected Papers. Translated by Peregrine Stevenson. Ann Arbor, MI: University of Michigan Press. ISBN 9780472111091.
- Pfeiffer, Stefan (2015). Griechische und lateinische Inschriften zum Ptolemäerreich und zur römischen Provinz Aegyptus. Einführungen und Quellentexte zur Ägyptologie (in German). Vol. 9. Münster: Lit. pp. 91–99.
