= Hoca Kadri Efendi =

Ottoman journalist and political figure (1855–1918)

- Born: Hoca Mehmet Kadri Nâsıh; 1855; Sanjak of Herzegovina, Ottoman Empire
- Died: 1918 (aged 62–63); Paris, France
- Education: Darülfünun
- Occupation: Teacher

Hoca Kadri Efendi (1855–1918) was an Ottoman teacher, journalist and political figure who was among the early figures of the Young Turks which would form the Committee of Union and Progress.

== Early life and education ==
Kadri was born in a village in Herzegovina in 1855 into a Bosniak family. He was raised in Konitsa and worked there as a shepherd. He went to Constantinople at age 21 and attended Fatih Madrasa. He graduated from Darülmuallimîn (Ottoman Turkish: Teacher Training School) in 1881 and received a degree in teaching. Then he was educated at Darülfünun, precursor of Istanbul University.

Kadri learned many languages during his education, including Arabic, Persian, French, English and Russian.

== Career and activities ==
Kadri worked as a teacher at various secondary schools in Constantinople. One of his pupils was Mehmet Akif Ersoy who reported that Hoca Kadri had a significant effect on his future career. Although Kadri was a very successful and influential educator, he had to leave Constantinople in 1896 due to the repression of the Ottoman Sultan Abdul Hamid II and his involvement in opposition activities. Hoca Kadri settled in Cairo and cofounded a magazine, Kanun-i Esasi, with the other Young Turks in December 1896. He also established another publication, Havâtır, in 1898 and edited the title until 1901.

Over time Hoca Kadri became the leader of the Young Turks in Egypt, but was excluded from the group in 1899. Following this incident he was still part of the group without being affiliated with any faction. He settled in Paris in late 1901 to collaborate with Ahmet Rıza who was leading the Young Turks there. Hoca Kadri participated in the Congress of Young Turks held in Paris on 4 February 1902. He published two books; İstinsaf and Zulüm ve Adl.

== Personal life and death ==
Hoca Kadri was married, and his two sons exiled with him into Cairo in 1896. He died in Paris in 1918.
