= Lenger, Bozyazı =

Lenger
- Neighbourhood
- Location in Turkey
- Coordinates: 36°15′N 33°09′E
- Country: Turkey
- Province: Mersin
- District: Bozyazı
- Elevation: 950 m (3,120 ft)
- Population (2022): 189
- Time zone: UTC+3 (TRT)
- Area code: 0324

Lenger is a neighbourhood in the municipality and district of Bozyazı, Mersin Province, Turkey. Its population is 189 (2022). It is situated at the northeast of Bozyazı. The distance to Bozyazı is 35 kilometres (22 mi) and the distance to Mersin is 200 kilometres (120 mi).
