= Hoçë e Vogël =

Village in western Kosovo

Hoçë e Vogël Hoçë e Vogël
- Village
- Location in Kosovo
- Location: Kosovo
- District: Gjakova
- Municipality: Rahovec

Population (2024)
  - Total: 987
- Time zone: UTC+1 (CET)
  - Summer (DST): UTC+2 (CEST)

Hoçë e Vogël (Albanian: Hoçë e Vogël) (Serbian: Mala Hoča/Мала Хоча) is a village in the municipality of Rahovec of the District of Gjakova.

== Demographics ==
In 2024, the village had a total population of 987 people. The entire population of the village were Albanians

== History ==
The village of Hoçë e Vogël was mentioned as 'Dolina Hoça' in the Ottoman register of the 16th century. The inhabitants of Hoçë e Vogël had Islamic and Albanian anthropology. The villagers exhibited a blend of anthropological traits, reflecting both Islamic and Albanian characteristics (ex. Mustafa Pjetri, Veli Gjini, Mehmed Gjini etc.). The mansions (‘Bashtina’) listed bore names that were Islamic and Albanian, with a small presence of Slavic names.

During the Kosovo War, on 1–2 April, more than 40 civilians, including women and children from Hoçë e Vogël were killed.
