= Akova, Gülnar =

Akova
- Neighbourhood
- Location in Turkey
- Coordinates: 36°24′N 33°12′E
- Country: Turkey
- Province: Mersin
- District: Gülnar
- Elevation: 1,370 m (4,490 ft)
- Population (2022): 131
- Time zone: UTC+3 (TRT)
- Postal code: 33702
- Area code: 0324

Akova is a neighbourhood in the municipality and district of Gülnar, Mersin Province, Turkey. Its population is 131 (2022). It is situated in the Taurus Mountains to the west of Gülnar. Distance to Gülnar is 25 kilometres (16 mi) and to Mersin is 174 kilometres (108 mi).
