= Kızılca, Bozyazı =

Kızılca
- Neighbourhood
- Location in Turkey
- Coordinates: 36°19′N 33°04′E
- Country: Turkey
- Province: Mersin
- District: Bozyazı
- Elevation: 1,120 m (3,670 ft)
- Population (2022): 239
- Time zone: UTC+3 (TRT)
- Area code: 0324

Kızılca is a neighbourhood in the municipality and district of Bozyazı, Mersin Province, Turkey. Its population is 239 (2022). It is situated in the Taurus Mountains to the north of Bozyazı. The distance to Bozyazı is 28 kilometres (17 mi) and the distance to Mersin is 217 kilometres (135 mi).
