= Hacıbayram, Bayat =

Village in Turkey

Coordinates: 40.62350°N 34.35524°E

Hacıbayram
- Village
- Location in Turkey
- Coordinates
- Country: Turkey
- Province: Çorum
- District: Bayat
- Population (2022): 124
- Time zone: UTC+3 (TRT)

Hacıbayram is a village in the Bayat District of Çorum Province in Turkey. Its population is 124 (2022).
