= Üçoluk, Gülnar =

Üçoluk
- Neighbourhood
- Location in Turkey
- Coordinates: 36°24′N 33°24′E
- Country: Turkey
- Province: Mersin
- District: Gülnar
- Elevation: 1,145 m (3,757 ft)
- Population (2022): 357
- Time zone: UTC+3 (TRT)
- Postal code: 33702
- Area code: 0324

Üçoluk (literally "three ditches") is a neighbourhood in the municipality and district of Gülnar, Mersin Province, Turkey. Its population is 357 (2022). Its distance to Gülnar is 7 kilometres (4.3 mi) and to Mersin is 157 kilometres (98 mi). The main economic activity is agriculture.
