= Bayat, Çorum =

Bayat
- Municipality
- Location within Turkey
- Coordinates: 40°38′46″N 34°15′40″E
- Country: Turkey
- Province: Çorum
- District: Bayat

Government
  - Mayor: Ekrem Ünlü (AKP)
- Population (2022): 5,613
- Time zone: UTC+3 (TRT)
- Area code: 0364
- Climate: Csb
- Website: corumbayat.bel.tr

Bayat is a town in Çorum Province in the Black Sea region of Turkey. It is located at 83 km from the city of Çorum, near the town of İskilip. It is the seat of Bayat District. Its population is 5,613 (2022). It has an elevation of 625 m. The mayor is Ekrem Ünlü (AKP).

== Geography ==
Bayat is located at high altitude above the Black Sea coast, but has the character of a central Anatolian district. The town stands in a valley of the River Bayat, a tributary of the Kızılırmak that runs down from the surrounding mountains including the 2013 m Mount Öbek.

In the mountain villages in the north of the district people live on forestry and herding livestock, there are also a number of coal mines. Many families have migrated to larger cities in search of jobs, or go as seasonal labour in the construction industry. There is better farmland in the valley floor along with flour and feed mills.

The town of Bayat provides schools, health care and other basic amenities to the villages in the district.

== History ==
Bayat was founded as a settlement during its occupation by the ancient Persian Empire. Bayat was settled in the 13th century by the Bayat tribe of the Oghuz Turks, who were widespread in Anatolia and have given their name to over 50 towns and villages in Turkey.
