= Bəydili, Salyan =

Bəydili is a village and municipality in the Salyan Rayon of Azerbaijan. It has a population of 449.
