= Toyhane, Bayat =

Village in Turkey

Toyhane
- Village
- Location in Turkey
- Coordinates: 40°31′07″N 34°15′08″E
- Country: Turkey
- Province: Çorum
- District: Bayat
- Population (2022): 286
- Time zone: UTC+3 (TRT)

Toyhane is a village in the Bayat District of Çorum Province in Turkey. Its population is 286 (2022).
