= Tekmen, Bozyazı =

Settlement in Turkey

Tekmen
- Neighbourhood
- Location in Turkey
- Coordinates: 36°06′N 33°04′E
- Country: Turkey
- Province: Mersin
- District: Bozyazı
- Population (2022): 2,913
- Time zone: UTC+3 (TRT)
- Postal code: 33830
- Area code: 0324

Tekmen is a neighbourhood in the municipality and district of Bozyazı, Mersin Province, Turkey. Its population is 2,913 (2022). Before the 2013 reorganisation, it was a town (belde).

== Geography ==
Tekmen is a Mediterranean coastal town. The Toros mountains are just north of the town and the coastal plain of the town is a narrow strip between the sea and the mountains. The Mountains are covered by maquis shrubland and red pine forests. Tekmen is 5 km (3.1 mi) east of Bozyazı and 196 km (122 mi) west of Mersin on the Mersin Antalya highway D.400.

== People ==
The residents of Tekmen are members of a Turkmen tribe named Teke, which is known to be the founder of Teke Beylik in southeastern Anatolia in the 13th and 14th centuries. They were originally nomads on the Toros mountains. In 1989, Tekmen was declared township.

== Economy ==
In Tekmen, greenhouse agriculture and animal husbandry are two important economic activities. However, animal husbandry is now on the decline. The most important crops are vegetables, citrus, strawberries, bananas and peanuts.

Although tourism has not yet arrived in Tekmen, many people from Anatolian region bought summer houses here and the touristic potential of the town is promising.
