= Akova, Argos =

Human settlement in Greece

Akova Άκοβα
- Settlement
- Location within Greece
- Country: Greece
- Administrative region: Peloponnese
- Regional unit: Argolis
- Municipality: Argos-Mykines
- Municipal unit: Argos
- Community: Argos

Population (2021)
  - Total: 141
- Time zone: UTC+2 (EET)
  - Summer (DST): UTC+3 (EEST)
- Postal code: 21250
- Area code: 2751

Akova (Greek: Άκοβα) is a settlement in the community and municipal unit of Argos, Greece. Akova is 4 km west of downtown Argos. There are an Agia Triada church and a rest area for those hiking around Larissa mountain.

== Historical population ==
Year	Population
1981	479
1991	152
2001	199
2011	167
2021	141

== See also ==
- List of settlements in Argolis
