= Bəydili, Bilasuvar =

Bəydili
- Municipality
- Location within Azerbaijan
- Coordinates: 39°28′14″N 48°34′06″E
- Country: Azerbaijan
- Rayon: Bilasuvar

Population
  - Total: 5,276
- Time zone: UTC+4 (AZT)

Bəydili (also, Beydili and Begdeli) is a village and municipality in the Bilasuvar Rayon of Azerbaijan. It has a population of 5,276.
