= Çukuröz, Bayat =

Village in Turkey

Çukuröz
- Village
- Location in Turkey
- Coordinates: 40.794°N 34.104°E
- Country: Turkey
- Province: Çorum
- District: Bayat
- Population (2022): 698
- Time zone: UTC+3 (TRT)

Çukuröz is a village in the Bayat District of Çorum Province in Turkey. Its population is 698 (2022).
