= Bəydili, Yevlakh =

Bəydili
- Location within Azerbaijan
- Coordinates: 40°43′01″N 47°10′01″E
- Country: Azerbaijan
- Rayon: Yevlakh
- Municipality: Gülövşə
- Time zone: UTC+4 (AZT)
  - Summer (DST): UTC+5 (AZT)

Bəydili (also, Beydilli) is a village in the Yevlakh Rayon of Azerbaijan. The village forms part of the municipality of Gülövşə.
