= Büyükeceli =

- Neighbourhood
- Location in Turkey
- Coordinates: 36°11′N 33°33′E
- Country: Turkey
- Province: Mersin
- District: Gülnar
- Elevation: 60 m (200 ft)
- Population (2022): 2,529
- Time zone: UTC+3 (TRT)
- Postal code: 33702
- Area code: 0324

Büyükeceli is a neighbourhood in the municipality and district of Gülnar, Mersin Province, Turkey. Its population is 2,529 (2022). Before the 2013 reorganisation, it was a town (belde).

== Geography ==
Büyükeceli had been founded on the southern slopes of Toros Mountains. It is near to Mediterranean coast (3 km (1.9 mi)) and recent housing of the town is almost at the seaside. It is on the Mersin Antalya highway. The highway distance to Gülnar is 35 km (22 mi) and to Mersin is 140 km (87 mi).

== Economy ==
The main economic activity is agriculture. Tomato, cucumber and aubergine are the most important crops. Fishing and animal husbandry are among the other activities.

== Nuclear plant ==
Akkuyu nuclear power plant is being built near Büyükeceli. A hotel in the area, known as the Günaştı Sunset Hotel, had to be sold and shut down due to the proximity to what would be the nuclear plant. But there are serious objections to the project (see Human chain against nuclear plant in Turkey).The most important objection is that Büyükeceli and the surrounding coastline may lose its touristic potential after the realization of the project. Büyükeceli residents are also worried that the already low population of the town may further decrease and the town may lose its township status. The government on the other hand, prefers this site because of the low population density and low risk of earthquakes.
