= Beydili, Gülnar =

Beydili
- Neighbourhood
- Location in Turkey
- Coordinates: 36°14′N 33°26′E
- Country: Turkey
- Province: Mersin
- District: Gülnar
- Elevation: 560 m (1,840 ft)
- Population (2022): 83
- Time zone: UTC+3 (TRT)
- Postal code: 33702
- Area code: 0324

Beydili is a neighbourhood in the municipality and district of Gülnar, Mersin Province, Turkey. Its population is 83 (2022). It is situated in the mountainous area to the south of Gülnar. The distance to Gülnar is 20 kilometres (12 mi) and to Mersin is 155 kilometres (96 mi).
