= Sipahili =

- Neighbourhood
- Location in Turkey
- Coordinates: 36°10′N 33°28′E
- Country: Turkey
- Province: Mersin
- District: Gülnar
- Elevation: 50 m (160 ft)
- Population (2022): 367
- Time zone: UTC+3 (TRT)
- Postal code: 33702
- Area code: 0324

Sipahili (former Babadıl) is a neighbourhood in the municipality and district of Gülnar, Mersin Province, Turkey. Its population is 367 (2022). It is situated at the east bank of a creek. It is on the state highway D.400. The distance to Gülnar is 41 kilometres (25 mi) and to Mersin is 148 kilometres (92 mi).
