= Gülnar =

- District and municipality
- Map showing Gülnar District in Mersin Province

- Location in Turkey
- Coordinates: 36°20′20″N 33°23′55″E
- Country: Turkey
- Province: Mersin

Government
  - Mayor: Fatih Önge (MHP)
- Area: 1,416 km^{2} (547 sq mi)
- Elevation: 960 m (3,150 ft)
- Population (2022): 27,889
  - Density: 19.70/km^{2} (51.01/sq mi)
- Time zone: UTC+3 (TRT)
- Postal code: 33700
- Area code: 0324
- Website: www.gulnar.bel.tr

Gülnar is a municipality and district of Mersin Province, Turkey. Its area is 1,416 km^{2}, and its population is 27,889 (2022). It is 150 km (93 mi) south-west of the city of Mersin.

== Geography ==
The town of Gülnar is 32 km (20 mi) inland on a plain high in the Taurus Mountains, attractive countryside known for its vineyards and its green meadows used for summer grazing. Gülnar is a small town providing high schools and other basic amenities to the surrounding villages. The road from central Anatolia to Anamur on the Mediterranean coast passes through here, one of the windiest roads imaginable, making Gülnar a remote district indeed.

About 20% of the land area of Gülnar is cultivated area, much of which is vineyards, other important crops are grains and chick peas. The high meadows are used for summer grazing.

== History ==
The area has been occupied since the time of the Hittites, and was later settled by the Assyrians, Persians, Egyptians, Greeks, Romans and Armenians. The people of Gülnar today are descendants of the Turkmen tribes that came here from Central Asia in the 13th century. (Among older generation of Turkmens Gülnar is usually named as Anaypazarı)

== Composition ==
There are 50 neighbourhoods in Gülnar District:

- Akdeniz
- Akova
- Ardıçpınarı
- Arıkuyusu
- Ayvalı
- Bereket
- Beydili
- Bolyaran
- Bozağaç
- Büyükeceli
- Çavuşlar
- Çukurasma
- Çukurkonak
- Dayıcık
- Dedeler
- Delikkaya
- Demirözü
- Emirhacı
- Gezende
- Göktürk
- Hacıpınar
- Halifeler
- Ilısu
- İshaklar
- Kavakoluğu
- Kayrak
- Koçaşlı
- Konur
- Korucuk
- Köseçobanlı
- Kurbağa
- Kuskan
- Mollaömerli
- Örenpınar
- Örtülü
- Saray
- Sarıkavak
- Şeyhömer
- Sipahili
- Taşoluk
- Tepe
- Tırnak
- Tozkovan
- Üçoluk
- Ulupınar
- Yanışlı
- Yarmasu
- Yassıbağ
- Yenice
- Zeyne

== See also ==
- Gülnar Hatun
