= Bozyazı =

- District and municipality
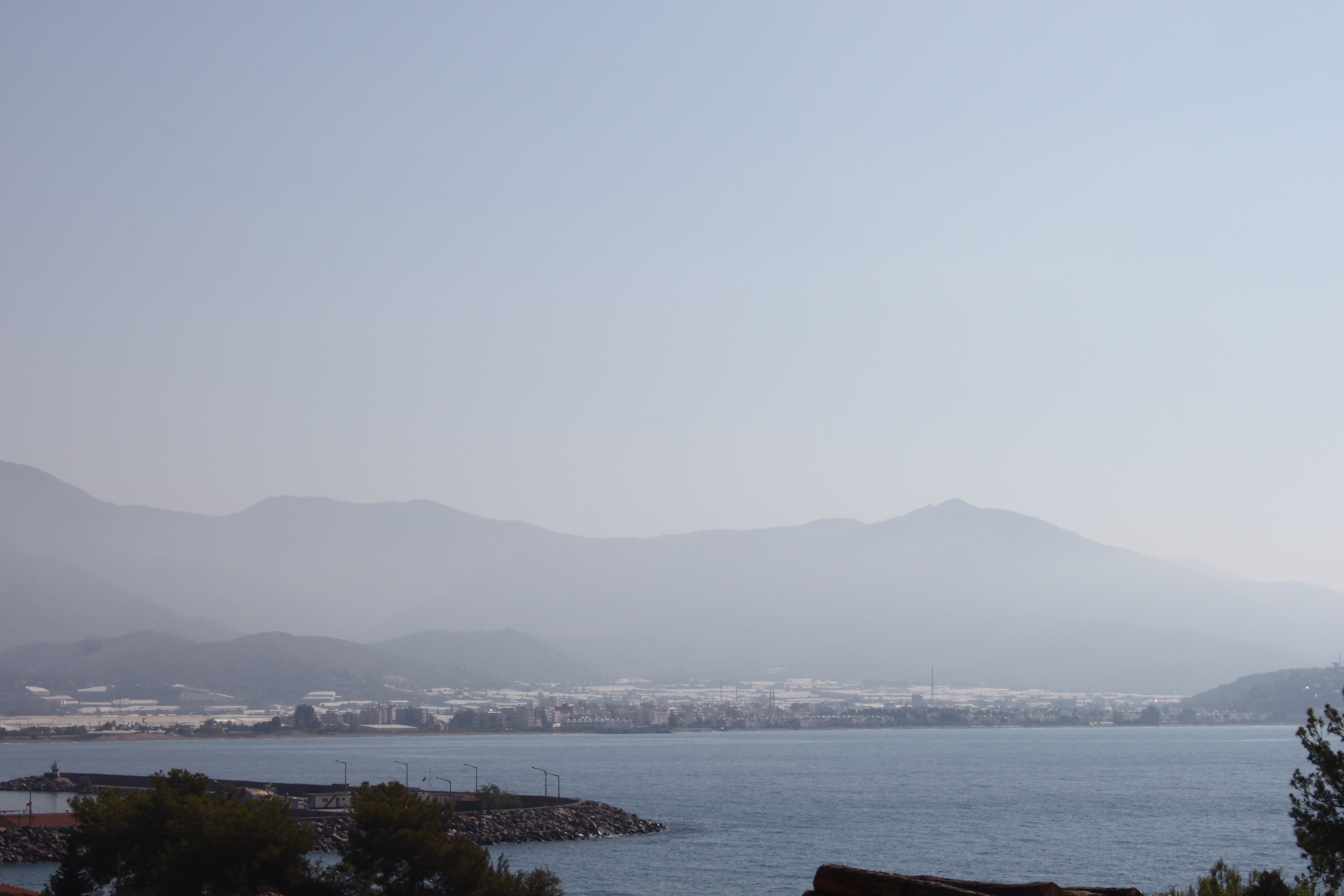

- Map showing Bozyazı District in Mersin Province

- Location within Turkey
- Coordinates: 36°06′N 32°58′E
- Country: Turkey
- Province: Mersin

Government
  - Mayor: Mustafa Çetinkaya (MHP)
- Area: 642 km^{2} (248 sq mi)
- Population (2022): 26,812
  - Density: 41.8/km^{2} (108/sq mi)
- Time zone: UTC+3 (TRT)
- Area code: 0324
- Website: www.bozyazi.bel.tr

Bozyazı is a municipality and district of Mersin Province, Turkey. Its area is 642 km^{2}, and its population is 26,812 (2022). It is on the Mediterranean coast, 220 km (137 mi) west of the city of Mersin.

== Geography ==
Bozyazı is a remote coastal district with the Taurus Mountains as a backdrop; The roads over the mountains or along the coast from either direction are very difficult to drive making Bozyazı too far from large cities or the established centres of tourism to attract many visitors, so the district is quiet and unspoilt. However there are developments of holiday flats in some places, mainly owned by people from Konya and Ankara as well as foreigners. The sea is clean and Bozyazı is home to an important colony of the endangered Mediterranean monk seal.

The narrow coastal strip has a temperate climate and is used to grow bananas along with strawberries, citrus fruits, ground-nuts, and a variety vegetables and fruits. The higher land (over 50% of the district) meanwhile is used for apples and walnuts. There are areas of cedar and fir trees.

The highest peaks are Tol Dağı (1,250 m), Azıtepe (780 m), Susmak Dağı (1,600 m), Kaş Dağı (1,639 m) and Elmakuzu Dağı (1,690 m), there are areas of high meadow in these mountains used for summer grazing. Bozyazı river rushes off Elmakız through a rocky gorge, there is a dam and hyrodelectric power station 14 km north of Bozyazı.

About 60% of the population lives in the town of Bozyazı, a small town providing high schools and healthcare to the surrounding villages. There are two other small towns (Tekmen and Tekeli) and about 40 villages. The biggest village is Karaisali. These are quiet places where the people are conservative; old and young spend the evenings sitting by the sea spitting out sunflower and pumpkin seeds; there is little nightlife, maybe the odd restaurant with a piano player.

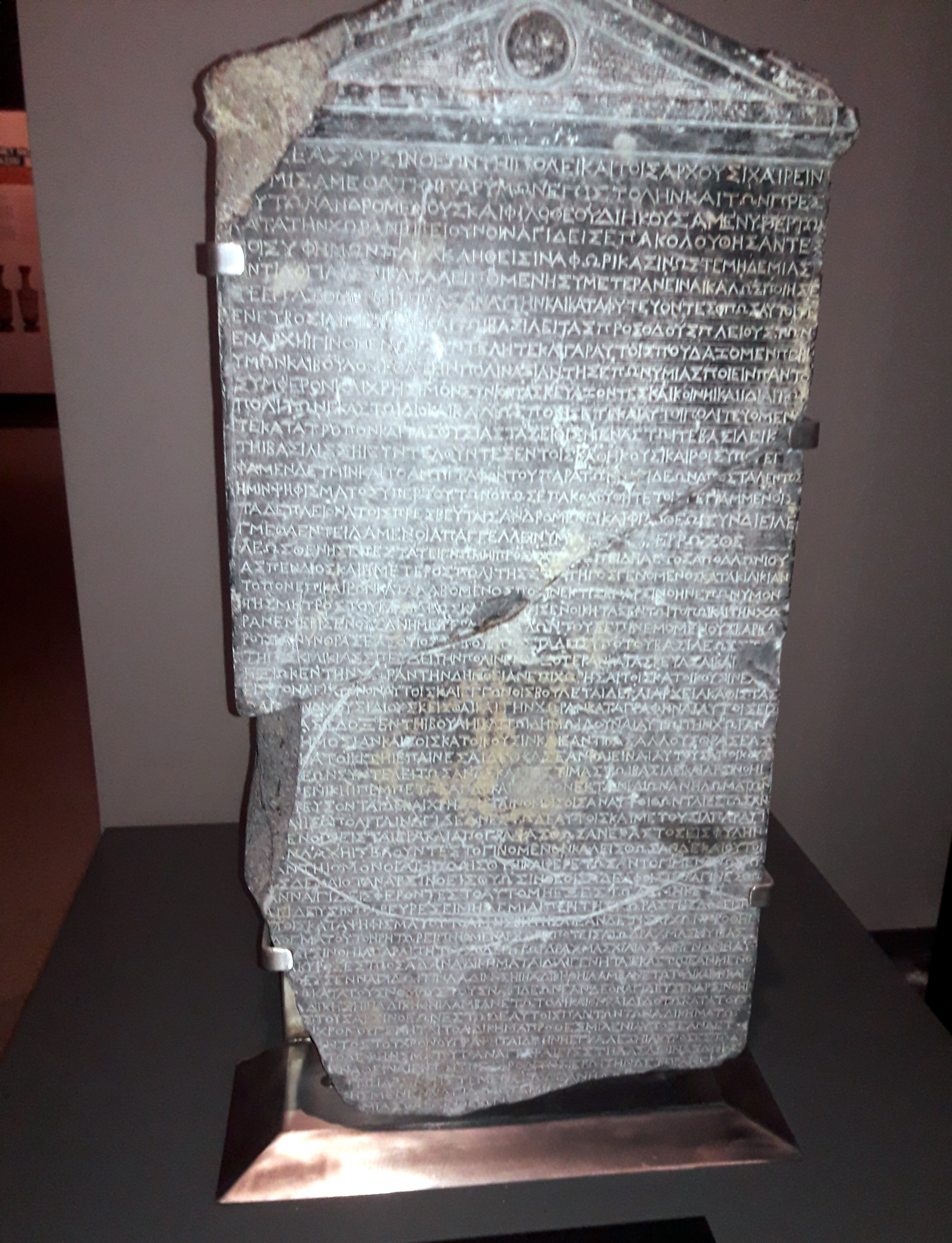
Nagidos inscription in Mersin Archaeological Museum

== History ==
The ruins of the ancient Greek city of Nagidos are on a hill above the town of Bozyazı. They are being excavated by a team from Mersin University who have found traces of occupation going back to the Hellenistic period of the 4th century BC, when Nagidos was an outpost of Rhodes and Samos, a small port established to trade goods from Egypt and Cyprus. The town was subsequently controlled by Ptolemaic Empire, Ancient Romans, Byzantines, Cilician Armenia and Seljuk Turks.

== Composition ==
There are 26 neighbourhoods in Bozyazı District:

- Akcami
- Ardıçlıtaş
- Bahçekoyağı
- Beyreli
- Çopurlu
- Çubukkoyağı
- Denizciler
- Derebaşı
- Dereköy
- Elmakuzu
- Gözce
- Gözsüzce
- Gürlevik
- Kaledibi
- Karaisalı
- Kızılca
- Kömürlü
- Kötekler
- Lenger
- Merkez
- Narince
- Sıcakyurt
- Tekedüzü
- Tekeli
- Tekmen
- Ustalar
