= List of islands of Turkey =

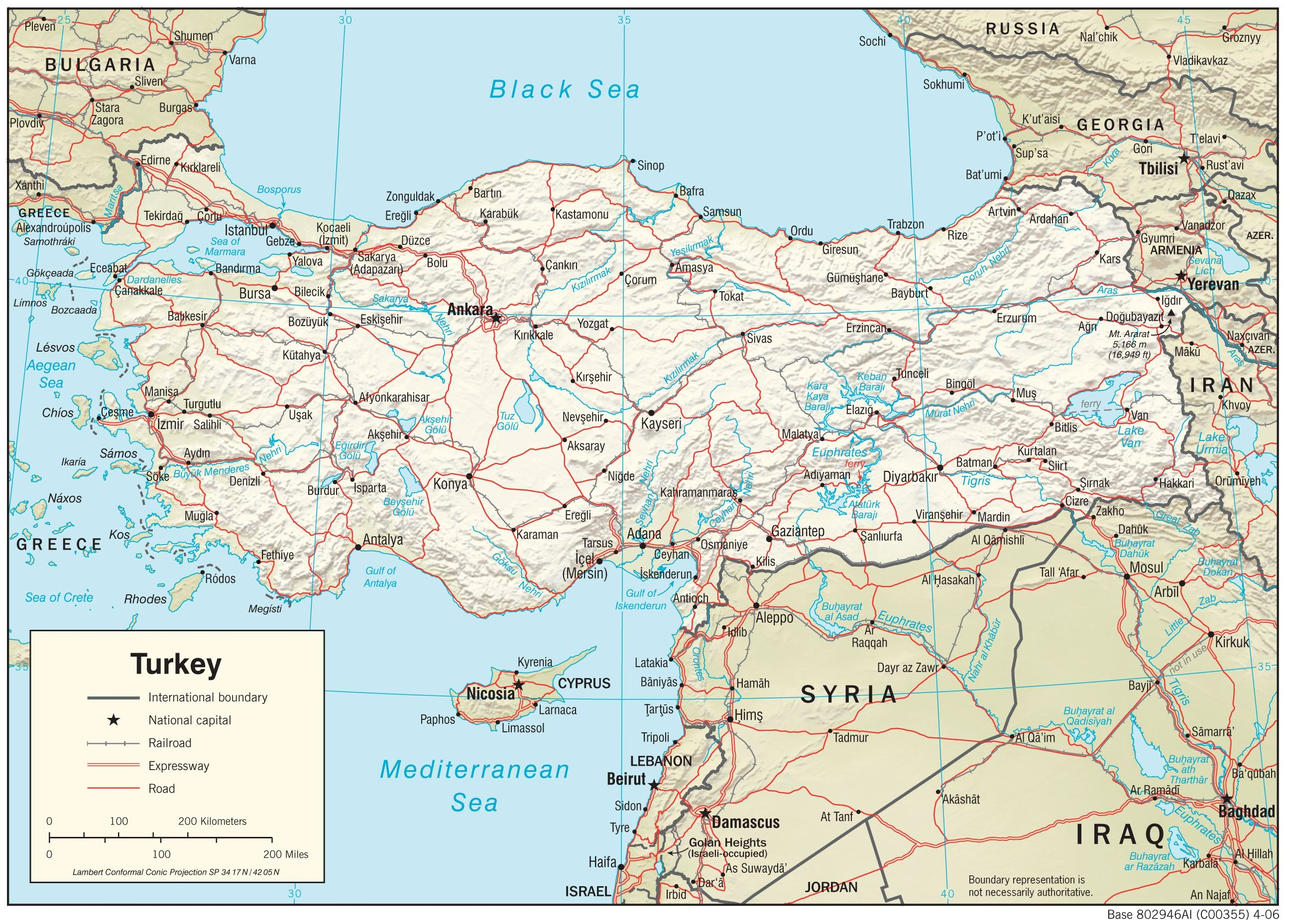
Map of Turkiye and seas in and around Turkiye

This is a list of islands of Turkiye. There are around 500 islands and islets in Turkiye. These islands are located in the Aegean Sea, Black Sea, Mediterranean Sea, Sea of Marmara, and Turkish lakes. The Turkish words for island/islands are ada/adalar. The largest Turkish island is Gökçeada in the Aegean Sea with an area of 297 km^{2} (115 sq mi). The lists in the following sections include the islands' names, formal names if different, provinces, seas where they are located, and coordinates.

== Islands by body of water ==
=== Aegean Sea islands ===
The following islands are in the Aegean Sea:

==== Aydın Province ====
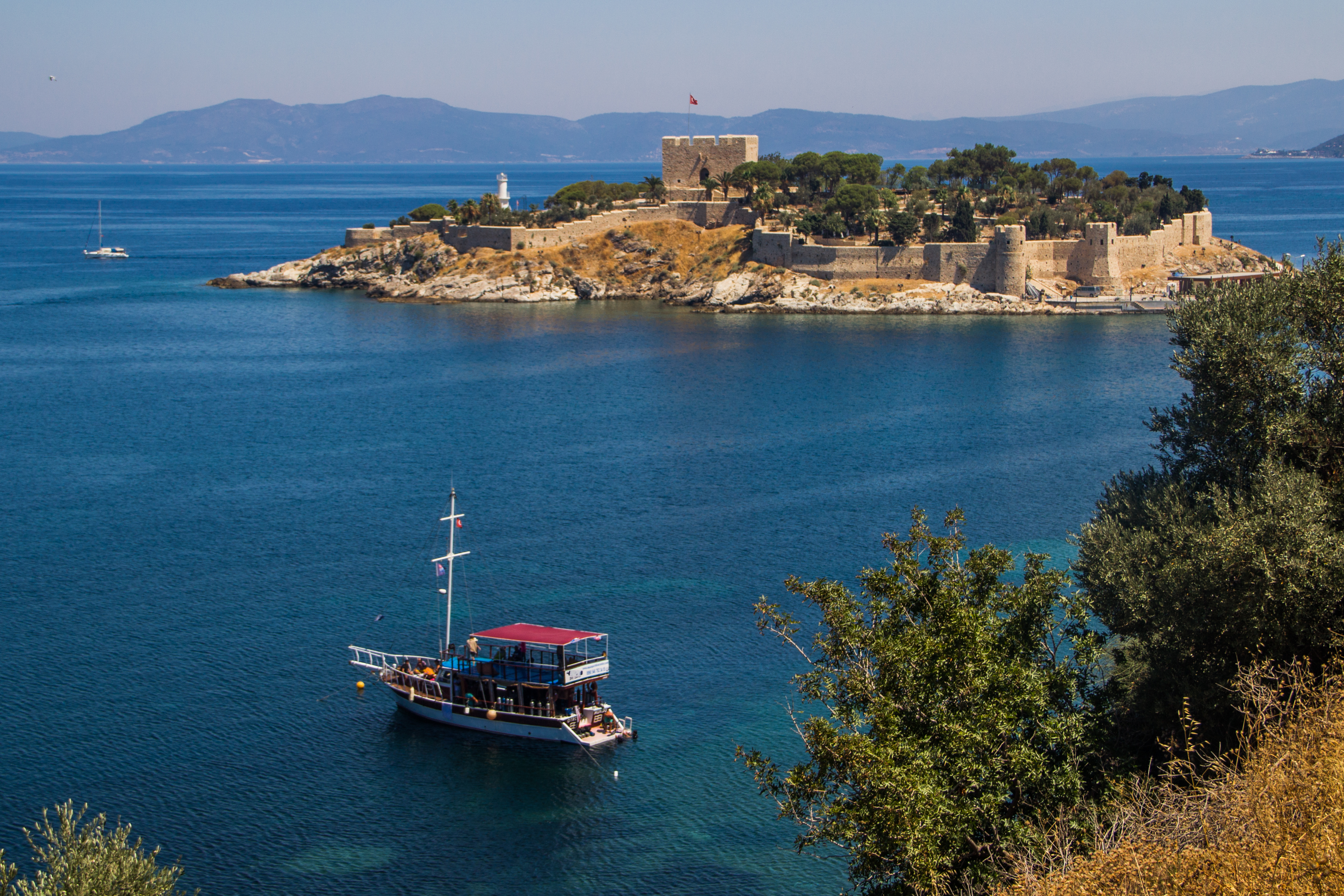
Güvercin Island, Aydın Province

Location of Aegean Sea islands in Aydın Province of Turkiye
Name	Province	Coordinates
Bayrak Adası (Abanoz Island)	Aydın	37°41′31″N 27°01′01″E
Çil Adası (Note: Çil Adası is also known as Çilada, Tavşan Adası, Theopori Island, Vrachonisida, Vrachonisída Theopori)	Aydın	37°39′03″N 27°00′11″E
Dalaman Adası	Aydın	37°28′25″N 27°12′15″E
Dalyan Islands	Aydın	
Dipburnu Island	Aydın	
Gökada	Aydın	37°20′52″N 27°20′25″E
Güvercinada	Aydın	37°51′49″N 27°14′52″E
İkizce	Aydın	
Karahayıt Islands	Aydın	
Kuyulu Island	Aydın	
Panayır Adası (Altınada)	Aydın	37°19′37″N 27°19′51″E
Saplı Island	Aydın	
Sandal Adası	Aydın	37°38′53″N 27°00′53″E
Su Adası	Aydın	37°39′16″N 27°00′42″E
Yeşilada (Plaka Island)	Aydın	37°25′13″N 27°12′55″E

==== Balıkesir Province ====
There are at least 54 islands in Balıkesir Province, including islands in the Aegean Sea and the Sea of Marmara. Many of the islands in the Aegean Sea are part of the Ayvalık Islands Nature Park which contains 22 islands and numerous rocks. The only two populated Aegean islands are Cunda Island and Lale Island. Cunda Island, which is now a peninsula, is the largest. The following islands of Balıkesir Province are in the Aegean Sea:

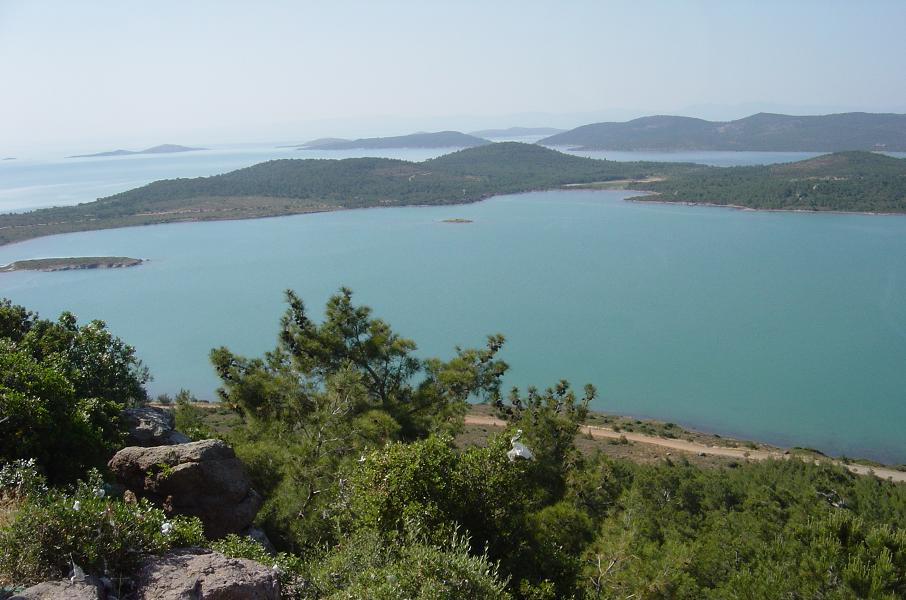
Ayvalık Islands

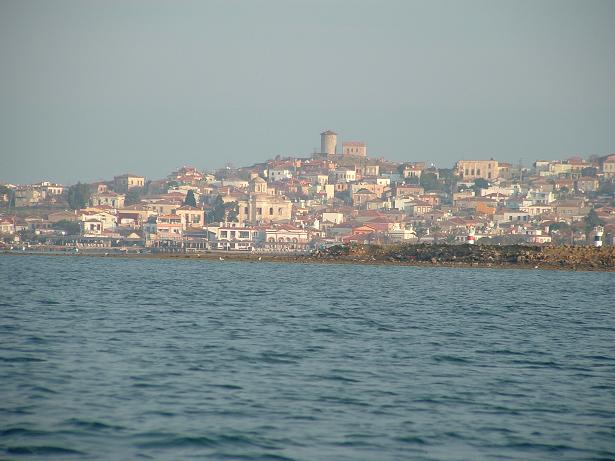
Cunda Island

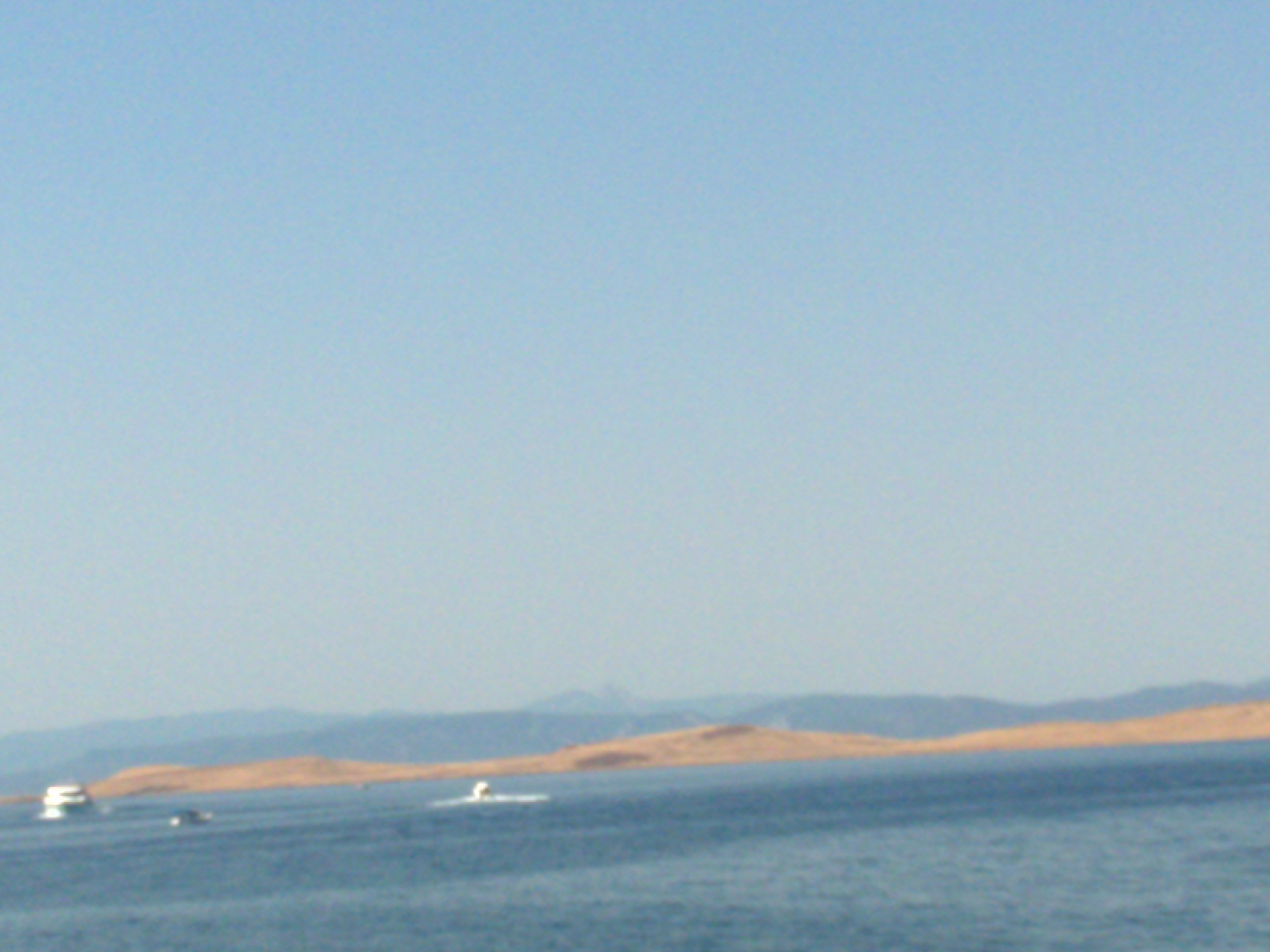
Çıplak Ada

Location of Aegean Sea islands in Balıkesir Province of Turkiye
Name	Province	Coordinates
Akoğlu Adası (Kedi Island)	Balıkesir	39°20′59″N 26°42′50″E
Akvaryum (Karaada) (Note: Part of Ayvalık Islands Nature Park)	Balıkesir	
Aslı Adacığı	Balıkesir	39°23′36″N 26°46′35″E
Ayvalık Islands Nature Park	Balıkesir	39°20′51″N 26°37′18″E
Büyük İlyosta	Balıkesir	39°19′36″N 26°32′14″E
Büyük Maden	Balıkesir	39°23′N 26°35′E
Balık Adası (Büyük Karaada)	Balıkesir	39°22′42″N 26°42′25″E
Balkan Island (Kutu Island)	Balıkesir	39°22′13″N 26°41′47″E
Büyükkaraada	Balıkesir	
Cunda or Alibey	Balıkesir	39°21′38″N 26°38′34″E
Çiçek Adası	Balıkesir	39°22′35″N 26°45′57″E
Çıplak Ada or Gymno Island	Balıkesir	39°17′13″N 26°35′30″E
Gizlikayalar	Balıkesir	
Haşır Adası	Balıkesir	39°21′12″N 26°40′08″E
Kalamopulo	Balıkesir	
İkizkayalar Island	Balıkesir	
Kalemli	Balıkesir	
Kamış or Kara Ada	Balıkesir	39°20′25″N 26°34′38″E
Kara Ada (Kalamo)	Balıkesir	39°20′25″N 26°34′38″E
Kara Ada (Kodon)	Balıkesir	39°22′13″N 26°41′47″E
Kayabaşı or Taş Adası	Balıkesir	39°21′33″N 26°43′18″E
Kız Adası	Balıkesir	39°24′26″N 26°42′32″E
Kızlarmanastırı	Balıkesir	
Kumru Adası	Balıkesir	39°17′57″N 26°38′09″E
Küçükmaden Adası	Balıkesir	39°22′52″N 26°34′22″E
Küçük Karaada	Balıkesir	
Lale Island (Note: Lale Island is literally Tulip Island.) (also called Dolap Island)	Balıkesir	39°20′43″N 26°41′31″E
Melina Island	Balıkesir	
Mırmırcalar	Balıkesir	
Pınar Adası (Kılavuz Ada)	Balıkesir	39°20′16″N 26°36′18″E
Pirgos Islets	Balıkesir	
Sazlıada	Balıkesir	
Taşlı Ada	Balıkesir	39°21′07″N 26°36′00″E
Tavuk Adası	Balıkesir	39°19′24″N 26°39′30″E
Tūzüner Island	Balıkesir	
Yalnız Island	Balıkesir	39°21′32″N 26°35′27″E
Yelken Adası	Balıkesir	39°21′16″N 26°35′22″E
Yellice Adası (Poyraz Island or İncirli Island)	Balıkesir	39°20′48″N 26°35′42″E
Küçük İlyosta (Yumurta Island),	Balıkesir	39°22′42″N 26°43′34″E
Topan Island	Balıkesir	
Yumurta Adası	Balıkesir	39°19′17″N 26°31′40″E
Yuvarlak Adası	Balıkesir	39°20′09″N 26°33′40″E

==== Çanakkale Province ====
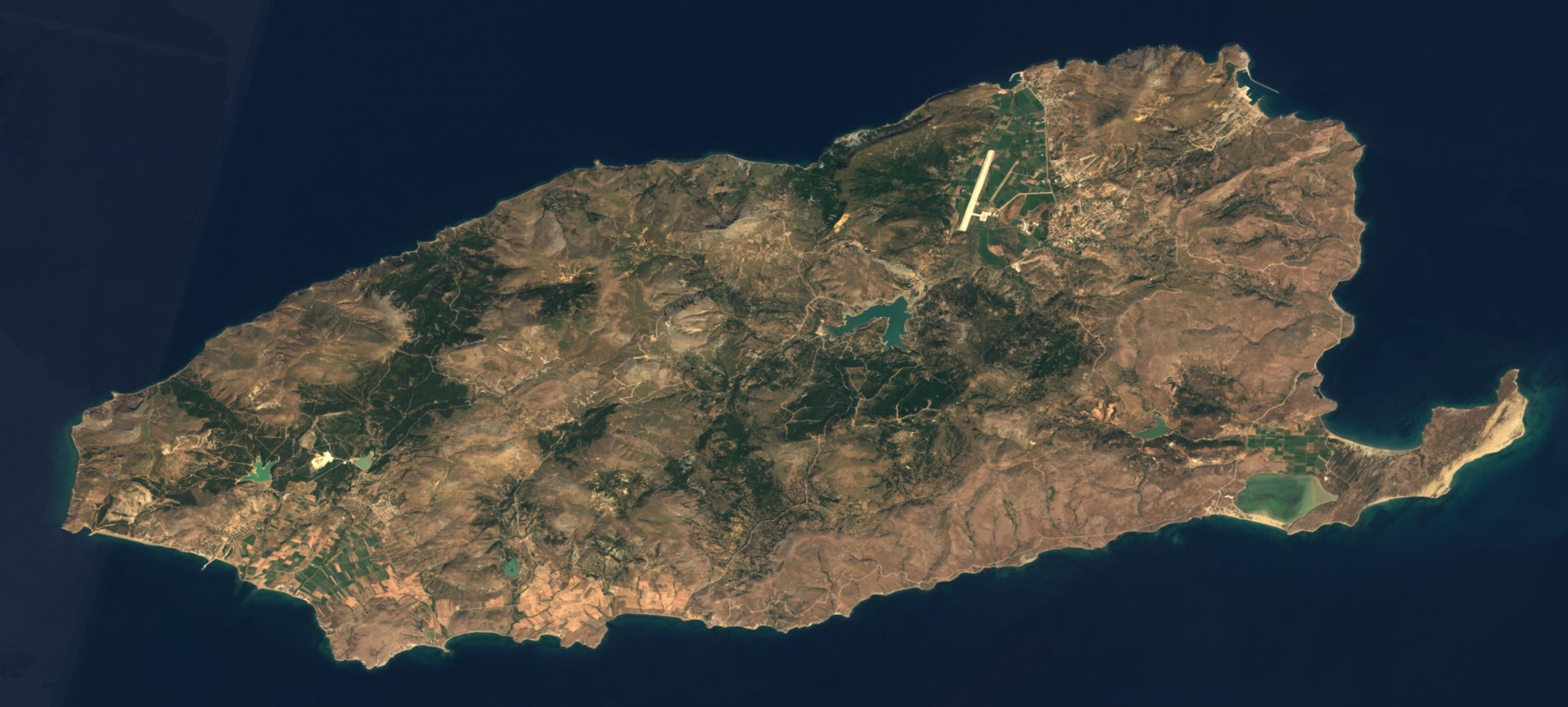
Imbros or Gökçeada Island, the largest island in Turkiye

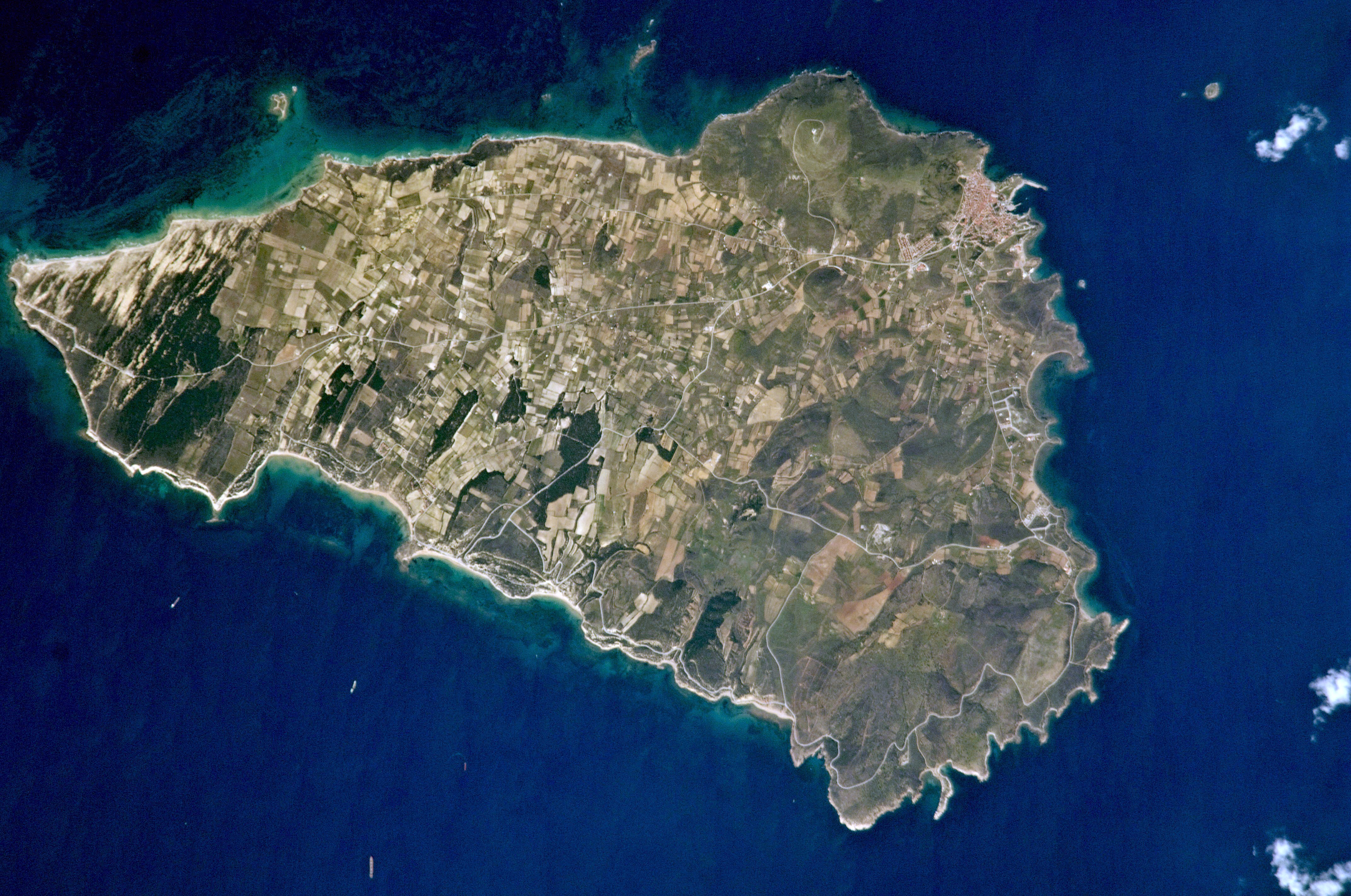
Satellite image of Bozcaada Island

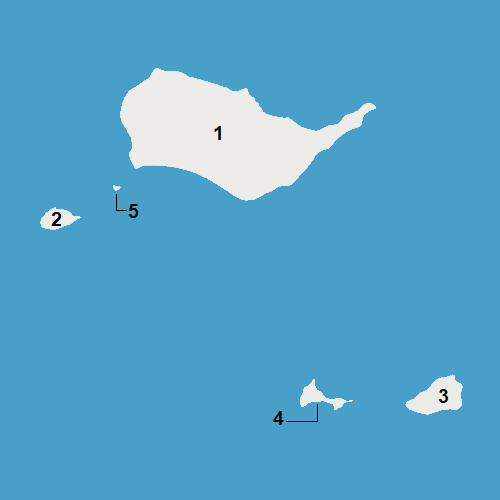
Karayer Adaları islands: 1-Tavşan, 2-Pırasa, 3-Yılan, 4-Orak, and 5-Sıçancık

Location of Aegean Sea islands in Çanakkale Province of Turkiye
Name	Province	Coordinates
Aksaz	Çanakkale	
Bozcaada (Tenedos in Greek)	Çanakkale	39°49′19″N 26°01′44″E
Gökçeada or Imbros	Çanakkale	40°09′39″N 25°50′40″E
Hedef Adası, Gulf of Saros	Çanakkale	40°36′57″N 26°44′16″E
Karayer Adaları	Çanakkale	39°55′46″N 26°04′13″E
Kaşık, Karayer	Çanakkale	
Küçükada, Gulf of Saros	Çanakkale	40°37′14″N 26°45′23″E
Minikada, Gulf of Saros	Çanakkale	40°37′14″N 26°45′52″E
Orak, Karayer	Çanakkale	39°55′07″N 26°04′25″E
Pırasa or Presa Adası (Note: Pırasa Adası is literally Leek Island), Karayer	Çanakkale	39°55′50″N 26°03′08″E
Sıçancık Adası, Karayer	Çanakkale	39°55′57″N 26°03′26″E
Taş Adası, Karayer	Çanakkale	39°49′37″N 26°04′44″E
Tavşan Adası (Note: Tavşan Adası is literally Rabbit Island), Karayer or Mavro Island	Çanakkale	39°56′07″N 26°04′02″E
Tavşanlı Island	Çanakkale	
Üçadalar	Çanakkale	
Yılan Adası, Karayer	Çanakkale	39°55′08″N 26°05′05″E
Yıldız Adası, Karayer	Çanakkale	39°50′58″N 25°59′37″E
Yıldız Adası	Çanakkale	39°50′58″N 25°59′37″E

==== İzmir Province ====
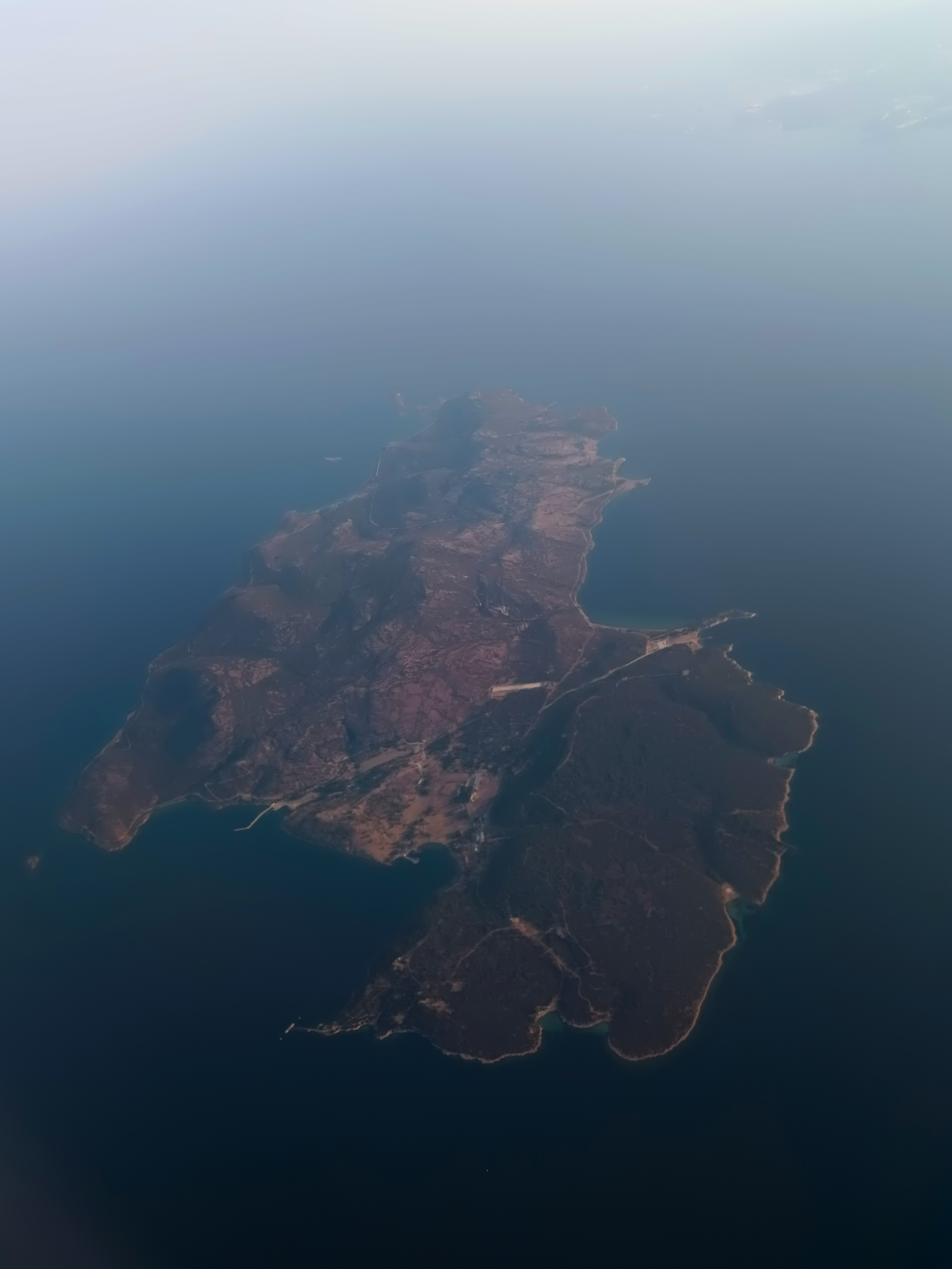
Uzunada

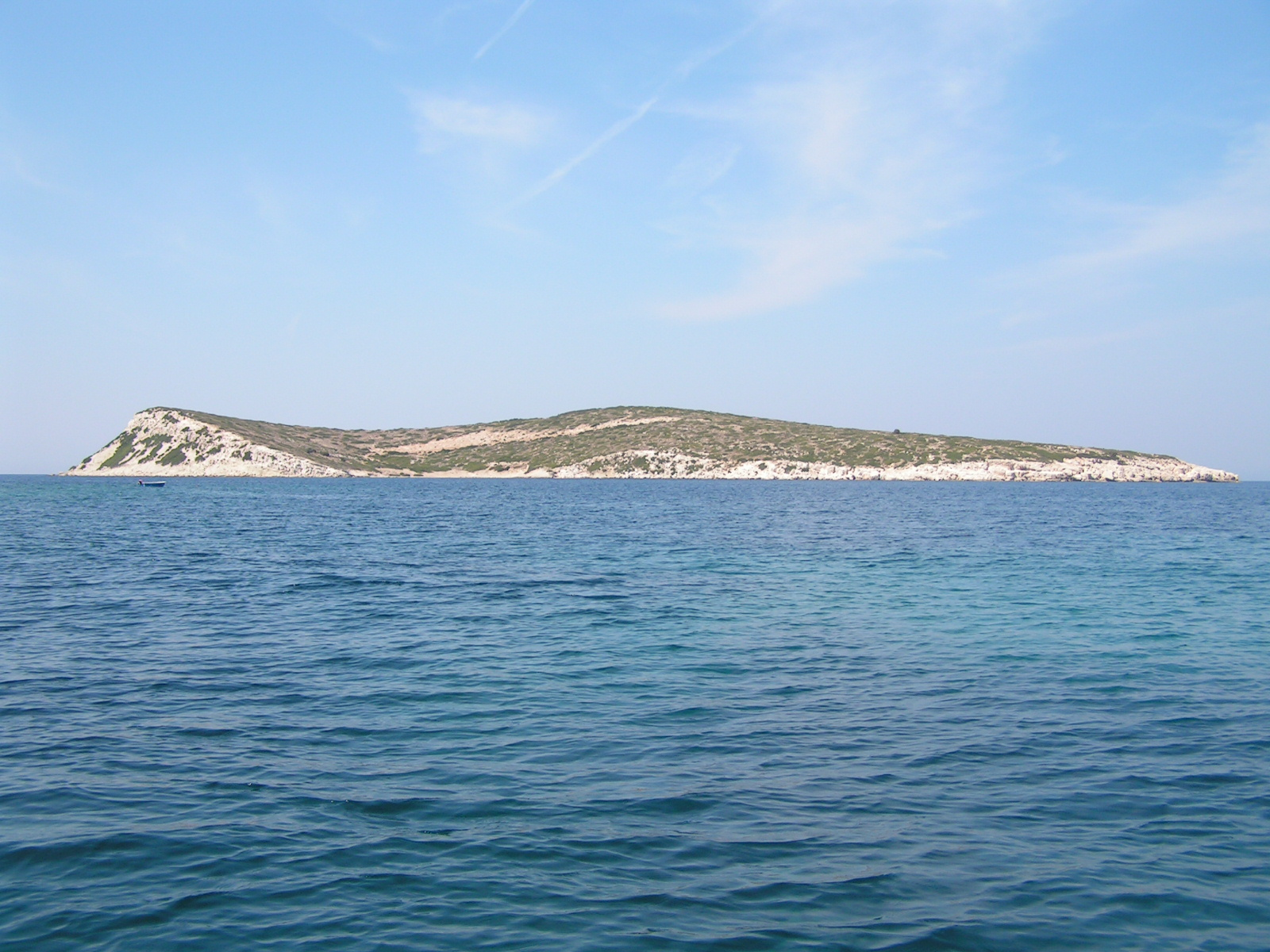
Büyük Ada

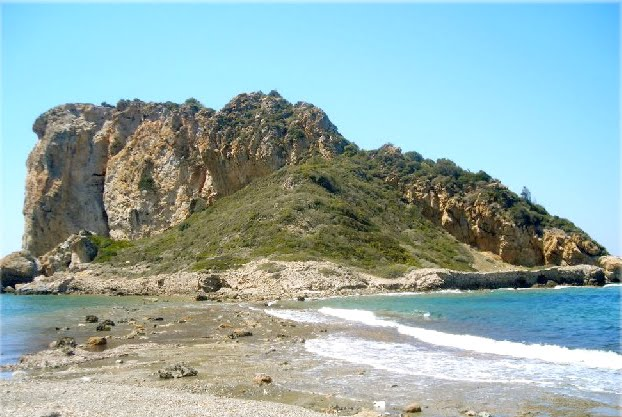
Çıfıtkalesi Islet

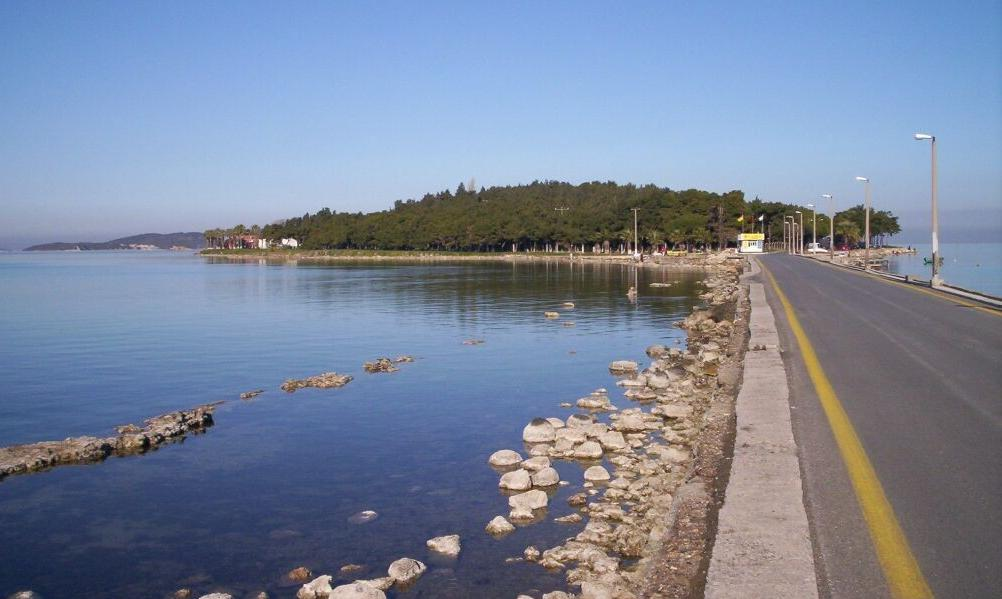
Karantina Island

Location of Aegean Sea island of İzmir Province of Turkiye
Name	Province	Coordinates
Akça	İzmir	38°23′56″N 26°46′44″E
Akkuş	İzmir	38°55′16″N 27°01′29″E
Bahadır Island (Vogel Island)	İzmir	38°07′31″N 26°49′51″E
Boğaz Adası	İzmir	38°17′39″N 26°12′35″E
Boş Ada (Hart Island)	İzmir	38°24′17″N 26°29′26″E
Bozburun Adaları	İzmir	38°52′51″N 27°02′14″E
Büyük Ada	İzmir	38°39′32″N 26°30′55″E
Böğürtlen Adası	İzmir	38°11′57″N 26°26′50″E
Çarufa Adası	İzmir	38°11′44″N 26°25′56″E
Çıfıtkalesi	İzmir	38°02′44″N 26°51′18″E
Çırakan Adası	İzmir	38°11′08″N 26°26′18″E
Çiçek Adası	İzmir	38°09′37″N 26°48′07″E
Çifte Adalar	İzmir	38°23′34″N 26°26′58″E
Çiğdem Adaları (Dayton Islands)	İzmir	38°11′24″N 26°28′36″E
Doğanbey Adası	İzmir	38°01′19″N 26°52′56″E
Eşek Adası	İzmir	38°11′56″N 26°46′13″E
Garip Island	İzmir	39°0′23″N 26°47′8″E
Gerence	İzmir	38°25′31″N 26°30′28″E
Hayırsız Island	İzmir	38°42′46″N 26°42′35″E
Hekim Island	İzmir	38°26′42″N 26°45′57″E
İkiz Adaları	İzmir	38°53′22″N 26°54′33″E
İkizkardeşler Adası	İzmir	38°56′03″N 26°48′23″E
İncir Ada	İzmir	38°40′24″N 26°43′39″E
İncirli Island	İzmir	38°24′30″N 26°46′14″E
Kalem Island	İzmir	39°0′12″N 26°47′42″E
Karaada, Çandarlı	İzmir	38°54′16″N 26°50′10″E
Karaada, Gerence	İzmir	38°26′25″N 26°20′44″E
Karabağ Adası (English Island)	İzmir	38°23′39″N 26°27′53″E
Karantina Island	İzmir	38°22′26″N 26°47′07″E
Karga Adası	İzmir	37°49′00″N 27°14′00″E
Kızkulesi Adası	İzmir	38°55′08″N 26°49′02″E
Kūçūk Ada, Gerence	İzmir	38°51′47″N 26°52′52″E
Küçük Ada, Çandarlı	İzmir	38°25′59″N 26°22′12″E
Metelik Island	İzmir	38°42′12″N 26°43′35″E
Mustafaçelebi Adası	İzmir	38°21′48″N 26°27′07″E
Pırasa Adası	İzmir	38°51′52″N 26°53′33″E
Pırnarlı	İzmir	38°23′51″N 26°47′12″E
Pide Island	İzmir	
Oğlak or Fener Adası	İzmir	38°40′34″N 26°42′53″E
Orak Adası	İzmir	38°41′32″N 26°42′58″E
Süngükaya Adası	İzmir	38°17′34″N 26°11′42″E
Tavşan Adası, Çandarlı	İzmir	38°51′03″N 26°52′57″E
Toprakada, Gerence	İzmir	
Toprakada, Uçburun (shoals)	İzmir	38°23′38″N 26°16′53″E
Ufak Ada	İzmir	38°23′27″N 26°25′43″E
Uzun Adalar (Note: Uzun Adalar is also known as Uzun Ada, Uzun Adalari, Uzun Adaları, Uzunadalar, Vrachonisides Makronisia, or Vrachonisídes Makronísia)	İzmir	38°25′07″N 26°18′36″E
Yassıada, Gerence	İzmir	38°22′37″N 26°27′55″E
Yassıca Island (Alman Adası/Halk Adası)	İzmir	38°24′39″N 26°47′37″E
Yılan Adası, Urla (Da Vinci Island)	İzmir	38°19′52″N 26°40′39″E

==== Muğla Province ====
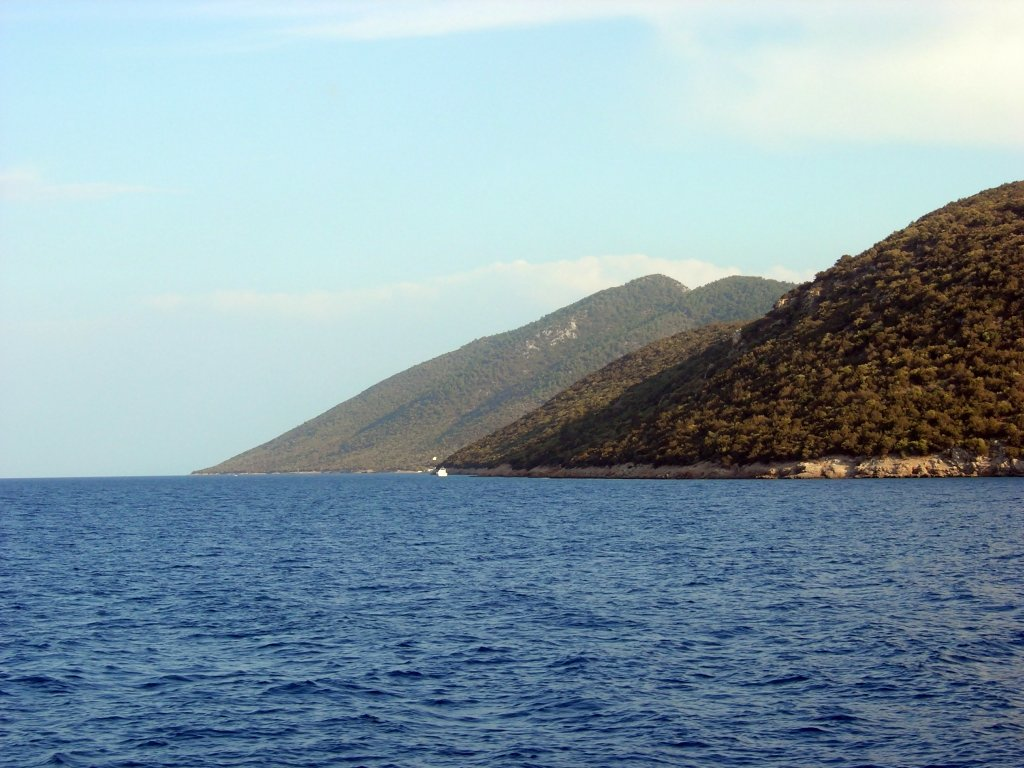
Kara Ada (Bodrum)

Location of Aegean Sea islands in Muğla Province of Turkiye
Name	Province	Coordinates
Akçalı Adası	Muğla	36°46′22″N 27°27′48″E
Alagün Adası	Muğla	37°16′34″N 27°30′36″E
Arap Adası	Muğla	36°39′5″N 28°8′48″E
Baba Adası	Muğla	36°41′37″N 28°41′40″E
Badem Island	Muğla	
Bedir Adası	Muğla	36°49′12″N 28°17′03″E
Boncuklu	Muğla	
Büyükkiremit Adası	Muğla	37°05′07″N 27°12′33″E
Çatal Adası of Marmaris	Muğla	37°00′32″N 27°13′18″E
Çavuş Adası	Muğla	37°02′54″N 27°12′08″E
Çelebi Island	Muğla	37°00′29″N 27°21′34″E
Değirmen Adası	Muğla	36°37′30″N 28°03′10″E
Delikada	Muğla	36°47′46″N 28°35′48″E
Deliktaş	Muğla	
Dişlice Adası	Muğla	36°45′42″N 28°02′09″E
Fener Adası	Muğla	37°10′30″N 27°21′23″E
Geçit Adası	Muğla	
Göcek Adası or Saint Kiriaki	Muğla	36°43′39″N 28°56′27″E
Görecek Adası	Muğla	36°59′46″N 27°23′04″E
Güllük İkiz Islands	Muğla	
Hasanhüseyin Adası	Muğla	36°48′26″N 28°03′22″E
İçada	Muğla	
Kameriye	Muğla	36°43′49″N 28°03′23″E
Kara Ada, Gökova	Muğla	36°58′33″N 27°27′36″E
Kara Ada (Bodrum)	Muğla	36°58′26″N 27°27′45″E
Karaca Adası	Muğla	36°57′39″N 28°11′46″E
Karga Adası	Muğla	36°48′28″N 28°15′28″E
Karga Adası	Muğla	37°07′58″N 27°15′24″E
Kargı	Muğla	36°57′5.4″N 27°18′18.87″E
Kargıcıkbükū Island (Çorak Island)	Muğla	
Katrancık Adası	Muğla	36°41′44″N 29°00′30″E
Keçi Adası	Muğla	36°48′22″N 28°15′14″E
Kızılada	Muğla	36°35′56″N 28°07′39″E
Kızılada, Marmaris	Muğla	37°07′42″N 27°17′52″E
Kızılada, Sömbeki	Muğla	
Kızılağaç Adası	Muğla	36°44′24″N 27°24′40″E
Kiseli	Muğla	
Kocaada	Muğla	
Küçūk Tüllüce Island	Muğla	
Küçük Tavşan Adası	Muğla	
Küçükkiremit Island	Muğla	
Metelik	Muğla	
Nar Island	Muğla	
Orak Island	Muğla	
Orata	Muğla	
Orhaniye Island	Muğla	
Palamütbükü Island	Muğla	
Peksimet Island	Muğla	
Pırasa Island, Güllūk	Muğla	
Pırasa Island, Turgutreis	Muğla	
Salih Ada	Muğla	37°9′12″N 27°30′50″E
Saplı Adası	Muğla	37°24′44″N 27°24′38″E
Sedir Island	Muğla	36°59′35″N 28°12′22″E
Sıçan Island, Turgutreis	Muğla	
Sōğüt Island	Muğla	
Suluca	Muğla	
Şehir Island	Muğla	36°59′43″N 28°12′23″E
Şövalye Island (Zeytin Island), Fethiye	Muğla	
Taşlıcaada	Muğla	
Tavşan Island, Fethiye	Muğla	
Tavşan Island, Hisarönü	Muğla	
Tavşanbükü	Muğla	
Topan Island, Marmaris	Muğla	36°42′32″N 27°59′51″E
Topan Island, Turgutreis	Muğla	37°00′20″N 27°10′52″E
Toprak Adası or Vardalkapı	Muğla	37°16′58″N 27°21′59″E
Turgutreis Çatal Island	Muğla	
Tüllüce	Muğla	
Uzunada, Hisarönü	Muğla	
Yassı Ada, Turgutreis	Muğla	36°45′11″N 27°45′49″E
Yassıca Islands	Muğla	
Yediadalar	Muğla	36°52′N 28°02′E
Yılan Island, Güllük	Muğla	
Yılancık	Muğla	
Yılanlıada	Muğla	
Zeytin Island, Sömbeki	Muğla	
Zeytinli Island, Fethiye	Muğla	
Zeytinli Island, Gökova	Muğla	
Ziraat Adası	Muğla	37°14′57″N 27°33′17″E

=== Black Sea islands ===
The following Turkish islands are in the Black Sea:

Island	Province	Coordinates
Amasra Tavşan Adası	Bartın	41°45′06″N 32°23′03″E
Büyükada (Amasra)	Bartın	41°45′10″N 32°22′59″E
Giresun Island	Giresun	40°55′44″N 38°26′10″E
Hoynat Islet	Ordu	41°07′03″N 37°43′43″E
Kefken Island	Kocaeli	41°12′58″N 30°15′40″E
Öreke	Istanbul	

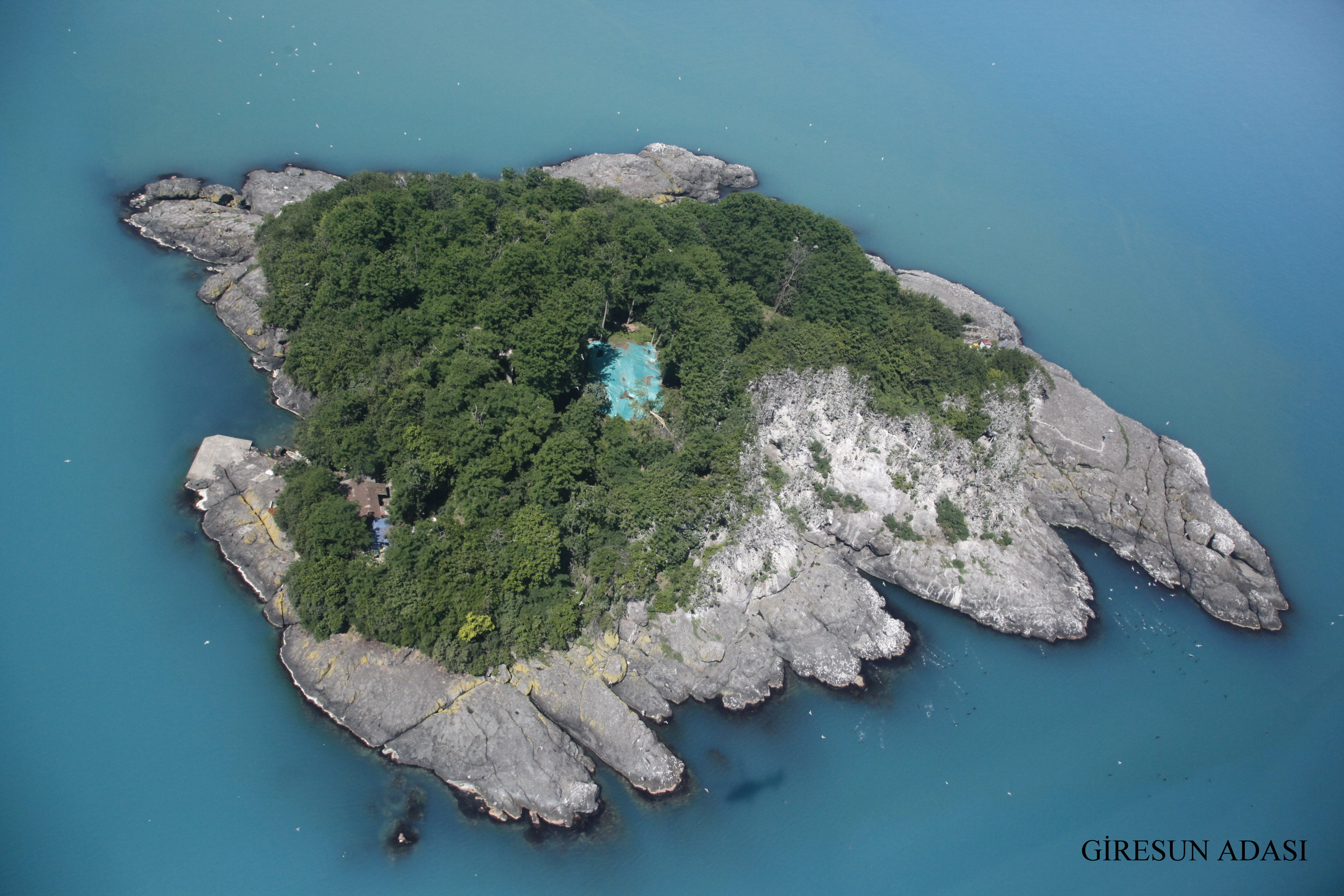
Giresun Island

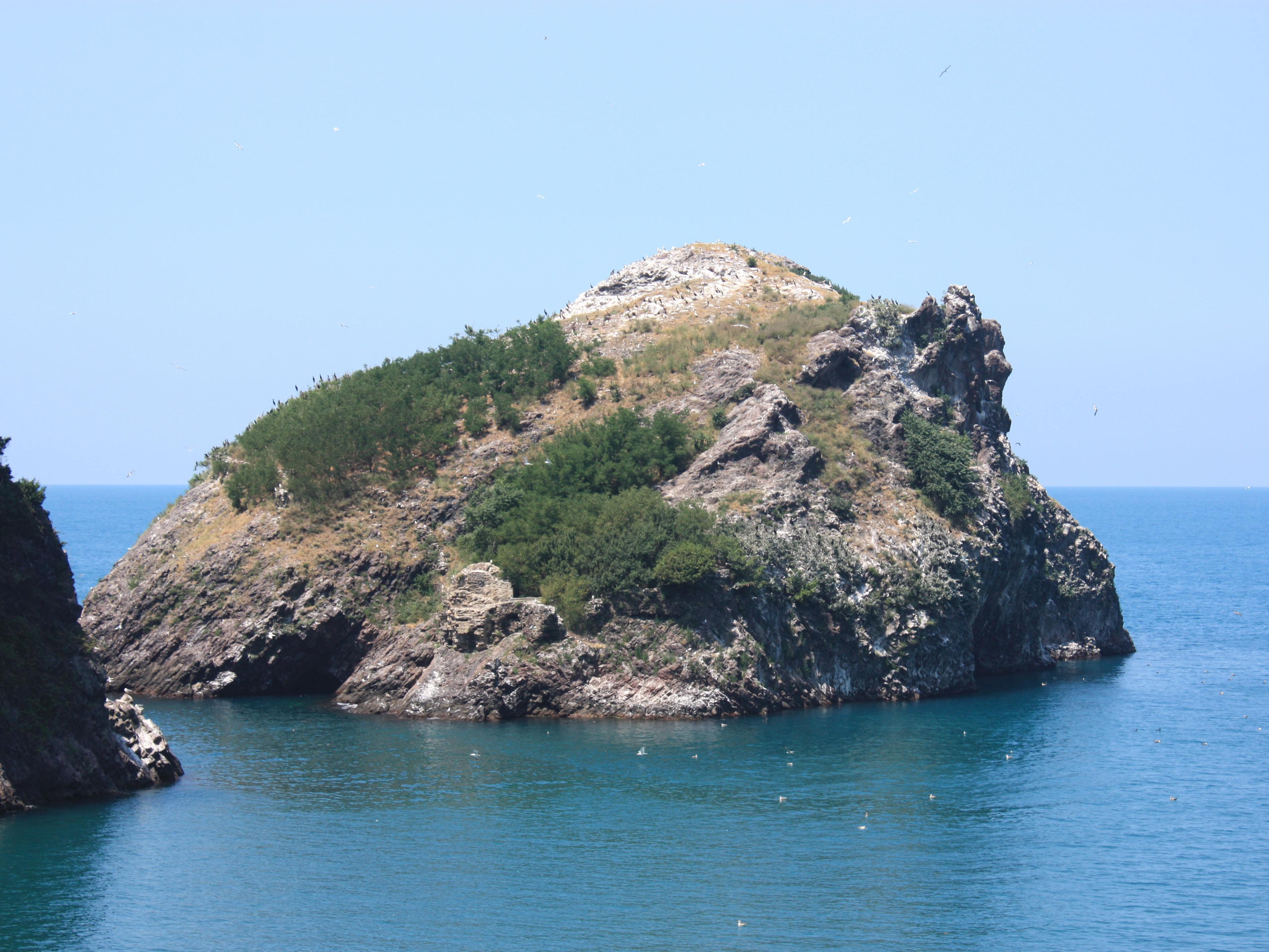
Hoynat Islet

=== Mediterranean Sea islands ===
The following islands are in the Mediterranean Sea:

Island	Province	Coordinates
Aşırlı	Antalya	36°12′38″N 29°54′04″E
Bayrak Adası	Antalya	36°09′32″N 29°37′18″E
Besmi Adası	Antalya	36°09′03″N 29°36′57″E
Ateş Island	Antalya	
Aydıncık Islands	Mersin	36°08′21″N 33°20′55″E
Babadıl Islands (Beşparmak)	Mersin	36°07′N 33°31′E
Başak Adası (Note: Başak Adası is literally Spike Island.)	Antalya	36°07′55″N 29°39′03″E
Beşadalar	Antalya	36°10′57″N 30°24′19″E
Boğsak Island	Mersin	36°16′02″N 33°49′36″E
Bozyazı Island	Mersin	36°05′45″N 32°58′33″E
Çam Island	Antalya	
Çatal Adalar	Antalya	36°13′02″N 29°21′27″E
Dana Adası	Mersin	36°11′N 33°46′E
Devecitaşı Ada part of Beşadalar group	Antalya	36°11′01″N 30°24′14″E
Domuz Island	Muğla	36°39′41″N 28°53′58″E
Gemiler Island (St. Nicholas Island)	Muğla	36°33′12″N 29°04′10″E
Gönül Island	Antalya	
Gūrmenli Island	Antalya	36°11′04″N 29°32′58″E
Gūrmenli Rocks	Antalya	36°10′10″N 29°33′24″E
Güvercinli Adası	Antalya	36°08′35″N 29°39′17″E
Heybeli Ada	Antalya	36°12′11″N 29°26′06″E
Heybeli Adası	Antalya	36°09′41″N 29°37′32″E
Kekova	Antalya	36°11′0″N 29°53′0″E
İç Ada	Antalya	36°07′24″N 29°44′36″E
Kara Ada	Antalya	36°10′14″N 29°49′57″E
Kara Ada, Kaş	Antalya	
Kara Ada, Kekova	Antalya	
Karataş Islets	Adana	36°33′N 35°23′E
Kızkalesi Island	Mersin	36°27′23″N 34°08′53″E
Kişneli Island	Antalya	36°12′13″N 29°54′01″E
Kolaytaşı Island	Antalya	
Kovan Island	Antalya	36°09′07″N 29°37′27″E
Kovanlı Island	Antalya	36°09′08″N 29°37′51″E
Kösrelik	Antalya	
Oniki Islands	Muğla	
Öksūz Island	Antalya	36°10′52″N 29°26′46″E
Pırasalı	Antalya	
Saplı Islet	Mersin	36°07′48″N 33°17′41″E
Sarı Ada	Antalya	36°08′00″N 29°39′32″E
Sarıbelen Island	Antalya	36°13′03″N 29°26′47″E
Sezgin Island	Antalya	36°11′17″N 29°54′26″E
Sıçan Islet	Antalya	36°48′09″N 30°35′20″E
Sıçan Island	Antalya	36°48′09″N 30°55′22″E
Suluada	Antalya	36°14′19″N 30°28′18″E
Şıldanlar Adaları	Antalya	36°11′55″N 30°24′07″E
Tek Ada (Macar Islands)	Antalya	36°11′24″N 29°54′42″E
Tersane Island	Muğla	36°40′14″N 28°55′09″E
Topak Adası	Antalya	36°10′09″N 29°50′12″E
Tuzla Island	Antalya	
Üç Islands	Antalya	36°27′18″N 30°32′51″E
Yassıca Adaları	Muğla	36°42′14″N 28°55′56″E
Yelkenli Island	Mersin	36°08′19″N 33°21′55″E
Yılan Island	Antalya	36°12′53″N 29°21′17″E
Yılanlı Island	Mersin	36°06′48″N 33°22′4″E
Yumurtalık Island	Adana	36°46′09″N 35°47′49″E

=== Sea of Marmara islands ===
Sea of Marmara

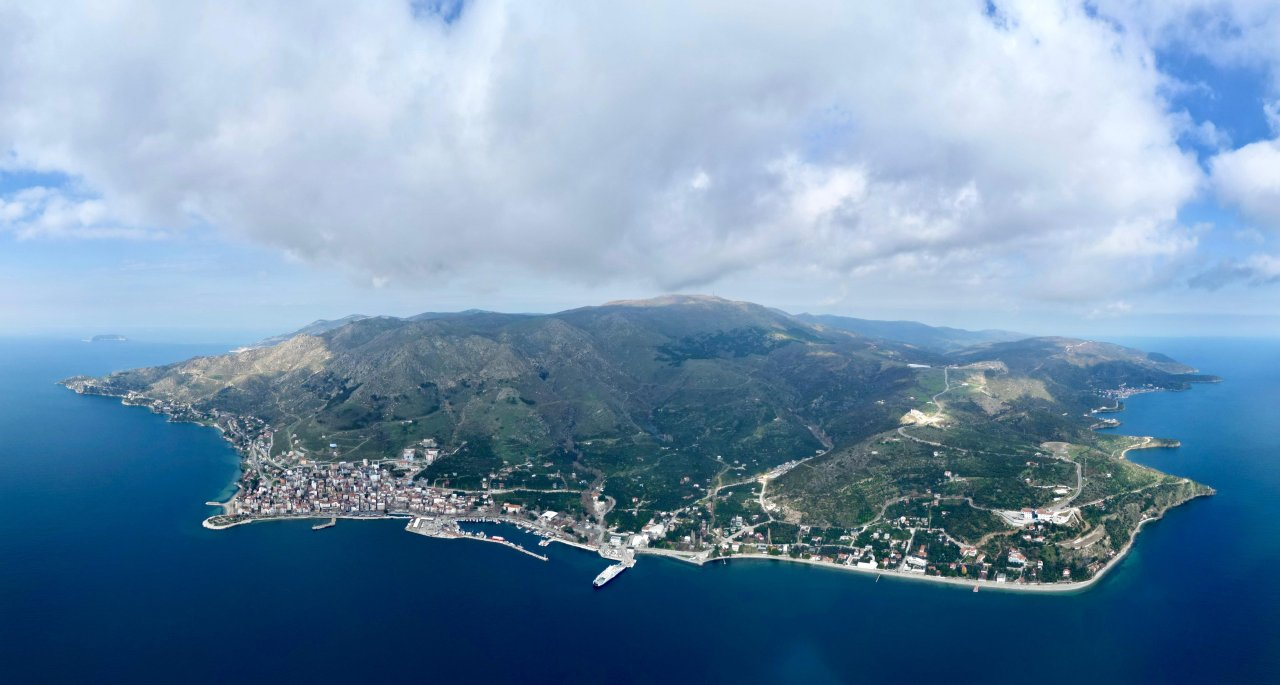
Marmara Island

The largest island in the Sea of Marmara is Marmara Island with an area of 117.8 km^{2} (45.5 sq mi). The following Turkish islands are in the Sea of Marmara:

Island	Province	Location
Akçaada	Balıkesir	40°31′30″N 27°42′33″E
Avşa Adası (Türkeli)	Balıkesir	40°30′24″N 27°30′41″E
Asmalı (Fener Adası)	Balıkesir	40°27′28″N 28°04′11″E
Burgaz Ada	Istanbul	40°52′48″N 29°03′42″E
Büyük Ada	Istanbul	40°51′28″N 29°07′12″E
Büyükada	Canakkale	40°27′08″N 27°07′19″E
Ekinlik	Balıkesir	40°32′56″N 27°29′06″E
Eşek Islands (Note: Esek Islands literally means Donkey Island)	Balıkesir	40°39′45″N 27°40′44″E
Fener Adası	Balıkesir	40°27′29″N 28°04′05″E
Hasır Island	Balıkesir	40°29′38″N 27°35′20″E
Halı Island	Balıkesir	40°27′08″N 28°05′22″E
Heybeliada	Istanbul	40°52′40″N 29°05′30″E
Hızır Reis Island	Balıkesir	
İmralı	Bursa	40°32′15″N 28°32′06″E
İncir Island	Istanbul	40°47′39″N 29°16′28″E
Kaşık Island	Istanbul	40°53′03″N 29°04′38″E
Kınalıada	Istanbul	40°54′32″N 29°02′56″E
Koyun Adası (Note: Koyun Adası literally means Sheep Island)	Balıkesir	40°30′33″N 27°34′40″E
Koç Island	Istanbul	
Kuş Island	Balıkesir	40°27′37″N 27°33′43″E
Kuruçeşme Island (Galatasaray Island)	Istanbul	41°03′35.06″N 29°2′22.48″E
Kumbaros	Istanbul	
Kūçükerdek Island	Balıkesir	
Marmara Island	Balıkesir	40°37′N 27°37′E
Mamalı or Mamelya	Balıkesir	40°31′33″N 27°35′02″E
Maiden's Tower (Leander Tower)	Istanbul	41°01′16″N 29°00′15″E
Paşalimanı	Balıkesir	40°29′22″N 27°36′32″E
Pide Island	Istanbul	40°53′04″N 29°04′38″E
Princes' Islands	Istanbul	40°52′N 29°06′E
Sedef Island	Istanbul	40°51′00″N 29°08′40″E
Sedef Island of Bandırma	Balıkesir	40°28′04″N 28°05′59″E
Şemsiye Island	Istanbul	40°48′05″N 29°15′26″E
Sivriada	Istanbul	40°53′N 28°58′E
Soğan Island	Balıkesir	40°29′50″N 27°35′14″E
Tavşan Adası (Note: Tavşan Adası literally means Rabbit Island)	Istanbul	40°49′10″N 29°06′45″E
Tavşan Ada, Balıkesir (Note: Tavşan Ada literally means Rabbit Island)	Balıkesir	40°22′32″N 27°47′10″E
Yassıada	Istanbul	40°51′52″N 28°59′36″E
Yer Island	Balıkesir	40°28′04″N 27°33′51″E
Yumurta Adası	Çanakkale	40°26′55″N 27°05′46″E
Zeytinli Island (Note: Zeytinli Island literally means Olive Island)	Balıkesir	40°23′39″N 27°47′17″E

=== Lake islands ===
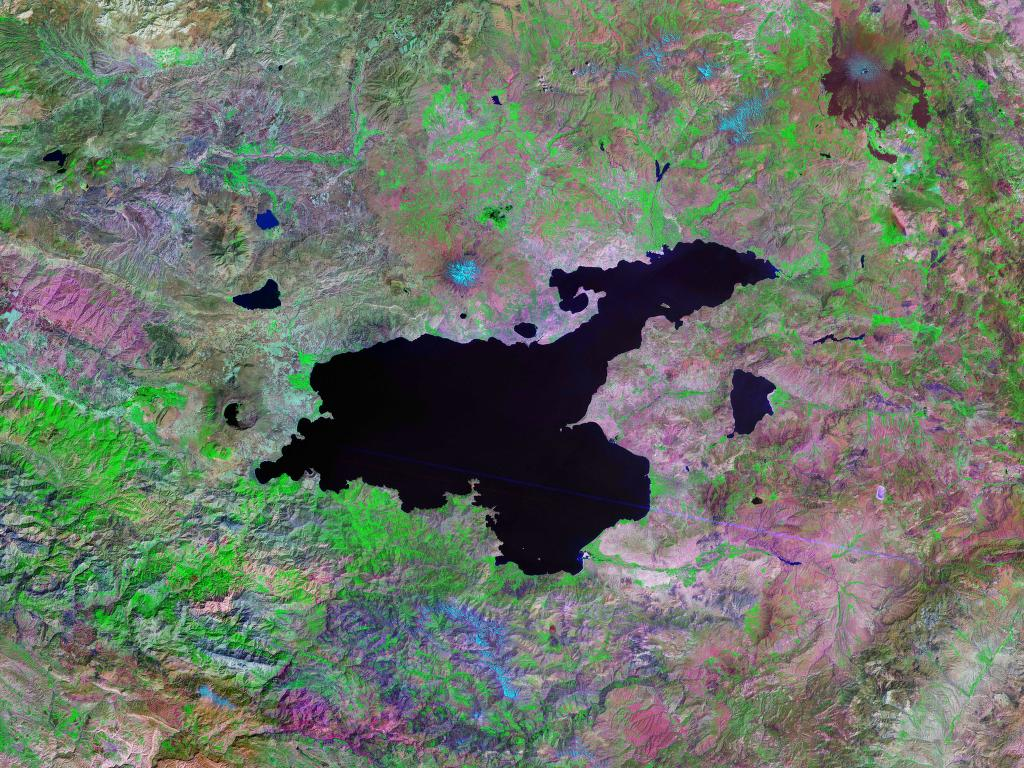
Lake Van

One Turkish lake, Lake Van, has islands, including the following:

Island Name	Province	Lake	Coordinates
Adır Island	Van	Lake Van	38°52′00″N 43°21′00″E (largest)
Akdamar Island	Van	Lake Van	38°20′30″N 43°02′07″E
Çarpanak Island	Van	Lake Van	38°36′24″N 43°05′08″E
Mada Island	Isparta	Lake Beyşehir	
Kuş Island (Note: In English, Kuş Island is Bird Island.)	Van	Lake Van	38°21′45.57″N 42°59′35.19″E

== See also ==
- Geography of Turkiye
- Gulfs of Turkiye
- List of Aegean Islands
- List of islands of Greece

== Notes or disputes ==
- See Imia (Greek) or Kardak (Turkish) and Aegean dispute for a discussion of disputed islands between Greece and Turkey.
