= Moron Hydor =

Port town of ancient Lycia

Coordinates: 36°17′59″N 30°27′53″E

Moron Hydor (Ancient Greek: Μωρὸν Ὕδωρ, meaning 'foolish waters') was a port town of ancient Lycia, located 30 stadia from Posidarisus, and 50 stadia from Cape Hieron and Chelidonia.

Its site is located near Gümrük in Asiatic Turkey.
