= Aydıncık Nature Park =

Protected area in Turkey

- Aydıncık Tabiat Parkı
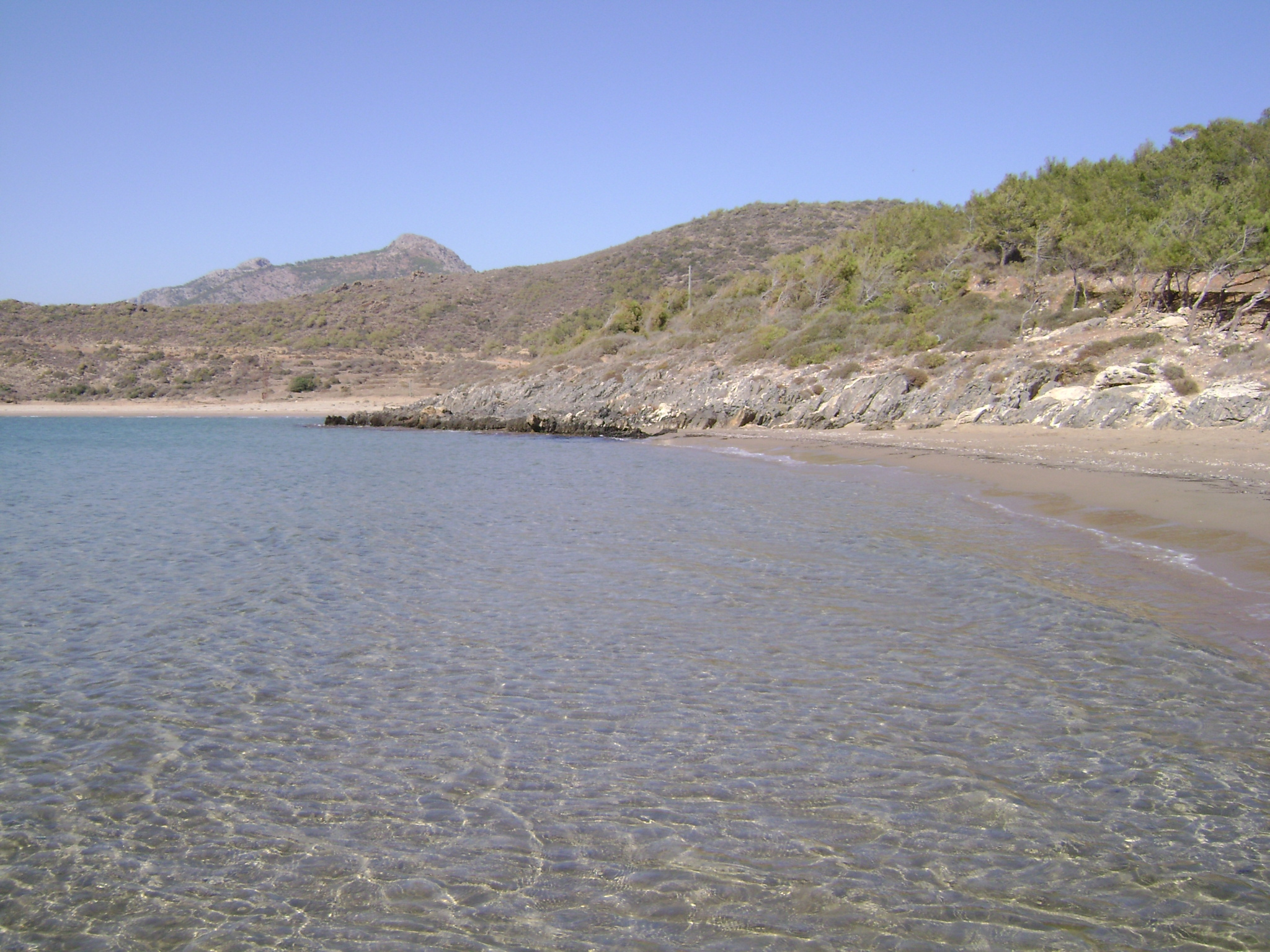
- İncekum beach in the nature park

- Location within Turkey
- Location: Aydıncık, Mersin Province, Turkey
- Coordinates: 36°08′52″N 33°21′38″E
- Area: 23.7 ha (59 acres)
- Established: 2011; 15 years ago
- Governing body: Directorate-General of Nature Protection and National Parks; Ministry of Environment and Forest

Aydıncık Nature Park is a nature park in Turkey. It is at 36°08′52″N 33°21′38″E and situated to the east of Aydıncık ilçe (district) of Mersin Province. Its distance to Aydıncık centrum is about 2 kilometres (1.2 mi) and to Mersin is about 170 kilometres (110 mi). Gilindire Cave is to the east of the nature park. It was declared a picnic area in 1988 and a nature park in 2011.

The park is at the east side of Aydıncık bay, facing Aydıncık Islands and the town. The total area of the park is 23.7 hectares (59 acres). The natural flora consists of Turkish pine (Pinus brutia), myrtle (myrtus communis), kermes oak (quercus coccifera) and laurel (laurus nobilis), and spini broom (calicotome villosa). Mediterranean gull (chthyaetus melanocephalus), Mediterranean monk seal (monachus monachus ) and various small reptiles make up the fauna around the park.
