= Foça Islands =

Island group in the Gulf of Izmir, Turkey

Coordinates: 38.6765°N 26.7154°E

Foça Islands is an island group in the Gulf of İzmir, Turkey, outside the town of Foça. There are six uninhabited islands, of which Incir Ada is visited most heavily by tourists. The islands of Orak, Hayırsız, and Kartdere have cliffs of up to 80 metres. Orak has a pebble beach along its southern shore.

The largest island is Orak. The island group also includes Fener Ada, Incir Ada and Metelik Island.

- Foça Islands
  - Azaplar Islets (Venedik Kayaları, Merminci, Vráchoi Mermígkia, Vrákhoi Mermíngia, Myrmikes, Myrmingia, Myrmikia, Myrminkies, Μυρμικες (Karıncalar), Μυρμίγγια, Μυρμηγκιά, Μυρμηκία, Μυρμηγκιές)
  - Fener Island (Oğlak, Middle, Elaiousa, Partheni, Ελαιούσα, Ογλάκ, Παρθένι)
  - Hayırsız Island (Atatürk Adası, Karteria, Χαϊρσίζ, Καρτερία)
  - İncir Island (Sağır, Sağırada, Sagir, Aya Yorgi, St George's, Hagios Georgios, Hagios Giorgios, Ágios Geórgios, Bakkheion, Bacchium, Bacchina, Bakchos, Bakatanisi, Bakchou Nesos, Vakcheion, Βακχείον, Αη Γιώργη, Άγιος Γεώργιος, Αγίου Γεωργίου, Άγιος Γεώργιος)
  - Kartdere Island (Güvercin)
  - Kedi Ferdi Islet (Kedi Ferdi'nin Adası, Cat Ferdi's Island, Sekiz (Eight))
  - Metelik Island (Piti Kayalığı, Pita, Pide, Πήτα)
  - Orak Island (Drepanon, Drepano, Drepani, Great Fokia, Rephia, Megalonisi, Alopeki, Μεγάλο Νησί, Αλωπεκή, Δρέπανον, Δρέπανο, Δρεπάνι)
    - Eşek Islet (Kalorrizitis, Καλορριζίτης)
