= Aydincik Lighthouse =

Lighthouse in the province of Mersin

- Location: Mersin Province, Turkey
- Coordinates: 36°07′48″N 33°23′49″E

Tower
- Construction: masonry
- Height: 12 m (39 ft)

Light
- Range: 5 nmi (9.3 km; 5.8 mi)

Aydıncık Lighthouse is a Mediterranean lighthouse in Mersin Province, Turkey.

The lighthouse is situated in a location known as Sancaktepe, 6 kilometres (3.7 mi) east of Aydıncık ilçe of Mersin Province at 36°07′48″N 33°23′49″E Aynalıgöl Cave is nearby.

The lighthouse is an unattended lighthouse. Its height is 12 metres (39 ft) with respect to the terrain. Its visibility is 5 nautical miles
