= Yelkenli Island =

Island in Turkey

Native name: Yelkenli Adası
- Location within Turkey

Geography
- Location: Mediterranean Sea
- Coordinates: 36°08′19″N 33°21′55″E

Administration
- Turkey
- İl (province): Mersin Province
- İlçe: Aydımcık

Yelkenli Island (Turkish: Yelkenli Ada, literally "sailboat Island) is a Mediterranean island in Turkey. It is administratively a part of Aydıncık ilçe (district) of Mersin Province at 36°08′19″N 33°21′55″E.

The uninhabited island has an area of only 650 square metres (7,000 sq ft). It is almost merged to the mainland (Anatolia) and close to the Aydıncık Cave a famous cave. Aydıncık Islands are about 1,400 metres (4,600 ft) to the west. Yelkenli Island is known as a breeding location of Mediterranean gull and Mediterranean monk seal.
