= Siderus (Lycia) =

Ancient Lycian port town

Coordinates: 36°21′56″N 30°30′09″E

Siderus (also known as Siderous; Ancient Greek: Σιδηροῦς) was a port town of ancient Lycia, referenced in the Periplus of Pseudo-Scylax and the Stadiasmus Maris Magni. The town is also noted by Stephanus of Byzantium under the name Sidarus or Sidarous (Σιδαροῦς). The place may also have borne the name Posidarisus or Posidarisous, mentioned in The Chronicon of Hippolytus as being 30 stadia from Crambousa and the same distance from Moron Hydor.

There was a promontory of the same name, which is identified by modern scholars as Adrasan Burnu in modern Turkey. 19th century writers William Martin Leake and William Smith equated the site of Siderus with that of Olympus. However, modern scholars place Siderus at Ceneviz Limanı.
