= Panayır =

Panayır can refer to the following places in Turkey:

- Panayır, Bigadiç
- Panayır Island
