= Sıçan Island =

Island in Turkey

Native name: Sıçan Adası
- Location within Turkey

Geography
- Location: Mediterranean Sea
- Coordinates: 36°13′18″N 29°22′15″E

Administration
- Turkey
- İl (province): Antalya Province
- İlçe: Kaş

Sıçan Island (Turkish: Sıçan Adası, also called fare Adası, literally "Mouse Island") is a Mediterranean island in Turkey. It is administratively a part of Kaş ilçe (district) of Antalya Province at 36°13′18″N 29°22′15″E.

In the past it was one of the Xenagorou islands (Ancient Greek: Ξεναγόρου νῆσοι).

The uninhabited island is a small circular island with an area of about 0.15 square kilometres (0.058 sq mi). The shortest distance to the main land (Anatolia) is about 1.5 kilometres (0.93 mi). Yılan Island, another island is to the south west of Sıçan Island. The island is ideal for underwater sports even for the beginners.
