= Üçadalar =

Group of three islands in Turkey

Native name: Üçadalar
- Location within Turkey

Geography
- Location: Mediterranean Sea
- Coordinates: 36°27′18″N 30°32′51″E

Administration
- Turkey
- İl (province): Antalya Province
- İlçe: Kemer

Üçadalar are three Mediterranean islets of Turkey. Üçadalar is a composite word meaning "three islands". The islands are part of the Kemer district of Antalya Province. They are situated to the west of the Gulf of Antalya. The two larger islands, each about 5 hectares (12 acres) in area, are on the southeast side of the group, and the smallest one is on the northwest. The coordinates of the southwestern island are 36°27′18″N 30°32′51″E. The nearest town on the mainland is Tekirova about 5 kilometres (3 mi) to northwest.
