= Incir Ada =

Island in Turkey

Coordinates: 38°40′24″N 26°43′39″E

Incir Ada (Turkish: İncir Ada, literally "fig island") is a Turkish island and a part of the Foça Islands group. It is a popular destination for recreation by locals and tourists

The islands and surrounding bays hold the only seal colonies in Turkey.

== See also ==
- List of islands of Turkey
