= Hayırsız Island =

Island in Turkey

Coordinates: 38°42′46″N 26°42′35″E

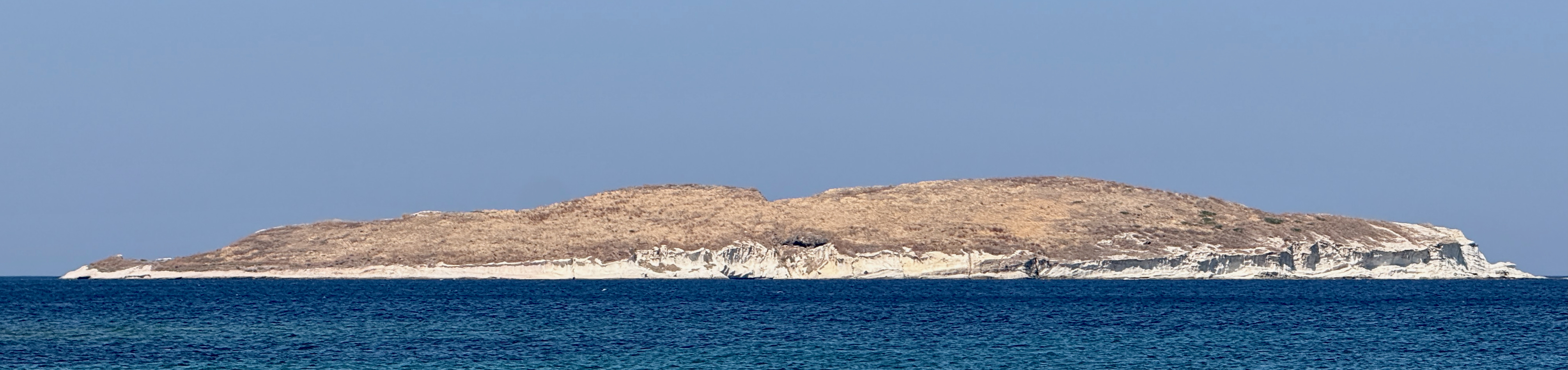
Hayırsız Island, seen from the coast, near Foça, Turkey

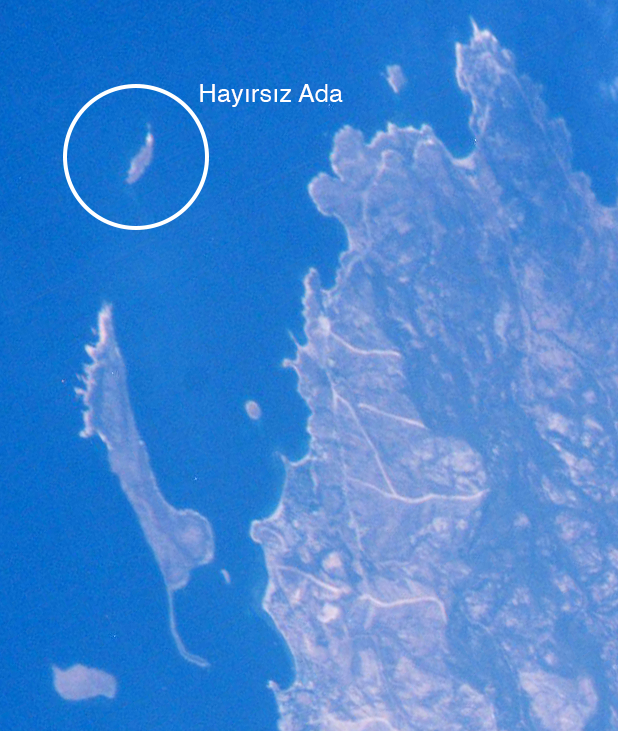
Hayırsız Ada as seen from the International Space Station

Hayırsız Ada, meaning 'good-for-nothing' or 'ungrateful' island) is a Turkish island. The island is locally referred to as Hayirsiz Ada ‘No Good Island’ because nothing grows on it It is part of the Foça Islands, and is one of six uninhabited islands in the group.

Other names for the island are Atatürk Adası, Karteria, Χαϊρσίζ, Καρτερία.

The island is also part of the Foça Special Environmental Protection Area.

== Renaming to Atatürk Island ==
In 2014, Foça’s then-mayor Gökhan Demirağ announced that the island would be officially known as Atatürk Island, due to the shape of its silhouette resembling Turkey's founder when viewed from the centre of the district.

In 2019 it was suggested that the island should have a Turkish flag placed on it.

== Disambiguation ==
It should not be confused with Sivriada also known as Hayırsızada, which is one of the Princes' Islands in the Sea of Marmara, near Istanbul.

== See also ==
- Foça Islands
- List of islands of Turkey
