= Sıçan Islet =

Island in Turkey

Native name: Sıçan Adası
- Location within Turkey

Geography
- Location: Mediterranean Sea
- Coordinates: 36°48′09″N 30°35′20″E

Administration
- Turkey
- İl (province): Antalya Province

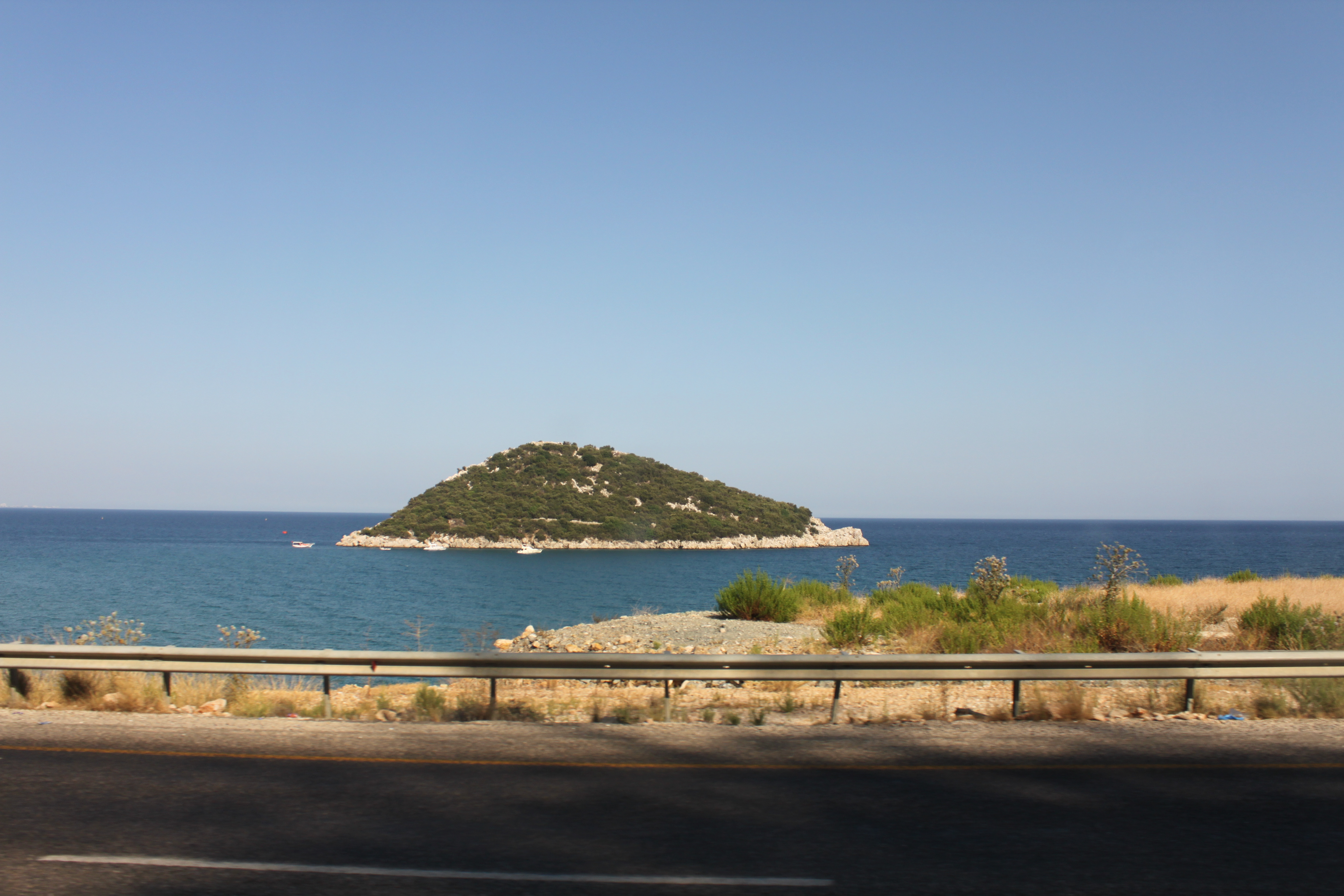
Sıçan Islet from the coast of Antalya

Sıçan Island (Turkish: Sıçan Adası) is an islet in the Gulf of Antalya. In the history the islet had a number of names.

The ancient name of the islet was Lyrnateia (Λυρνάτεια) or Lyrnatia (Λυρνατία). During the Roman Empire era it was called Attelebussa (grasshopper) . Italian seamen of the Medieval Ages used the name Renathia. Evliya Çelebi the famous Ottoman Empire traveler of the 17th century called the island Güvercin (dove) and Kuş (bird). In the 19th century its name was Rasat (observation)

The islet faces a small fishing port to the west of Antalya at 36°48′09″N 30°35′22″E. Its distance to the mainland (Anatolia) to north west is less than 100 metres (330 ft). Its surface area is about 0.04 kilometres (0.025 mi).There is a ramp from west to east of the islet and the east side is a high cliff. The uninhabited islet is attractive for the divers. The maximum depth in the sandy west coast is 8 metres (26 ft). But the depth in the east coast is 22 metres (72 ft). There is also an underwater cave in the east.
