= Yılanlı Island =

Island in Turkey

Native name: Yılanlı Ada
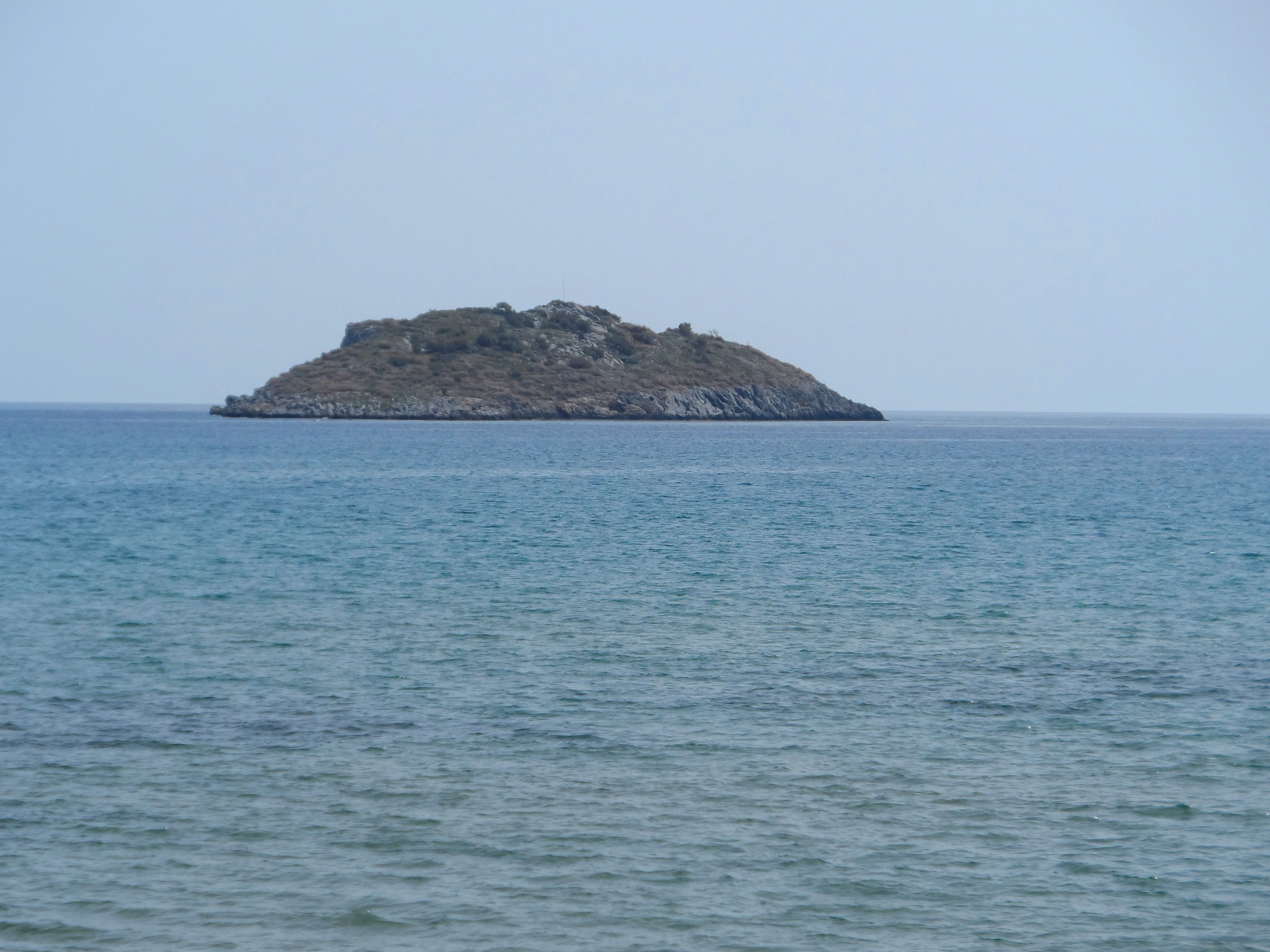

- Location within Turkey

Geography
- Location: Mediterranean Sea
- Coordinates: 36°06′48″N 33°22′4″E

Administration
- Turkey
- İl (province): Mersin Province
- İlçe: Aydıncık

Yılanlı Ada (literally "the island with snakes") is a small Mediterranean island in Turkey.

The island at 36°06′48″N 33°22′40″E is situated about 1.75 kilometres (1.09 mi) offshore (Sancak Burnu). The nearest coastal settlement is Aydıncık ilçe (district) center of Mersin Province about 6 kilometres (3.7 mi) northwest of the island. It is a narrow island lying west to east direction, approximately 180 metres (590 ft) long. The Aydıncık Islands are nearby.

The uninhabited island was known as "Spurie" during antiquity. The area around the island was declared an archaeological site (Turkish: SIT). During recent exploration many anchors were found around the island, indicating that it was a popular anchorage area from the Bronze Age. Also a wreck with amphorae LP1 type from the Roman Empire was found. Two amphorae, three stone anchors, a lead stock and its collar, and a stone stock were delivered to the Silifke Museum.
