= Yediadalar =

Group of islands in Turkey

Native name: Yediadalar
- Location within Turkey

Geography
- Location: Aegean Sea
- Coordinates: 36°52′N 28°02′E

Administration
- Turkey
- İl (province): Muğla Province
- İlçe: Marmaris

Yediadalar ("Seven Islands") is the name of a group of small islands of Turkey. They are Aegean islands in the Gökova bay. Administratevly, they are a part of Marmaris ilçe (district) of Muğla Province at 36°52′N 28°02′E. They are uninhabited.

Although they are called seven islands there are actually five small islands and two islets. The Göllü island is situated about 1 kilometre (0.62 mi) north of the others. The names of the other four islands which lie in parallel to coast line from north east to south west are; Küçük, Zeytinli, Uzun and Martılı . Each island is situated about 250 metres (820 ft) apart from the next one. The smallest island is Küçük ("little") as the name implies. Even the bigger islands are not bigger than 0.1 square kilometres (0.039 sq mi). Their distance to the coast is less than 1 kilometre (0.62 mi)

== Trivia ==
The eels around Yediadalar swim to The Bahamas for reproduction.
