= Saplı Islet =

Island in Turkey

Native name: Saplı Ada
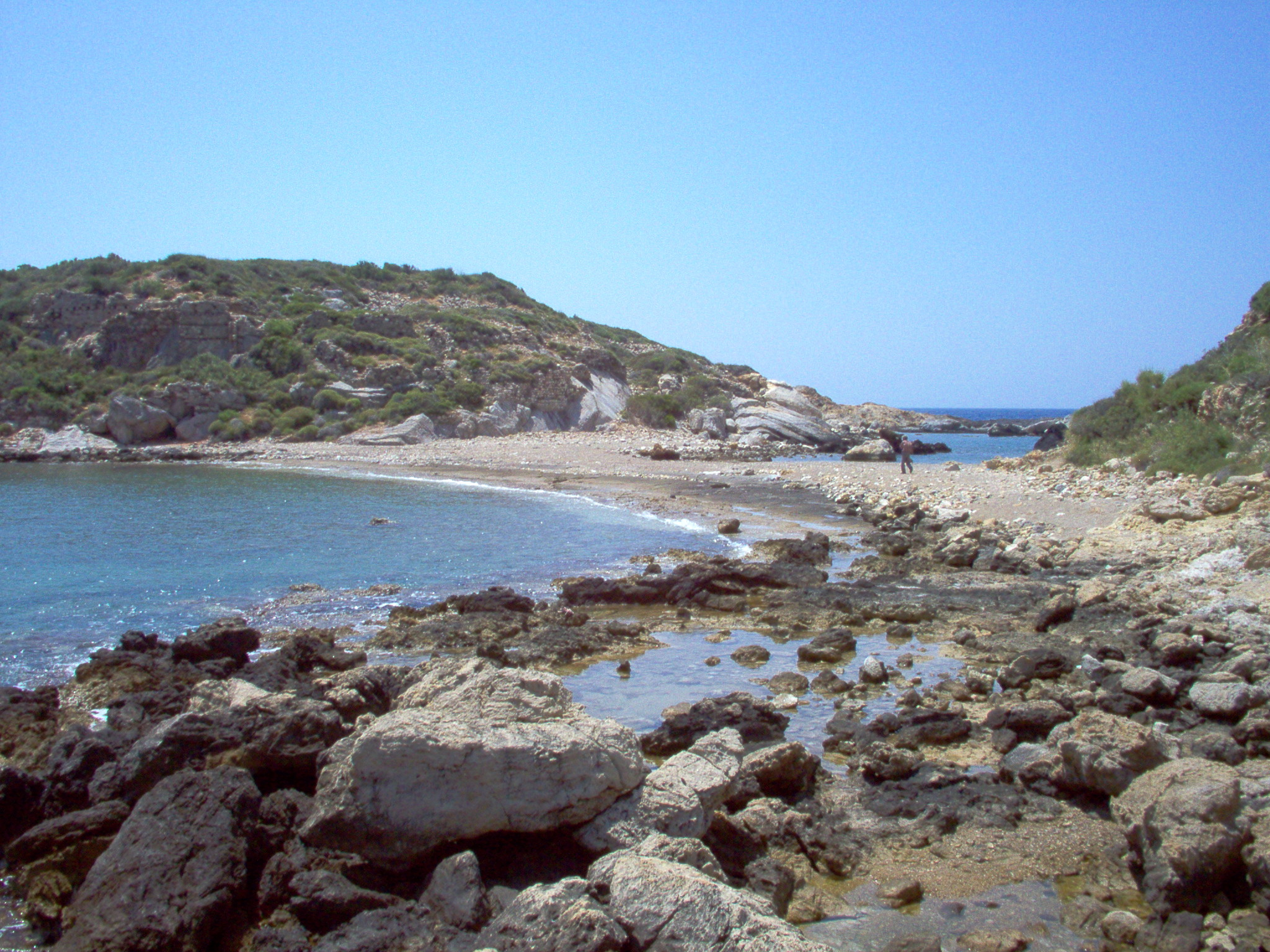
- Path between the mainland and the islet from the east

- Location within Turkey

Geography
- Location: Mediterranean Sea
- Coordinates: 36°07′48″N 33°17′41″E

Administration
- Turkey
- İl (province): Mersin Province
- İlçe: Aydıncık

Saplı Islet (Turkish: Saplı Ada, meaning "Island with a handle", also called Boynuince Islet) is a Mediterranean tombolo of Turkey. The island is at the Yenikaş coast which is located 4 kilometres (2.5 mi) west of Aydıncık ilçe (district) of Mersin Province. At 36°07′48″N 33°17′41″E it forms the west wall of the bay named Soğuksu. Its distance to Mersin is about 177 kilometres (110 mi)

The surface area of the tombolo is about 17×10^{3} square metres (1.8×10^{5} sq ft). It is connected to the main land by a short path. There are ruins of the antiquity on the islet. Although currently there is no archaeological excavation on the islet, it is included in SİT areas in Turkey.
