= Beşadalar =

Group of islands in Turkey

Coordinates: 36°10′57″N 30°24′19″E

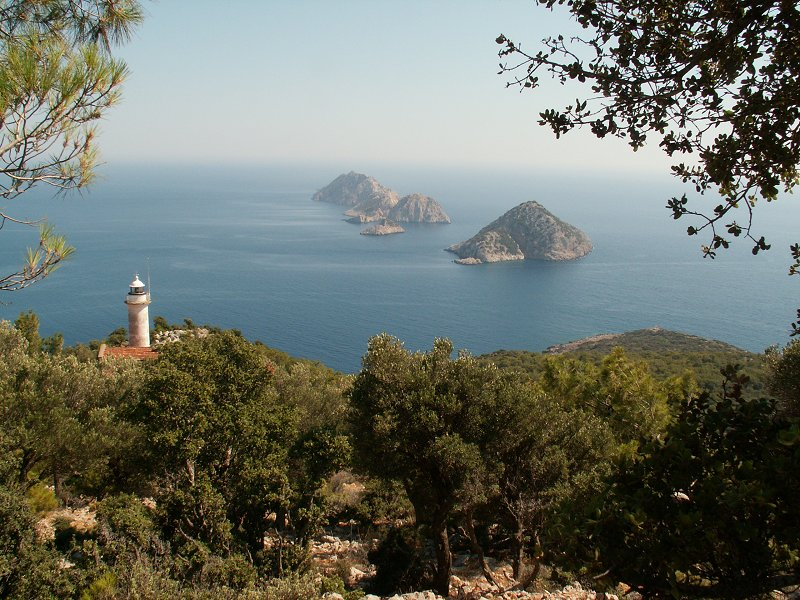
Cape Gelidonya with Beşadalar islands in the background

Beşadalar or Beş Adalar (Turkish meaning "five islands"; Ancient Greek: Χελιδόνιαι and Χελιδόνεαι, meaning "Swallow Islands"; Latin: Chelidoniae Insulae; Italian: Celidoni) is a group of islands off Cape Gelidonya on the south coast of Anatolia, Turkey. The largest island is named Devecitaşı Ada.

== History ==
Stephanus of Byzantium mentions two rocks, according to Phavorinus, one called Corudela, and the other Melanippeia; but the position is not mentioned. Scylax also mentions only two. According to Strabo, the Taurus Mountains first attains a great elevation opposite to the Chelidoniae, which are islands situated at the commencement of the sea-coast of Pamphylia, or on the borders of Lycia and Pamphylia. They were off the Hiera Acra (Cape Gelidonya), three in number, rugged, and of the same extent, distant about five stadia from one another, and six stadia from the coast; one of them having an anchorage or port. Dionysius Periegetes, mention three islands. Pliny, who places these islands opposite to the Tauri promontorium, mentions three, and observes that they are dangerous to navigators; but no dangers were discovered by Beaufort.

There are five islands off Cape Gelidonya: two of these islands are from four to five hundred feet high; the other three are small and barren.

The Italian name for the islands (Celidoni), derived from the Greek name Chelidoniae.

== List of Islands ==
- Beşadalar (Beş Adalar, Şıldanlar, Kutsal Kayalar, Gelidonya, Helidonya, Kırlangıç Adaları, Taşlıkburnu, Yardımcı Burnu, Chelidoniae Insulae, Chelidoniai, Celidoni, Chelidonia, Chelidonides nisoi, Χελιδονίδες νῆσοι, Χελιδόνιαι, Πέντε Νησιά)
  - Ateş Island (Poligon, Atış)
  - Devecitaşı Island (Melanippeia, Uzunada)
  - Meşe Island (Korydela, Corudela)
  - Suluada Island (Sulada, Sulu Ada, Krambusa, Krambousa, Crambusa, Grambúsa, Granbusa, Garabusa, Cambruxa, Ixola de Cambro, Karayoza, Karaboğaz, Dionysias, Κραμπούσα)
  - Topuk Taşı Islet

== Seals ==
The islands are a refuge for seals on the south coast of Turkey.
