= Toprak Island =

Uninhabited island in Turkey

Native name: Toprak Adası
- Location within Turkey

Geography
- Coordinates: 37°16′58″N 27°21′59″E

Administration
- Turkey
- İl (province): Muğla Province
- İlçe: Milas

Toprak Island (Turkish: Toprak Adası, literally "Soil Island") or Kapota island (Ancient Greek: Καπότα) is an Aegean island of Turkey. (It is sometimes called Vardalkapı Island) It is uninhabited.

At 37°16′58″N 27°21′59″E it is administratively a part of Milas ilçe (district) of Muğla Province. Its area is about 1 square kilometre (0.39 sq mi). Its distance from the mainland (Anatolia) is about 4.5 kilometres (2.8 mi).

Toprak Island is part of the archipelago of small Aegean islets off the coast of Muğla Province, lying north of the Bodrum peninsula and near the village of Çamlıca in the Milas district. Its coordinates place it within a region of numerous other uninhabited islands documented in geographic and map databases for the Aegean coast of Turkey.
