= Arap Islet =

Island in Turkey

Arap Island
Native name: Arap Adası
- Location within Turkey

Geography
- Location: Aegean Sea
- Coordinates: 36°39′5″N 28°8′48″E
- Area: 0.025 km^{2} (0.0097 sq mi)

Administration
- Turkey
- İl (province): Muğla Province
- İlçe: Marmaris

Arap Islet (Turkish: Arap Adası) is an uninhabited island of Turkey. According to Turkish Atlas it is situated on the borderline of Aegean Sea and the Mediterranean Sea. Administratively it is a part of Marmaris ilçe (district) of Muğla Province at 36°39′5″N 28°8′48″E. It is very close to the mainland (Anatolia). The channel between the mainland and the island is quite shallow; no more than 6 metres (20 ft). Its surface area is about 0.025 square kilometres (0.0097 sq mi).
