= Metelik Island =

Island in Turkey

Coordinates: 38°42′12″N 26°43′35″E

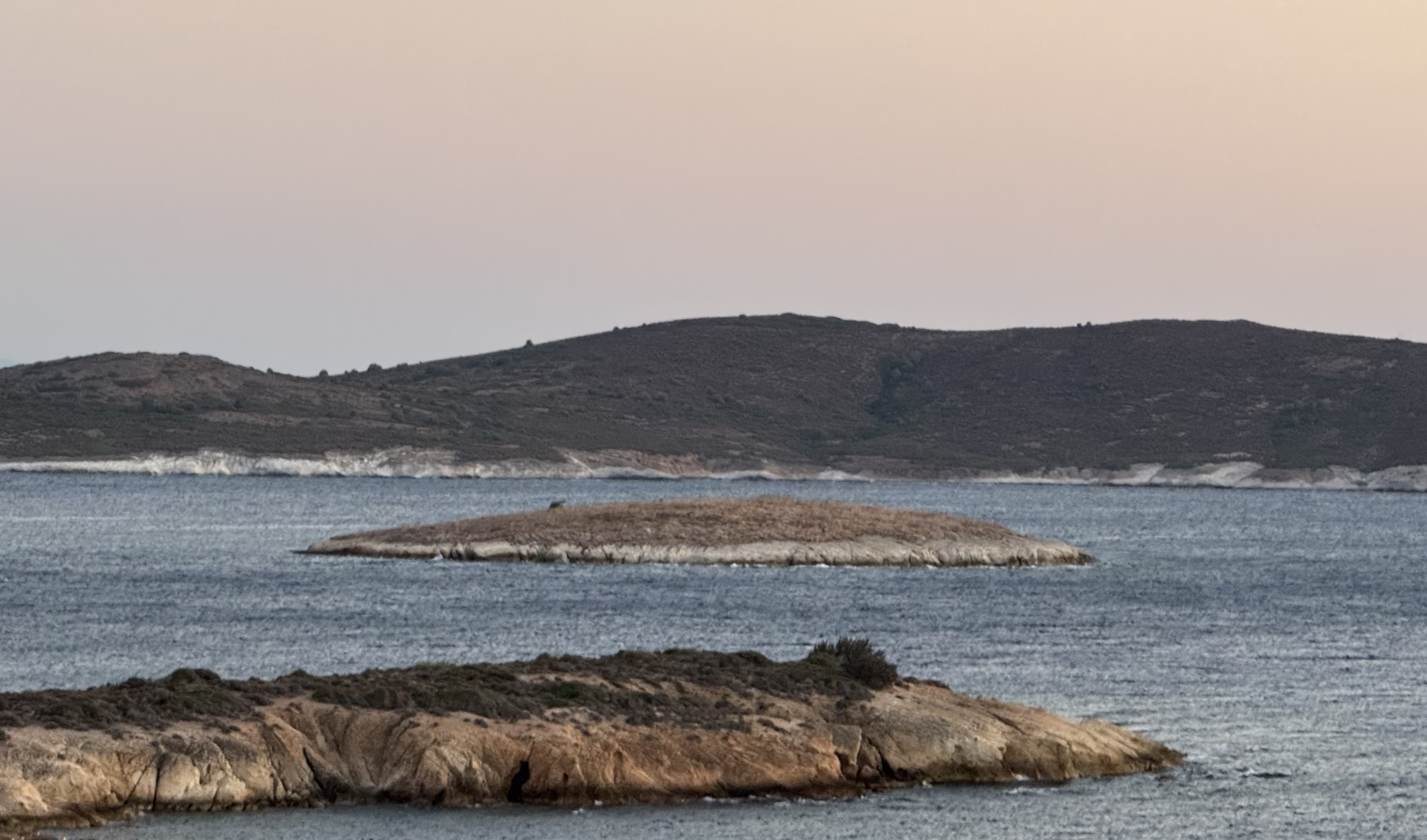
A photo of Metelik Island, Foça, Turkey, taken from the mainland

Metelik Island (Turkish: Metelik Adası) is an island in Turkey, about 300 meters off the coast of İsmetpaşa, Foça, in the Gulf of İzmir, in the Aegean Sea. Metelik Adası means "island of a low-value coin" or "small change island." It is a private island, previously owned by the Social Security Institution.

The island is part of the Foça Islands group. It has a surface area of about 1.5 hectares, a radius of about 150 meters, an elevation of about 1 meter, and a total shoreline of about 250 meters. The higher parts support vegetation, while the edges are bare rock.

The island is also part of the Foça Special Environmental Protection Area. Diving is forbidden around the island.

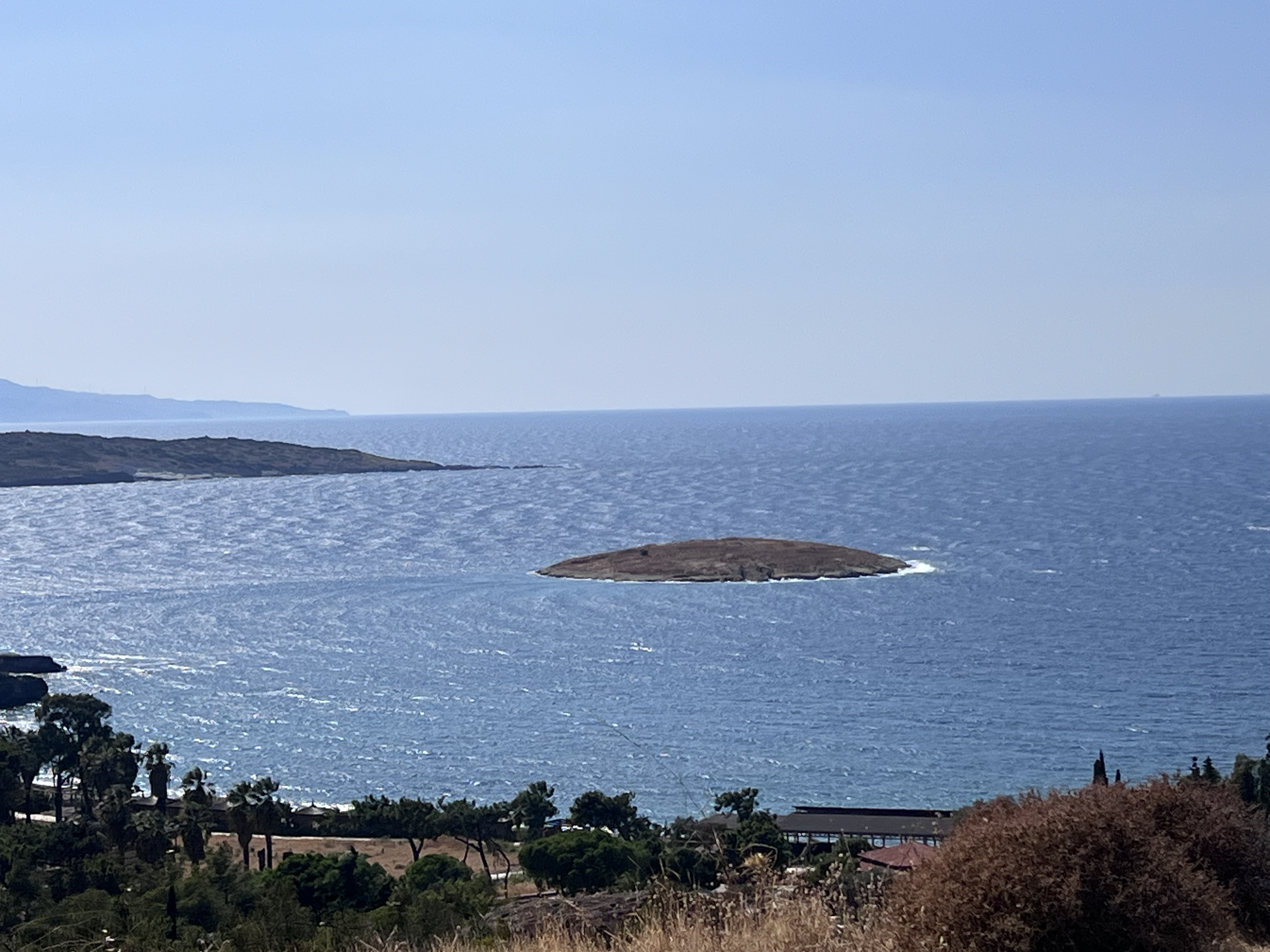
Photo of Metelik Island from the mainland
