= Fener Island =

Island in Turkey

Native name: Fener Adası
- Location within Turkey

Geography
- Location: Marmara
- Coordinates: 40°27′29″N 28°04′05″E

Administration
- Turkey
- İl (province): Balıkesir Province
- İlçe: Bandırma

Fener Island (literally "Lighthouse Island"), also known as Ayasandıras from its Greek name Agios Andreas (Άγιος Ανδρέας), is a Marmara island of Turkey. The island is to the east of Kapıdağ Peninsula at 40°27′29″N 28°04′05″E. Administratively it is a part of Bandırma ilçe (district) of Balıkesir Province. It is a long and narrow island in north west to south east direction. The length of the longer dimension is 1,200 metres (3,900 ft). There are some islets to the east of the island.
