= Suluada =

Island in Turkey

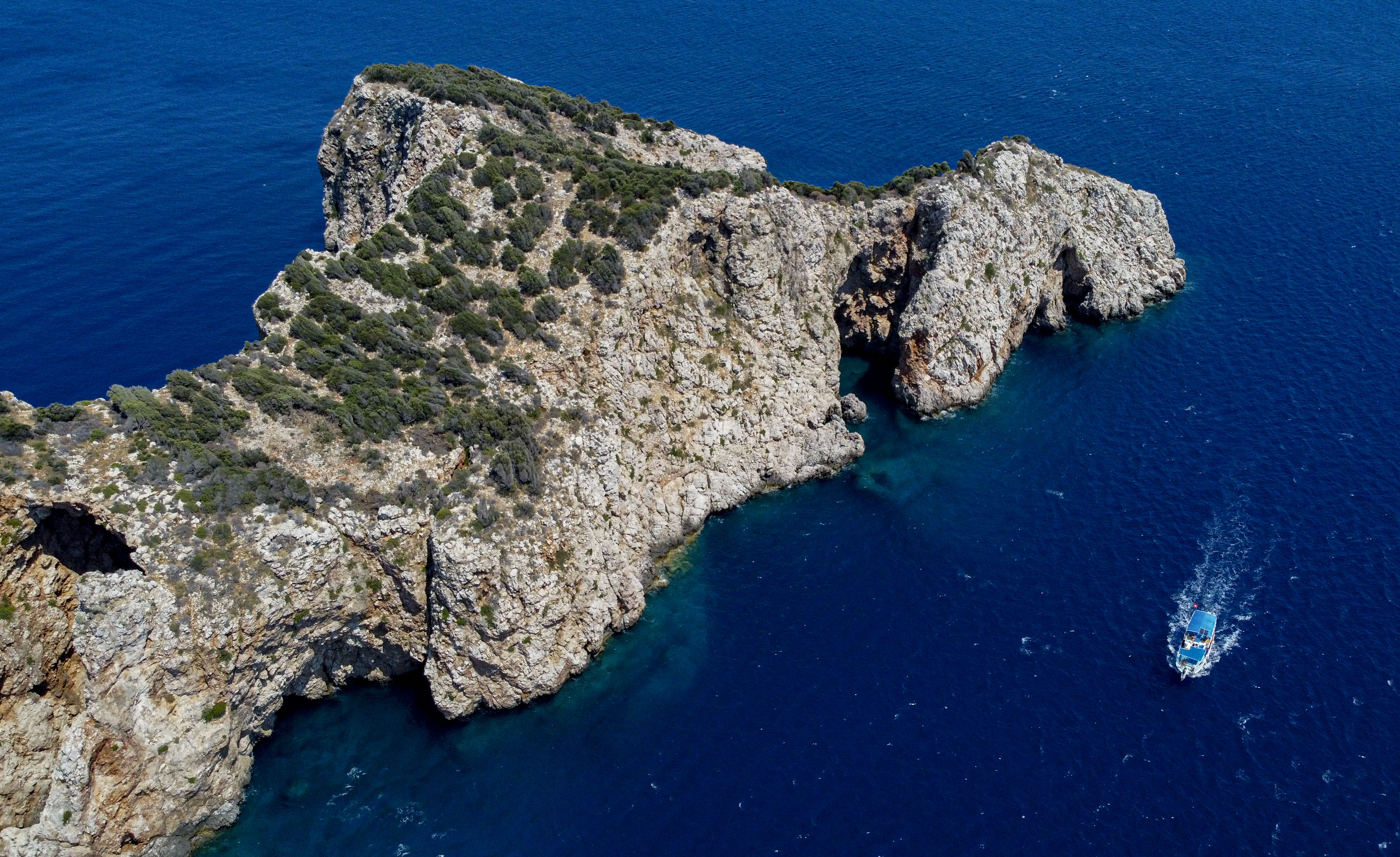
- Aerial view of Suluada

- Location within Turkey

Geography
- Location: Mediterranean Sea
- Coordinates: 36°14′19″N 30°28′18″E
- Area: 01 km^{2} (0.39 sq mi)

Administration
- Turkey
- İl (province): Antalya Province
- İlçe: Kumluca

Suluada is a Mediterranean island of Turkey. The name Suluada is a composite word meaning "watery island" referring to fresh water sources of the island. In the antiquity the island was called "Krambusa".

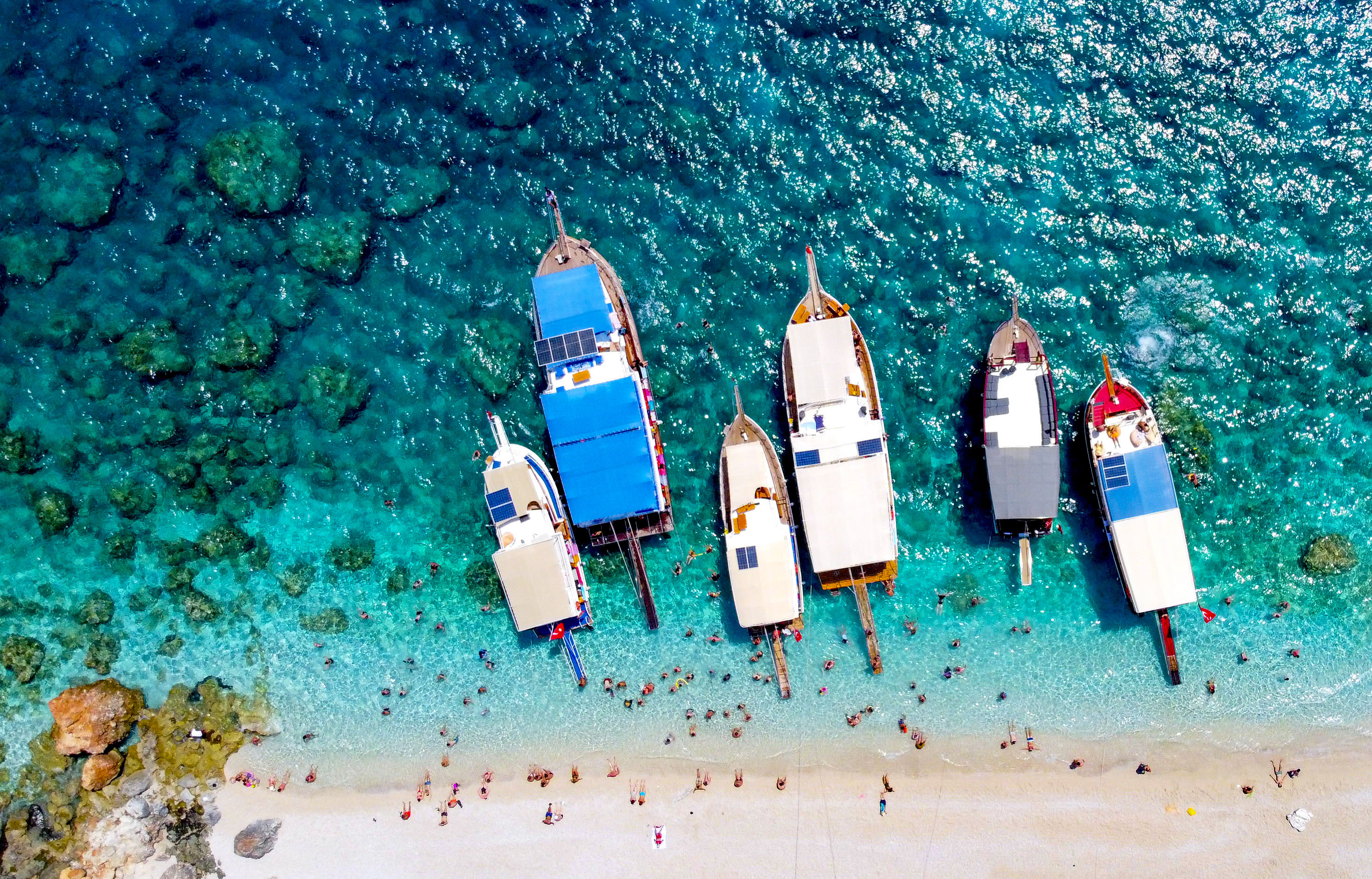
Aerial view of the boats in Suluada

The uninhabited island is situated in the westernmost end of Gulf of Antalya about 7 kilometres (4.3 mi) to the Cape Gelidonya. Administratively, it is a part of Kumluca ilçe (district) of Antalya Province at 36°14′19″N 30°28′18″E The island is long and narrow where the 1,200 metres (3,900 ft)-long dimension points to northwest.

Suluada is located approximately 7 to 8 kilometres (4.3 to 5.0 mi) from Adrasan beach in the Kumluca district of Antalya Province. The island has no road access and can only be reached by boat. It is a protected area where accommodation and camping are not permitted.

Daily excursions to Suluada from Antalya coast are being organized everyday between April and November. Island is also known as Turkish Maldives.

== Geography ==
The island's name, meaning "Water Island" in Turkish, derives from a natural freshwater spring located on the island. Despite being several kilometres from the mainland, this spring provided fresh water to seafarers and made the island a notable landmark throughout history.

The Adrasan coastline near the island has served as an active maritime route since the Lycian era. In ancient times, fires and signal lights were maintained in the area to guide passing vessels. A lighthouse built near the island remains standing today at what is locally known as Lighthouse Bay.

== History ==
In antiquity, the island was known as Krambusa. During the Cold War period (1960s–1970s), United States Navy vessels anchored in a bay approximately 2 nautical miles (3.7 km) from Adrasan beach, where crew members would rest and swim. This bay has since become known locally as "American Bay" (Turkish: Amerikan Koyu).

== Flora and Fauna ==
The cave formations along the southern coast of Suluada are a known habitat of the Mediterranean monk seal (Monachus monachus), a critically endangered species. Due to strong sea currents in this area, swimming near the caves is not permitted. Conservation efforts are in place to protect the local seal population.
