= Cape Gelidonya =

Cape located at the south of Turkey

Coordinates: 36°11′36″N 30°24′11″E

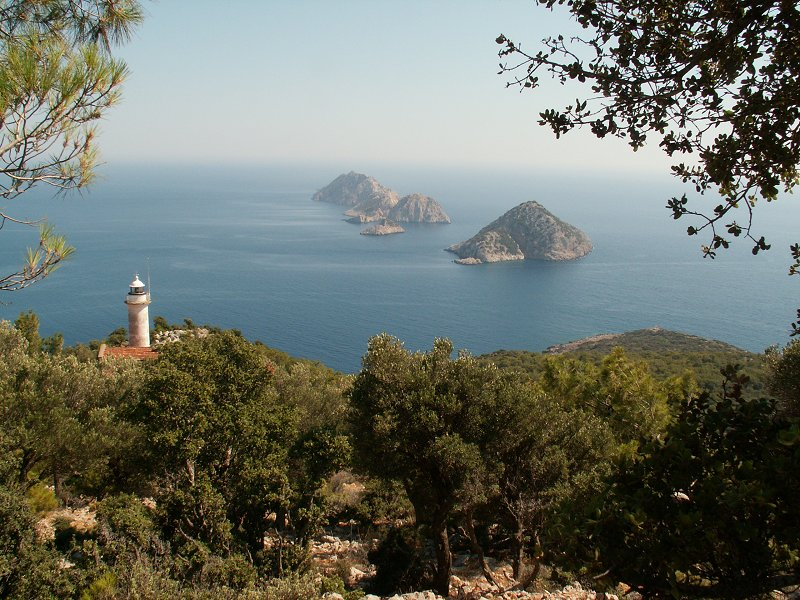
Gelidonya Lighthouse

Cape Gelidonya (Turkish: Gelidonya Burnu or Taşlık Burnu, from Greek: Χελιδωνία, Chelidonia; Latin: Chelidonium promontorium), formerly Kilidonia or Killidonia is a cape or headland on the Teke Peninsula in the chain of Taurus Mountains, located on the southern coast of Anatolia between the Gulf of Antalya and the Bay of Finike.

During the classical Greek and Hellenistic eras, it was called Chelidonia (meaning swallows), and a group of five small islands, as Chelidoniai nesoi (Swallow Islands, now Beşadalar Adasi). In Roman times, it was known as Promontorium Sacrum (Latin for "Holy Promontory"), and the group of islands as Chelidoniae Insulae.

== Bronze Age shipwreck ==
The cape is the site of a late Bronze Age shipwreck (c. 1200 BC). In view of the cargo's nature and composition the findings are of a Mycenean Greek provenance. The remains of the ship sat at a depth of about 27 metres (89 ft), on irregular rocky bottom. It was located in 1954, and the excavation began in 1960 by Peter Throckmorton, George F. Bass, Joan du Plat Taylor and Frédéric Dumas. Among the finds were Mycenaean pottery, scrape copper, copper and tin ingots, and merchant weights.

=== Discovery and excavation ===
The eccentric photojournalist Peter Throckmorton, out of New York, arrived there in the mid-1950s after a controversial campaign where he was profiling the Algerian War from the point of view of the Algerian rebels fighting against French troops, which would later lead to an alleged altercation between himself and another team member, Claude Duthuit, who was fighting with the French. Throckmorton arrived in the small city of Bodrum in the southwest of Turkey, built on the ancient city of Halicarnassus, where the remnants of one of the ancient wonders of the world, the Mausoleum at Halicarnassus, can still be seen today. He had received word that a bronze statue of the Greek goddess Demeter was pulled up by fishing nets and left on the beach, but by the time he had arrived the statue was taken and would eventually find a home in the Museum of İzmir, north of Bodrum.

Throckmorton came to know Captain Kemal of the Mandlinci, a sponge fishing boat. The captain told Throckmorton that he knew of many ancient sites that were lying on the seabed, one of which he planned to dynamite the following year. Throckmorton urged him to preserve the site and convinced the Captain to draw a map, allegedly on the back of a napkin. He would return in 1958 under the flag of the Explorers' Club, with filmmaker Stan Waterman among others, including Honor Frost. They set out to visit a number of underwater archaeological sites and finally arrived at Cape Gelidonya, where they spent most of their time trying to identify the site. Finally, on the last day, they located the site on one of the small islands off the Cape.

Throckmorton convinced the University of Pennsylvania Museum of Archaeology and Anthropology to sponsor an excavation of the site, while Frost convinced Joan du Plat Taylor to be a co-director with whoever Throckmorton found. At this time, the young archaeologist George Bass was working on his PhD at the university and was sent to co-direct the archaeological excavation of the site. Neither co-director had completed a diving qualification before they arrived but Bass had some practice in a YMCA pool and knew how to swim. He was also much younger than Taylor, who was well-known and respected within the archaeological community. The group of divers arrived in 1960 and began to complete the first archaeological excavation of an underwater shipwreck in its entirety, though divers still find missed artefacts on occasion. The British side of the expedition is generally written out of history because most of the funding came from America.

This was the oldest known shipwreck at the time, only being surpassed by the discovery of the Uluburun shipwreck in the early 1980s. This was one of the first projects that led to the development of the field of nautical archaeology, along with the excavation of the Viking Skuldelev ships at Roskilde in 1962, and the discovery and raising of the Swedish warship the Vasa in 1961.

== See also ==
- Uluburun shipwreck
- List of shipwrecks
