= Görecek Island =

Island in Turkey

Native name: Görecek Adası
- Location within Turkey

Geography
- Location: Aegean Sea
- Coordinates: 36°59′45″N 27°23′02″E
- Area: 0.75 km^{2} (0.29 sq mi)
- Length: 1 km (0.6 mi)

Administration
- Turkey
- İl (province): Muğla Province
- İlçe: Bodrum

Görecek Island is an Aegean island of Turkey. The island is a part of Bodrum ilçe (district) of Muğla Province. It is more or less a rectangular island where the longest dimension (north to south is over 1 kilometre (0.62 mi). Its area is 750,000 square metres (8,100,000 sq ft). It is quite close to the mainland (Anatolia) . The nearest point on the mainland is as close as 250 metres (820 ft). The uninhabited island is a private property.
