= Panayır Island =

Island in Turkey

Native name: Pamnayır Adası
- Location within Turkey

Geography
- Location: Aegean Sea
- Coordinates: 37°19′36″N 27°19′50″E
- Area: 0.1 km^{2} (0.039 sq mi)

Administration
- Turkey
- İl (province): Aydın Province
- İlçe: Didim

Panayır Island (Turkish: Panayır Adası), deriving from its Greek name Panagia (Greek: Παναγία), is an Aegean island of Turkey. It was once known as Ziraat Island ("Agriculture Island"). It is now also known as Altın Adası ("Gold Island"). The island is a part of Didim ilçe (district) of Aydın Province at 37°19′36″N 27°19′50″E The area of the island is about 0.4 square kilometres (0.15 sq mi). Its distance to main land (Altınkum beach of Didim in Anatolia) is 1.4 kilometres (0.87 mi).

Currently the island is uninhabited. But there is an abandoned church, a building of the Ministry of Agriculture and a lighthouse in the island. The island was used to be officially recognized as a SIT area (archaeological site). But in 2010, Ministry of Environment and Urban Planning ended its SIT status. Now there is an intense discussion on the future of the island
