= Orak Island (İzmir) =

Island in Turkey

Native name: Orak Adası
- Location within Turkey

Geography
- Coordinates: 38°41′32″N 26°42′58″E

Administration
- Turkey
- İl (province): İzmir Province
- İlçe: Foça

Orak Island is an Aegean island in Turkey

The island faces Foça (Phokaia of the antiquity) in the gulf of İzmir at 38°41′31″N 26°52′57″E. Its distance to coast is about 400 metres (1,300 ft). The longer (north to south) dimension of the island is 2 kilometres (1.2 mi). The name of the island orak ("sickle") refers to spit to the south of the island. It has been speculated that the ancient name of the island might be "Bakkheion". According to surface survey of Professor Ömer Özyiğit, the island was inhabited during the classical age up to Late Roman Empire era. There were three stone pits. One of them was probably a cult center of the goddess Cybele.
