= Yılan Island =

Island in Turkey

Yilan Island
Native name: Yilan Adası
- Location within Turkey

Geography
- Location: Mediterranean Sea
- Coordinates: 36°12′53″N 29°21′17″E

Administration
- Turkey
- İl (province): Antalya Province
- İlçe: Kaş

Yılan Island (Turkish: Yılan Adası, literally Snake Island) is a Mediterranean island in Turkey. It is administratively a part of Kaş ilçe (district) of Antalya Province at 36°12′53″N 29°21′17″E.

In the past it was one of the Xenagorou islands (Ancient Greek: Ξεναγόρου νῆσοι).

The uninhabited island is a long island where the longer dimension (south west to north east) is over 2 kilometres (1.2 mi). The shortest distance to the main land (Anatolia) is about 1.5 kilometres (0.93 mi). Sıçan Island, a smaller island is to the north east of Yılan Island. The deep sea to the southern shore of the island is ideal for underwater sports.
