= Gilindire Cave =

Cave in Aydıncık, Mersin, southern Turkey

- Aynalıgöl Mağarası
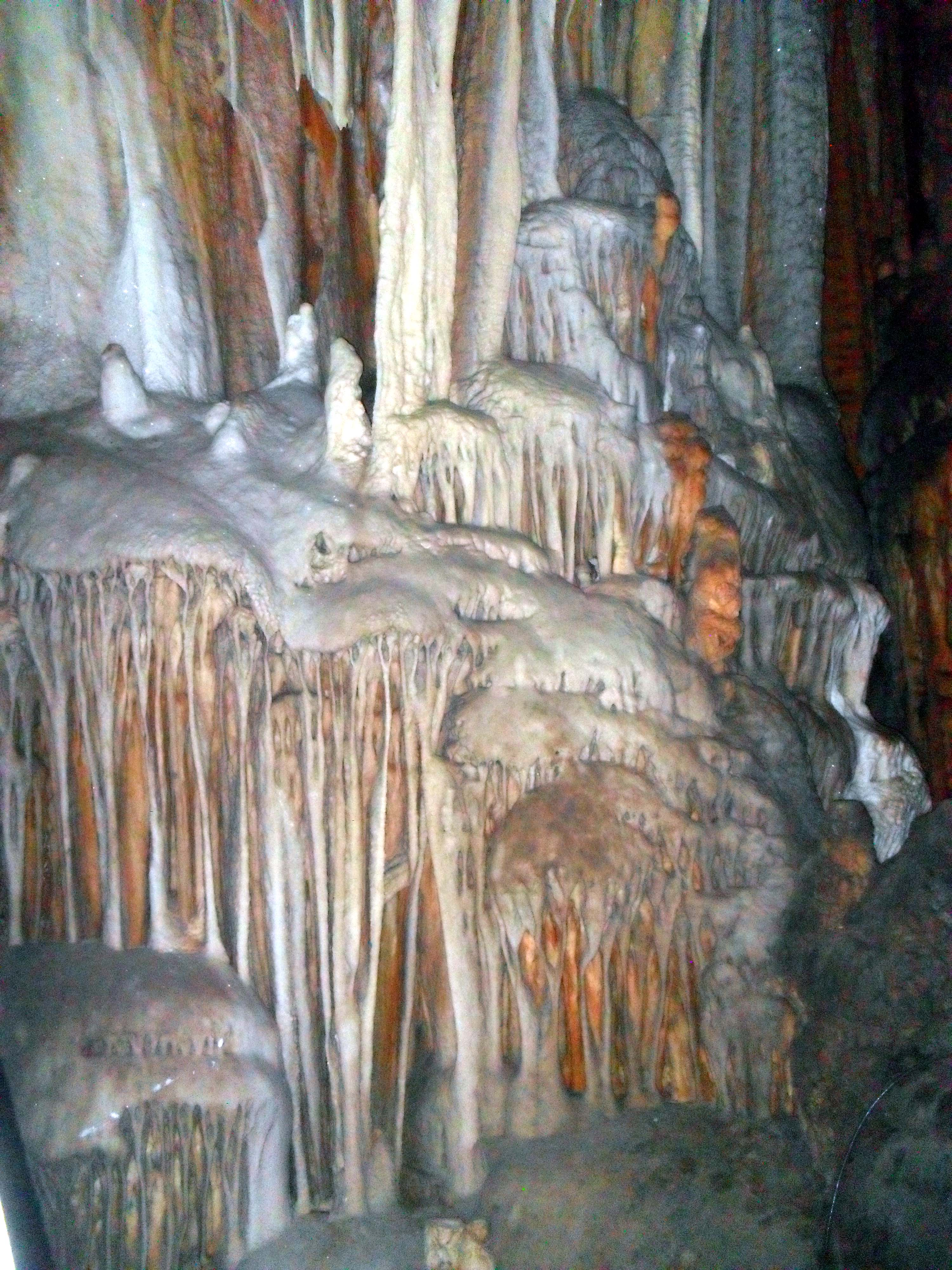
- Stalactite in the cave

- Location within Turkey
- Location: Aydıncık, Mersin, Turkey
- Coordinates: 36°07′52″N 33°24′09″E
- Length: 555 m (1,821 ft)
- Height variation: 22 m (72 ft)
- Discovery: 1999; 27 years ago

Gilindire Cave (Turkish: Gilindire Mağarası), also known as Aynalıgöl Cave, is a cave in Aydıncık, Mersin, southern Turkey. It was discovered by a shepherd in 1999. Gilindire was the former name of the town Aydıncık until 1965.

== Location and access ==
Gilindire Cave is located approximately 7.5 km (4.7 mi) southeast of Sancak Point and Kurtini Creek in the Aydıncık district, part of the Mersin Province. Its entrance faces the Mediterranean Sea, and a small village lies in front of the cave. The cave is accessible by sea via a 1 1/2-hour boat trip from Aydıncık, or by land via a 15–minute walk from the Antalya-Mersin highway. A steel stairway leads down to the cave's entrance from above.

== Description ==
Gilindire Cave stretches over an area of 107 ha (1,070,000 m^{2}). Its entrance is on a cliff 46 m (151 ft) above sea level. The cave has a total length of 555 m (1,821 ft) and a clearance of 22 m (72 ft). It is a horizontally-developed, polygenic-fossilized cave.

The cave features a wealth of stalagmites, stalactites, as well as "pillar, wall and drapery dripstones, leakage stones and cave needles" which divide the interior into many chambers. At the rear of the cave lies a 140 m (460 ft) long, 18–30 m (59–98 ft) wide, and 5–47 m (16–154 ft) deep lake surrounded by dripstones and pillars. The cave is called Aynalıgöl (literally: Mirror Lake) in common parlance, in reference to the presence of the lake.

Some parts of the cave's main gallery are inhabited by bats. Outside the cave, the nearby bays are the habitat of the Mediterranean monk seal.

== Exploration ==
Gilindire Cave was discovered by a shepherd in 1999. When the state-owned Mineral Research and Exploration Co. (MTA) undertook exploration works in the cave, they discovered the lake at the end of the cave, 450 m (1,480 ft) from the entrance. In 2002, two Turkish photographers came to the cave by sea, and took photos for the magazine Atlas both in the cave and underwater in the lake. Archaeologists found potsherds in the cave belonging to the New Stone Age, Copper Age, and Early Bronze Age periods.

According to a survey by experts, the cave was formed in the beginning of the transition phase after the last glacial climate change of the Quaternary Period, when the Mediterranean Sea rose 70 m (230 ft), flooding the bottom of the cave. The change in the hydrological regime helped preserve the cave formations such as stalagmites and stalactites. Due to being under water, they have remained unaffected by atmospheric changes to the present day. The lake's water is brackish to a depth of 12 m (39 ft), while deeper water is saline.

In 2013, Gilindire Cave was designated a nature reserve by the Ministry of Forest and Water Management. It was opened to the public, and has become a tourist attraction.
