= Aydıncık Islands =

Two islands in Turkey

Native name: Aydıncık Adaları
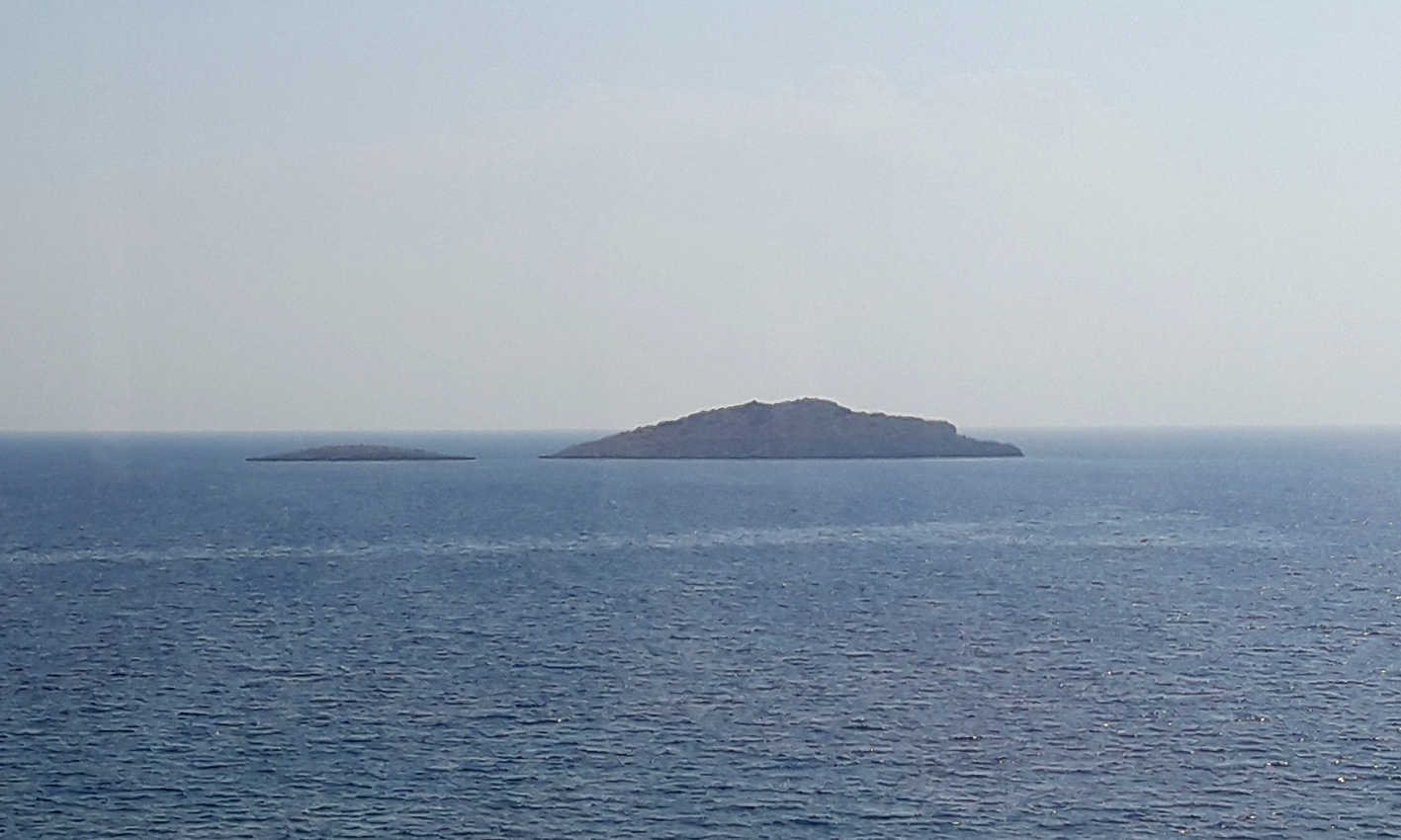

- Location within Turkey

Geography
- Location: Mediterranean Sea
- Coordinates: 36°08′21″N 33°20′55″E

Administration
- Turkey
- İl (province): Mersin Province
- İlçe: Aydıncık

Aydıncık Islands (also known as Gilindire Islands, Turkish: Aydıncık Adaları) are two small Mediterranean islands in Turkey. Their former name was Gilindire, which comes from the name of the former Roman port Kelenderis which is now Aydıncık.

They face Aydıncık ilçe (district) center in Mersin Province. Their distance to Aydıncık is about 2 kilometres (1.2 mi). The nearest point on the mainland is a rock cape to the east about 600 metres (2,000 ft) away. The length of the bigger island at about 36°08′21″N 33°20′55″E is 250 metres (820 ft) and the length of the smaller island at 36°08′27″N 33°20′59″E is 100 metres (330 ft). The distance between the two is 50 metres (160 ft). British admiral Francis Beaufort in his book Caramania points out that no ancient geographer has mentioned these islands

The uninhabited islands are the breeding ground of the Audouin's gull (Larus audouinii).
