= Gulf of Antalya =

Bay of the Mediterranean Sea

Coordinates: 36°30′N 31°00′E

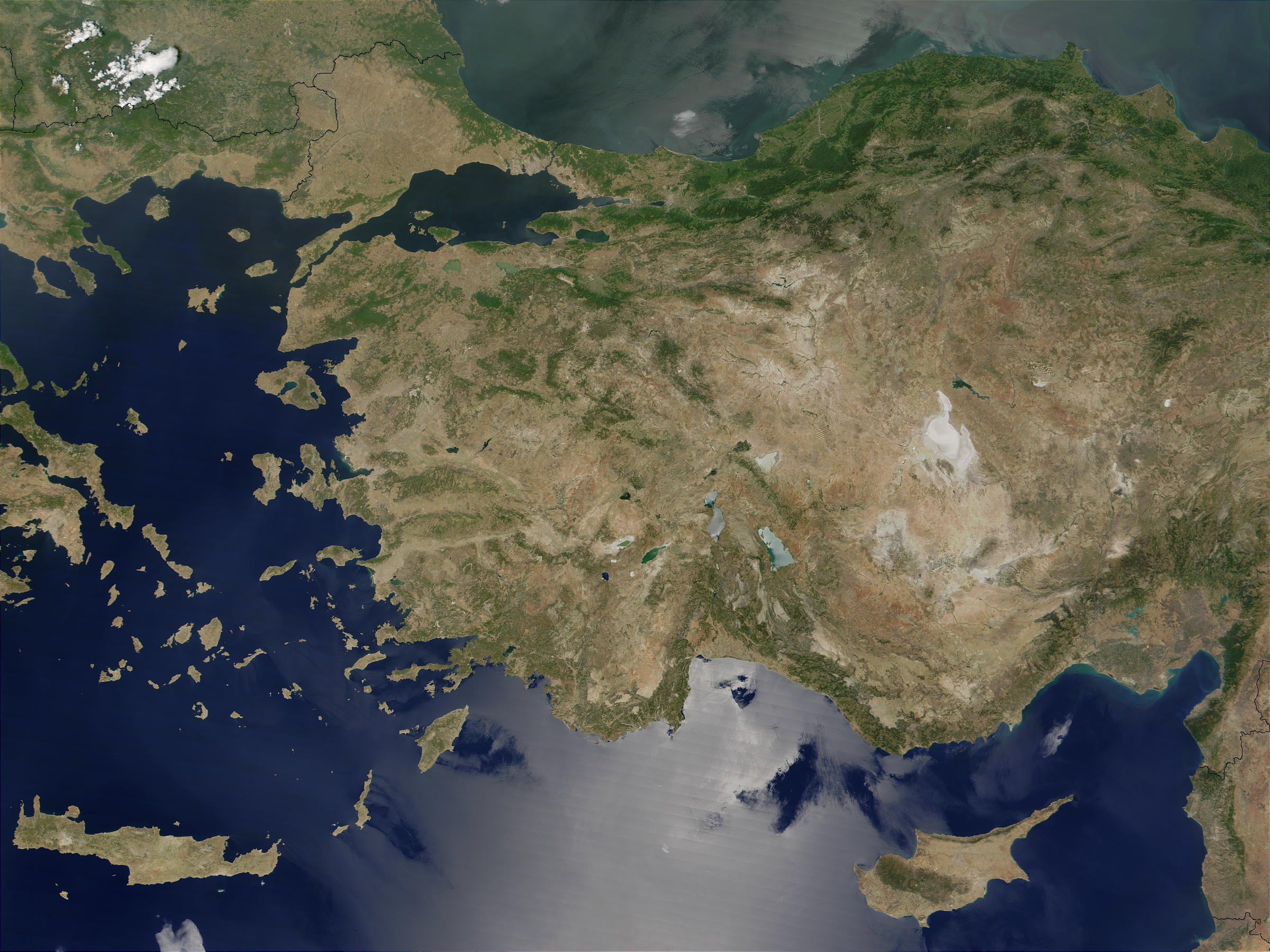
The Gulf of Antalya

The Gulf of Antalya (Turkish: Antalya Körfezi) is a large bay of the northern Levantine Sea, in the eastern Mediterranean Sea south of Antalya Province, Turkey. It includes some of the main seaside resorts of Turkey, also known as the "Turkish Riviera".
