= List of ferry quays in İzmir =

External image
- Gulf of İzmir ferry network map (JPG) by İzdeniz, updated 2019.

There are fifteen passenger ferry quays in İzmir, of which nine are in active service in Gulf of İzmir.

== Background ==
The first ferry services in the Gulf of İzmir were launched in February 1884 by the İzmir Hamidiye Ferry Company. The piers used in those years were wooden. According to the data of 1915, the Konak-Karşıyaka line was used by 1,100,000 people annually, while 900,000 passengers were carried between Konak and Güzelyalı. The Belgians, who bought the company shares in 1908, changed the name of the company. In 1925, a public company called İzmir Port and Gulf Affairs took over the transportation business. Later, Turkish Maritime Organization became responsible for transport in the gulf. At that time, sixty daily services were organized on six lines. İzmir Metropolitan Municipality took over the transportation business in 2000. Today, the company named İzdeniz established by the municipality provides transportation in the gulf. As of 2018, there are nine active ferry quays in the gulf. In 2015, 14,392,982 passengers were carried.

== Quays ==
=== Active ===
Following is the list of active ferry quays:

Interactive map: Interactive map of all ferry quays in İzmir
| Name | Image | Coordinates | District | Date opened | Connections |
|---|---|---|---|---|---|
| Alsancak | Alsancak | 38°26′20.2″N 27°08′26.9″E | Konak | 1950 (first); 2000s (second) | |
| Bostanlı | Bostanlı | 38°27′07.6″N 27°05′51″E | Karşıyaka | 1996 | Bus, Tram |
| Göztepe | Göztepe | 38°23′58.4″N 27°05′00.6″E | Konak | 1988 | Tram |
| Güzelbahçe | Güzelbahçe | 38°22′47.0″N 26°53′36.6″E | Güzelbahçe | 2 May 2003 (first); 18 May 2018 (second) | Bus |
| Karantina | Karantina | 38°24′30.7″N 27°06′23.1″E | Konak | 26 December 2018 | Tram |
| Karşıyaka | Karşıyaka | 38°27′17.3″N 27°07′14.2″E | Karşıyaka | 1900s | Bus, Tram |
| Konak | Konak | 38°25′07.3″N 27°07′31.7″E | Konak | 1900s | Metro, Bus, Tram |
| Pasaport | Pasaport | 38°25′43.7″N 27°07′56.7″E | Konak | 1884 | |
| Üçkuyular | Üçkuyular | 38°24′19.8″N 27°04′15.7″E | Balçova | 1993 | Bus, Tram |

=== Seasonal ===
| Name | Image | Coordinates | District | Date opened | Connections |
|---|---|---|---|---|---|
| Foça | | 38°40′02.8″N 26°45′07.4″E | Foça | 1 August 2015 | |
| Mordoğan | | 38°31′05.1″N 26°37′38.4″E | Karaburun | 6 July 2016 | |
| Urla | | 38°21′50.2″N 26°46′19.2″E | Urla | 26 June 2017 | |
| Yassıca Ada | | 38°24′23.7″N 26°47′39.6″E | Urla | June 2001 | |

=== Inactive ===
| Name | Image | Coordinates | District | Date opened | Date closed |
|---|---|---|---|---|---|
| Bayraklı | Bayraklı | 38°27′48.7″N 27°09′40.9″E | Bayraklı | 6 May 2001 | 1 June 2016 |
| Karaburun | | 38°38′59.2″N 26°31′00.9″E | Karaburun | 2007 (first); 2016 (second) | 2022 |
