= Yassıca Island =

Island in Turkey

Native name: Yassıca Ada
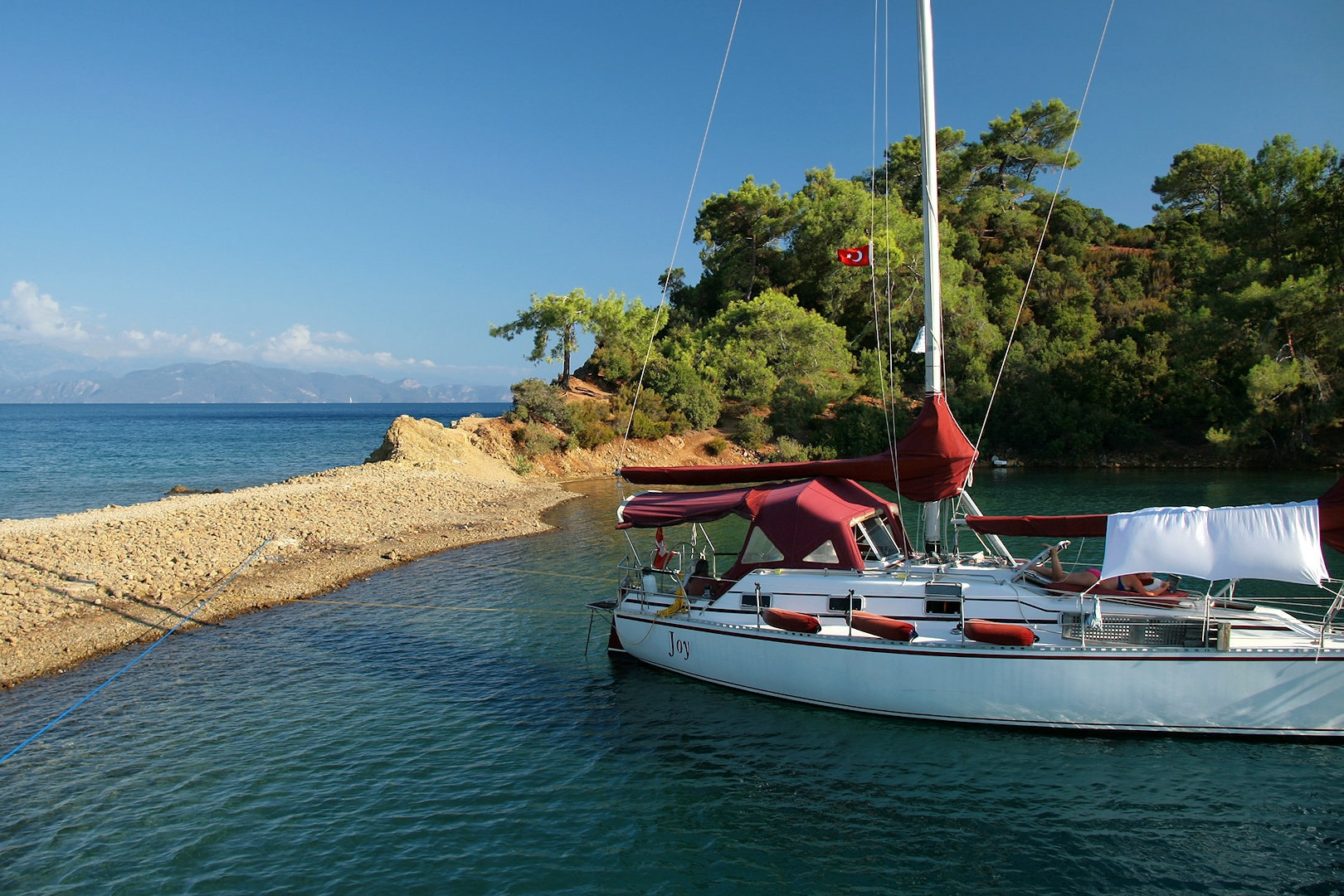
- Yassıca island

- Location within Turkey

Geography
- Location: Aegean Sea
- Coordinates: 38°24′39″N 26°47′37″E

Administration
- Turkey
- İl (province): İzmir Province
- İlçe: Urla

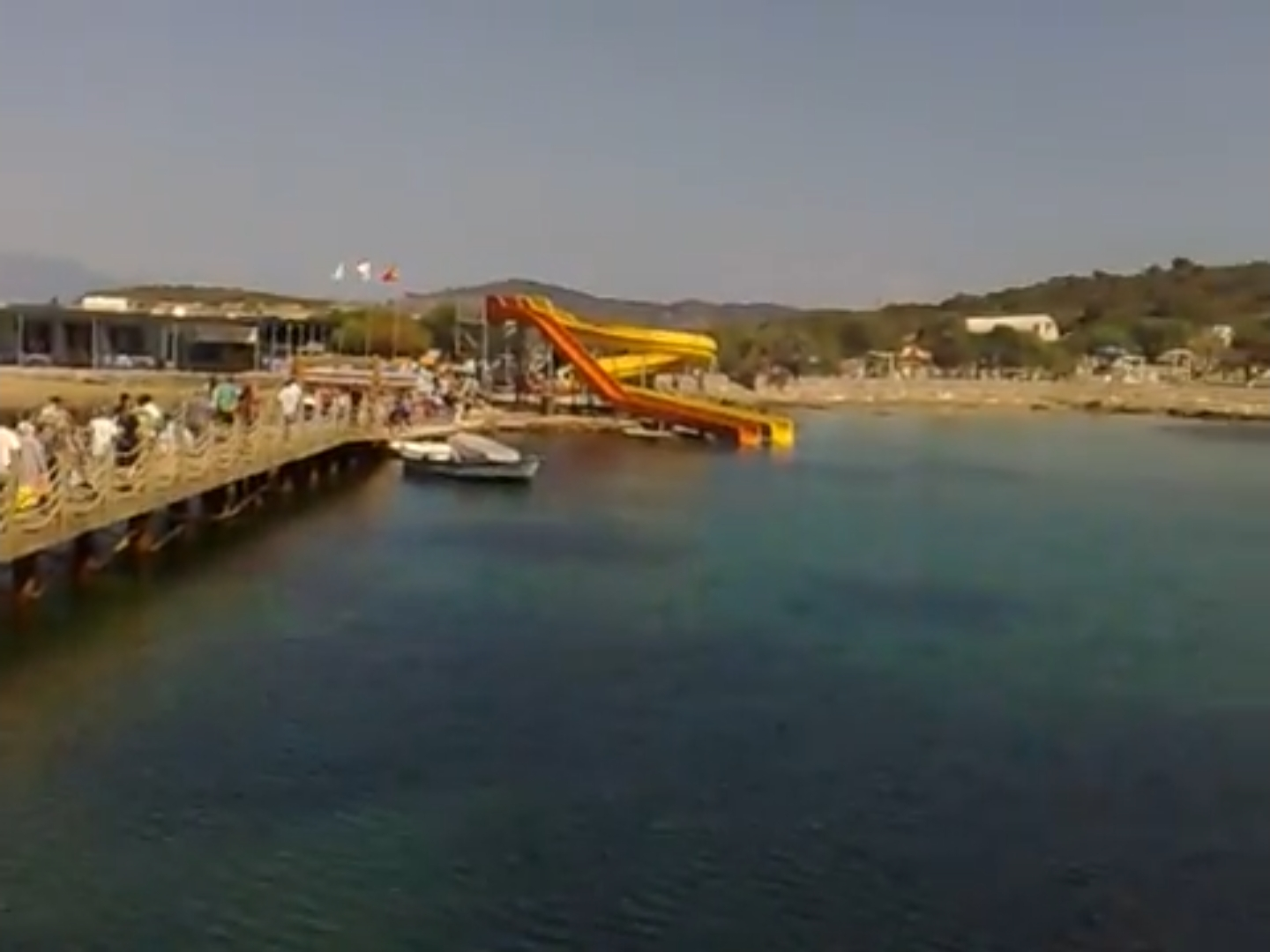
Yassıca Island in 2010

Yassıca Island (Turkish: Yassıca Ada, literally, "flat island") is an island in the Gulf of İzmir, Turkey. Sometimes the island is also called Alman Adası ("German's Island"), or Halk Adası (Public Island). (Some Menemen district residents also call as Bilgin Adası (Scholar's Island) but this is not used a lot)

The island is a part of the Urla ilçe (district) of İzmir Province. Its distance to the nearest point on the mainland (Karaburun Peninsula of Anatolia) is about 4 kilometres (2.5 mi) and to Pırnarlı Island is 1 kilometre (0.62 mi). Yassıca Island surrounded by Pırnarlı Island, Akça Island, İncirli Island, Hekim Island, and Arap Islets and Körtaş Islets. Its surface area is 0.25 square kilometres (0.097 sq mi).

The island is uninhabited, but the İzmir municipality has established a quay, a 400-meter beach and a restaurant in the southern part of the island. İzdeniz (İzmir municipality’s transportation company) operates regular ferry services from Konak and Karşıyaka terminals to the island. The voyage time to Yassıca Island from the mainland is about 1.5 hours.
