= Çiçek Islands =

Island group off the coast of Turkey

Coordinates: 38°24′N 26°47′E

Çiçek Islands is an island group in the Gulf of İzmir, Turkey, located off the coast of Urla. The island group includes Akça, İncirli Island, Pırnarlı Island, Yassıca Island, Arap Islets, and Körtaş Islets. Çiçek Islands are considered as an Important Bird Area.

== Geography ==
The island group includes Akça, İncirli Island, Pırnarlı Island, Yassıca Island, Arab Islets, and Körtaş Islets. It is located in the Gulf of İzmir, off the coast of Urla.

== Geology ==
Çiçek Islands were formed during the Middle Miocene geological period.

== Flora and fauna ==
Quercus ilex, Quercus coccifera, Pistacia lentiscus, Phillyrea latifolia, Arbutus unedo, and Olea europaea are the most common plants on the island group. It houses a significant amount of Caspian gulls (Larus cachinnans). For this reason, it is considered as an Important Bird Area. It also hosts the Mediterranean monk seal (Monachus monachus).

== Economy ==
The islands, which are uninhabited, are important destinations for daily tourism. There are fish farms off the shores of the islands.

== See also ==
- Foça Islands
