= Akça =

Island in İzmir, Turkey

Coordinates: 38°23′56″N 26°46′44″E

Akça is a Turkish island shaped like a shellfish near the biggest city of the Turkish Aegean coast İzmir. It is an uninhabited island and there are only bushes on the island. It is situated between Arap Islands, Yassıca Island, Çiçek Islands, Körtaş Islands and İncirli Island. It is off the coast of Port of Urla. It is a small island surrounded with turquoise waters, thus it is a swimming spot for the residents of İzmir in summertime.

The Greek name for Akça was Nisida Patates. The Southwest part of the island is a little rocky and there is a small islet called Akçaca Islet 100 m. off the coast.
