= State road D.505 (Turkey) =

Highway in Turkey

Route information
- Length: 53 km (33 mi)

Major junctions
- North end: Karaburun
- South end: D.505 D.300 near Gülbahçe

Location
- Country: Turkey

Highway system
- Highways in Turkey; Motorways; List; State Highways; List
← D.490	→ D.515

D.505 is a 54-kilometre-long (34 mi), two-lane state road on the Karaburun Peninsula, in İzmir Province of western Turkey. The route runs from Karaburun at the tip of the peninsula to the intersection with the D300 near Gülbahçe. Traffic on the D505 is heavy during holidays, especially in the summer, due to the many vacation homes situated along the route.
