= Konak İskele (Tram İzmir) =

LRT station in İzmir, Turkey

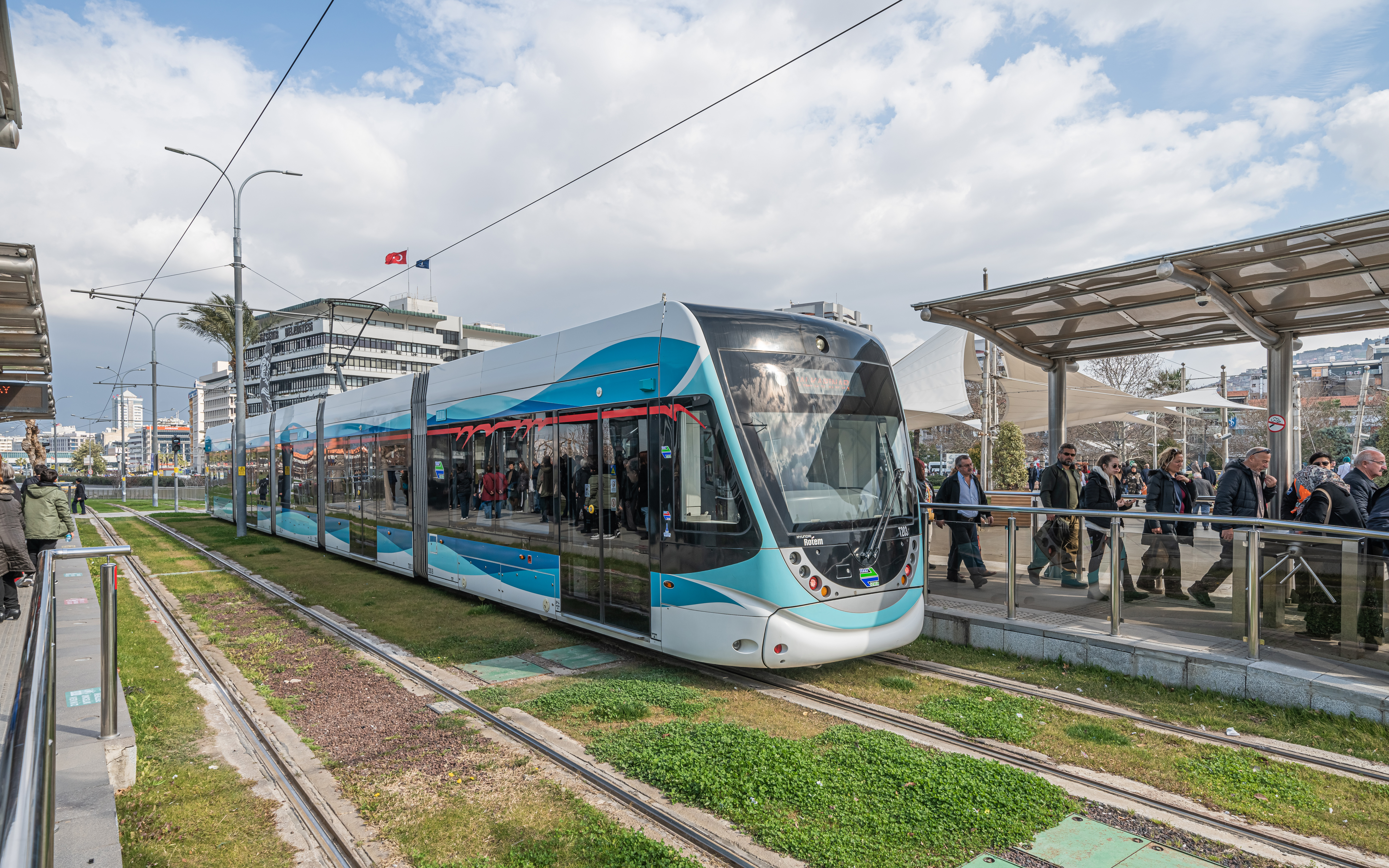

General information
- Location: Kent Parkı, Konak Mah., 35250; Konak
- Coordinates: 38.418694°N 27.127222°E
- System: Tram İzmir light-rail station
- Owner: İzmir Metropolitan Municipality
- Operator: İzmir Metro A.Ş.
- Line: T2
- Platforms: 2 side platforms
- Tracks: 2
- Connections: İzmir Metro at Konak station İzdeniz at Konak Terminal; ESHOT Bus: Konak: 10, 72, 104, 105, 152, 171, 233, 285, 303, 304, 374, 465, 466, 471, 484, 485, 508, 887; Bahribaba: 15, 21, 27, 29, 30, 32, 33, 35, 121, 157, 193, 224, 253, 302, 550, 587, 588, 811, 910, 920, 930, 940, 950, 951; İskele: 35, 121, 202, 253, 302, 466, 910, 920, 930, 940, 950, 951; Belediye Sarayı: 18, 19, 20, 121, 202, 253, 302, 466, 811, 910, 920, 930, 940, 950

Construction
- Accessible: Yes

History
- Opened: 24 March 2018
- Electrified: 750V DC OHLE

Services
| Preceding station | Tram İzmir | Following station |
|---|---|---|
| Karataş towards Fahrettin Altay | T2 | Gazi Bulvarı towards Halkapınar |
Location

Konak İskele is a light-rail station on the Konak Tram of the Tram İzmir system in İzmir, Turkey. It is located on within the Konak Kent Park, in front of the Konak Terminal (Turkish: Konak İskele), from which the station gets its name. Transfer is available to the İzmir Metro at Konak station as well İzdeniz ferry service at Konak Ferry Terminal. There is also a transfer to ESHOT buses. To the east of the station is Konak Square and the İzmir Clock Tower as well as many governmental buildings along with the historical Kemeraltı marketplace.

Konak İskele station opened on 24 March 2018.

== Nearby Places of Interest ==
- Konak Square
  - İzmir Clock Tower
- Kemeraltı
- İzmir Art and Sculpture Museum
