= Özbek =

Özbek may refer to:

- Uzbeks

== Places in Turkey ==
- Özbek, Çanakkale
- Özbek, Elbistan
- Özbek, Kulp
- Özbek, Şabanözü
- Özbek, Urla

== People with the surname ==
- Aysun Özbek (born 1977), Turkish volleyball player
- Barış Özbek (born 1986), Turkish-German footballer
- Rifat Ozbek (born 1953), Turkish fashion designer
- Setenay Özbek (born 1962), Turkish writer
- Ufuk Özbek (born 1992), Turkish footballer
