= Mordoğan =

- Neighbourhood
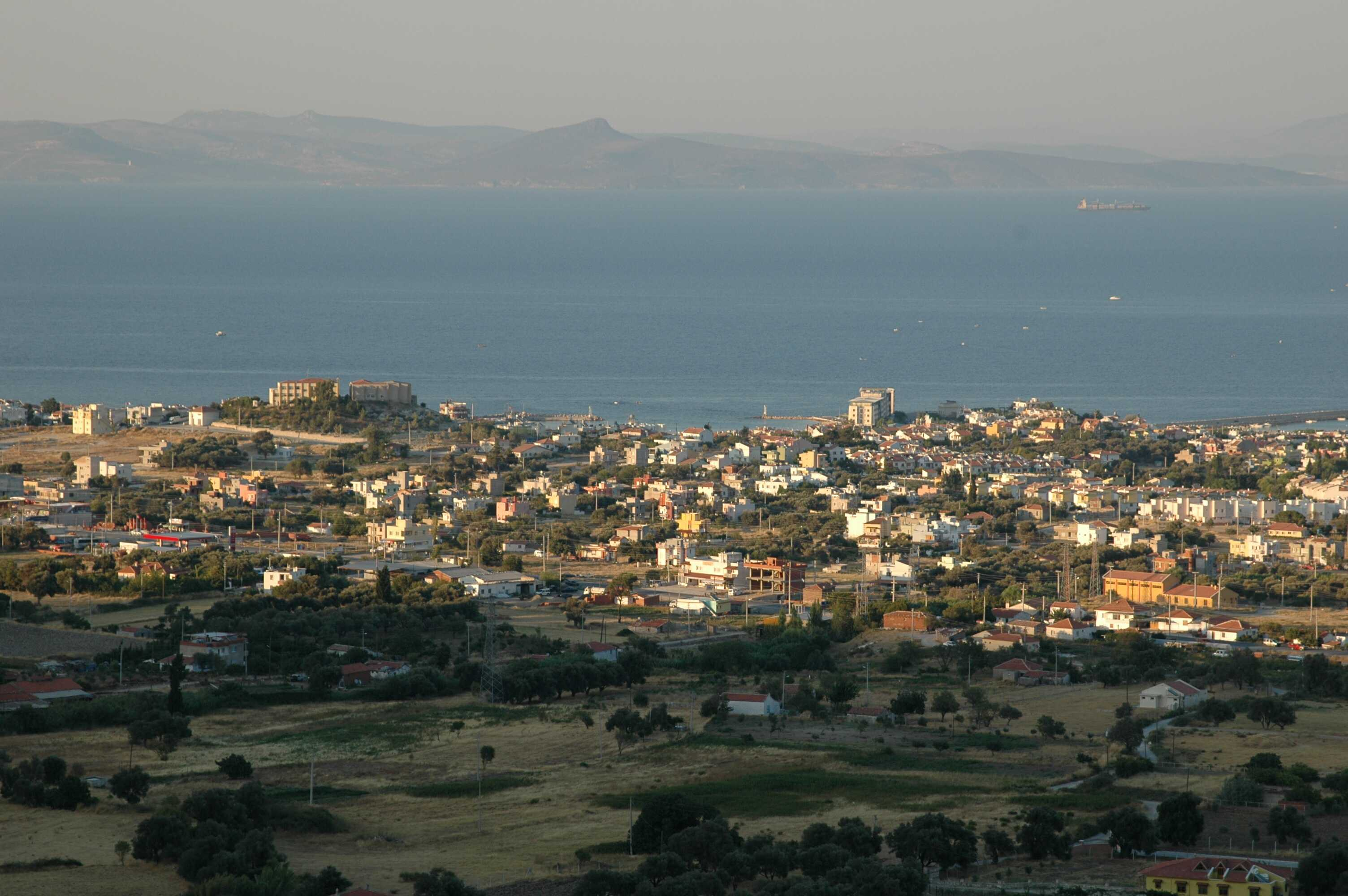

- Location within Turkey Location within İzmir
- Coordinates: 38°31′N 26°36′E
- Country: Turkey
- Province: İzmir
- District: Karaburun
- Population (2022): 5,433
- Time zone: UTC+3 (TRT)
- Postal code: 35970
- Area code: 0232

Mordoğan is a neighbourhood in the municipality and district of Karaburun, İzmir Province, Turkey. Its population is 5,433 (2022). Before the 2013 reorganisation, it was a town (belde). The town is situated on the eastern shoreline of Karaburun Peninsula within the Gulf of İzmir at about twenty kilometers to the south of the district center of Karaburun. Mordoğan equals the district center in economic development terms, especially in tourism, and has a number of accommodation facilities and restaurants, being advantaged by being located before the district center when coming from İzmir and by being served by a modern and easy land-route.

== Gallery ==
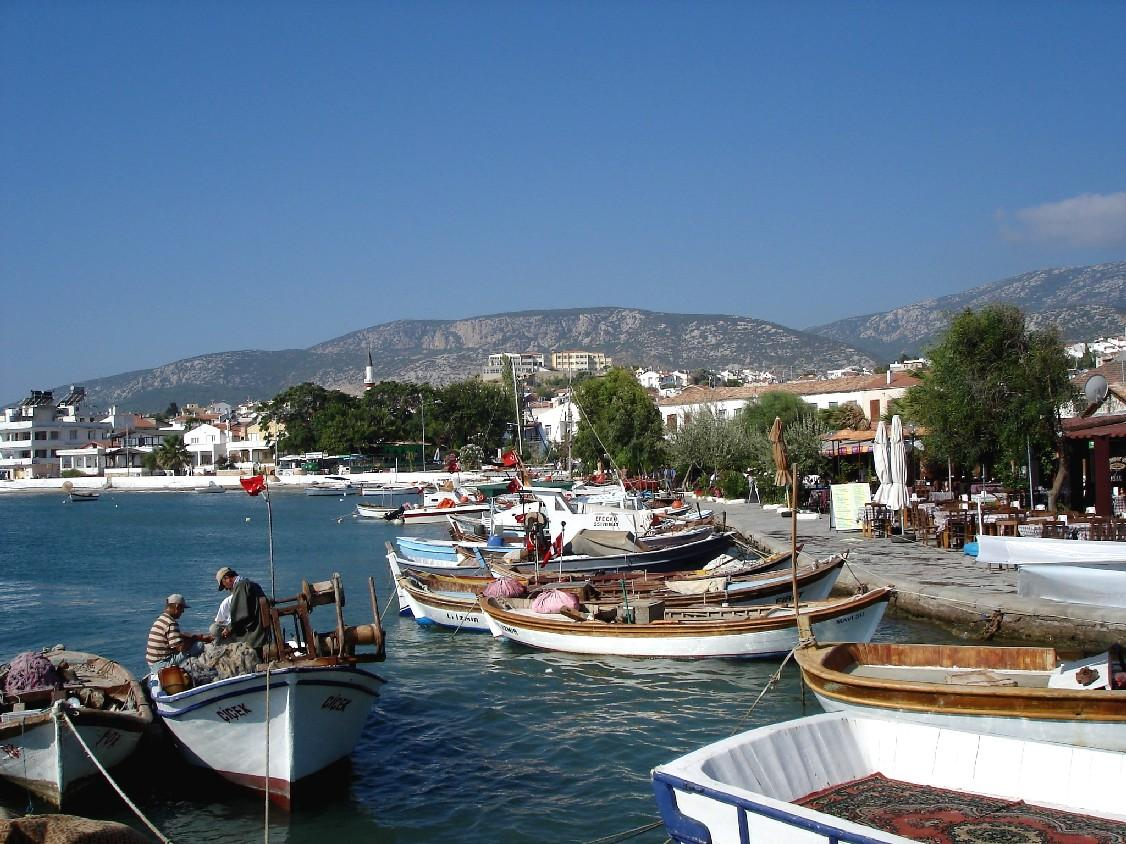
Mordoğan fishboats' quay

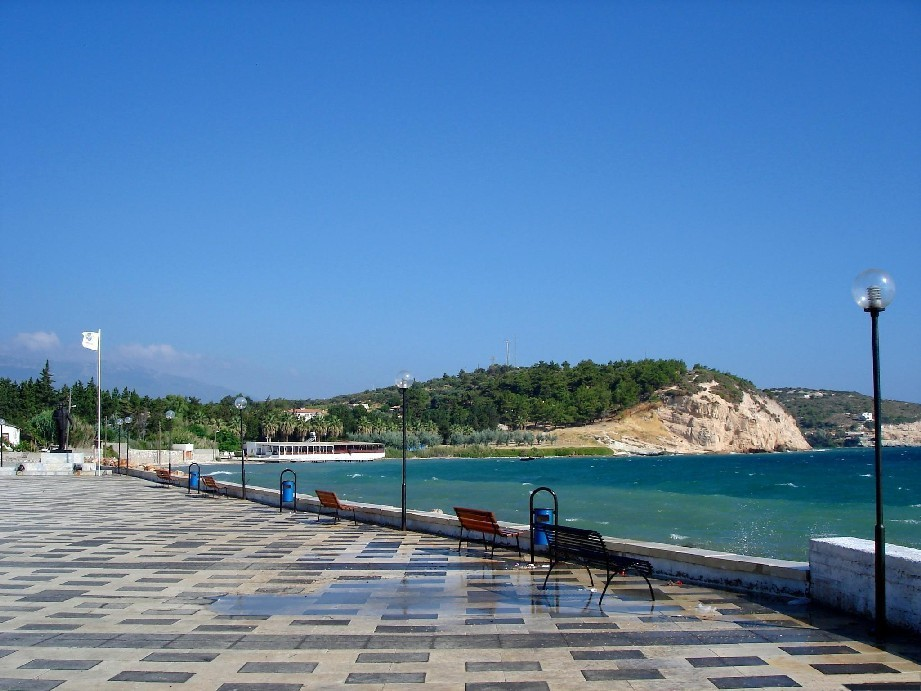
Mordoğan sea-side promenade
