= Pasaport Ferry Terminal =

Passenger ferry terminal in Konak, İzmir, Turkey on the Gulf of İzmir

Pasaport Terminal
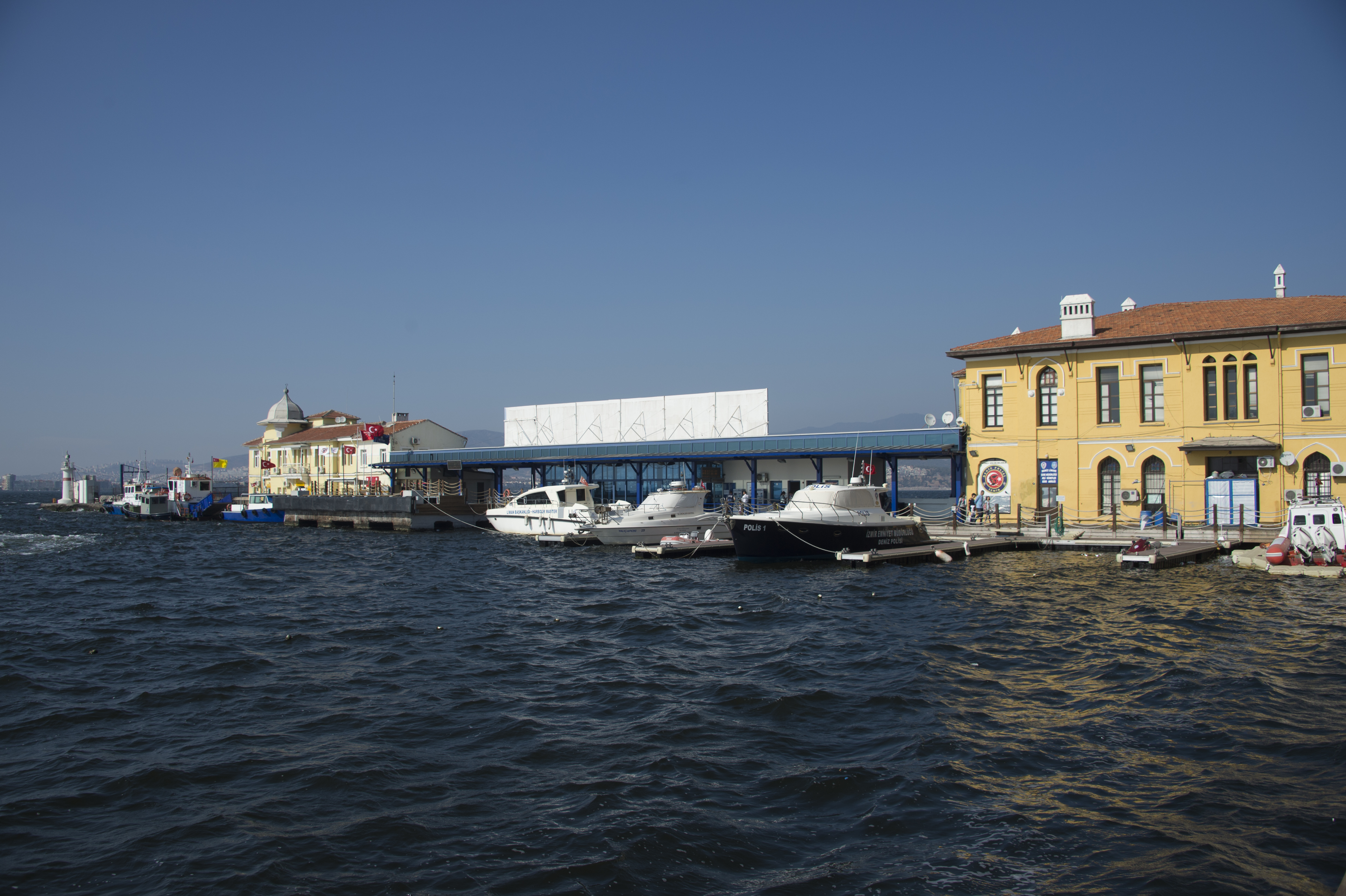
- Pasaport Ferry Terminal in İzmir

General information
- Location: Atatürk Cd., Akdeniz Mah., 35210; Konak, İzmir; Turkey
- Coordinates: 38.4285°N 27.1330°E
- Operator: İzdeniz
- Lines: Alsancak-Karşıyaka; Alsancak-Bostanlı; Pasaport-Karşıyaka; Pasaport-Bostanlı; Alsancak-Üçkuyular

Construction
- Accessible: Yes

History
- Opened: 1884
- Rebuilt: 1926, 2003
Location

Pasaport Ferry Terminal (Turkish: Pasaport İskelesi) is a passenger ferry terminal in Konak, İzmir on the Gulf of İzmir. It is located at the northern end of the historic Pasaport Quay on the southwestern side of Cumhuriyet Square. İzdeniz operates commuter ferry service to other terminals around the city. Pasaport was originally built in 1884, as an add-on to the Pasaport Harbor which was constructed between 1867 and 1884.

Pasaport Terminal is the halfway point between Alsancak and Konak Terminals.

== History ==
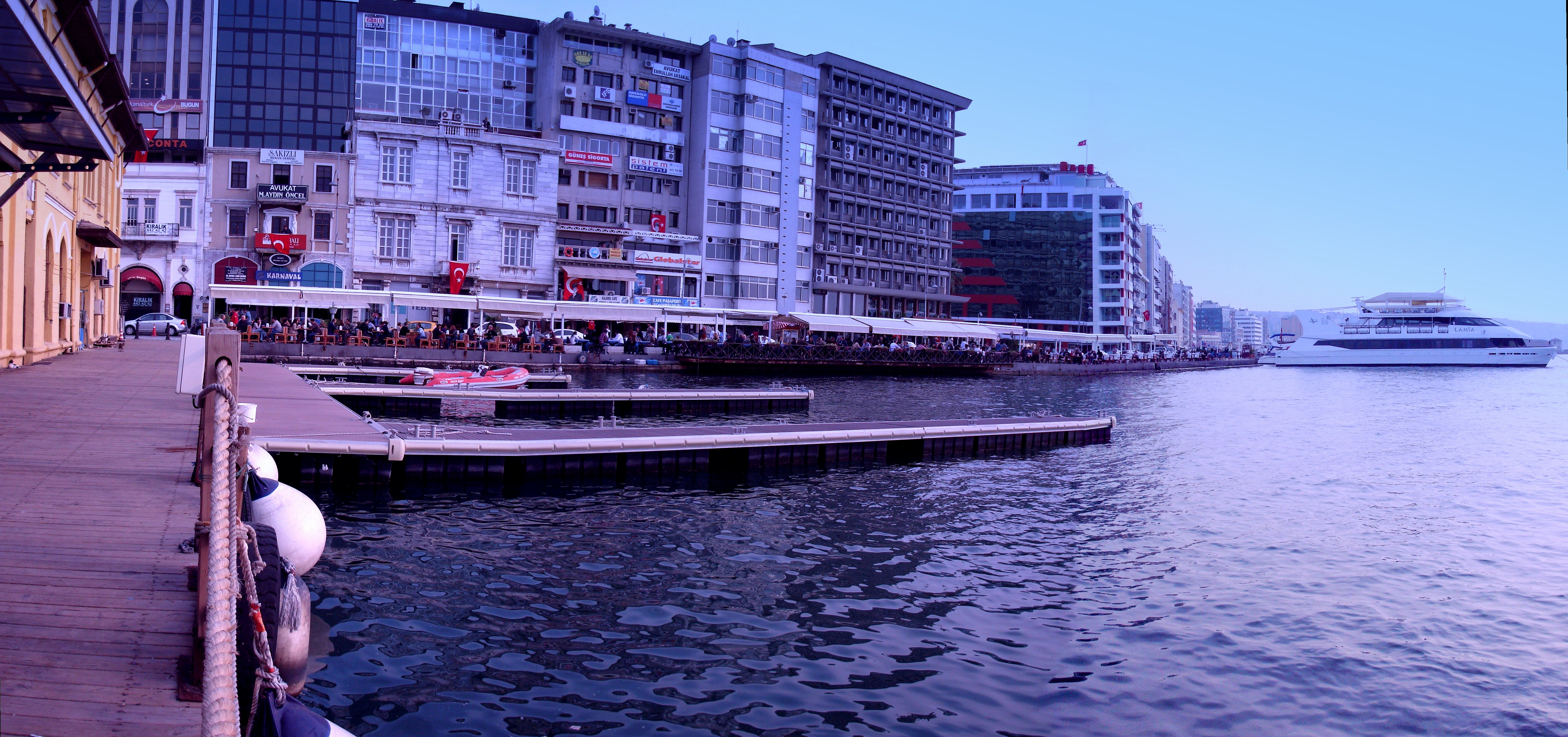
View of İzmir from the Pasaport Ferry Terminal

The ferry terminal building was constructed as part of the Port of Smyrna along with the quay and the breakwater by the French company Guiffray after projects of British engineers between 1867 and 1886. It was used as a checkpoint for international sea traffic. It took its name from its function as passport control site. A historic postcard featuring the building names it as the "Débarcadère et Bureau de Passeports" (Wharf and Passport Office).

The 1884-established passenger ferry line company, the "Gulf of Smyrna Ottoman Ferries Hamidiyye Inc.", operated Pasaport Ferry Terminal in the past connecting it with the ferry terminals Karşıyaka, Alaybey, Osmanzade, Turan, Bayraklı, Konak, Karataş, Salhane and Göztepe with a flotilla of eight passenger ferry boats. The company's head office was also in the building.

In 1922, the Great Fire of Smyrna, which began four days after the Turkish troops recaptured the city on September 9 that ended the Greco-Turkish War (1919–22), destroyed the building along with much of the port city. The building remained a ruin for some years.

Redesigned in inspiration of Seljuk-Ottoman architectural style of the First National Architectural Movement, it was rebuilt in the office time of Kâzım Dirik, who was appointed governor of the city in 1926.

In 1948, the building became headquarters of the Customs Guard Command. From 1957 on, it hosted the Customs Guard Directorate following the reorganization of the Customs Administration.

In 1970, the nearby police station of Kantar moved next to the building.

== Present usage ==
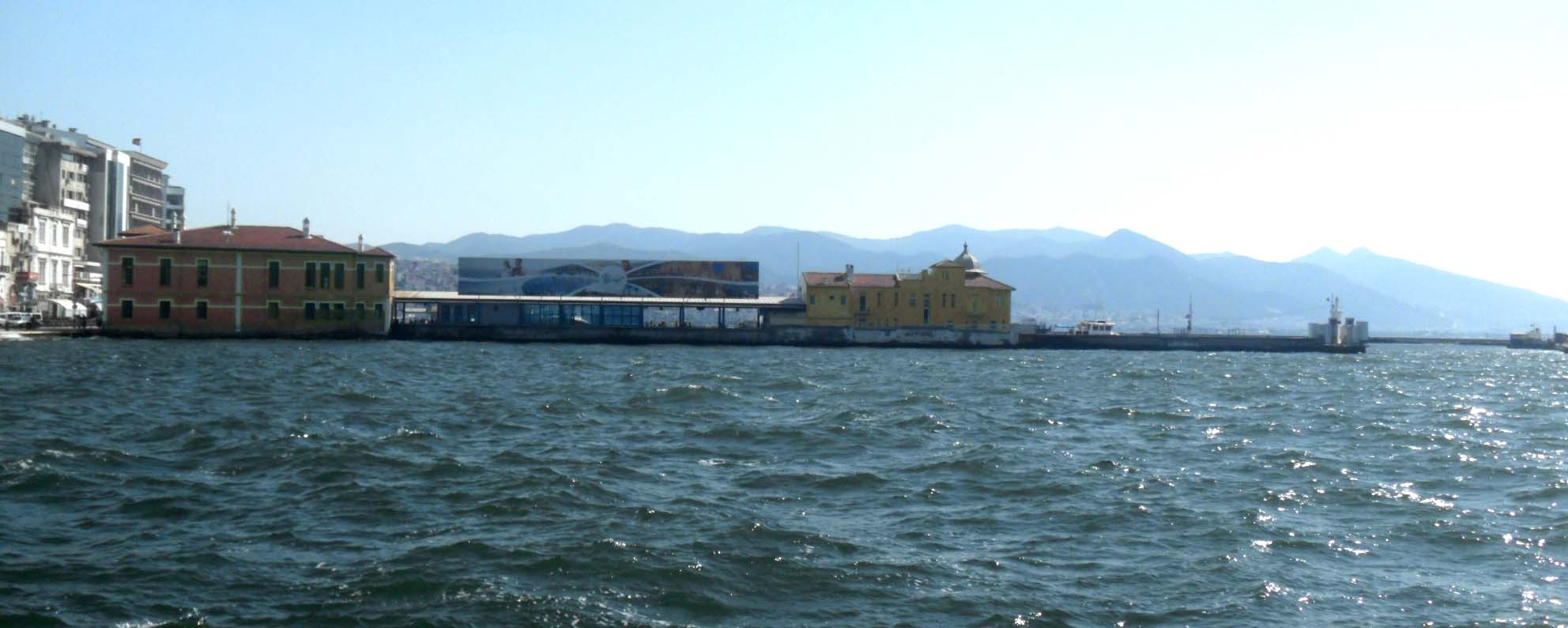
Pasaport Ferry Terminal in İzmir

To meet the requirements of the growing passenger traffic, the ferry terminal was renovated and modernized by the Metropolitan Municipality of İzmir. It was put in service again on December 15, 2003 after its closure due to works between May and November of the same year.

Operated by the local passenger ferry line İzdeniz, the terminal is connected with terminals along with Konak and Alsancak terminals Üçkuyular, Göztepe, Bayraklı, Bostanlı and Karşıyaka. With a total of 75 departures per day (35 to Alsancak-Karşıyaka, 28 to Alsancak-Bostanlı, 10 to Konak-Göztepe-Üçkuyular and 2 to Bayraklı), Pasaport Terminal is a busy one in İzmir.
