= Eğlenhoca =

Village in İzmir Province, Turkey

- Neighbourhood
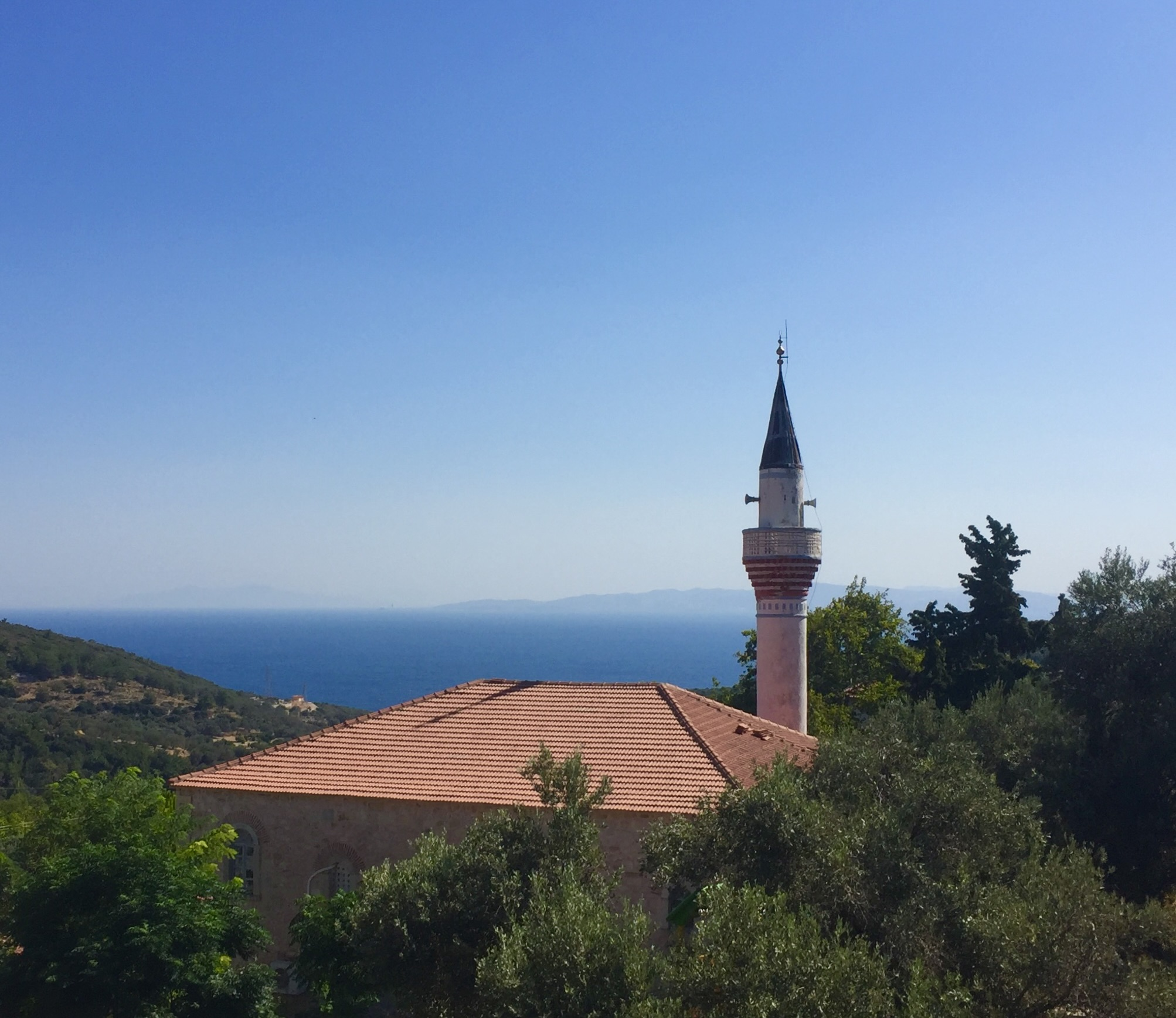

- Location within Turkey Location within İzmir
- Coordinates: 38°32′33″N 26°34′11″E
- Country: Turkey
- Province: İzmir
- District: Karaburun
- Population (2022): 471
- Time zone: UTC+3 (TRT)
- Postal code: 35970
- Area code: 0232

Eğlenhoca is a neighbourhood in the municipality and district of Karaburun, İzmir Province, Turkey. Its population is 471 (2022).

The village is known for its farms, livestock, and vineyards, especially for the Sultaniye and Razaki varieties of grape and the Hurma variety of olive and is included in the İzmir Municipality's touristic Olive and Vineyard Routes.

== Name ==
Local legends tell that the village name originates in a religious leader who did not want to stay. According to one version, a religious teacher (hoca) came to the village, stayed a while, but then became restless and wanted to leave; the villagers did not want this and asked him to "stay (eğlen), hoca, stay" or "enjoy (eğlen), hoca, enjoy." According to another version, in the 15th century during a cholera epidemic, only a few villagers and the local imam survived. Because the villagers were not paying him, the imam did not show up to prayers one day. The next Friday, they called him to prayers and said, "Stay (Eğlen), hoca. You are now our imam, so we will pay your salary." The imam replied, "You say to me Eğlen Hoca, but you have not even given your village a name." The villagers said, "Let the village be named after you: Eğlenhoca."

The name of the village has sometimes been spelled Eylenhoca in Turkish, for instance, in the records of the Turkish census from 1945 to 1975. The name of the village appears in an early 20th-century German atlas as Jylan Chodja (Yılan Hoca) and in Greek as Γιλανχοτζας (Yilankhotzas).

== History ==
A Paleolithic site has been reported at Kemerdağı, east of the village. Ancient settlements have also been reported in the area of the village, with Byzantine-era building stones, columns, and a relief found in nearby fields.

The present village is said to have been founded in 1505.

In 1936, because of famine brought about by the failure of the grape crop, the Red Crescent distributed staple foods to the village and surrounding area. In 1949, the village and surrounding area experienced an earthquake of X intensity on the Mercalli-Sieberg scale, which left several houses uninhabitable. A delegation of politicians including Celâl Bayar and Adnan Menderes visited the village and surrounding area soon after the earthquake. In 1969, the village and surrounding area experienced another earthquake which caused heavy damage.

== Population ==
The population of the village has been declining overall since the 1960s:

- In 1831, there were 103 Muslim households, with 114 Muslim males of working age, 3 Greek Orthodox (Rum) males of working age, and 4 slaves.
- In 1923, there were 157 households, with 331 males and 356 females, for a total population of 687.

Historical population

Year	Pop.	±% p.a.
1923	687	—
1940	702	+0.13%
1945	731	+0.81%
1960	788	+0.50%
1965	757	−0.80%
1970	715	−1.14%
1975	628	−2.56%
1980	666	+1.18%

Year	Pop.	±% p.a.
1985	638	−0.86%
1990	578	−1.96%
1997	601	+0.56%
2007	431	−3.27%
2012	400	−1.48%
2017	399	−0.05%
2022	471	+3.37%

Source: Population censuses (1923-1997) and TÜIK (2007-2022)

== Transportation ==
Before the construction of major roads, the village depended on boat transportation, with a pier to the north of the village in Kösedere İskelesi on the Gulf of Izmir. In 1933, the Urla-Karaburun road was opened, passing very near the village.

== Traditions ==
=== Architectural traditions ===
A traditional house in Eğlenhoca has one or two stories. The walls of the lower story are built of yellowish-white rubble stones, with gaps filled by smaller stones and bits of brick or tile. The stones are bound with mud mortar to form walls 60-80 cm thick. The corners of the walls are shaped with somewhat larger and more-shaped rubble stones. Timber ties are also often used. The exterior walls of the upper story are similar to those of the lower story, but only 50–60 cm thick. The interior walls of the upper story are bağdadi work, that is, a timber frame with horizontal laths covered in a thick mixture of mud and straw. Roofs are timber frame, hipped or in a gable, and covered in alaturka "over and under" tiles. In 2019, 42% of buildings in the village were of traditional type, though some were in ruins.

=== Bridal traditions ===
The traditional head decoration for a bride in Eğlenhoca used to be gilded bay leaves. Before the bride mounted her horse to go to the wedding celebration, the bride's father would tie a red sash called the "effort sash" (gayret kuşağı) around her waist; bundled into the end of the sash was some money. The sash was said to show that the bride would not be lazy or avoid work in her new home.

== Main sights ==
=== Mosque ===
Construction on the Eğlenhoca Mosque was begun in 1813-14 and finished in 1846. The mosque underwent important repairs and decoration from 1899 to 1902. The building is rectangular in plan, with a flat wooden ceiling and wooden dome, and room for a congregation of 201.

=== Reservoir ===
Southwest of the village is the Karaburun-Mordoğan Lake (also called the Eğlenhoca Lake), a reservoir in the Kaşkudan Valley for irrigation and drinking water. The dam was completed in 2007, the resulting reservoir is the largest in the district of Karaburun.
