= Quarantine Island =

Quarantine Island may refer to:

- Quarantine Island / Kamau Taurua near Dunedin, New Zealand
- Rainsford Island near Boston, Massachusetts in the United States
- Sand Island (Hawaii)
- Karantina Island, near İzmir, Turkey
