= Hekim Island =

Island in Turkey

Native name: Hekim Adası
- Location within Turkey

Geography
- Location: Aegean Sea
- Coordinates: 38°26′41″N 26°45′56″E

Administration
- Turkey
- İl (province): İzmir Province
- İlçe: Urla
- Area covered: 2.5 km^{2} (0.97 sq mi)

Hekim Island (a.k.a. Kilise Island) is an Aegean island of Turkey. It is in the gulf of İzmir and a part of Urla ilçe (district) of İzmir Province at 38°26′41″N 26°45′56″E. It is the second largest of the islands in the gulf (collectively known as Urla Islands) with 2.5 square kilometres (0.97 sq mi) area. The nearest point on the main land to the west is 2.5 kilometres (1.6 mi) distant. Presently the visits to island are not allowed.

Scholars tentatively identify Hekim Island with the island anciently known as Pele (Ancient Greek: Πήλη), which was opposite to Clazomenae and was noted by numerous ancient authors including Thucydides, Pliny the Elder, and Stephanus of Byzantium. During the Peloponnesian War after an unsuccessful attack in Clazomenae, some of the ships in the Astyochus fleet were put at the Marathusa, Pele and Drimyssa islands which lie over against Clazomenae.

== Trivia ==
The name of the island hekim means "doctor". According to a legend a doctor who was on his way to Greece according to the Population exchange between Greece and Turkey agreement chose to stay in İzmir and settled in the island to create his own farm.
