= Yılan Island (Urla) =

Island in Izmir Province, Turkey

Yılan Island (Da Vinci Island)
- Location within Turkey

Geography
- Location: Aegean Sea
- Coordinates: 38°19′52″N 26°40′39″E

Administration
- Turkey
- İl (province): İzmir Province
- İlçe: Urla

Yılan Island or Da Vinci Island (Turkish: Yılan Adası or Da Vinci Adası, literally "Snake Island") is an Aegean island of Turkey. It was formerly known in Greek as Nisida Erimo (Νησίδα Έρημο).

Administratively it is a part of Urla ilçe (district) of İzmir Province at 38°19′52″N 26°40′39″E. It is almost at the center of Gülbahçe bay. The distance to the nearest point at the main land is about 1 kilometre (0.62 mi). The longest dimension of the uninhabited island is about 500 metres (1,600 ft).
