= Gülbahçe, Urla =

Gülbahçe
- Neighbourhood
- Location within Turkey
- Coordinates: 38°19′58″N 26°38′44″E
- Country: Turkey
- Province: İzmir
- District: Urla
- Elevation: 20 m (66 ft)
- Population (2022): 5,340
- Time zone: UTC+3 (TRT)
- Area code: 0232

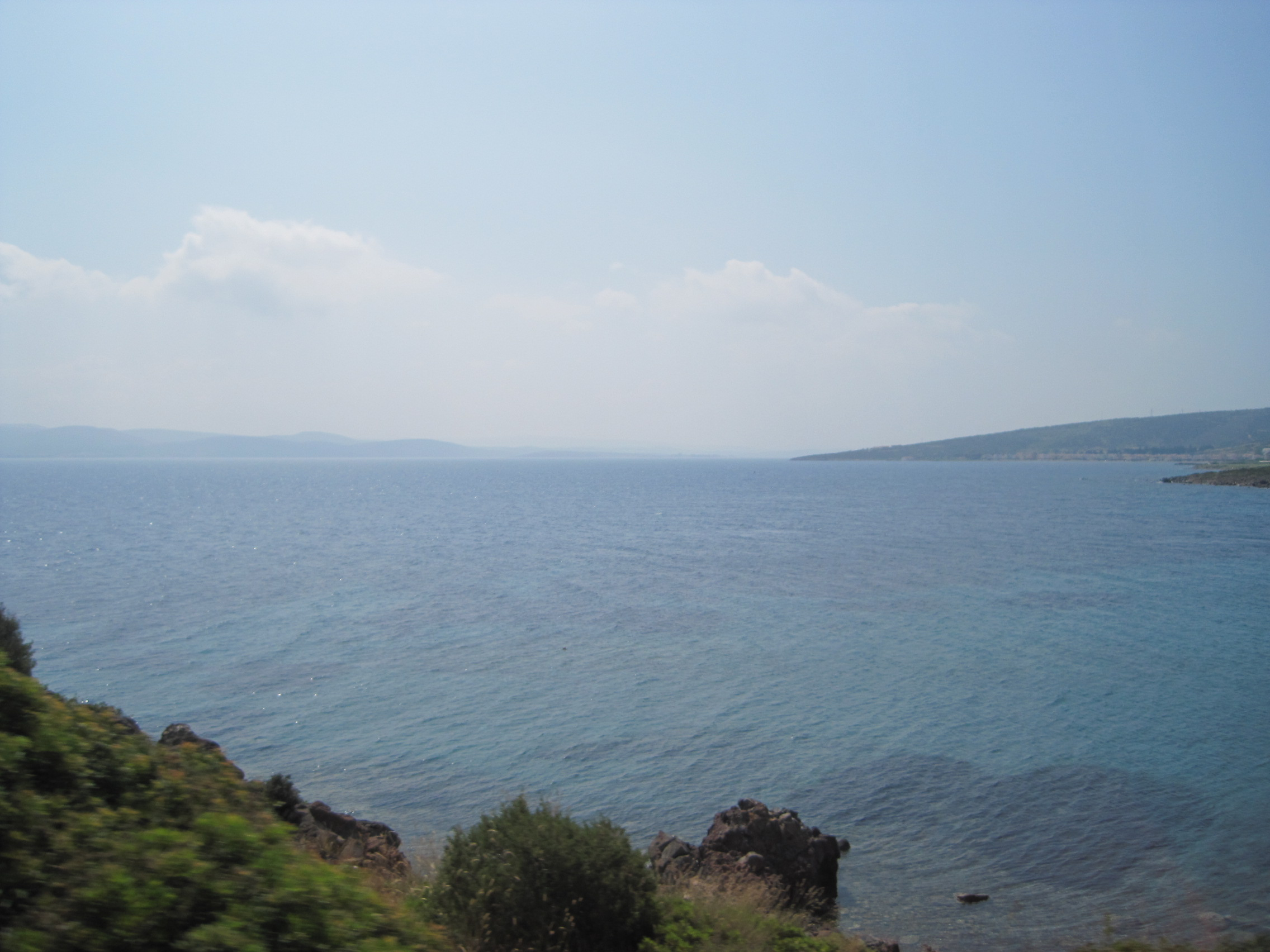
Gülbahçe, district of Urla, İzmir province, Turkey

Gülbahçe is a neighbourhood in the municipality and district of Urla, İzmir Province, Turkey. Its population is 5,340 (2022). Due to its location on the Gulf of Gerence and near the İzmir Institute of Technology, the village is greatly expanding. The old village is surrounded by vacation homes for İzmir residents. The old route of the D.505 passes through the village, connecting to the D.300 just south of the village. The name of the village means "rose garden" (Turkish: gül, "rose," + bahçe, "garden").
