= Bademler =

- Neighbourhood
- Location within Turkey Location within İzmir
- Coordinates: 38°16′N 26°50′E
- Country: Turkey
- Province: İzmir
- District: Urla
- Elevation: 70 m (230 ft)
- Population (2022): 2,196
- Time zone: UTC+3 (TRT)
- Postal code: 35432
- Area code: 0232

Bademler is a neighbourhood in the municipality and district of Urla, İzmir Province, Turkey. Its population is 2,196 (2022).

== Geography ==
Bademler is situated in the midpoint of the Urla Peninsula. The distance to Urla is 9 kilometres (5.6 mi) and to İzmir 35 kilometres (22 mi).

== History ==
The village was founded in the first half of the 19th century. The Ottoman government forced nomadic Tahtacı Turkmen tribes to settle. The name Bademler means "almonds" and refers to almond trees that grew on the site of the village before settlement.

== Trivia ==
The Turkish film Dry Summer (Turkish: Susuz Yaz), winner of the Golden Bear at the 14th Berlin International Film Festival, was shot in Bademler.
