= Nohutalan =

Village in Urla district, Turkey

Nohutalan is a village (officially a neighborhood) in the Urla district of Izmir province, Turkey. Its population in 2018 was 150.

== Name ==
The name of the village means “chickpea area” (Turkish: nohut + alan).

The village is listed as Nohoudalani or نخود آلانى in a government list from 1928 and as Nohutalanı in 1935.

The village is listed Ροβιθόκαμπος (Rovithokampos; Greek: ροβίθι, "chickpea" + καμπος, "plain") or Νεούνταλάνι (Neoudalani) in various Greek sources.

== History ==
The village was populated by Greeks until the 1923 Population Exchange, when the Greeks of the village were sent to Greece. In 1940, the village was repopulated with descendants of Bosnian immigrants.

== Geography ==
The village is located in the western part of Urla district, on a plateau of hard rocky ground overlooking agricultural plains. It is 29 km from the center of Urla municipality and 67 km from the center of Izmir.

The village features a square, a mosque, a fountain (no longer flowing), a school building (no longer in use), a playground, a festival area constructed by the municipality, and a church (abandoned).

The D.300 İzmir-Çeşme Highway runs south of the village. The village is also on the following routes developed by the Izmir Metropolitan Municipality:

- Germiyan-Nohutalan-Birgi-Barbaros walking route
- Zeytinler-Uzunkuyu-Nohutalan-Germiyan olive route
- Efes-Mimas bicycle route

== Products ==
Nohutalan is known for its melons, of which it produces 5000 tons per year. The melons of the area are usually grown without irrigation, and when stored properly, by hanging, can keep fresh for six months or more. Thus they are known as "waterless melons" (susuz kavun) or "hanging melons" (askı kavunu).

Chickpeas are also grown.
