= Georgios Afthonidis =

Member of the Greek organization the Society of Friends

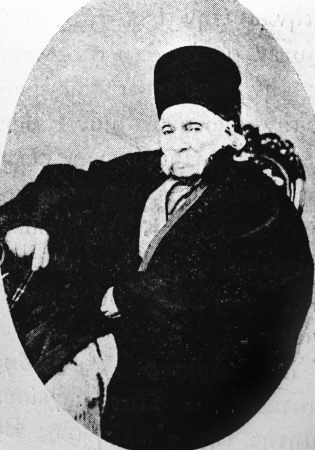
Afthonidis in the mid 19th century

Georgios Afthonidis (Greek: Γεώργιος Αφθονίδης; romanized: Geórgios Afthonídis) was a Greek member of the Filiki Eteria and "Grand secretary and Protoekdicus" of the Ecumenical Patriarchate of Constantinople.

== Biography ==
He was born in 1789 in Vourla, then Ottoman Empire (now Urla, Turkey). He joined the Filiki Eteria in 1819 after an invitation from Emmanuil Xanthos himself, one of the founders of it. He soon became one of its most trusted and prominent members. It was used in the interconnection of the Society with the Patriarchate, so that Patriarch Gregory V could take actions that served the Greek Revolution. Afthonidis was the person who many times wrote the says of Gregory and was responsible to transfer them to the recipients. One of the letters was asking the Maniots to collect money for the up coming Revolution. He dealt mainly with the financial part of the Filiki Eteria, collecting the donations of the Greeks of the diaspora. He was banished to Tokat by the Ottomans when the Revolution began. He returned to Constantinople in 1832 and worked at the Ecumenical Patriarchate. When the Greek state was recognised, after a bit of time, he moved to Athens where he died in 1867.
