= Karantina Island =

Island in Turkey

Native name: Karantina Adası
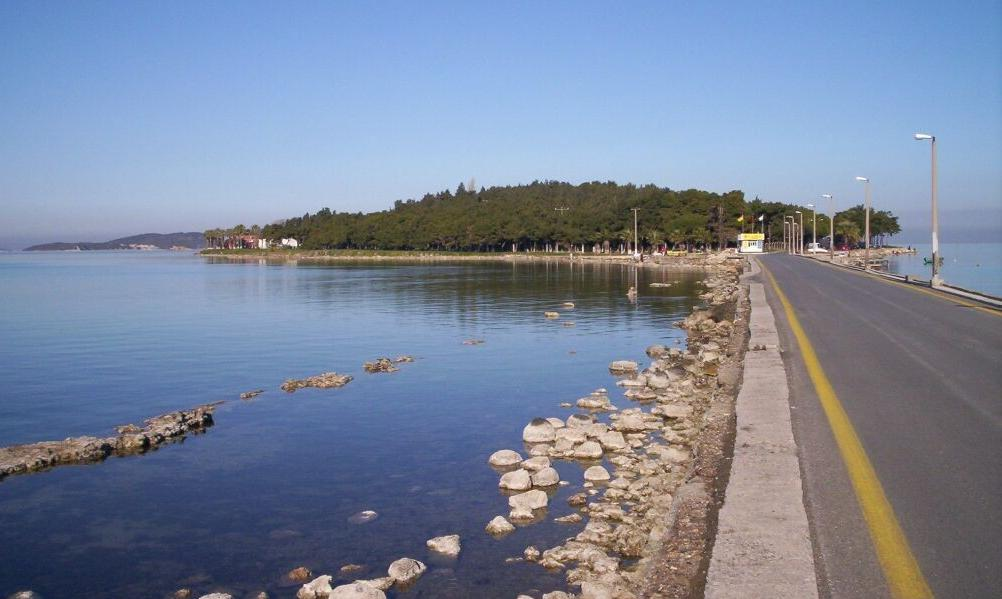
- Island from the south west

- Location within Turkey

Geography
- Location: Aegean Sea
- Coordinates: 38°22′26″N 26°47′07″E
- Area: 0.323 km^{2} (0.125 sq mi)

Administration
- Turkey
- İl (province): İzmir Province
- İlçe: Urla

Karantina Island (Turkish: Karantina Adası, literally 'Quarantine Island') is an island in the Gulf of İzmir, Turkey.

The island is a part of Urla ilçe (district) of İzmir Province. Its surface area is 320,000 square metres (3,400,000 sq ft) and its distance to mainland (Karaburun Peninsula of Anatolia) is only 600 metres (2,000 ft).There is an artificial connection between the mainland and the island. The ancient history of the island is related to that of the ancient site Klazomenai. During the 19th century the island was equipped with the up to date medical instruments and it was used as a quarantine island. In 1950, the buildings were restored to be used as a hospital. In 1955, its name was "Sun and Sea Treatment Institute". After the construction of new buildings it was renamed as "Urla Hospital of Orthopedics". In 1986, the hospital was redesigned as a general purpose hospital.

It is planned to open a medical museum on the island.

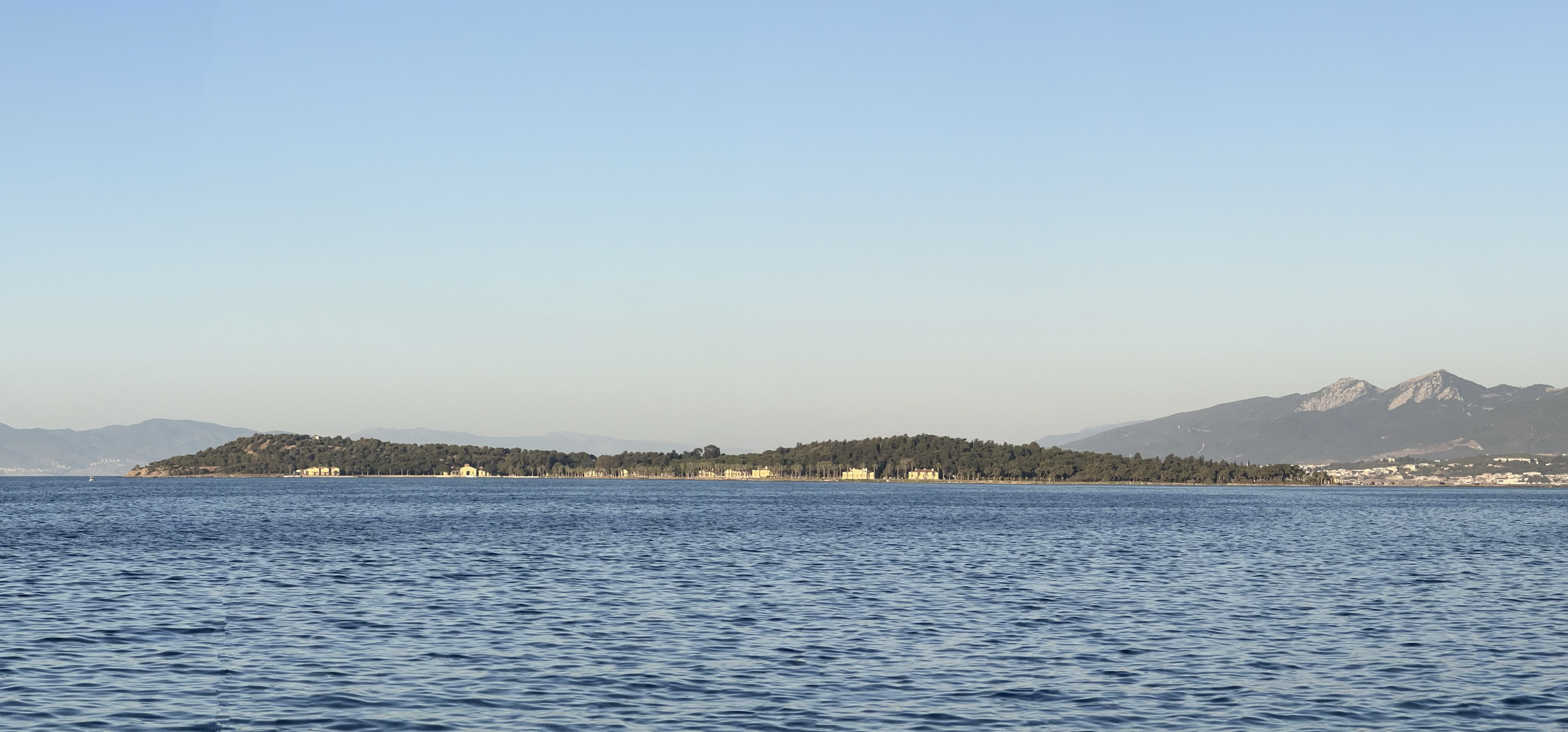
Karantina Island - Karantina Adası viewed from Denizli, Urla, İzmir
