= Kösedere, Karaburun =

Village

Coordinates: 38°32′49″N 26°33′09″E

Kösedere is a neighborhood in the municipality and district of Karaburun, İzmir Province, Turkey. Its population in 2023 was 498.

The village has also been known as Ağalarseki, with its name appearing in government records and on maps under several variations over the years:

- Kösedere (Ağlarseki) in census records from 1970, 1975, and 1980
- Kösedere (Ağalarseki) in census records from 1960 and 1965
- Ağalarseki (Kösedere) in 1945 census records
- Ağalarseki in 1940 census records
- Kösedere Seki on an early 20th-century Turkish map
- Saki on an early 20th-century German map
- Ağalar Sekisi in an 1891 vilayet salname
- Seki in a 1528 tahrir defter

(Note that the place on the Karaburun coast downhill from Kösedere that is now known as Kaynarpınar used to be called Kösedere İskelesi.)

The village is known for the Hurma variety of olives and for its local cuisine and is included in the İzmir Municipality's touristic Olive and Vineyard Routes.
