= Konak Ferry Terminal =

Passenger ferry terminal in central Konak, İzmir on the Gulf of İzmir

Konak Terminal
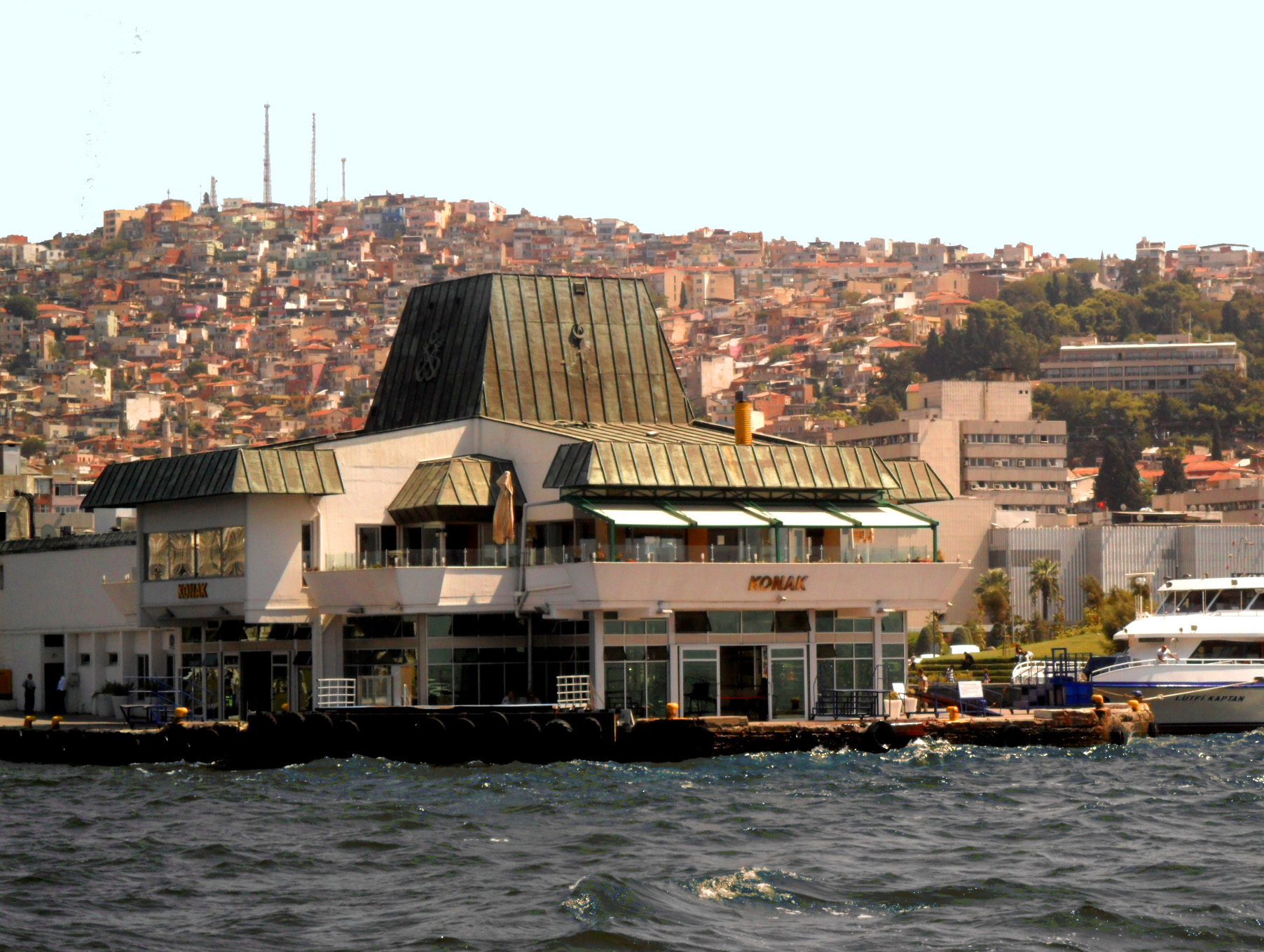
- Konak Terminal, with Kadifekale in the background.

General information
- Location: Konak İskelesi., Konak Mah., 35210; Konak, İzmir; Turkey
- Coordinates: 38.4186°N 27.1258°E
- Operator: İzdeniz
- Lines: Konak-Karşıyaka; Konak-Bostanlı
- Connections: İzmir Metro at Konak station Tram İzmir at Konak İskele; ESHOT Bus: Konak: 10, 72, 104, 105, 152, 171, 233, 285, 303, 304, 374, 465, 466, 471, 484, 485, 508, 887; Bahribaba: 15, 21, 27, 29, 30, 32, 33, 35, 121, 157, 193, 224, 253, 302, 550, 587, 588, 811, 910, 920, 930, 940, 950, 951; İskele: 35, 121, 202, 253, 302, 466, 910, 920, 930, 940, 950, 951; Belediye Sarayı: 18, 19, 20, 121, 202, 253, 302, 466, 811, 910, 920, 930, 940, 950

Construction
- Accessible: Yes

History
- Opened: 14 April 1938
- Rebuilt: 1980s
Location

Konak Ferry Terminal (Turkish: Konak İskelesi , or Konak Vapur İskelesi) to differentiate it from the older Konak Pier, is a passenger ferry terminal in central Konak, İzmir on the Gulf of İzmir. It is located at the west end of the Kent Tarihi Park, west of Konak Square and Mustafa Kemal Sahil Boulevard. İzdeniz operates commuter ferry service to destinations in Karşıyaka, Bayraklı, Balçova as well as within Konak. Transfer is available to the İzmir Metro at Konak station as well Tram İzmir service at Konak İskele tram station. There is also a transfer to ESHOT buses.

The original Konak Terminal was opened on 14 April 1938 and was located inland on Konak Square. The existing structure was built in the 1980s, when the city municipality redesigned Konak Square and constructed Mustafa Kemal Sahil Boulevard along a reclaimed coast.

== Overview ==
İzdeniz operates a ferry service to seven other terminals along the east İzmir bay. These terminals are: Karşıyaka, Pasaport, Alsancak, Bostanlı, Göztepe, Üçkuyular and Bayraklı. A total of 99 ferries depart and arrive at the terminal every weekday. The majority of these ferries operate to Karşıyaka with 52 daily. Weekends still see many ferries but not as much as on weekdays.

The terminal building itself has of two levels. The lower level is for passengers and consists of a waiting hall, ticket booths and turnstiles while the upper floor consists of a cafe and bakery. A coffee house and news kiosk are located outside, directly in front of the building.
