= Urla Artichoke Festival =

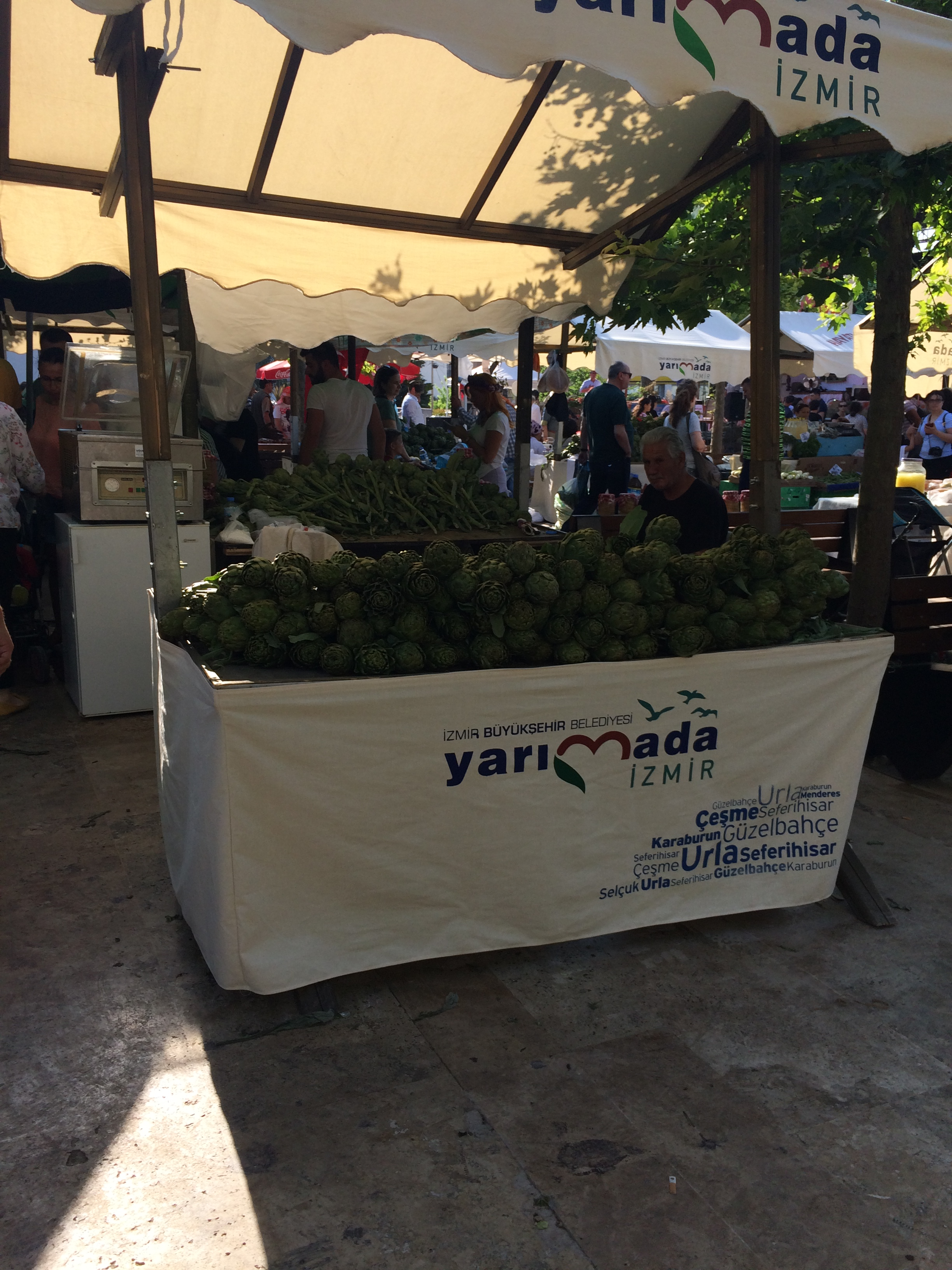
- Native name: Urla Enginar Festivali

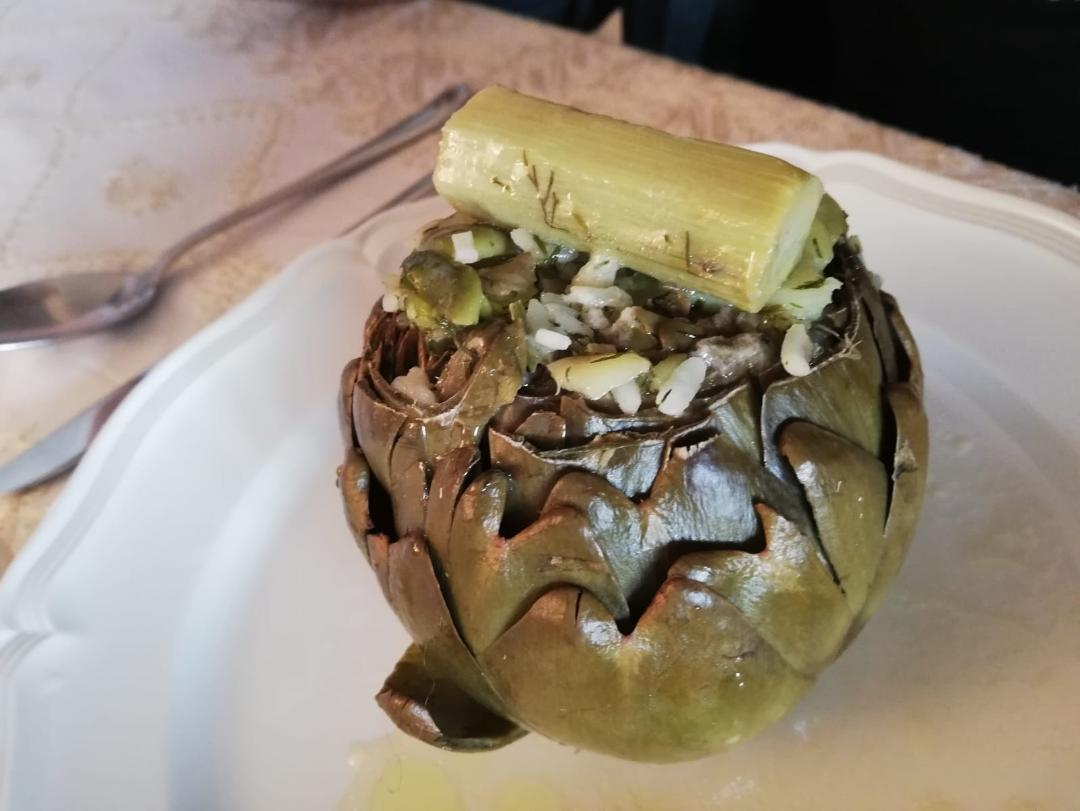
Famous food consumed at the festival

Urla Artichoke Festival, is a festival held every year in April to promote the cuisine of Urla. The festival is held in Urla Cumhuriyet Square. Producers sell artichokes, vegetables and fruits at the festival. In 2020, the Urla Artichoke Festival could not be held due to the Coronavirus. In 2023, the festival held in 28-29 and 30 April.
