= Naipli, Urla =

Neighborhood in Urla, Turkey

Naipli is a neighborhood in the Urla District, İzmir Province, Turkey. It is located to the southeast of the Urla city center and is one of the oldest neighborhoods in Urla. Its population is 369 (2025).

== History ==
In an Ottoman defter of 1530, Naipli (Naibli) is recorded as a neighborhood of Urla. At that time, Naipli included 40 households.

== Notable features ==
The neighborhood's Müselle (or Musalla) Mosque was built between the 14th and 16th centuries. It may be the oldest mosque in Urla. Its minaret in unusual, being a square platform covered with a spire, with a flight of stairs outside the minaret leading up to the platform. As of 2020, the mosque was in ruins. Next to the Müselle Mosque is a cemetery containing many graves, including that of a holy man (eren) said to be Memi Dede. Approximately 200 meters south of Müselle Mosque is a site where a Klazomenian sarcophagus was found.
