= Alsancak Ferry Terminal =

Ferry terminal in İzmir, Turkey

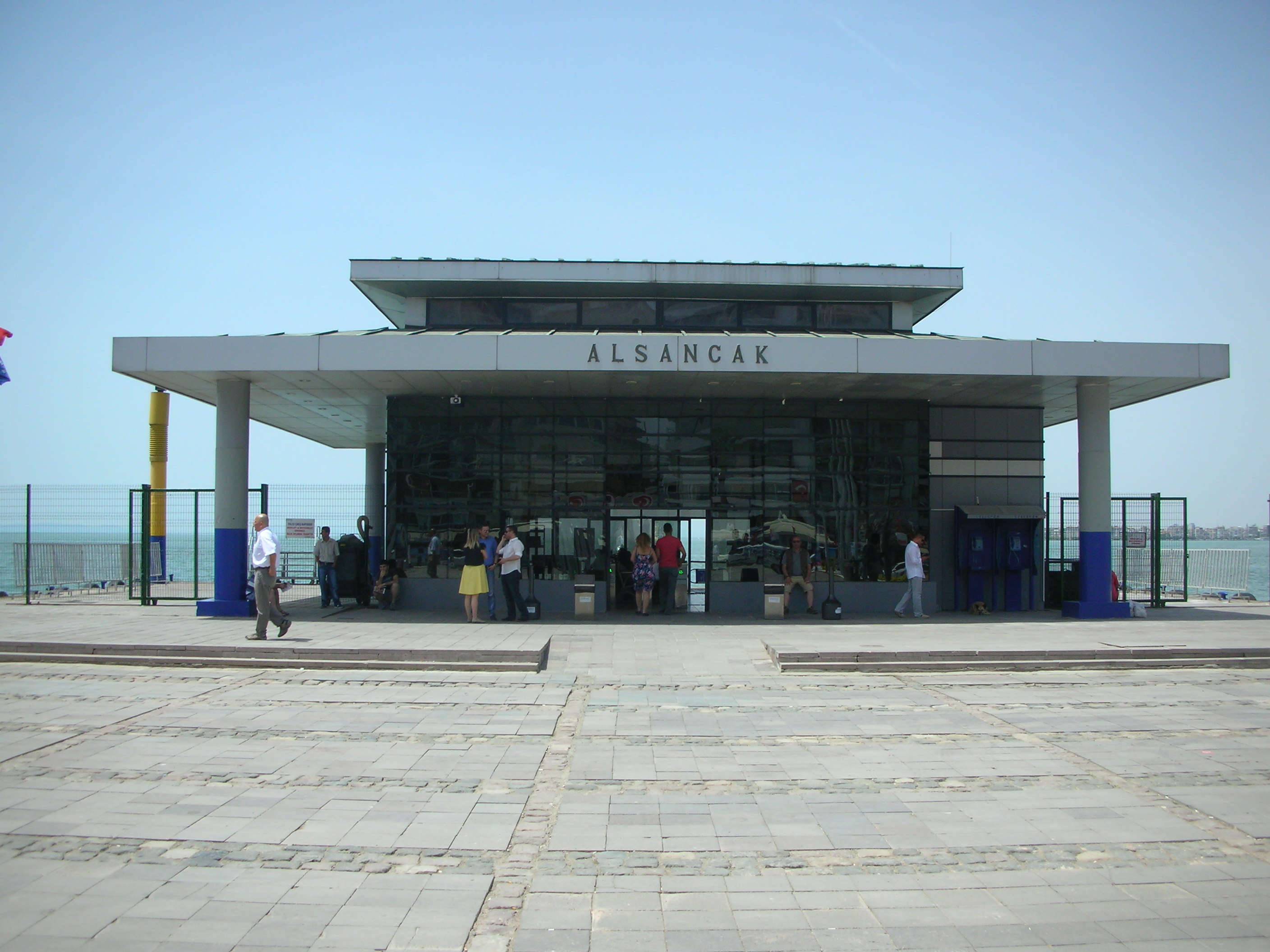

Alsancak Ferry Terminal is a ferry terminal in İzmir, Turkey that operates by İzdeniz. İzmir is located around the Gulf of İzmir and the intracity transport is carried mostly by ferries. Alsancak Ferry Terminal at is on the southern side of the gulf.
