= Özbek, Urla =

Village in Turkey

Özbek
- Neighbourhood
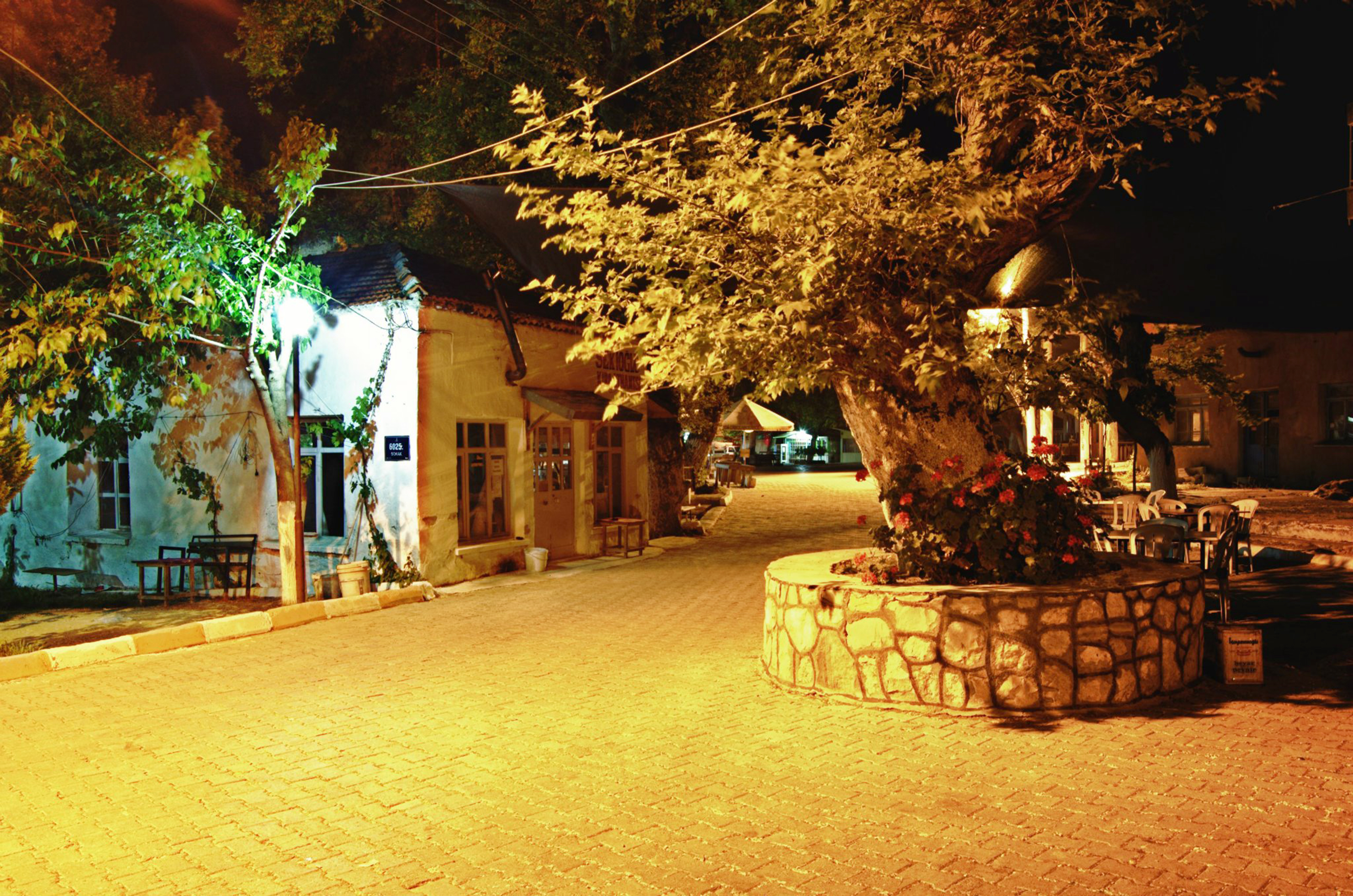

- Location within Turkey Location within İzmir
- Coordinates: 38°21′53″N 26°42′16″E
- Country: Turkey
- Province: İzmir
- District: Urla
- Population (2022): 1,617
- Time zone: UTC+3 (TRT)
- Area code: 0232

Özbek is a neighbourhood in the municipality and district of Urla, İzmir Province, Turkey. Its population is 1,617 (2022).

== Name ==
The name of the village means "Uzbek" (Turkish: Özbek). However, the name probably originates from a medieval male given name such as Uzbeg or Özbeg and not from the ethnic group.

== Mart Dokuzu Herb Festival ==
A video from the festival

Mart Dokuzu Herb Festival is a festival held every year in Özbek neighborhood of Urla district of İzmir. During the festival, the participants go up to the hills in Özbek and collect herbs that are beneficial for health. In addition, a bazaar is set up in the square of the neighborhood and the people living there sell what they produce in this bazaar. Also, cooking workshops are held in the neighborhood.
