= Büyük Ada =

Island in the Aegean Sea in Izmir Province, Turkey

Coordinates: 38°39′32″N 26°30′55″E

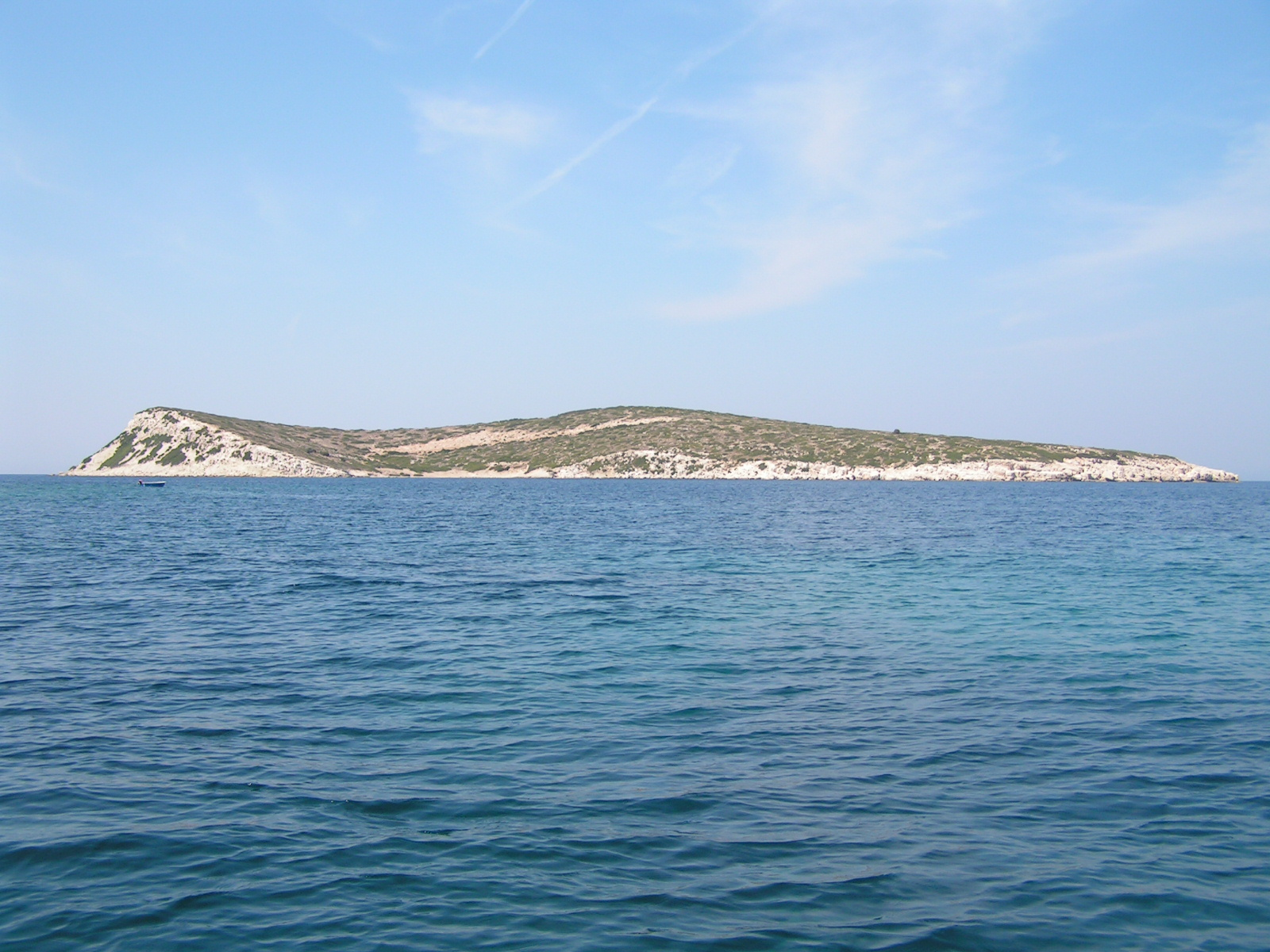
Büyük Ada in Karaburun, İzmir

Büyük Ada (literally for "Big Island" in Turkish, a.k.a. Sahip Island) is the largest island which can be seen from the town center of Karaburun town in İzmir, Turkey.
