= Pırnarlı Island =

Island in Turkey

Native name: Pırnalı Ada
- Location within Turkey

Geography
- Location: Aegean Sea
- Coordinates: 38°23′51″N 26°47′12″E

Administration
- Turkey
- İl (province): İzmir Province
- İlçe: Urla

Pırnarlı Island (Turkish: Pırnarlı Ada, also called Pınarlı Ada) is an island in İzmir Gulf of Turkey. It is one of a group of 12 islands in the gulf. The name of the island refers to the plant Holly (Turkish: pırnar) which is plentiful in the island. But the island is popularly called Pınarlı which means "with springs"

The island faces Urla ilçe (district) at 38°23′51″N 26°47′12″E. The total area of the island is about 0.25 square kilometres (0.097 sq mi).Its distance to coast is about 2.5 kilometres (1.6 mi).
