= Karşıyaka Ferry Terminal =

Karşıyaka Terminal
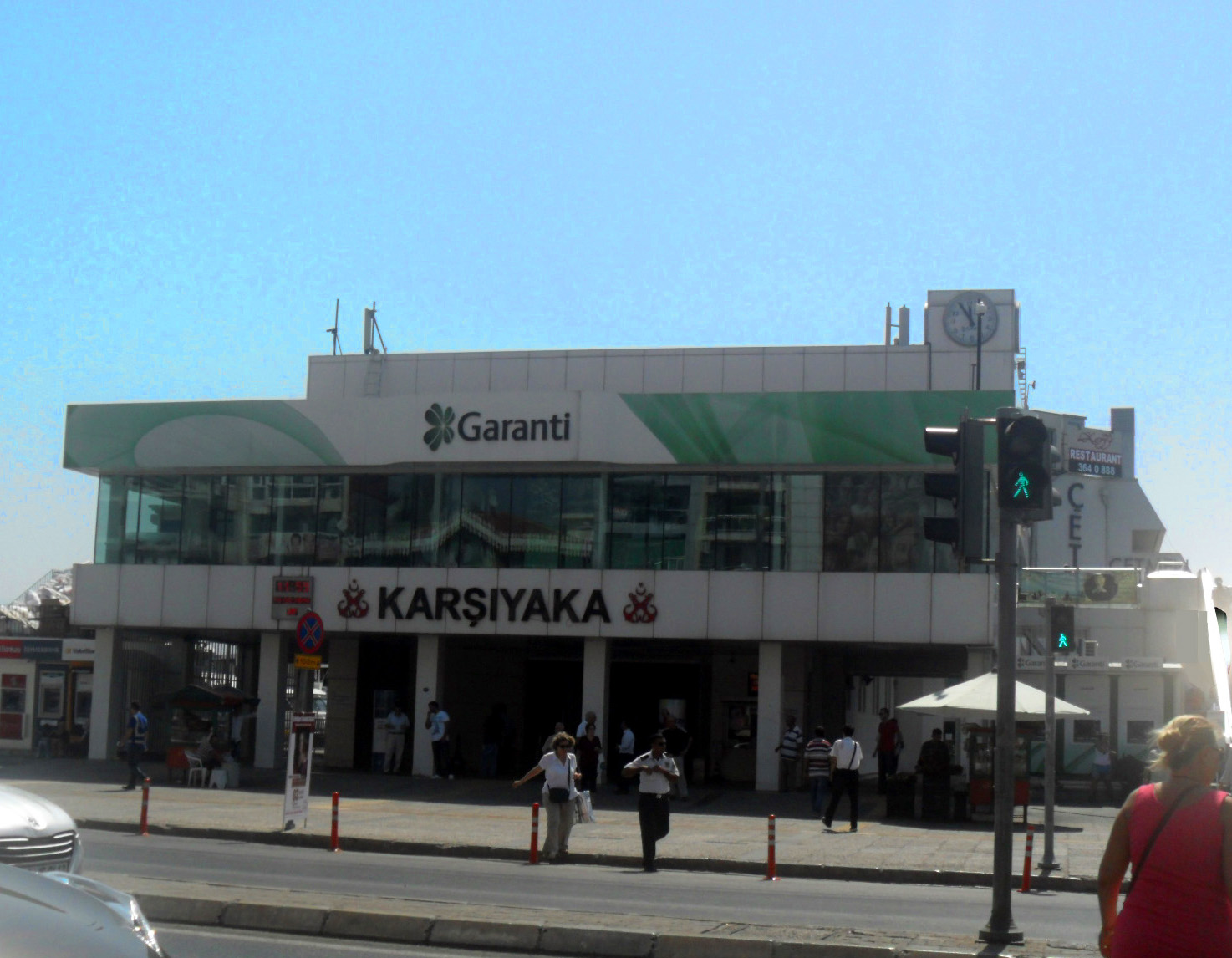
- Street side of the terminal building.

General information
- Location: Cemal Gürsel Cd., Tuna Mah., 35600; Karşıyaka, İzmir; Turkey
- Coordinates: 38.4550°N 27.1203°E
- Operator: İzdeniz
- Lines: Alsancak-Karşıyaka; Alsancak-Bostanlı; Konak-Karşıyaka; Karşıyaka-Göztepe; Pasaport-Karşıyaka; Pasaport-Bostanlı
- Connections: Tram İzmir at Karşıyaka İskele; ESHOT Bus: 121, 126, 135, 136, 137, 196, 197, 200, 222, 258, 290, 326, 330, 361, 487, 543, 741, 742, 777, 847, 853, 920

Construction
- Accessible: Yes

History
- Opened: 1884
Location

Karşıyaka Ferry Terminal (Turkish: Karşıyaka İskelesi) is ferry terminal in Karşıyaka, İzmir on the Gulf of İzmir. Located along Cemal Gürsel Avenue, at the southern end of the Karşıyaka Çarşı, İzdeniz operates commuter ferry to service to Alsancak, Konak, Göztepe and Üçkuyular.

Karşıyaka Terminal was originally built in 1884, and promoted the growth of Karşıyaka's population. The existing terminal building was built in the 1940s-1950s.

== History ==
In the 19th century the present location of Karşıyaka was a marsh land because of the Gediz River Delta. The settlements began after the course of the river was changed by the government. Thus Karşıyaka is a relatively new quarter of izmir. According to salname (annual) of Aydın in 1897, the population of Karşıyaka during the last years of 19th century was as low as about 1000. The rapid increase in population was the result of the beginning of commuter boats services. The first Karşıyaka Terminal was a wooden terminal constructed in 1884 by a ferry company, Hamidiye. As the population increased, a new terminal was constructed and the number of ferry services also increased.

After many handovers in 1992, Karşıyaka Terminal was acquired by İzdeniz, a subsidiary of İzmir Municipality.

== Future ==
The present terminal building is under serious critics. The municipality of Karşıyaka now plans to construct a smaller modern terminal in its place.
