= Karaburun =

- District and municipality
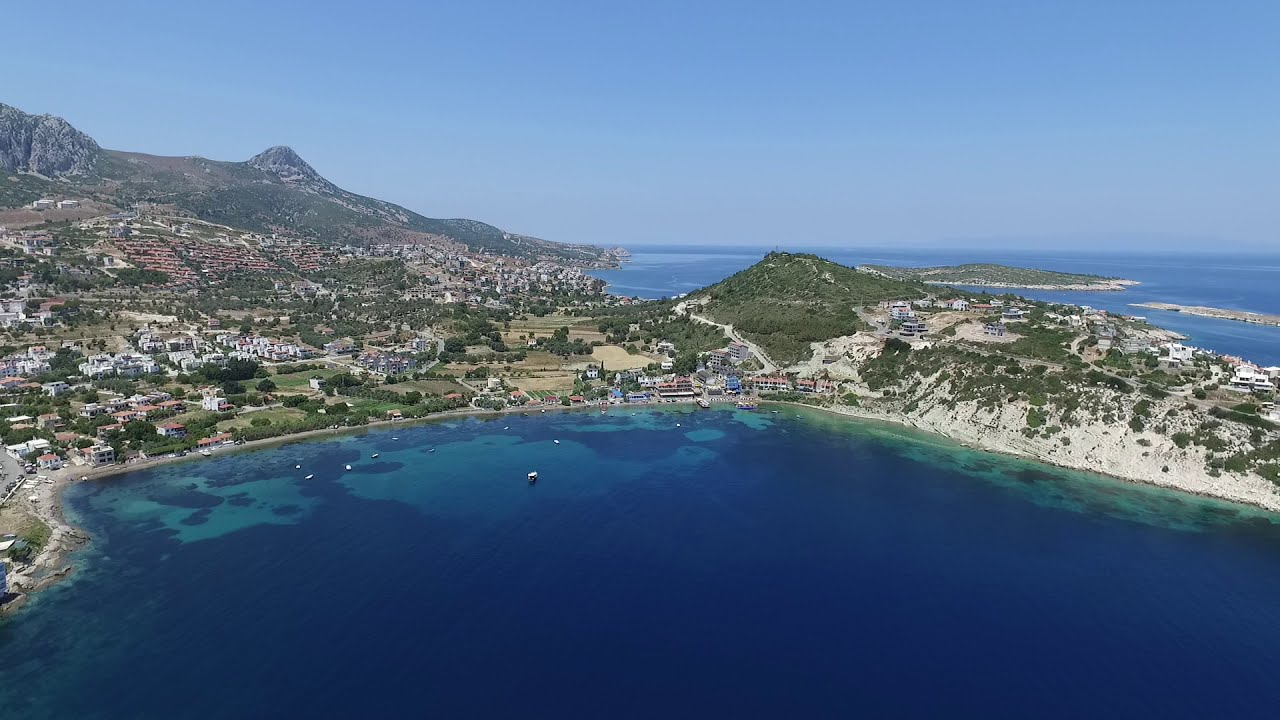
- Aerial view of Karaburun town from the sea

- Map showing Karaburun District in İzmir Province

- Location within Turkey Location within İzmir
- Coordinates: 38°38′N 26°31′E
- Country: Turkey
- Province: İzmir

Government
  - Mayor: İlkay Girgin Erdoğan (New Party)
- Area: 421 km^{2} (163 sq mi)
- Elevation: 50 m (160 ft)
- Population (2022): 12,200
  - Density: 29.0/km^{2} (75.1/sq mi)
- Time zone: UTC+3 (TRT)
- Area code: 0232
- Website: www.karaburun.bel.tr

Karaburun is a municipality and district of İzmir Province, in western Turkey. Its area is 421 km^{2}, and its population is 12,200 (2022). The district area roughly corresponds to the peninsula of the same name (Karaburun Peninsula) which spears north of the tourism resorts of neighboring Çeşme and its dependencies and west of the city of İzmir. In fact, the district area is one of the westernmost points of Anatolia. Karaburun town is situated close to the northern tip of the peninsula and checks the entry of the Gulf of İzmir with the town of Foça, another important tourism resort, across the waters. The district's administrative zone is bordered by the districts of Çeşme and Urla to the south and faces the Greek island of Chios to the west.

The Karaburun region is comparatively much less visited than Çeşme located in its south, its rate of urbanization at 20 per cent is the lowest across İzmir Province, although it provides an anticlimax to its southern neighbor and the associated attractions especially for those who want to escape the trails of mass tourism. The coasts of the peninsula have beautiful bays and pebble or sand beaches, many as yet largely undiscovered by outsiders, although there is one German vacation village slightly to the north of the district center. Taken as a whole, in contrast with Çeşme, agriculture, fishing and livestock breeding, instead of tourism, remain the principal drivers of the district's economy. Karaburun's flora and fauna present particularities distinguishing it from the Anatolian mainland. Karaburun's name echoes in Turkey a very high variety of flower breeds present across its area, and especially narcissus and hyacinth.

== Main features ==
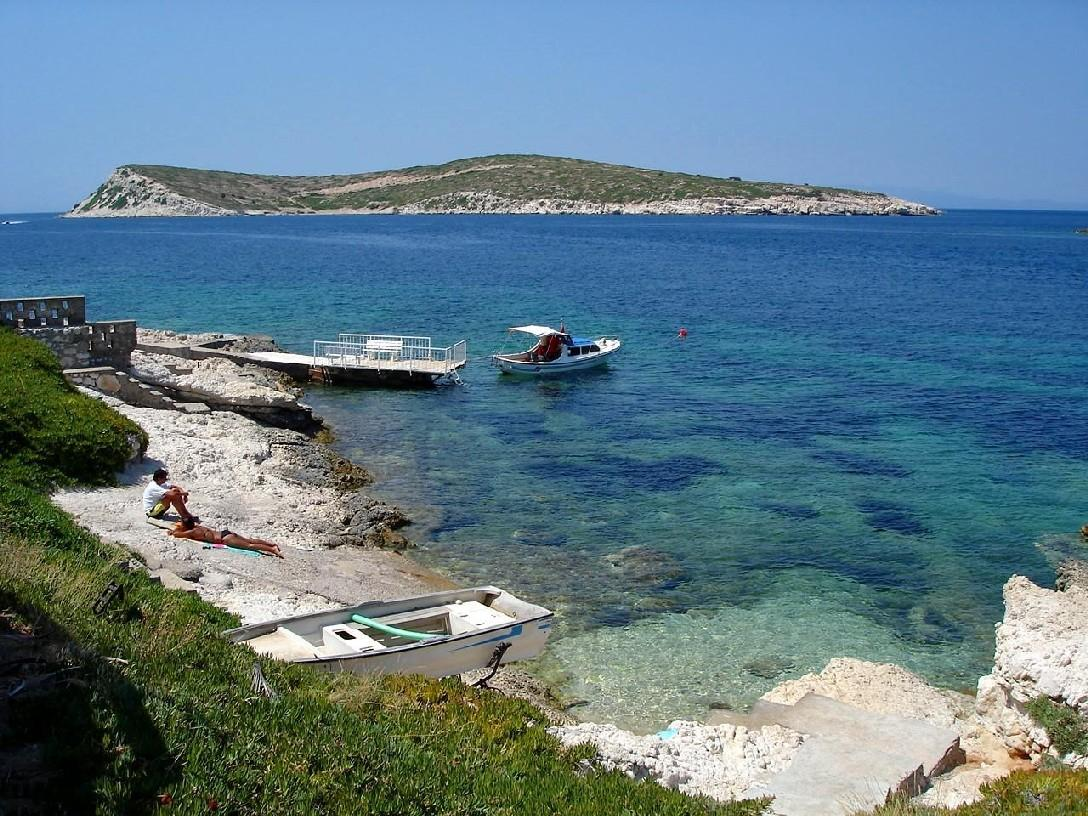
Sahip Island (Büyük Ada) demarcates the small bay of Karaburun, the center town of the district with some of the purest beaches across Turkey

The distance between Karaburun and İzmir center by way of land is 100 km (approximately 60 miles) and there are regular bus services and a three-lane modern highway until the toll near Çeşme. The rest of the road is narrow and curvy in some places and it may take up to two hours to reach Karaburun from İzmir. The country road is traced northwards along the eastern coast of the peninsula to reach Mordoğan first, which is, aside from Karaburun, the district's only other depending township with own municipality. After Karaburun, the same road continues towards the tip of the peninsula from where it heads west to reach the village of Küçükbahçe.

== History ==
The oldest name known for the region was Mimas, in reference to the son of Gaia who was one of the Giants slain by Hephaistos during the war between Gods and Giants in Greek mythology. Homer mentions the "windy Mimas" mountain (present-day Bozdağ) in his Odyssey. The Mimas mountain is also associated with Iris, Leto and Narcissus. In Ionian through to Byzantine times, the region also carried the names Stelar or Stylarius, Caleberno by the Genoese and Ahırlı during the Ottoman era. There are different possibilities for the name Karaburun. One that is mentioned in the municipality web site is that it would be a modified form of Caleberno. Another possibility may have to do with the very translation of the Turkish name, which means "black cape", a fitting description especially for sailors who approach Karaburun Peninsula from open sea.

The region is rich in history although its only sizeable urban center from ancient Greek, Byzantine through to Ottoman times was in Erythrai. Today the village of Ildırı stands in the ancient town's location and the village is in Çeşme. Traces of smaller settlements can also be traced back to the Bronze Age.

Karaburun is the most recently constituted district of İzmir, although the town of Karaburun was made into a municipality already in 1902. From 1867 until 1922, Karaburun was part of Aidin Vilayet.

According to the 1914 Ottoman population statistics, the district of Karaburun had a total population of 18,772, consisting of 9,934 Greeks and 8,838 Muslims.

== Economy ==
Agriculture, fishing and livestock breeding remain the principal activities on which Karaburun's economy is based. The average yearly income level per inhabitant for the district was calculated at 3,673 US Dollars in 2007. Karaburun's trade relations with the outside world abroad remain modest, with total exports recorded as 26,319 US Dollars realized in 2007, mostly flowers, with also some exports of olives and olive oil and artichokes. Underground reserves include marble quarries, deposits of basalt, slate for constructions and clay for ceramics. Mercury was also mined in the past. The district's total number of companies stood at 525 the same year. There was only one bank operating through one branch in Karaburun in 2007.

The total number of residences in Karaburun district was counted as 8,912, an important part constituted by secondary residences owned by seasonal inhabitants. The total accommodation capacity of the district is 982 beds, in which the depending municipality of Mordoğan has a sizable share. The level of literacy in Karaburun nears hundred per cent, and the district is advantaged by the rather comfortable number of students, 12 in 2007, per teacher. There was one doctor for 1,447 patients in Karaburun in 2007.

== Other information ==
Nearer to Karaburun is the abandoned village of Sazak whose inhabitants were subject to the 1923 Population exchange between Greece and Turkey in the frame of the Treaty of Lausanne. Sazak today is a ghost town rarely visited by tourists from Karaburun.

The district is less active during winter when the population of Karaburun center falls back to the usual 2,500, with the owners of summer houses gone. Nevertheless, its gorges and heights make the peninsula a popular destination for trekkers.

There has been talk for many years about starting ferry services from İzmir to these two centers of the peninsula, which would allow visitors to avoid the difficult end-portion of the land route, but the project meets the opposition of the dolmuş lobby.

== Composition ==
There are 16 neighbourhoods in Karaburun District:

- Ambarseki
- Bozköy
- Eğlenhoca
- Hasseki
- İnecik
- İskele
- Kösedere
- Küçükbahçe
- Merkez
- Mordoğan
- Parlak
- Saip
- Salman
- Sarpıncık
- Tepeboz
- Yaylaköy

== See also ==
- September 2006 Karaburun, Turkey migrant boat disaster
