= İZDENİZ =

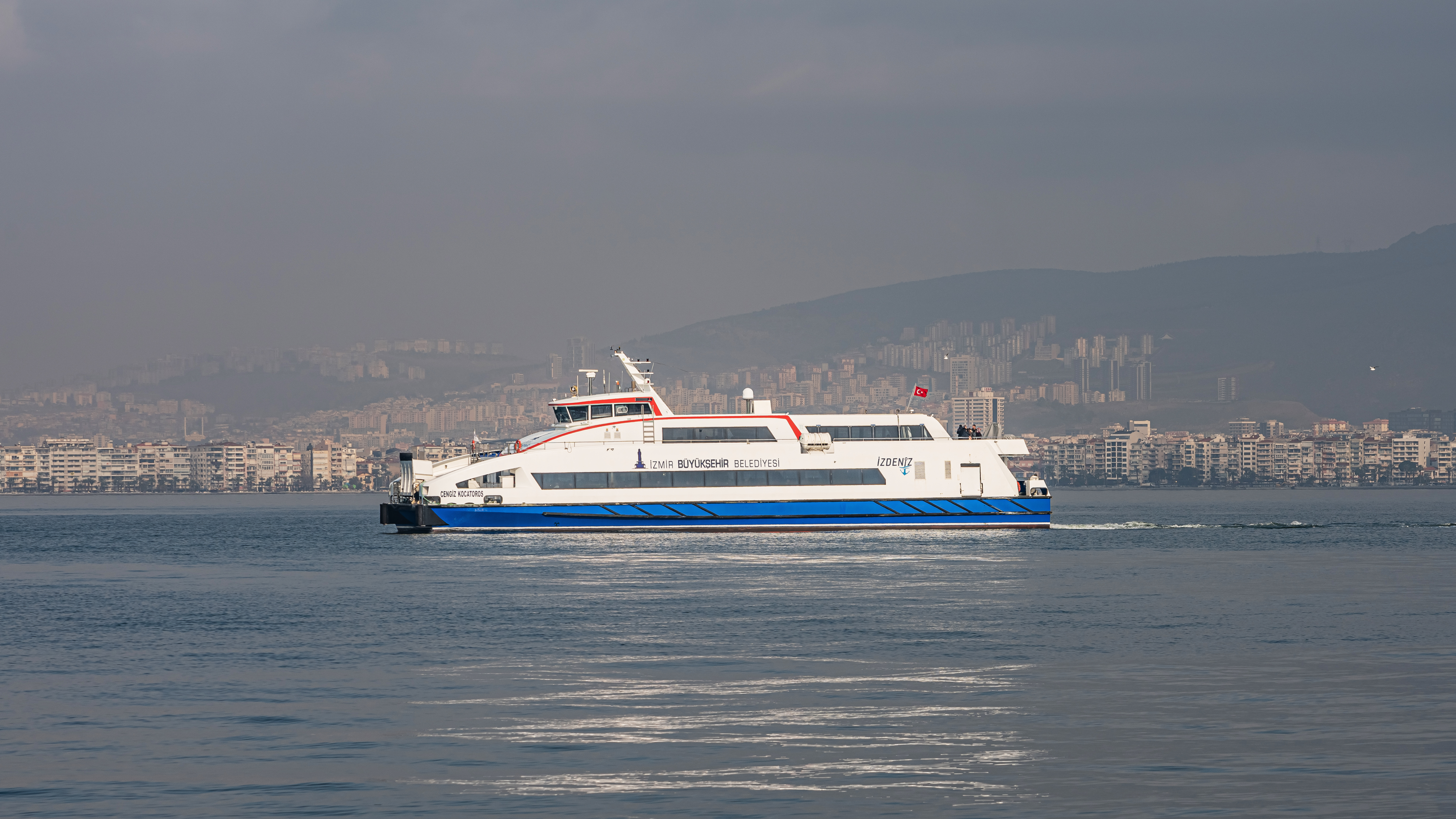
An İzdeniz ferry

İzdeniz is a municipality company which is responsible in short distance sea transport and ferry terminals within the Gulf of İzmir, Turkey. ( İz is the first syllable of the name İzmir and -deniz means sea.)

== History ==
The company was established in 1992 as a subsidiary of İzmir Municipality. In 1999, it was renamed as İzdeniz. In 2000, 104 staff members as well as 11 ferries (8 for the passengers and 3 for the vehicles) were handed over to İzdeniz from the TDİ (Turkish Sea Enterprise, a governmental company) which was responsible in ferry communication in the Gulf of İzmir up to 2000. After 2000 three ferries went out of service.

== Services ==
At the moment, the company has 13 ferries (10 for the passengers and three for the vehicles.) An additional 13 ferries were rented, and the total size of the fleet is 26. The total number of daily scheduled cruises is 210 between 9 terminals. The total number of daily passengers is over 50,000 and the vessels is over 1,500.

== Terminals ==
The terminals are the following:

- Alsancak
- Bostanlı
- Göztepe
- Güzelbahçe
- Karantina
- Karşıyaka
- Konak
- Pasaport
- Üçkuyular
