= Gulf of İzmir =

Gulf on the Aegean Sea

- İzmir körfezi (Turkish)
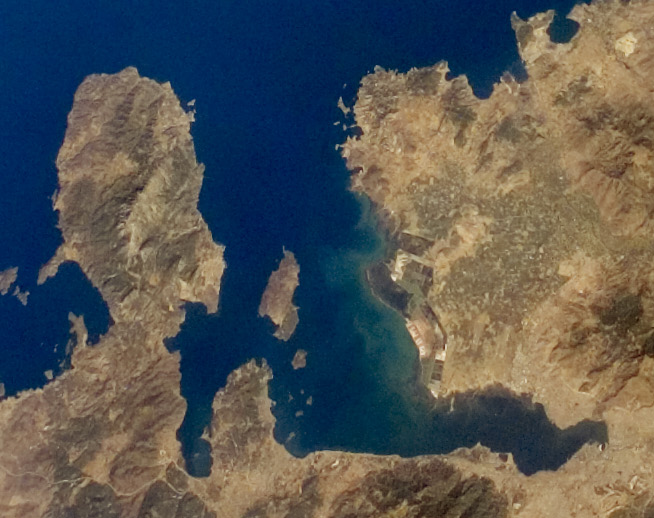
- The Gulf of İzmir as seen from the International Space Station

- Location within Turkey
- Location: İzmir Province, Turkey
- Coordinates: 38°29′N 26°49′E
- Type: Gulf
- Etymology: İzmir
- River sources: Gediz; Meles
- Ocean/sea sources: Aegean Sea
- Basin countries: Turkey
- Max. length: 64 km (40 mi)
- Max. width: 32 km (20 mi)
- Surface area: 960.4 km^{2} (370.8 sq mi)
- Max. depth: 100 m (330 ft)
- Shore length^{1}: 464 km (288 mi)
- Surface elevation: 0 m (0 ft)
- Islands: Uzunada; Hekim Island; Foça Islands; Çiçek Islands; Karantina Island; Yılan Island; Büyük Ada
- Sections/sub-basins: Gülbahçe Bay
- Settlements: İzmir; Foça; Karaburun; Menemen; Urla
- ^{1} Shore length is not a well-defined measure.

The Gulf of İzmir (Turkish: İzmir körfezi), formerly known as the Gulf of Smyrna, is a gulf on the Aegean Sea, with its inlet between the Karaburun Peninsula and the mainland area of Foça. It is 64 kilometres (40 mi) in length by 32 kilometres (20 mi) in breadth, with an excellent anchorage. The city of İzmir, an important port city of Turkey, surrounds the end of the gulf.

== Geography ==
The northern limit of the Gulf of İzmir is defined as a 13 nmi line running from Cape Kanlıkaya (38°40′29″N 26°28′23″E) of the Karaburun Peninsula, to Cape Aslan (38°44′29″N 26°44′24″E) of Foça. The surface area of the gulf is 960.4 km^{2} (370.8 sq mi), while its shore length is 464 km (288 mi).

Uzunada located in the Gulf of İzmir is Turkey's fourth largest island. Other islands of the gulf include Hekim Island, Foça Islands (Orak Island, Fener Ada, Incir Ada, Metelik Island), Çiçek Islands (Yassıca Island, Pırnarlı Island, İncirli Island, Akça), Karantina Island, Yılan Island, and Büyük Ada.

Seventeen rivers empty into the gulf, most notably the Gediz and the Meles. Gediz Delta, which is a Ramsar site, is located in the northeast of the gulf.

Levent Marina is the only marina located in the gulf.

== Geology ==
The Gulf of İzmir was formed during the Quaternary geological period. The east-west direction pit of the gulf was formed as a result of breaking the faults.

== Flora and fauna ==
The northeastern coast of the gulf is the habitat of the Mediterranean monk seal. İzmir Birds Paradise in the north of the gulf and Çakalburnu Lagoon in the south are the breeding ground of the birds.

== History ==
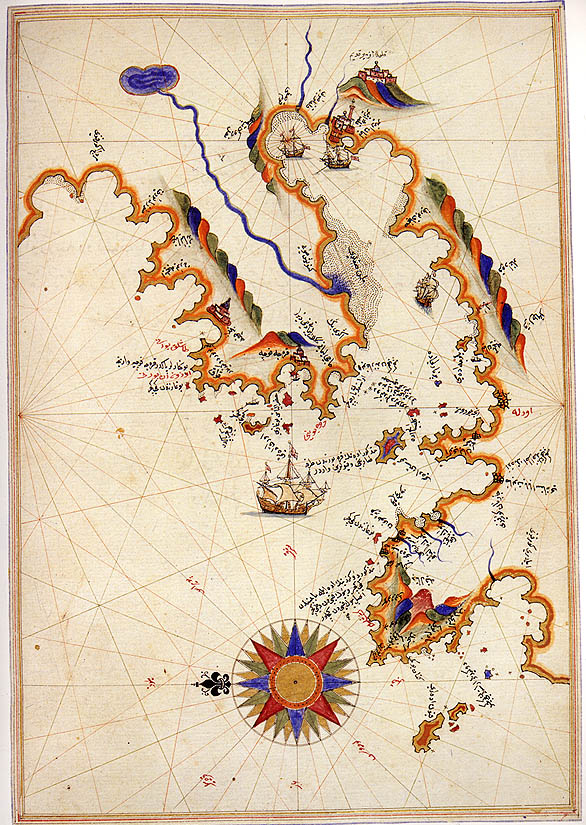
Map of the gulf by Piri Reis

It is known that the first settlements around the gulf were in the Neolithic Age. The most known settlement is Smyrna, which was established around present-day Bayraklı in 3300s BC. Timur, who came to İzmir after the Battle of Ankara, seized İzmir Port Castle and its surroundings in December 1402 and ordered the destruction of the castle. During the First World War, naval battles occurred between Sancakburnu Castle and Urla in March 1915 and around Uzunada in May 1916.

== Economy ==
Port of İzmir is a cargo and passenger port located to the east of the gulf. It is the seventh largest port of the country in terms of container volume and thirteenth in terms of cargo tonnage.

There are nine active passenger ferry quays in the gulf. The İZKARAY project, which envisages the joining of the two sides of the gulf with a bridge, an artificial island and a tunnel, will provide road and rail connections between Balçova and Çiğli districts.

== Shipwrecks ==
There are five known shipwrecks in the Gulf of İzmir. At a depth of 16.4 meters off the Sancakburnu Castle, there are wrecks of two ships, one of which is 118 meters and the other is 86 meters long, which crashed into each other in 1957. There is another shipwreck located off Güzelbahçe at a depth of 42 meters, which was discovered at the beginning of 2017, thought to be a 78 meters long cargo ship that sank in the late 1800s. It is also stated that one to four ships were sunk in the gulf during the First World War. Dozens of shipwrecks off the Sancakburnu Castle were removed from the sea in 1967 and in the following years.

== Pollution ==
In the period when 200,000 people lived around the gulf, the discharge of wastewater into the gulf did not cause any obvious problems. However, with the population exceeding 500,000 and industrialization, waste that has exceeded the capacity of the gulf to renew itself has begun to be discharged into the gulf. In this period, pollution became noticeable and the people could no longer swim in the gulf. With the population exceeding 1.7 million in the 1990s, the level of pollution has risen a lot and heavy metal traces were found in fish. In 1992, the treatment and sewage system, called the Grand Canal Project, started to be built by İZSU. Launched in October 2002, the system prevented waste water discharge to the gulf. By the 2010s, it was observed that the pollution in the gulf was removed and the marine life returned to normal. With the Gulf of İzmir Oceanographic Monitoring Project carried out by İZSU since 2000, the cleaning of the gulf is tracked.

== Leisure ==
Sailing is supported by Karşıyaka S.K. and Göztepe S.K. in the inner gulf. Yacht, sailing, canoe, rowing and dragon boat races are held in the gulf with the İzmir Gulf Festival, which is organized annually since 2017. The gulf hosts the İnciraltı Sea Museum and the Zübeyde Hanım Education and Museum Ship. There are nine Blue Flag beaches around the gulf (four in Foça, three in Karaburun, one in Güzelbahçe and one in Urla). There is a ban on diving in twelve points in the gulf to protect cultural and natural heritage.
