= Urla, İzmir =

Urla
- District and municipality
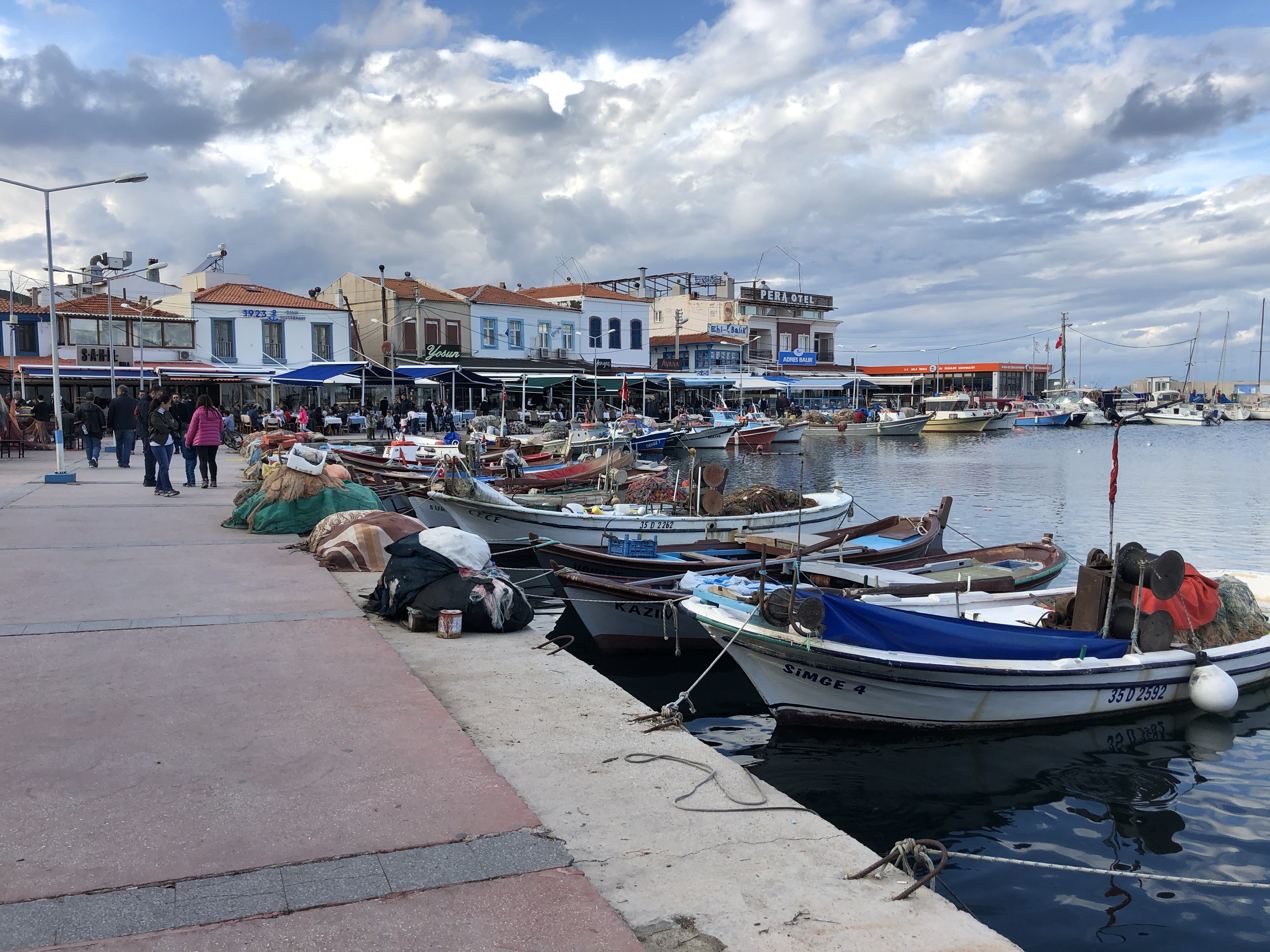

- Map showing Urla District in İzmir Province

- Location within Turkey Location within İzmir
- Coordinates: 38°19′20″N 26°45′53″E
- Country: Turkey
- Province: İzmir

Government
  - Mayor: Selçuk Balkan (CHP)
- Area: 727 km^{2} (281 sq mi)
- Population (2022): 74,736
  - Density: 103/km^{2} (266/sq mi)
- Time zone: UTC+3 (TRT)
- Area code: 0232
- Website: www.urla.bel.tr

Urla is a municipality and district of İzmir Province, in western Turkey. Its area is 727 km^{2}, and its population is 74,736 (2022). Agricultural products, and especially the fresh produce for the vast nearby market of İzmir, occupy a prominent place in Urla's economy, with fish, poultry and flowers standing out. The annual international Artichoke Festival has been celebrated here since 2015.

The name "Urla" is derived from the Greek Βουρλά ("Vourla") meaning marshlands and the town was cited as such in western sources until the 20th century. Bryela (Byzantine name, meaning Woman of God i.e. Holy Maria) whereas it has been suggested that due to the transposition of vowels, Bryela has become Vourla, meaning marshlands. Urla is the location of the ancient city of Klazomenai whose remains are much visited, and whose name lives on in the unofficial appellation used in the region for part of the coastline of the district, "Kilizman" which is a still-used derivative of Klazomenai. (Former name of Güzelbahçe). With literacy among the highest in Turkey at 97%, Urla is also home to İzmir Institute of Technology. Urla prides itself for having raised two important men of letters, Giorgos Seferis and Necati Cumalı.

== Geography ==
The district center is located in the middle of the isthmus of a small peninsula which protrudes northwards in the Gulf of İzmir, but its urban tissue is comparatively loose and extends eastwards to touch the coast and to cover a wide area which also includes a large portion of the peninsula. Sizable parts in the municipal area, owned by absentee landlords, remain uninhabited or are very rural in aspect. The peninsular coastline present a number of compounds constituted by seasonal residences along the beaches and the coves and which are administratively divided between Urla center's municipal area or its depending villages.

Urla district area's eastern end neighbors the westernmost district of the Greater Metropolitan Area of İzmir, Güzelbahçe, and urbanization is much denser across that part, contributing to the whole district's average urbanization rate of 75%. With İzmir center (Konak) at a distance of only 35 km (22 mi), an important part of Urla's population is composed of residents, often wealthy, who commute to the big city every day, access to and from İzmir and Çeşme, an international center of tourism at a distance of 45 km (28 mi) from Urla, having been greatly facilitated by the building of a six-lane highway. Urla district nevertheless manages to preserve an overall outlook of a pleasant suburb and resort, and as it extends to the west along Karaburun Peninsula, where it borders on the districts of Çeşme and Karaburun, secondary residences built along the coast or large farms of the interior, as well as native villages, all bearing typical Aegean characteristics, increase in number. To the south, Urla district neighbors that of Seferihisar and the settlement pattern is thinner in that section, with even some empty land, although housing projects targeting İzmir's professional classes start to show a rising interest for that section as well.

== Composition ==
There are 37 neighbourhoods in Urla District:

- Altıntaş
- Atatürk
- Bademler
- Balıklıova
- Barbaros
- Birgi
- Camiatik
- Çamlıçay
- Demircili
- Denizli
- Gülbahçe
- Güvendik
- Hacıisa
- İçmeler
- İskele
- Kadıovacık
- Kalabak
- Kuşçular
- M.Fevzi Çakmak
- Naipli
- Nohutalan
- Ovacık
- Özbek
- Rüstem
- Sıra
- Şirinkent
- Torasan
- Uzunkuyu
- Yağcılar
- Yaka
- Yelaltı
- Yeni
- Yenice
- Yenikent
- Zeytinalanı
- Zeytineli
- Zeytinler

== Economy ==
Enterprises in Urla	2007
Services	592
Industrial	16
Commerce	1,200
Exporters	4
Agricultural	3,204

Secondary and/or seasonal residences continue to play a key role in Urla's economy, as demonstrated by the high number of residences (26,000 in all for the district) as compared to its population. Although Urla is keen to upgrade its arguments as a tourism destination with a wider appeal, the number of beds available in its accommodation units remains rather modest at only 185.

Urla's fish restaurants and other local specialties, notably a layered pastry called "katmer" is famous. Urla's name is also associated in Turkey with a particular breed of "okra", red in color, called "kınalı bamya" in Turkish.

While there are no large shopping malls in Urla, mid-size distributors and small commerces abound, especially in the coastal section of the district center. The total number of companies for the district as a whole was 1,812 in 2007. There are four banks operating through four branches in Urla.

In 2006, the district realized exports reaching 524,068 US Dollars, mostly agricultural products with added value. Some marble and lime is quarried but the contribution of mining activities to the general economy of the district is low. The same can be said for industrial activities in general, which are almost exclusively based on agriculture or livestock. The three small industrial zones present in the district center since the 1990s, employing about 650 people, usually house enterprises focused on maintenance and reparation activities.

Fruit&vegetable production	2006 (tonnes)
Olive (for olive oil)	14,205
Tomato (for table consumption)	5,200
Watermelon	4,300
Okra (red)	3,700
Olive (for table consumption)	3,700
Tomato (for sauce)	2,600
Artichoke	1,500
Grape (for table consumption)	1,146
Satsuma	852
Cabbage	750
Aubergine	600
Watermelon	560
Chili pepper	420
Lettuce	340
Broccoli	250
Grape (for wine)	240
Orange	135
Nectarine	105

Agricultural production remains the determinant activity for much of the district. In the district's total agricultural area of 971.5 hectares, 21% of which is irrigable, 36% is accounted by olive orchards and 17% by vegetable gardens. There are about six hundred thousand olive trees across the district. Although fruits and vegetables in general, and citrus fruits, vineyards, decorative plants and flowers (especially chrysanthemum, hyacinth, narcissus and carnation) in particular, correspond for each only to 1 or 2 per cent of the total area used for agriculture, their added value for the district economy as a whole is significant.

Agriculture based on greenhouse cultivation acquired an increasing importance in Urla in recent years, especially in the villages near the town center, as well in parts of the municipal area that are still open for agricultural production. Urla quarters of Zeytinalanı and İçmeler and the nearby village of Kuşçular stand out with their greenhouses focused on vegetable production, and those in the villages of Bademler and Özbek on flowers, the total number of households engaged in greenhouse cultivation (both vegetables and decorative plants) being around 400 according to İzmir Chamber of Commerce figures. The same source cites the figures for the number of commercial enterprises occupied with this branch of agricultural activity as 26, the total area reserved for greenhouse farming as being around 1,500 decares, with 91 varieties cultivated. In Urla there are to date no certified enterprises engaged in organic farming, a new form of agriculture in which a number of new ventures made a name in İzmir city's eastern neighboring district of Kemalpaşa.

17 per cent of the district's land, although suitable for agriculture, is still unused currently.

In livestock breeding, poultry stands well above other livestock, a population of around 2 million chicken and perhaps up to eighty thousand turkey having been estimated for the district. 25 poultry enterprises present in Urla operate as subcontractors on behalf of Turkey's national brands in the industry. The count for bovine and ovine animals in Urla range between 5 and 8 thousand and some small-scale apiculture is also done. 220 tonnes of fish was caught across Urla shoreline in 2007, principally sea bass, gilthead bream and red mullet, the fishing activities being organized around five cooperatives and catering Urla's fish restaurants or İzmir's fish markets. Eleven fish farming enterprises are present in the coastal areas of four villages (Balıklıova, Gülbahçe, Uzunkuyu, Zeytinler).

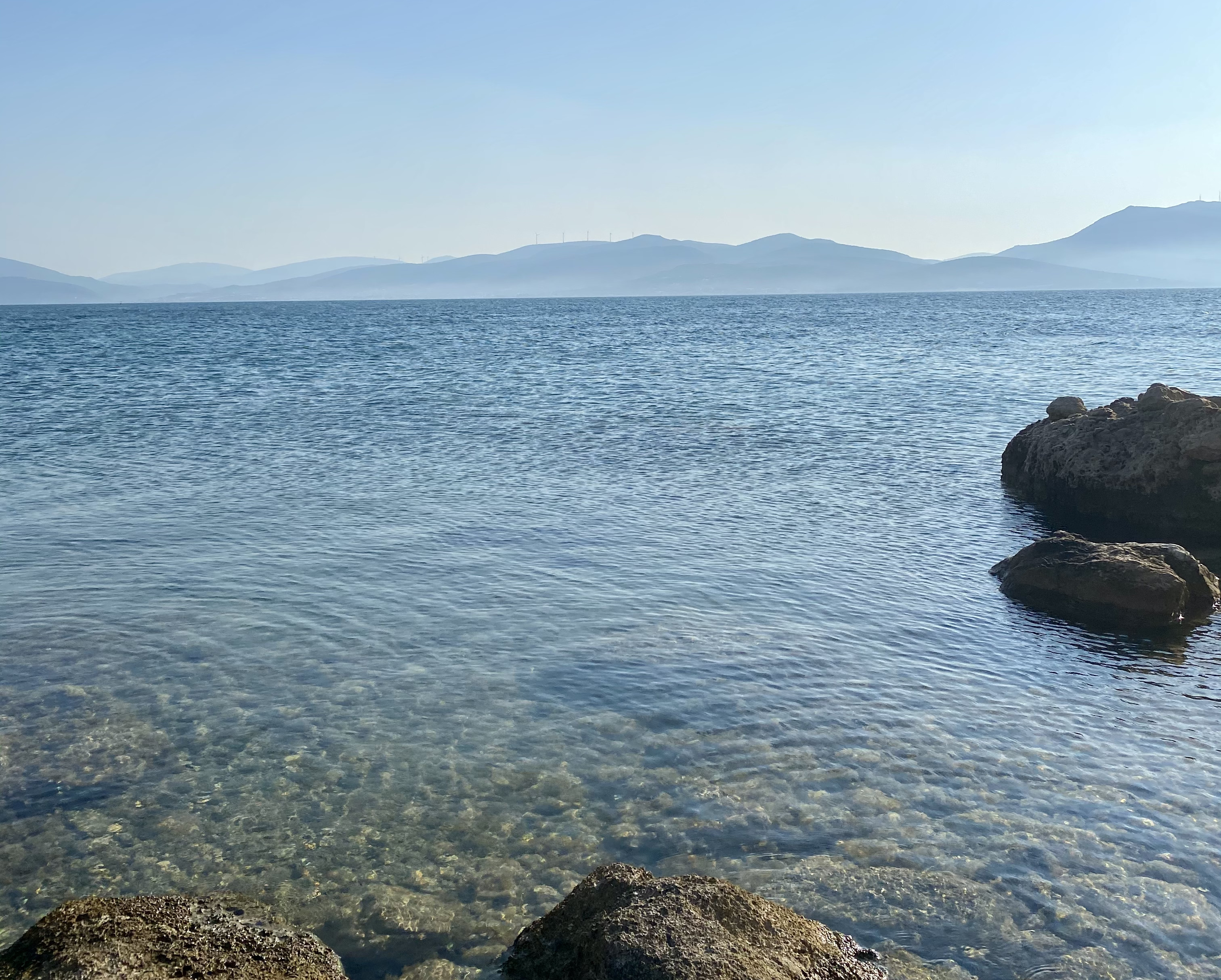
A beach in Urla

There are 6 stock farms (horse breeding and care) and two enterprises engaged in dog breeding and care in Urla.

== Education and Health ==
There are 16 students for each teacher and 492 patients for each doctor in Urla.

== History ==
=== Limantepe ===
Information on Urla region's pre-Hellenistic history is quite recent, based on the excavations in Limantepe pursued by an international team since 1979. Some researchers refer in its context to the possible most ancient regularly used port in the world.

=== Klazomenai - Kilizman ===
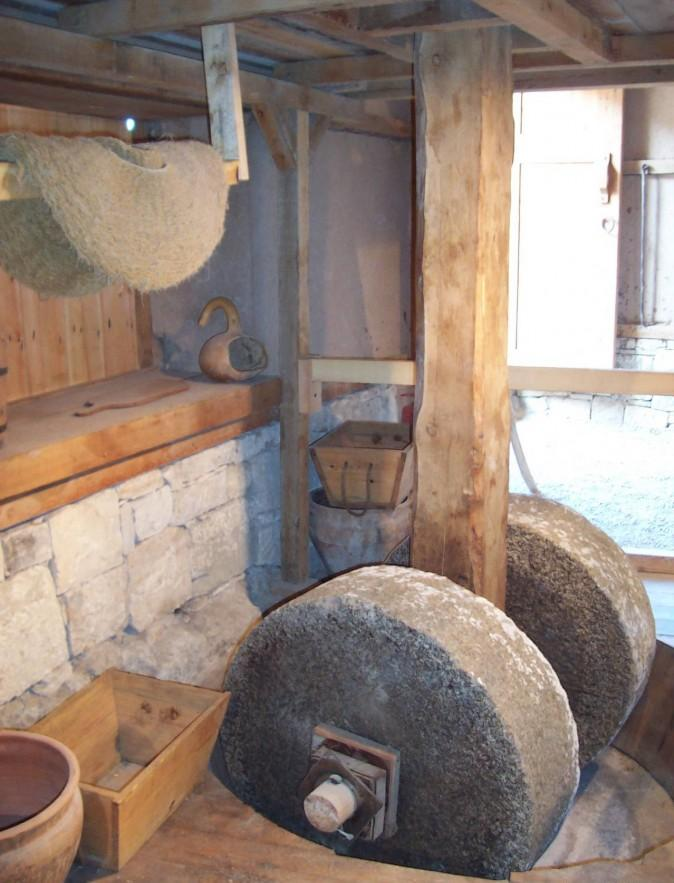
Interior of the olive oil production workshop restored by Ege University.

Urla was an important cultural centre also in its Hellenistic period. It was the site of the Ionian city of Klazomenai. Pieces of art and sculpture found during excavations are now exhibited in the Louvre or in İzmir Archaeology Museum.

The oldest attested olive oil production facilities were recently discovered in Klazomenai. The traces also indicate first exports of olive oil by way of sea.

Olive oil extraction installation (işlik) dating back to the third quarter of the 6th century BC uncovered in Klazomenai is the only surviving example of a level and weights press from an ancient Greek city and precedes by at least two centuries the next securely datable earliest presses found in Greece. It was restored and reconstructed in 2004-2005 through collaboration between Ege University, a Turkish olive-oil exporter and a German natural building components company, as well as by local artisans, on the basis of the clearly visible millstone with a cylindrical roller and three separation pits. The olive oil obtained turned out to be quite a success in business terms as well.

=== Turkish era ===
In the summit of Ottoman power, during the 16th century, Urla was almost entirely incorporated into the pious foundation established by Ayşe Hafsa Sultan for the revenues and the maintenance of the complex she had had built in Manisa in the 1520s. With the decline of the Ottoman power, the town, placed along with the entire peninsula at the frontier of the Aegean Sea difficult to control, frequently saw itself at the mercy of plunderers. İzmir's rise as an international trade port partially relieved Urla from its security concerns, while it also gradually increased its dependency to the neighboring metropolis. A quarantine center was established in Urla in 1865 through French initiative, in the island opposite Urla quay that bears today the very name of Karantina, and where part of the site of ancient Klazomenai also extends. The center was in service until the 1950s, now transformed into a state hospital and an annexed summer camp, although the quarantine installations are still standing. Prior to the foundation of the quarantine center, Admiral Charles Napier had spent the winter of 1839-1840 here, before intervening, along with allied Turkish troops, against Muhammad Ali of Egypt in Lebanon. From 1867 until 1922, Urla was part of the Aidin Vilayet of the Ottoman Empire. The town's population in 1914 was composed of 9.361 Turks, 24.711 Greeks, 423 Jews, 51 Bulgarians and 42 Armenians. The Greek inhabitants left for Greece after the 1923 Population Exchange with many settling in the town of Kamena Vourla. After 1923, Urla became a Turkish majority town.

=== Seferis and Cumalı ===
Urla had two important men of letters among his sons: It is the birthplace of the Greek poet and Nobel Prize laureate Giorgos Seferis and the Turkish novelist Necati Cumalı (born in Florina and re-settled in the framework of the 1923 Exchange of Greek and Turkish Populations) grew up in Urla.

== Archaeology ==
In January 2021, archaeologists headed by Elif Koparal, announced the discovery of the ruins of a 2500 year-old temple of Aphrodite from the 5th century BC. Among other findings in and around the temple, they found a statue piece depicting a woman, a terracotta female head and an inscription that reads, "This is the sacred area". The traces of the temple were first excavated in 2016.

== Notable people ==
- Soner Ergençay, Turkish football player
- Duygu Sakallı, Turkish handballer
- Giorgos Seferis, Greek poet and diplomat, Nobel Prize in Literature 1963
- Georgios Afthonidis, Greek member of the Filiki Eteria and worker of the Ecumenical Patriarchate
- Iakovos Tombazis & Emmanouil Tombazis, Greek revolutionaries with familial origins from Urla

== Festivals ==
- Urla Artichoke Festival
- Mart Dokuzu Herb Festival

== See also ==
- Limantepe
- Klazomenai
- İzmir Institute of Technology

== Resources ==
- "Report: Urla, 33p" (PDF) (in Turkish). İzmir Chamber of Commerce. 2007. Archived from the original (PDF) on 21 October 2012.
- Urla's names as referred to by Dr. Mahmut Tolon
