= List of islands in the Mediterranean =

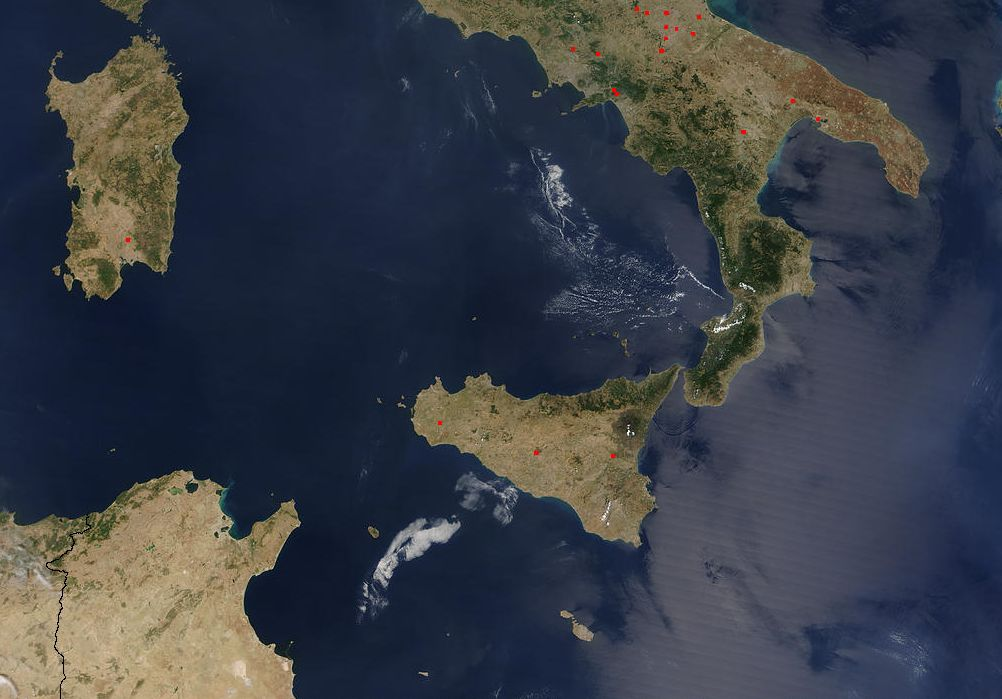
The two biggest islands of the Mediterranean: Sicily (center) and Sardinia (top left), which are both part of Italy.

The Mediterranean Sea basin is estimated to host more than 10,000 islands, with 2,217 islands larger than 0.01 km^{2}. The two main island countries in the region are Malta and Cyprus, while other countries with islands in the Mediterranean Sea include Albania, Algeria, Croatia, Egypt, France, Greece, Israel, Italy, Lebanon, Libya, Morocco, Montenegro, Spain, Syria, Tunisia and Turkey.

== By area ==
10 largest islands of the Mediterranean Sea:
1 Sicily
2 Sardinia
3 Cyprus
4 Corsica
5 Crete
6 Euboea
7 Mallorca
8 Lesbos
9 Rhodes
10 Chios

Name	Image	Country	Area		Population	Capital / main city
Name	Image	Country	km^{2}	sq mi	Population	Capital / main city
Sicily		Italy	25,834	9,975	5,010,001	Palermo
Sardinia		Italy	24,100	9,300	1,656,000	Cagliari
Cyprus		Cyprus; Akrotiri and Dhekelia (U.K.)	9,251	3,572	1,244,188	Nicosia
Corsica		France	8,681	3,352	322,000	Ajaccio
Crete		Greece	8,312	3,209	622,871	Heraklion
Euboea (Evia)		Greece	3,655	1,411	191,206	Chalcis
Mallorca (Majorca)		Spain	3,640	1,410	846,000	Palma
Lesbos		Greece	1,630	630	86,436	Mytilene
Rhodes		Greece	1,398	540	115,490	Rhodes
Chios		Greece	842	325	51,390	Chios
Cephalonia (Kefalonia)		Greece	781	302	35,801	Argostoli
Menorca		Spain	694	268	87,000	Mahón
Corfu		Greece	592	229	100,853	Corfu
Ibiza		Spain	577	223	111,000	Ibiza Town
Djerba		Tunisia	523	202	139,544	Houmt Souk
Lemnos (Limnos)		Greece	476	184	16,992	Myrina
Samos		Greece	476	184	32,973	Vathy
Naxos	Naxos map	Greece	428	165	17,970	Naxos
Zakynthos		Greece	406	157	40,758	Zakynthos
Cres		Croatia	405.78	156.67	3,079	Cres
Krk		Croatia	405.78	156.67	19,383	Krk
Brač		Croatia	394.57	152.34	13,956	Supetar
Andros		Greece	380	150	9,221	Andros
Thasos		Greece	379	146	13,765	Thasos
Lefkada		Greece	303	117	22,076	Lefkada
Karpathos		Greece	301	116	6,181	Pigadia
Hvar		Croatia	299.66	115.70	11,077	Hvar
Kos		Greece	290	110	33,388	Kos
Pag		Croatia	284.56	109.87	9,059	Pag
Gökçeada		Turkey	279	108	8,894	Çınarlı
Kythira		Greece	278	107	3,973	Kythira
Korčula		Croatia	276.03	106.58	15,522	Korčula
Icaria		Greece	255	98	8,423	Agios Kirykos
Malta		Malta	246	95	409,259	Valletta
Elba		Italy	224	86	31,572	Portoferraio
Skyros		Greece	209	81	2,994	Skyros
Paros		Greece	196	76	13,715	Parikia
Tinos		Greece	194	75	8,636	Tinos
Samothrace		Greece	178	69	2,859	Samothrace
Milos		Greece	160	62	4,977	Plaka
Kea		Greece	129	50	2,446	Ioulis
Amorgos		Greece	121	47	1,971	Amorgos
Marmara		Turkey	117	45		Marmara
Dugi Otok		Croatia	114.44	44.19	1,655	Sali
Kalymnos		Greece	111	43	16,001	Pothia
Chergui		Tunisia	110	42		Remla
Sant'Antioco		Italy	109	42	11,730	Sant'Antioco
Ios		Greece	109	42	2,024	Ios
Mljet		Croatia	100.41	38.77	1,088	Babino Polje
Kythnos		Greece	100	39	1,456	Kythnos
Astypalaia		Greece	97	37	1,334	Astypalaia
Ithaca		Greece	96	37	3,231	Vathy
Skopelos		Greece	95.5	36.9	4,960	Skopelos
Salamis		Greece	95	37	39,283	Salamina
Rab		Croatia	90.84	35.07	9,328	Rab
Vis		Croatia	90.26	34.85	3,445	Vis
Mykonos		Greece	86	33	10,120	Mykonos
Syros		Greece	84	32	21,505	Ermoupoli
Aegina		Greece	83	32	13,056	Aegina
Formentera		Spain	83	32	7,461	Sant Francesc Xavier
Pantelleria		Italy	83	32	7,729	Pantelleria
Santorini		Greece	76	29	15,230	Fira
Lošinj		Croatia	74.68	28.83	7,587	Mali Lošinj
Serifos		Greece	73	28	1,420	Serifos
Sifnos		Greece	73	28	2,625	Apollonia
Gharbi		Tunisia	69	27		Mellita
Gozo		Malta	67	26	37,288	Victoria
Kasos		Greece	66	25	1,084	Fry
Alonissos		Greece	64	25	2,712	Patitiri
Tilos		Greece	63	24	780	Megálo Chorió
Pašman		Croatia	63.34	24.46	2,845	Pašman
Šolta		Croatia	58.98	22.77	1,700	Grohote
Symi		Greece	58	22	2,590	Symi
Leros		Greece	53	20	7,907	Agia Marina
San Pietro		Italy	51	20	6,444	Carloforte
Asinara		Italy	51	20	1	Cala d'Oliva
Hydra		Greece	50	19	1,948	Hydra
Ugljan		Croatia	50.21	19.39	6,049	Preko
Skiathos		Greece	48	19	6,088	Skiathos
Lastovo		Croatia	46.87	18.10	792	Lastovo
Ischia		Italy	46	18	60,335	Ischia
Agios Efstratios		Greece	43	17	270	Agios Efstratios
Nisyros		Greece	41	16	987	Mandraki
Sikinos		Greece	41	16	273	Sikinos
Psara		Greece	40	15	454	Psara
Anafi		Greece	38	15	271	Anafi
Lipari		Italy	37	14	10,763	Lipari
Bozcaada		Turkey	36	14	2,427	Bozcaada
Kimolos		Greece	36	14	908	Kimolos
Antiparos		Greece	35	14	1,211	Antiparos
Patmos		Greece	35	14	2,998	Patmos
Kornat		Croatia	32.30	12.47	19	
Folegandros		Greece	32	12	765	Folegandros
Fourni		Greece	30	12	1,313	Fourni
Gavdos		Greece	29.6	11.4	152	Kastri
Čiovo		Croatia	28.80	11.12	5,908	Okrug Gornji
Halki		Greece	28.1	10.8	478	Halki
Salina		Italy	26.8	10.3	2,300	Malfa
Olib		Croatia	26.09	10.07	140	Olib
Uzunada		Turkey	25.4	9.8		
Paxi		Greece	25.3	9.8	2,280	Gaios
Kalamos		Greece	25	9.75	496	Kalamos
Kyra Panagia		Greece	25	9.7	2	
Giglio		Italy	23.8	9.2	1,458	
Cunda (Alibey)		Turkey	23.4	9.0		
Poros		Greece	22.9	8.8	3,993	Poros
Molat		Croatia	22.82	8.81	197	Molat
Vir		Croatia	22.38	8.64	3,000	Vir
Spetses		Greece	22.2	8.6	4,027	Spetses
Paşalimanı		Turkey	21.4	8.3		Harmanli
Saria		Greece	21.1	8.1	45	
Vulcano		Italy	20.9	8.1	715	Vulcano
Avsa		Turkey	20.6	8.0		Avsa
Antikythera		Greece	20.4	7.9	68	Potamós
Lampedusa		Italy	20.2	7.8	4,500	Lampedusa e Linosa
La Maddalena		Italy	20.1	7.8	11,902	La Maddalena
Meganisi		Greece	20	7.7	1,040	Katomeri
Favignana		Italy	19	7.3	4,383	Favignana
Capraia		Italy	19	7.3	410	Capraia
Elafonisos		Greece	19	7.3	1,024	Elafonisos
Murter		Croatia	18.60	7.18	4,895	Murter
Makronisos		Greece	18.3	7.1	9	
Irakleia		Greece	17.6	6.8	141	Irakleia
Iž		Croatia	17.59	6.79	615	Iž Veli
Gyaros		Greece	17.3	6.7	0	
Megalonisos Petalion		Greece	17.2	6.6	0	
Polyaigos		Greece	17.2	6.6	2	
Unije		Croatia	16.92	6.53	88	Unije
Leipsoi		Greece	16	6.2	790	Leipsoi
Šipan		Croatia	15.81	6.10	419	Šipanska Luka
Caprera		Italy	15.7	6.1	0	
Cabrera		Spain	15.7	6.1	0	
Keros		Greece	15.2	5.9	0	
Žirje		Croatia	15.06	5.81	103	Žirje
Sestrunj		Croatia	15.03	5.80	48	Sestrunj
Silba		Croatia	14.98	5.78	292	Silba
Žut		Croatia	14.82	5.72	0	
Pserimos		Greece	14.8	5.7	80	Pserimos
Oinousses		Greece	14.4	5.6	826	Oinousses
Peristera		Greece	14.2	5.5	30	
Rineia		Greece	13.7	5.3	0	
Agathonisi		Greece	13.6	5.3	185	Megálo Chorió
Donoussa		Greece	13.6	5.3	167	Donoussa (Stavros)
Prvic (Krk)		Croatia	13.5	5.2	0	
Stromboli		Italy	12.6	4.9	572	San Vincenzo
Dokos		Greece	12.5	4.8	18	Dokos
Porquerolles		France	12.5	4.8	200	
Schiza		Greece	12.3	4.7	0	
Drvenik Veliki		Croatia	12.1	4.7	168	Drvenik Veliki
Marettimo		Italy	12	4.6	819	Marettimo
Agistri		Greece	12	4.6	1,142	Milos (Megalohori)
Dia		Greece	11.8	4.6	0	
Gioura		Greece	11.1	4.3	0	
Capri		Italy	10.4	4.0	12,200	Capri
Montecristo		Italy	10.4	4.0	2	
Pianosa		Italy	10.3	4.0	10	
Othonoi		Greece	10.1	3.9	392	Othonoi
Thymaina		Greece	10.1	3.9	143	Thymaina
Imrali		Turkey	10	3.9		
Ist		Croatia	9.65	3.73	202	
Filicudi		Italy	9.5	3.7	235	
Therasia		Greece	9.3	3.6	319	
Kastellorizo		Greece	9.1	3.5	492	
Levitha		Greece	9.1	3.5	0	
Sapientza		Greece	9.1	3.5	2	
Île du Levant		France	9	3.5		
Kara Ada		Turkey	9	3.5		
Premuda		Croatia	8.7	3.4	58	
Ustica		Italy	8.7	3.4	1,302	
Plavnik		Croatia	8.6	3.3	0	
Maun		Croatia	8.5	3.3	0	
Šćedro		Croatia	8.4	3.2	0	
Zlarin		Croatia	8.1	3.1	276	
Schoinousa		Greece	8.1	3.1	227	
Antimilos		Greece	8	3.1	0	
Syrna		Greece	7.9	3.1	0	
Despotiko		Greece	7.8	3.0	0	
Ammouliani		Greece	7.7	3.0	541	
Ponza		Italy	7.5	2.9	3,107	
Alimia		Greece	7.4	2.9	0	
La Galite		Tunisia	7.3	2.8	0	
Kaprije		Croatia	7.1	2.7	143	
Port-Cros		France	7	2.7	30	
Arkoi		Greece	6.7	2.6	44	
Sveti Grgur		Croatia	6.4	2.5	0	
Skantzoura		Greece	6.2	2.4	0	
Biševo		Croatia	5.9	2.3	15	
Kastos		Greece	5.9	2.3	80	
Tavolara		Italy	5.9	2.3	0	
Levanzo		Italy	5.8	2.2	208	
Pano Koufonisi		Greece	5.8	2.2	399	
Sazan Island		Albania	5.7	2.2	0	
Veliki Brijun		Croatia	5.7	2.2	0	
Ilovik		Croatia	5.5	2.1	85	
Petalas		Greece	5.5	2.1	0	
Total			102,926.06	39,739.97	11,683,668	

== By population (above 200,000) ==
Name	Country	Population	Capital / main city
Sicily	Italy	5,010,001	Palermo
Sardinia	Italy	1,656,000	Cagliari
Cyprus	Cyprus; Akrotiri and Dhekelia (U.K.)	1,244,188	Nicosia
Mallorca	Spain	920,605	Palma
Crete	Greece	622,871	Heraklion
Malta	Malta	494,000	Valletta
Corsica	France	322,000	Ajaccio

== By country ==
=== Albania ===
- Sazan
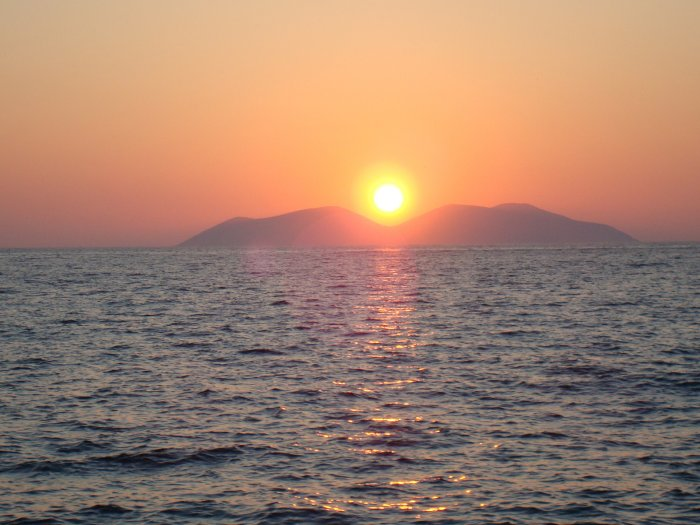
  Sunset over Sazan Island as seen from Vlorë, Albania.
- Kunë
- Ksamil Islands
- Franz Joseph Island
- Zvërnec Islands
- Tongo Island
- Stil Island

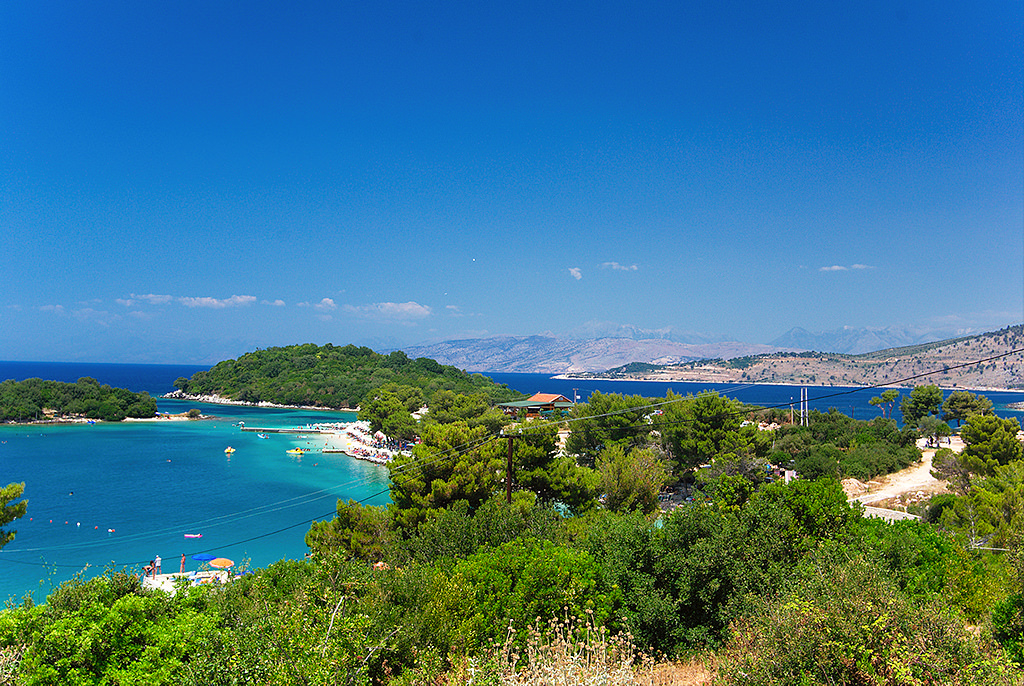
Ksamil Islands in Albania.

=== Croatia ===
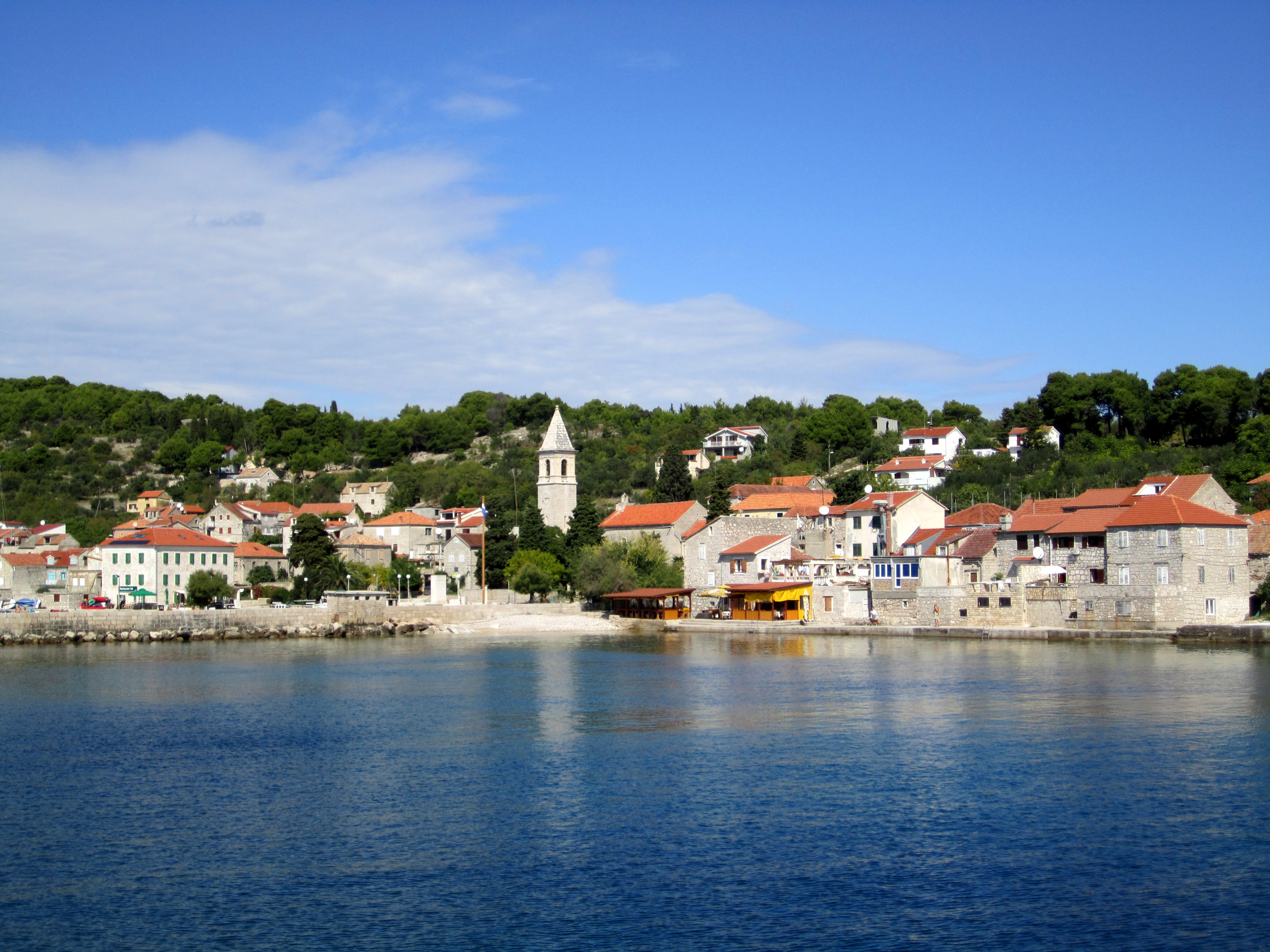
Prvić Luka, Croatia

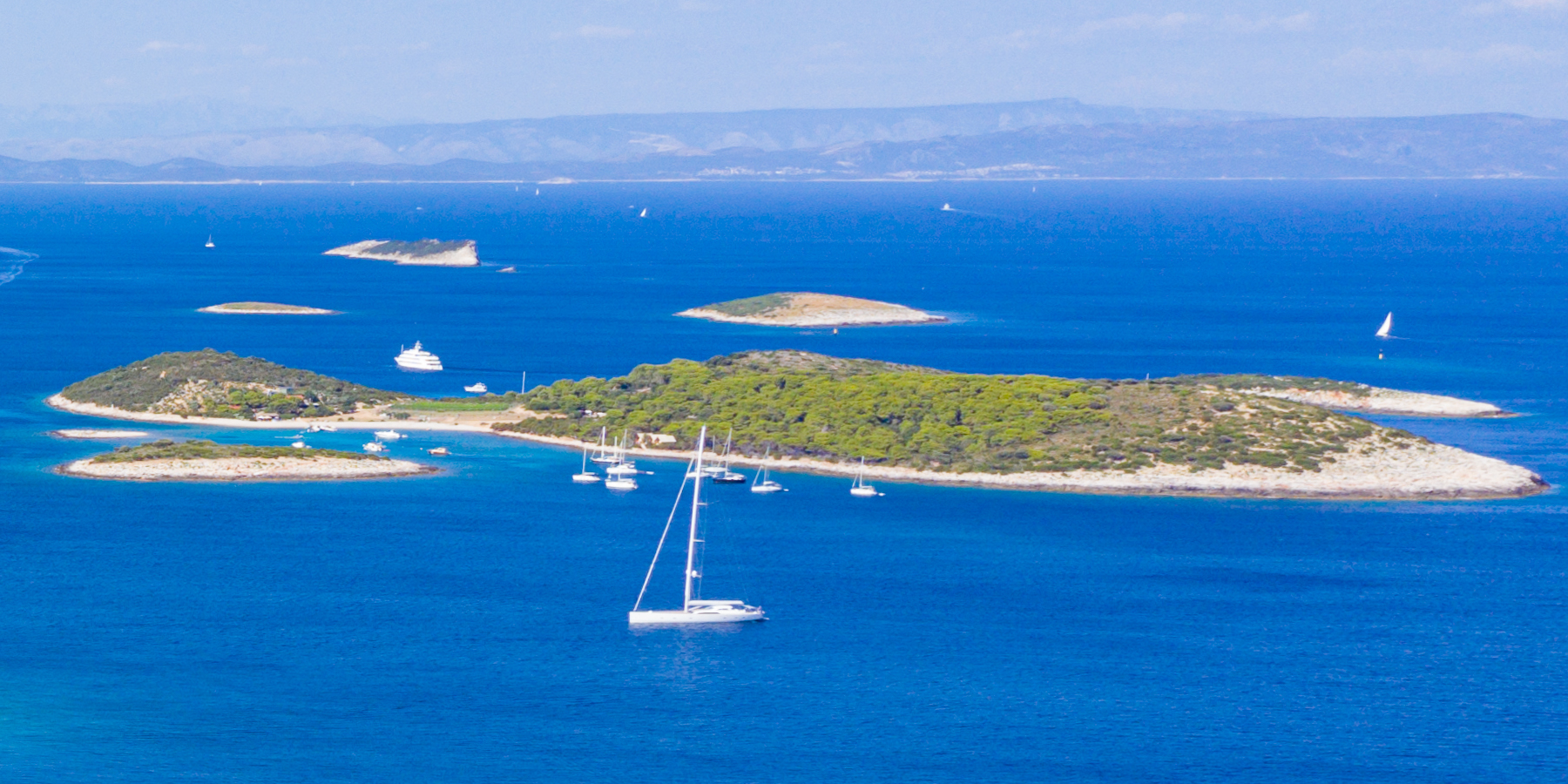
The Adriatic Sea contains over 1200 islands and islets

- Brijuni (14 islands)
- Brač
- Brusnik
- Čiovo
- Cres
- Drvenik Mali
- Drvenik Veliki
- Dugi otok
- Elaphiti islands
- Goli otok
- Hvar
- Iž
- Ilovik
- Ist
- Kaprije
- Koločep
- Korčula
- Kornati (152 islands)
- Krapanj
- Krk
- Lastovo
- Lošinj
- Lokrum
- Lopud
- Male Srakane
- Mljet
- Molat
- Murter
- Olib
- Pašman
- Pag
- Palagruža
- Plavnik
- Premuda
- Prvić
- Rab
- Rava
- Rivanj
- Sestrunj
- Silba
- Skarda
- Susak
- Svetac
- Sveti Andrija
- Šipan
- Šolta
- Ugljan
- Unije
- Vele Srakane
- Vir
- Vis
- Vrgada
- Zlarin
- Zverinac
- Žirje
- Žut

=== France ===
- Corsica
  - Lavezzi Islands
  - Cavallo Island
- Frioul archipelago
- Lérins Islands
- Îles d'Hyères

=== Greece ===
- Crete
- Euboea
- Gavdos

==== Cyclades ====
- Amorgos
- Anafi
- Andros
- Antimilos
- Antiparos
- Delos
- Despotiko
- Donousa
- Folegandros
- Gyaros
- Ios
- Iraklia
- Kea (commonly known as Tzia)
- Keros
- Kimolos
- Koufonisi
- Kythnos
- Makronisos
- Milos
- Mykonos
- Naxos
- Paros
- Polyaigos
- Rineia
- Santorini
- Schinousa
- Serifos
- Sifnos
- Sikinos
- Syros
- Thirasia
- Tinos

==== Dodecanese Islands ====
- Agathonissi
- Arkoi
- Armathia
- Astypalia
- Farmakonisi
- Gyali
- Halki
- Kalolimnos
- Kalymnos
- Karpathos
- Kassos
- Kastellorizo
- Kos
- Leipsoi
- Leros
- Nisyros
- Patmos
- Pserimos
- Rhodes
- Saria
- Symi
- Tilos

==== Ionian Islands ====
- Antikythera
- Antipaxos
- Corfu (Kerkyra)
- Ereikoussa
- Ithaki
- Kalamos Island
- Kastos
- Kefalonia
- Kythera
- Lefkada
- Meganisi
- Othonoi
- Paxoi
- Petalas
- Zakynthos

==== North Aegean islands ====
- Chios
- Fournoi
- Ikaria
- Limnos
- Lesvos
- Oinousses
- Psara
- St Eustratius
- Samos
- Samothraki
- Thassos
- Thymaina

==== Saronic Islands ====
- Aegina
- Agistri
- Dokos
- Hydra
- Poros
- Salamina
- Spetses

==== Sporades Islands ====
- Alonissos
- Gioura
- Kyra Panagia
- Peristera
- Piperi
- Skantzoura
- Skiathos
- Skopelos
- Skyros

=== Italy ===
Notable Italian islands include:

- Calabria
  - Coreca Reefs
  - Isola di Dino
  - San Nicola Arcella
- Campanian Archipelago
  - Capri
  - Gaiola Island
  - Ischia
  - Nisida
  - Procida
  - Sirenuse
- Cheradi Islands
  - Gallipoli
  - San Paolo Island
  - Sant'Andrea Island
  - Vivara
- Marano Grado Lagoon
  - Barbana
  - Isola di Grado
- Ligurian Sea islands
  - Bergeggi
  - Gallinara
- Pontine Islands
  - Gavi
  - Ponza
  - Palmarola
  - Santo Stefano
  - Ventotene
  - Zannone
  - Zannone
- Sardinia
  - Asinara
  - Sant'Antioco
  - San Pietro
  - La Maddalena
    - Caprera
    - Spargi
    - Budelli
    - Razzoli
    - Santo Stefano
  - Molara Island
  - Tavolara
- Sicily
  - Aegadian Islands
    - Marettimo
    - Favignana
    - Levanzo
  - Aeolian Islands
    - Lipari
    - Vulcano
    - Filicudi
    - Alicudi
    - Panarea
    - Salina
    - Stromboli
  - Pantelleria
  - Pelagian Islands
    - Lampedusa
    - Lampione
    - Linosa
  - Ustica
- Tremiti Islands
  - Capraia
  - Cretaccio
  - Pianosa (di Tremiti)
  - San Domino
  - San Nicola
- Tuscan Archipelago
  - Capraia
  - Elba
  - Formiche di Grosseto
  - Giannutri
  - Giglio
  - Gorgona
  - Meloria
  - Montecristo
  - Palmaiola
  - Pianosa
- Venetian Lagoon islands
  - Burano
  - Chioggia
  - Giudecca
  - Isola di San Clemente
  - La Certosa
  - Lazzaretto Vecchio
  - Lido
  - Mazzorbo
  - Murano
  - Pellestrina
  - Poveglia
  - Sacca Fisola
  - San Francesco del Deserto
  - San Giorgio in Alga
  - San Giorgio Maggiore
  - San Lazzaro degli Armeni
  - San Marco in Boccalama
  - Isola di San Michele
  - San Secondo
  - San Pietro di Castello
  - San Servolo
  - Sant'Andrea
  - Sant'Angelo della Polvere
  - Sant'Elena
  - Sant'Erasmo
  - Santa Maria della Grazia
  - Sottomarina
  - Torcello
  - Tronchetto
  - Venice
  - Vignole

=== Lebanon ===
- Palm Islands
- Zireh Island

=== Malta ===
- Maltese Islands
  - Malta
  - Gozo
  - Comino
  - Cominotto
  - Filfla
  - St Paul's Island⁣⁣
  - Manoel Island
  - Fungus Rock

=== Montenegro ===
- Sveti Nikola Island
- Sveta Neđelja
- Katič
- Sveti Stefan
- Ada Bojana
- Stari Ulcinj

In Bay of Kotor:

  - Mamula
  - Prevlaka
  - Sveti Marko
  - Island of Our Lady of Mercy
  - Gospa od Škrpjela
  - Sveti Đorđe

=== Spain ===
- Alboran
- Balearic Islands
  - Gymnesian Islands
    - Mallorca
    - Menorca
    - Cabrera
    - Sa Dragonera
  - Pityusic (or Pine) Islands
    - Es Vedrà
    - Formentera
    - Eivissa / Ibiza
    - S'Espalmador
- Columbretes Islands
  - Illa Grossa or Columbret Gran
  - La Ferrera
  - La Foradada
  - El Carallot
- Islas Chafarinas
  - Isla del Congreso
  - Isla de Isabel II
  - Isla del Rey
- Islas Alhucemas
  - Peñón de Alhucemas
  - Isla de Tierra
  - Isla de Mar
- Tabarca
- Illes Medes
- Formigues
- Mazarrón
- Isla de Perejil
- Isla de Santa Catalina

=== Syria ===
- Arwad

=== Tunisia ===
- Djerba
- Kerkennah Islands
  - Chergui
  - Gharbi
- Galite Islands
- Zembra
- Kneiss
- Chikly
- Plane Island

=== Turkey ===
The following are some of the most notable Turkish Aegean islands. See Turkish Aegean islands for a more complete list.

- Aydıncık Islands
- Bozcaada or Tenedos
- Babadıl Islands
- Beşadalar
- Boğsak Island
- Boğsak Islet
- Bozyazı Island
- Burgazada
- Büyükada
- Çatalada
- Cunda Island
- Dana Adası
- Domuz Island
- Gemiler Adası
- Gökçeada or Imbros (largest Turkish island)
- Güvercin Island
- Hayırsız Ada
- Hekim Island
- Heybeli Ada
- Iç Ada
- İncir Ada
- Kara Ada
- Kara Ada (Bodrum)
- Kargı Adası
- Kekova
- Kınalıada
- Kizikada
- Kizkalesi
- Küçük Tavşan Adası
- Lale Island
- Metelik Island
- Salih Ada
- Sıçan Adası
- Tersane Island
- Uzunada
- Yassi Ada
- Yılancık Ada
- Yumurtalık Island

=== Disputed ===
- Imia/Kardak (Greece/Turkey)

=== Politically divided ===
- Cyprus (island)
  - Republic of Cyprus separated from the Turkish Republic of Northern Cyprus by a UN buffer zone
  - Turkish Republic of Northern Cyprus separated from the Republic of Cyprus by a UN buffer zone)
  - Akrotiri and Dhekelia (Sovereign Base Areas of the United Kingdom)

== See also ==
- Adriatic islands
- Aegean Islands
- Ionian Islands
