= Boğsak Tunnel =

Boğsak Tunnel Boğsak Tüneli
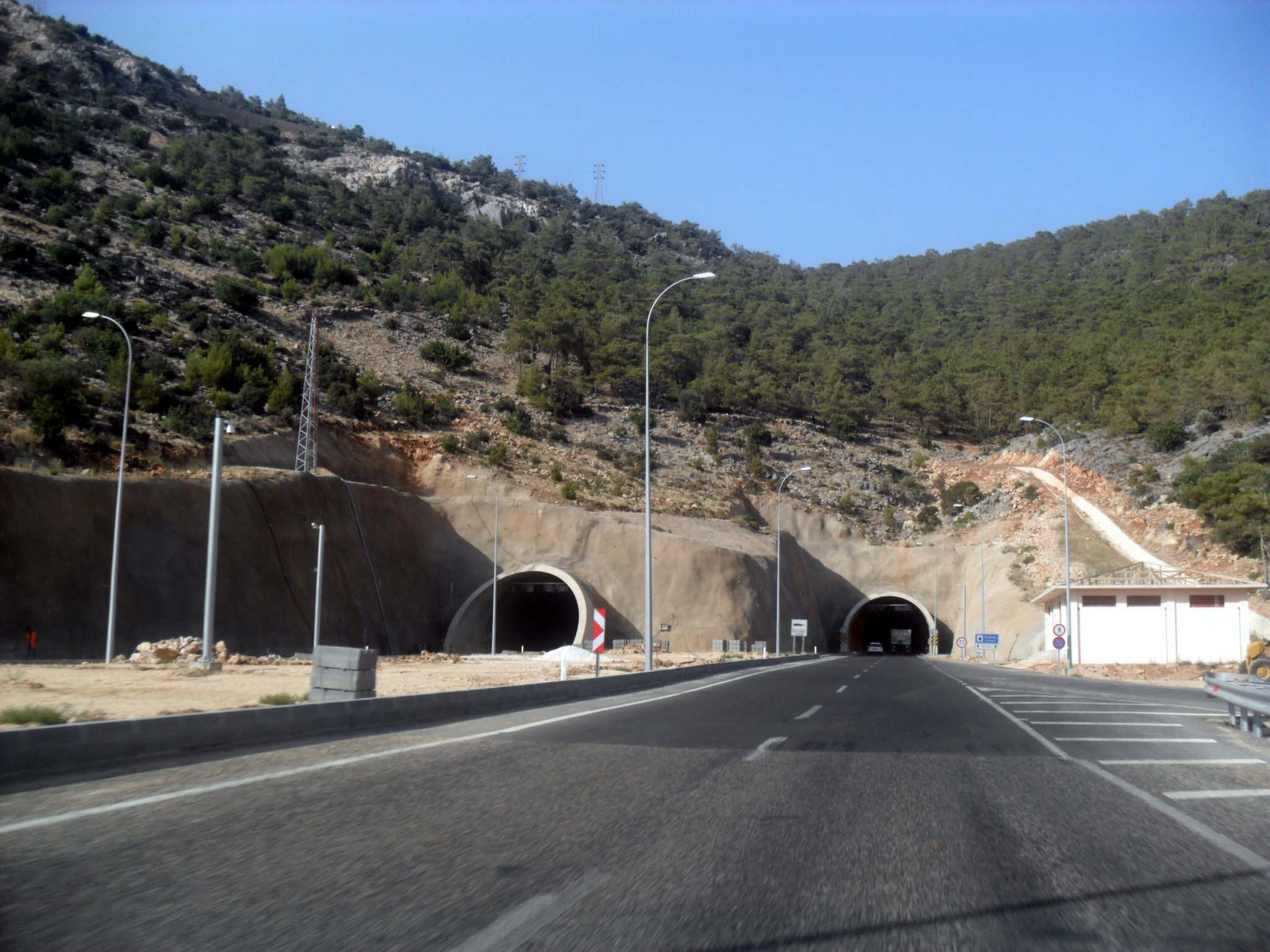
- Boğsak Tunnel west end
- Interactive map of Boğsak Tunnel; Boğsak Tüneli

Overview
- Location: Silifke, Mersin Province
- Coordinates: 36°16′01″N 33°48′20″E (East end)
- Route: D.400
- Start: Akdere, Silifke
- End: Boğsak

Operation
- Opened: 18 March 2014; 12 years ago
- Owner: General Directorate of Highways
- Traffic: Automotive
- Character: Twin-tube highway tunnel

Technical
- Length: 1,570 and 1,570 m (5,150 and 5,150 ft)
- No. of lanes: 2 x 2
- Operating speed: 70 km/h (43 mph)
- Width: 8 m (26 ft) each tube

Location of Boğsak Tunnel in Turkey

The Boğsak Tunnel is a road tunnel located in Silifke, Mersin Province in southern Turkey as part of the highway D.400.

The highway D.400 is the main route running all the way from west to east in southern Turkey. Toros Mountains, which run in parallel to Mediterranean Sea coast, are to the north of the highway. The mountain range meets occasionally the sea with a high-sloped coast. Particularly, the 487 km (303 mi) portion of the highway connecting the two major Mediterranean ports of Antalya and Mersin is known for its steep ramps and sharp curves in the mountainous area. One of the most problematic courses up to date was a 5 km (3.1 mi)-course between Boğsak in the east and Akdere in the west, which was called the Çile yolu (literally: Road of ordeal) by the drivers.

The tunnel was constructed to ease the traffic in this course. It was opened on 18 March 2014. After the construction of the tunnel, the ramps were avoided and the length of the highway reduced by about 3.7 km (2.3 mi). Construction of 22 other tunnels with a total distance of 18 km (11 mi) is planned to reduce the average travel time from 9 to 5 hours between Antalya and Mersin.

It is a 1,570 m (0.98 mi)-long twin-tube tunnel carrying two lanes of traffic in each direction. The tubes are 8 m (26 ft) wide. The tunnel is equipped with illumination, ventilation, intercommunication and other modern facilities. The construction of the tunnel cost ₺65 million.
