= Xerocrassa molinae =

Conservation status
- Near Threatened (IUCN 3.1)

Scientific classification
- Kingdom: Animalia
- Phylum: Mollusca
- Class: Gastropoda
- Order: Stylommatophora
- Family: Geomitridae
- Genus: Xerocrassa
- Species: X. molinae

Binomial name
- Xerocrassa molinae (Hidalgo, 1883)

Synonyms
- Helix molinae Hidalgo, 1883; Trochoidea molinae (Hidalgo, 1883); Xerocrassa (Amandana) molinae (Hidalgo, 1883) · alternate representation

Species of gastropod

Xerocrassa molinae is a species of air-breathing land snail, a pulmonate gastropod mollusk in the family Geomitridae.

== Distribution ==
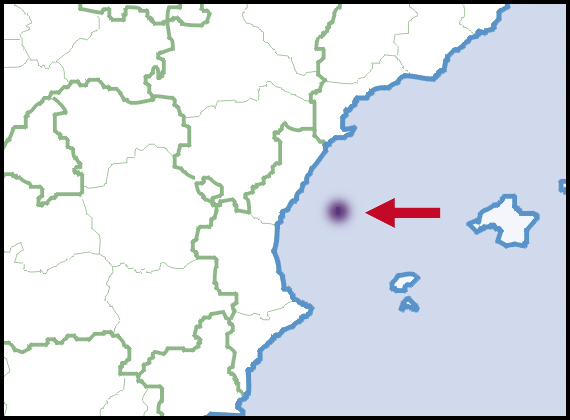
Distribution

This species is endemic to Spain, where it is restricted to the islands of Columbrete Grande (Illa Grossa) and Mancolibre (Columbretes Islands group).
