= Drvenik Veli =

Island of Croatia

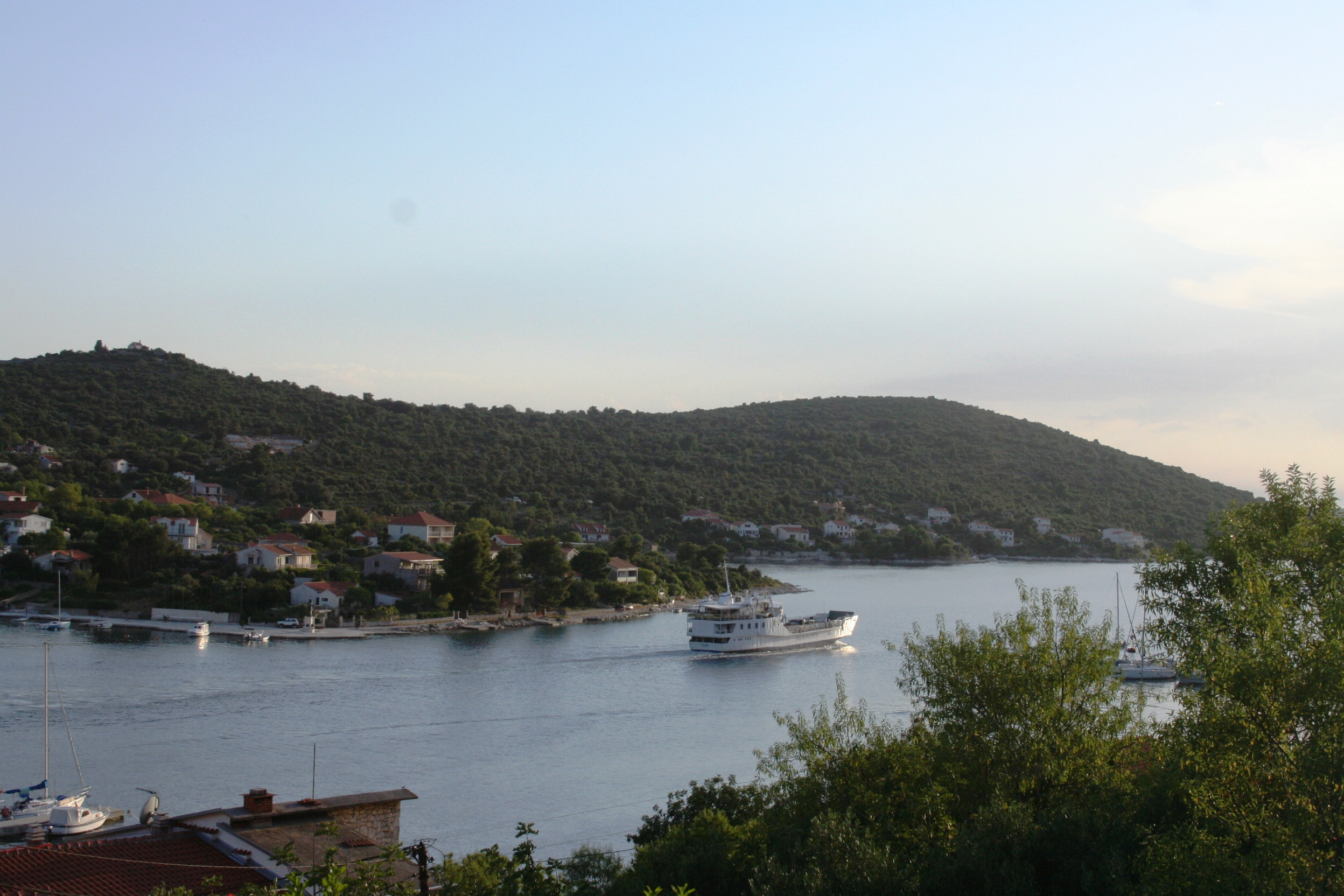
- Drvenik

- Location within Croatia
- Interactive map of Drvenik Veli

Geography
- Location: Adriatic Sea
- Coordinates: 43.444226°N 16.145439°E
- Area: 12.07 km^{2} (4.66 sq mi)
- Highest elevation: 178 m (584 ft)

Administration
- Croatia
- County: Split-Dalmatia County

Demographics
- Population: 150 (2011)
- Pop. density: 12.42/km^{2} (32.17/sq mi)

Drvenik Veli is a Croatian island in the Adriatic Sea. It is situated in the middle of the Dalmatian archipelago, northwest of Šolta, 1.8 kilometres (1.1 miles) from the mainland. Its area is 12.07 square kilometres (4.66 sq mi). The highest peak is 178 metres high. The only settlement on the island is the near-eponymous village of Drvenik Veliki (pronounced [dr̩v̞ɛ̌niːk v̞ɛ̂likiː]) with a population of 150 (2011 census).

The island was first inhabited in the 15th or 16th century. The main industries on the island are agriculture, fishing and tourism. The coast of the island is mainly rocky, but also has a few famous sand and pebble beaches like Krknjaši and Kokošinje.

== Etymology ==
Since ancient times, the island has been known by its Romanized name, Zirona. The name Zirona likely originated from the Illyrian root "gųer" meaning "forest", possibly because of the island's once dense woodlands. In Croatian documents from the 13th century, the island is mentioned as Girona, Gerona or Giruna. Some suggest that the name Girona might have Greek origins, derived from the noun "gyrona" meaning "rounded object", a notion supported by the island's somewhat rounded morphology. The Croatian name Drvenik ("veli" means "large" in Croatian) finds its origin in the Croatian word "drvo", meaning "wood", establishing a link either to its Illyrian roots, according to some, or to the town of Drvenik near Makarska, from which a significant portion of its population migrated in the 17th century.

== Gallery ==
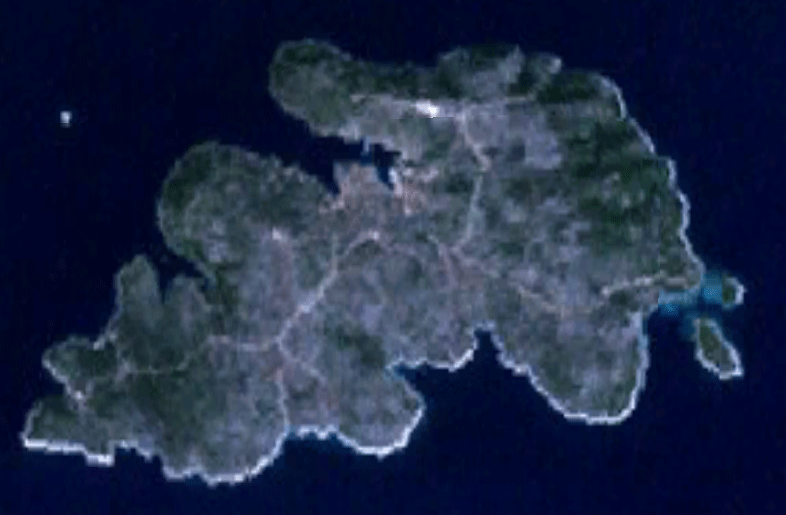
Satellite image of Drvenik Veli

== Sources ==
- Andreis, Mladen (October 1998). "Povijesna demografija Velog Drvenika, Malog Drvenika i Vinišća do god. 1900" (PDF). Radovi Zavoda za povijesne znanosti HAZU u Zadru (in Croatian) (40): 227–301.
