= Arkoudes =

Coordinates: 36.7540°N 24.4051°E

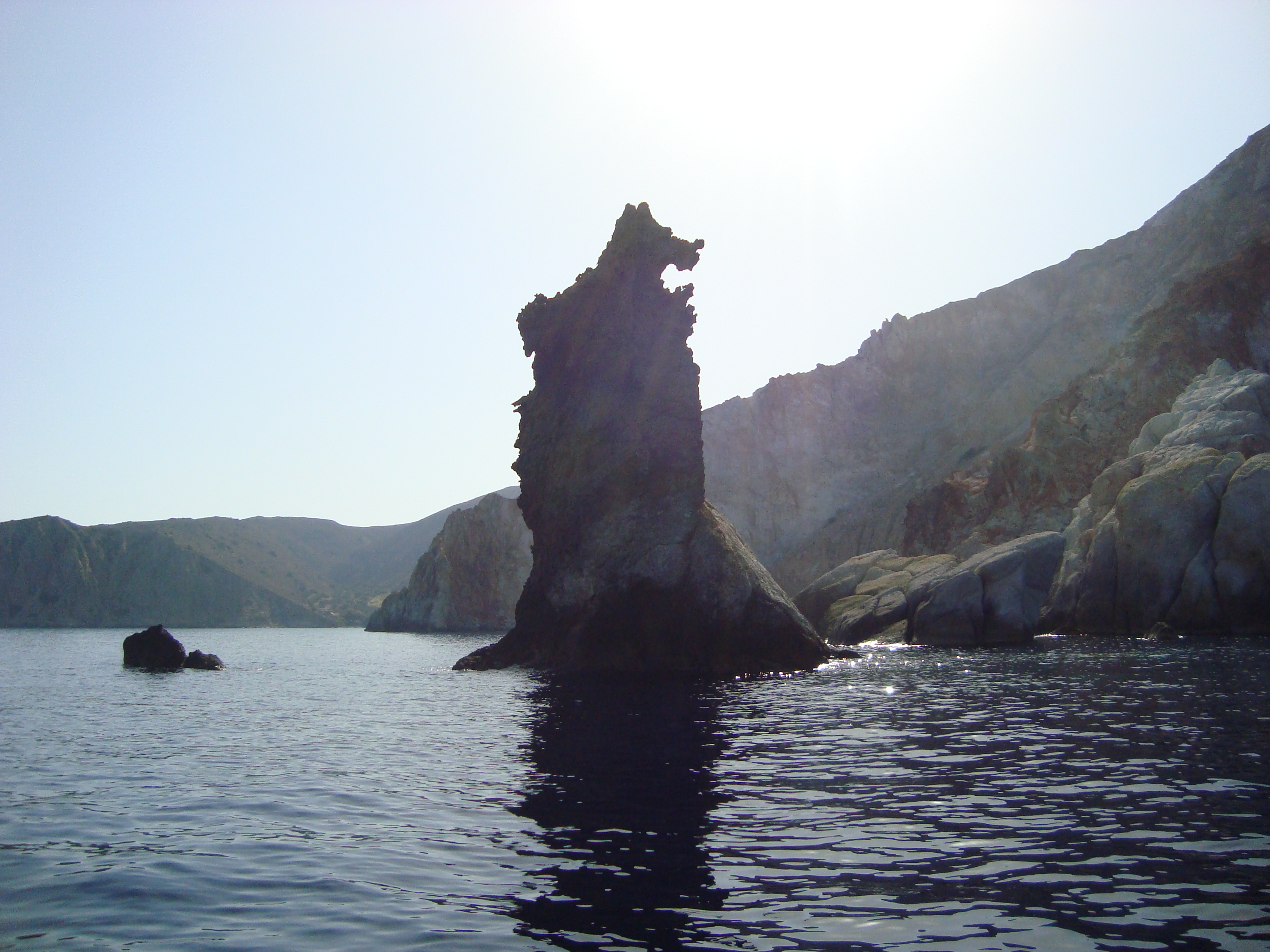
Arkoudes (The Bear Rock) off the shore of Milos Island.

The Arkoudes (Greek: Αρκούδες, lit. 'bears') are a group of rocky islets located off the coast of the island of Milos in Greece. The rocks appear to show an opening mouth, a nose, eyes, ears and a body that look rather like bears, whence their name. The rocks are about 20 feet high and the only way to see them is by boat that tours around the island. The natural sculptures are near Plathenia Beach and the entrance of the bay of Milos.

== See also ==
- Milos
- Milos Island National Airport (MLO)
- Antimilos
- Kimolos
- Santorini
