= San Marco in Boccalama =

Lost island in the Venetian Lagoon

- Location within Venetian Lagoon

Geography
- Coordinates: 45.388611°N 12.281389°E
- Adjacent to: Venetian Lagoon

Administration
- Italy
- Region: Veneto
- Province: Province of Venice

San Marco in Boccalama was an island, now submerged, in the Venetian Lagoon, northern Italy. It was located between Campana, Sant'Angelo della Polvere and the motte di Volpego. The name derived from the presence of a church dedicated to St. Mark, and to its location at the mouth the Lama, an old branch of the river Brenta's mouth.

An oratory existed here from as early as 1013. After 1328 subsidence and erosion made life impossible for the monks, and from 1348 it was used as a common burial place in the wake of the outbreak of the Black Death in Venice and its neighborhood. The last mentions of the islands date to the 16th century, after which it is likely it had already disappeared.

In the 1990s two medieval ships were found near the submerged island, a rascona (a flat transport boat) and a galley, the first example of this type found so far.

== Sources ==
- La galea ritrovata. Origine delle cose di Venezia. Venice. 2002.
