= Hayırsız Ada =

Hayırsız Ada may refer to:

- Sivriada also known as Hayırsızada, an island in the Sea of Marmara, near Istanbul.
- Hayırsız Island, Foça, one of the Foça Islands near Foça in Turkey.
