= Yılancık Island =

Turkish island in the Mediterranean Sea

Coordinates: 36°46′24″N 28°26′21″E

Yılancık Ada (literally "Small Snake Island") is a Turkish island in the Mediterranean Sea The island is within a first-degree military restricted area. Do not consider going to the beach or wandering around the island.
