= Kargı Adası =

Island in Turkey

- Location within Turkey
- Etymology: Kargı, from spear in Turkish

Geography
- Location: Northwestern end of Gökova Bay, 500m off Akyarlar point
- Coordinates: 36°57′5.4″N 27°18′18.87″E
- Archipelago: Aegean Archipelago

Administration
- Turkey

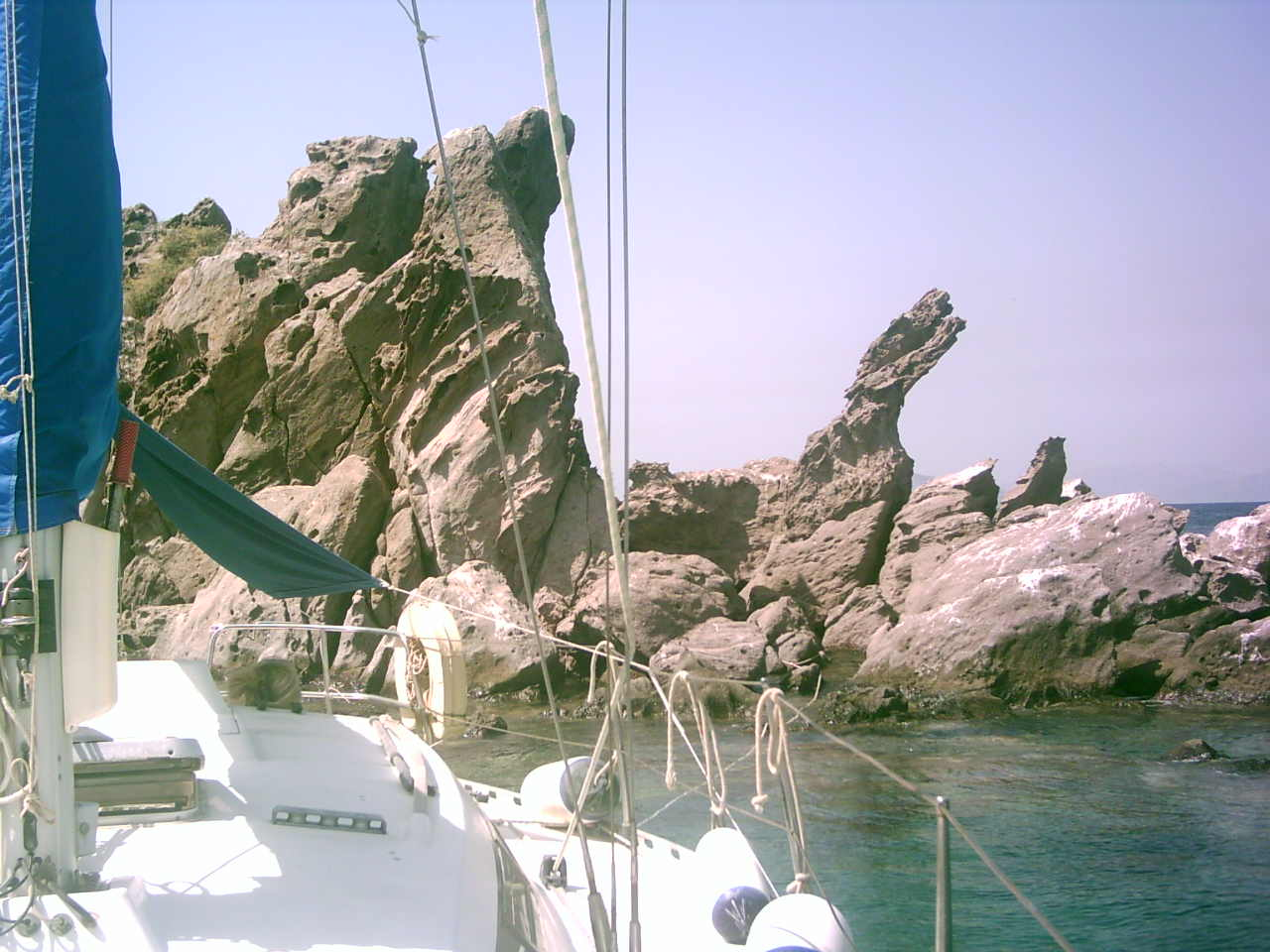
Kargı Adası Kayalıklar (Kargi Island rocks)

Kargı Adası is an uninhabited Turkish islet in the Aegean Sea, in Muğla Province, and a tourist destination renowned for fishing and scuba diving. It is likely that the island takes its name, which is literally translated as Spear Island, from the rock formations that make up the islet and resemble spears pointed towards the sky.

Due to its proximity to Bodrum, the islet is commonly used to define courses for the sailing regattas organised in the area.
