= Yumurtalık Island =

Island in Turkey

Native name: Yumurtalık Adası
- Location within Turkey

Geography
- Location: Mediterranean Sea
- Coordinates: 36°46′09″N 35°47′49″E

Administration
- Turkey
- İl (province): Adana Province
- İlçe: Yumurtalık

Yumurtalık Island (also known as Atlas Island) is a small Mediterranean island in Yumurtalık ilçe (district) of Adana Province, Turkey. The midpoint of the island is at 36°46′09″N 35°47′49″E. It is situated about 300 metres (980 ft) to the east of the port.

Its surface area is about 6,000 square metres (65,000 sq ft). There is a small castle in the north of the island. The castle was built in the 11th century, during the late Byzantine or Cilician Armenia era. It faces the castle in the main land (Aegeae). It was an auxiliary unit of the port.

Sometimes the island is also called Kızkalesi with the very same story of the Kızkalesi (castle) in Mersin Province.
