= Isola Razzoli Lighthouse =

Isola Razzoli
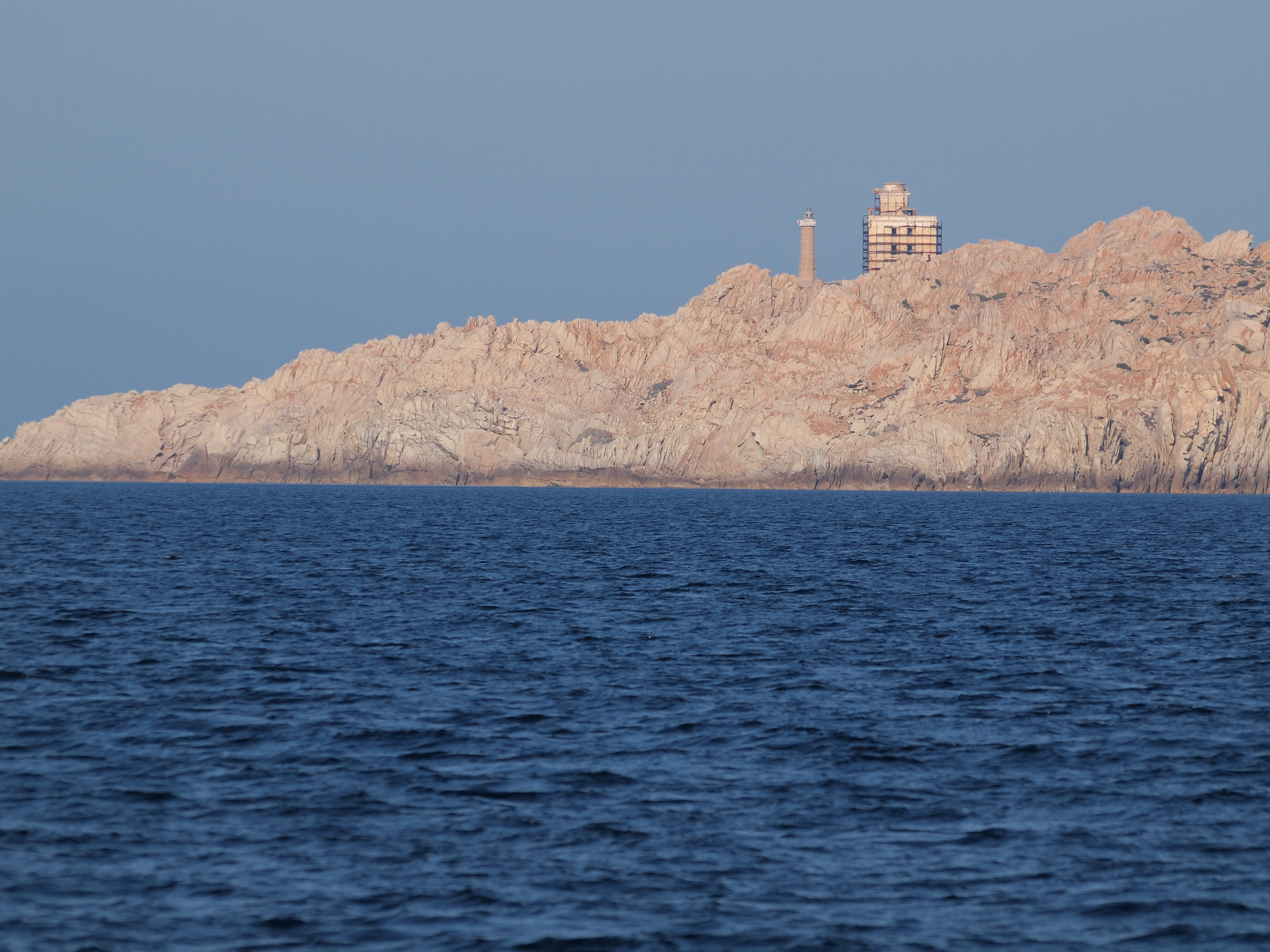
- Isola Razzoli Lighthouse
- Location: Isola Razzoli; Maddalena archipelago Sardinia; Italy
- Coordinates: 41°18′26″N 9°20′24″E

Tower
- Constructed: 1845 (first)
- Foundation: concrete base
- Construction: stone tower (current)
- Automated: yes
- Height: 12 metres (39 ft)
- Shape: cylindrical tower with balcony and lantern
- Markings: unpainted stone tower, white lantern, grey metallic lantern dome
- Power source: solar power
- Operator: Marina Militare
- Fog signal: no

Light
- First lit: 1974 (current)
- Deactivated: 1969 (first)
- Focal height: 77 metres (253 ft)
- Lens: Type OR S6
- Intensity: main: 250 W reserve: MBR-300L LED
- Range: main: 19 nautical miles (35 km; 22 mi) reserve: 19 nautical miles (35 km; 22 mi)
- Characteristic: Fl WR 2.5s.
- Italy no.: 1000 E.F.

Isola Razzoli Lighthouse (Italian: Faro di Isola Razzoli) is an active lighthouse located on an islet, 2.45 kilometres (1.52 mi) long, in the Maddalena archipelago. The lighthouse is the northernmost in Sardinia, on the eastern approach to the Strait of Bonifacio, and is at 7.42 kilometres (4.61 mi) from the French Lavezzi archipelago. The island is in the municipality of La Maddalena on the Tyrrhenian Sea.

== Description ==
The first lighthouse was built in 1858 and consisted of a masonry quadrangular tower, 12 metres (39 ft) high, with balcony and lantern atop a 2-storey keeper's house. The tower and the lantern were painted in white, the lantern dome in grey metallic. The lighthouse was abandoned when it started to ruin and was understood that was too much expensive to renovate it. In 2007 a European Commission granted funds for a partial renovation of the building, but it seem that most of the work is to be done. The current and active lighthouse was built in 1974 and consists of a stone tapered cylindrical tower, 12 metres (39 ft) high, with balcony and lantern. The tower is unpainted, the balcony is white and the lantern dome in grey metallic. The light is positioned at 77 metres (253 ft) above sea level and emits one white or red flash, depending on the directions, in a 2.5 seconds period visible up to a distance of 19 nautical miles (35 km; 22 mi). The lighthouse is completely automated, powered by a solar unit and managed by the Arcipelago di La Maddalena National Park with the identification code number 1000 E.F.

== See also ==
- List of lighthouses in Italy
