= Akdere, Silifke =

Settlement in Turkey

Akdere
- Neighbourhood
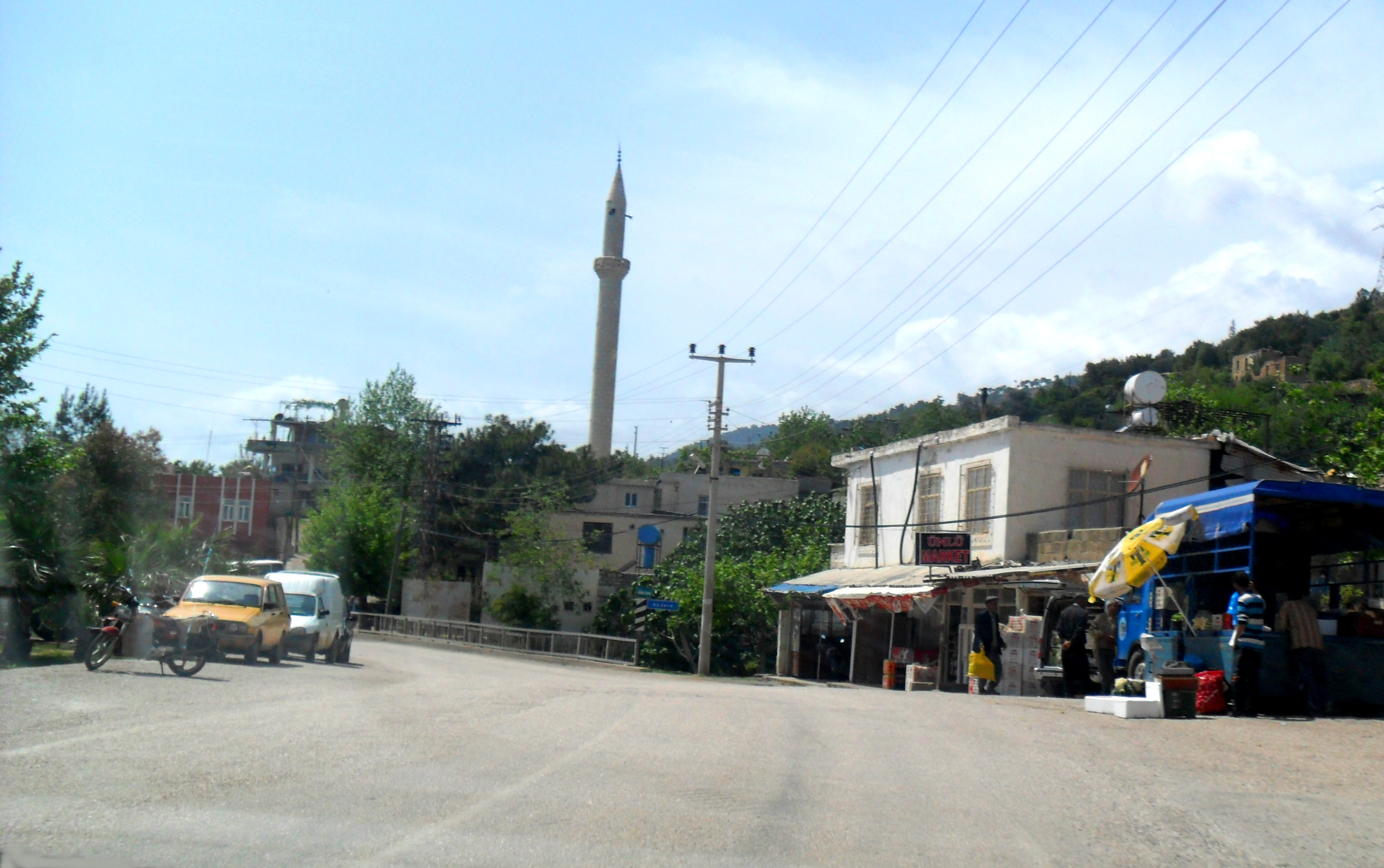

- Location within Turkey
- Coordinates: 36°15′N 33°45′E
- Country: Turkey
- Province: Mersin
- District: Silifke
- Elevation: 120 m (390 ft)
- Population (2022): 1,268
- Time zone: UTC+3 (TRT)
- Postal code: 33900
- Area code: 0324

Akdere is a neighbourhood in the municipality and district of Silifke, Mersin Province, Turkey. Its population is 1,268 (2022). Before the 2013 reorganisation, it was a town (belde).

== Geography ==
Akdere is in a rural area of the Silifke district, which itself is a part of the Mersin Province. The distance to Silifke is 33 kilometres (21 mi) and to Mersin is 115 kilometres (71 mi). Akdere is in a narrow valley which runs parallel to the Mediterranean Sea coast. Although the geodesic distance to seaside is about 3 kilometres (1.9 mi), the town is not considered a coastal town.

== Economy ==
The main economic activity in Akdere is agriculture, especially forced crop agriculture.
