= Plavnik =

Island in the Adriatic Sea

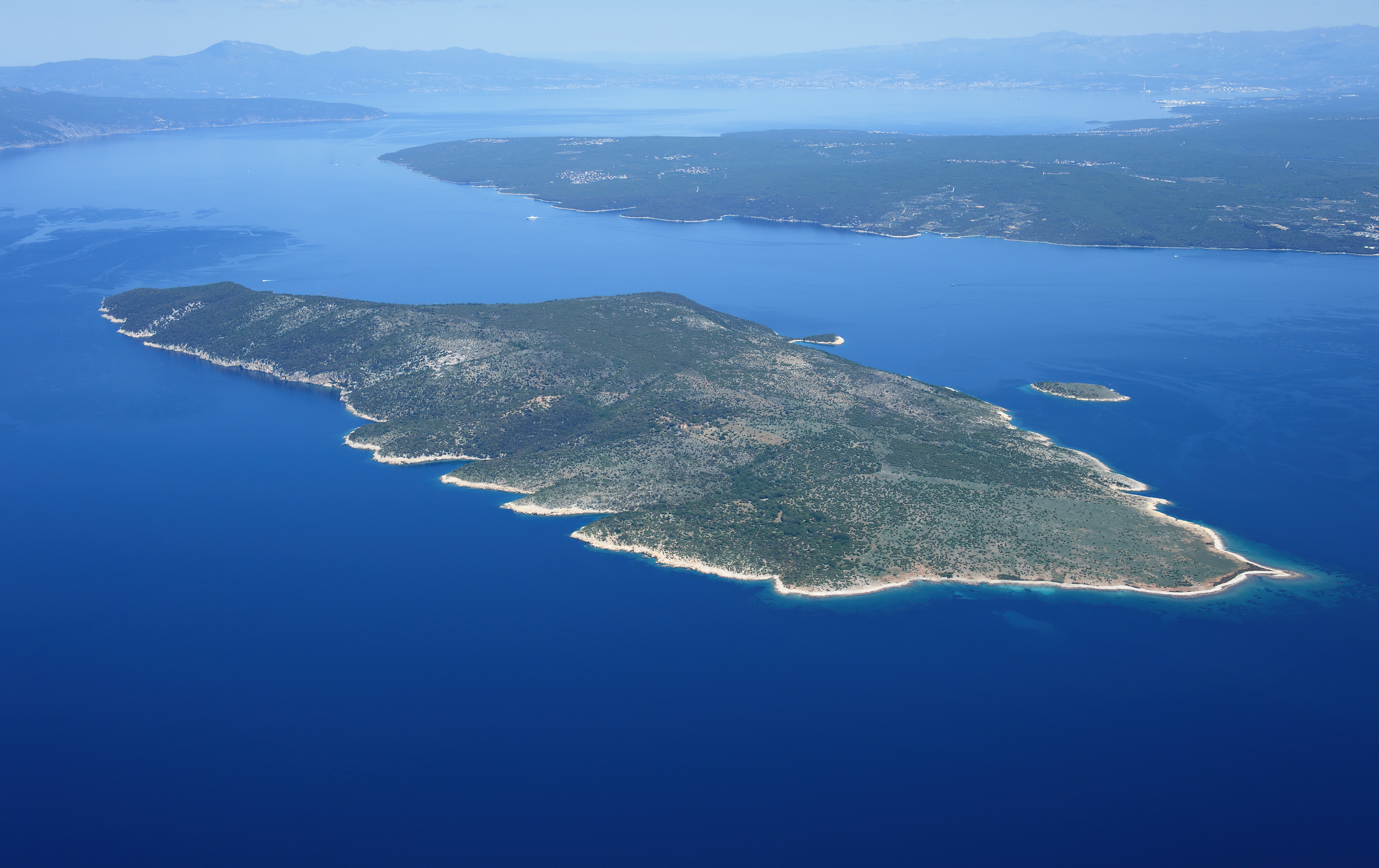

- Location within Croatia
- Interactive map of Plavnik

Geography
- Coordinates: 44°58′02″N 14°31′30″E
- Archipelago: Kvarner Gulf
- Area: 8.64 km^{2} (3.34 sq mi)
- Highest point: 194 m

Administration
- Croatia
- County: Primorje-Gorski Kotar County
- Municipality: Krk (town)

Demographics
- Population: 0 (2011)

Plavnik is an unpopulated island in the Adriatic Sea, belonging to Croatia located between the Central Straits and the Kvarner Bay. The Krusija Channel cuts it off from the eastern coast of the island of Cres. This channel is the shortest route from the Adriatic Sea through the islands to Rijeka. A lighthouse, established in 1890, sits at the northwestern point of the islet, marking the east side of the narrowest opening of the Krusija Channel.

== Geography ==
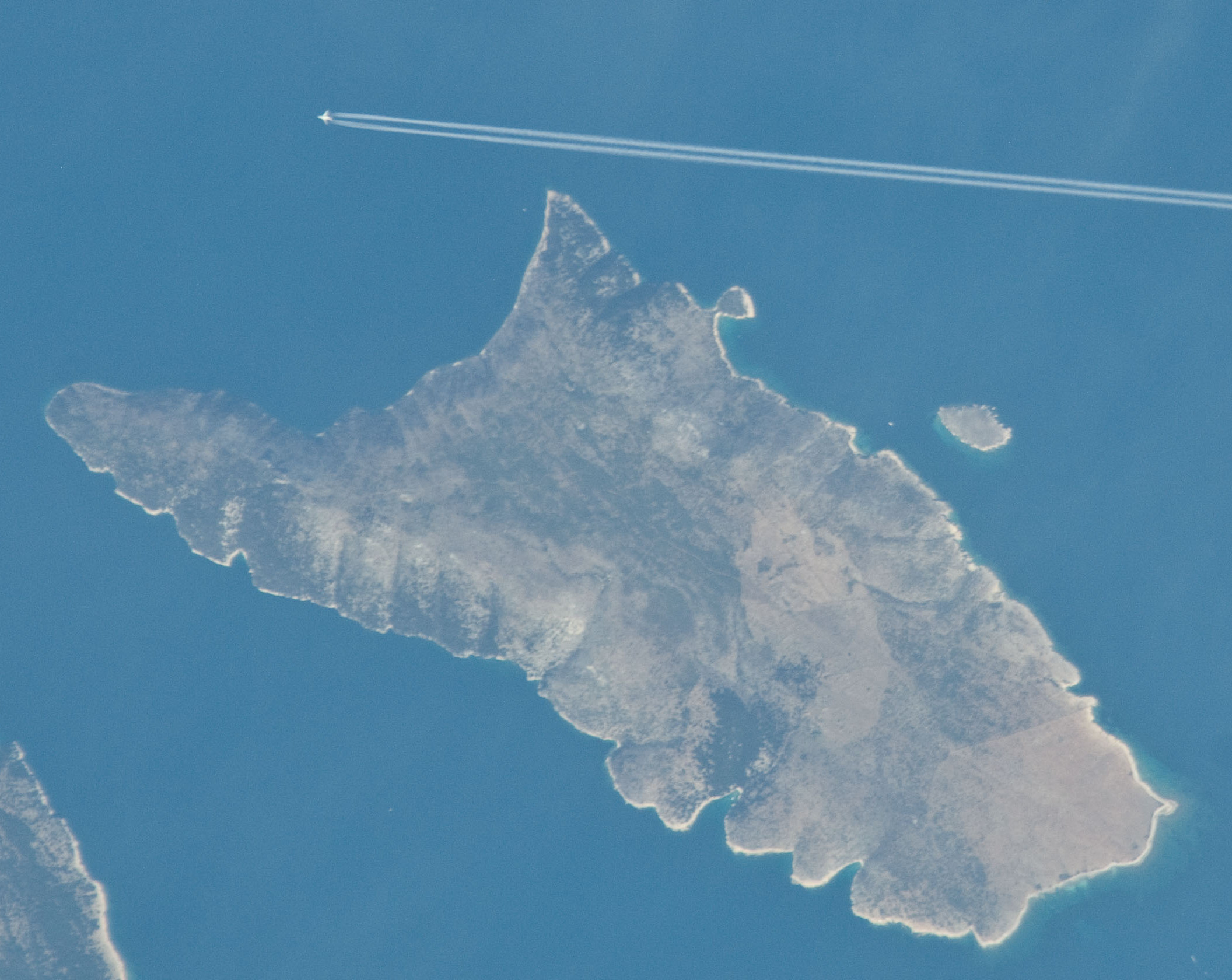
satellite photo of Plavnik with surrounding area

While covering an area of 8.64 km^{2}, the island has a length of 6.3 kilometres (3.9 miles) and a width of up to 2.3 km (1.4 miles). Its highest elevation is 194 metres (636 feet). On the northern and north-eastern sides, the coastline is partially steep. Two islets that make up the Kormati island (Otok Kormati), lie to the southeast of Plavnik. In the middle of the straits between these islands and Plavnik, the sea depth is about 9 metres (30 feet).

== Flora and fauna ==
Plavnik is home to birds such as the wheateaters, pheasant, and white-headed vulture. Hares are common as well. As of 2010, the islet is in the process of being declared a zoological and botanical reserve.

== Gallery ==
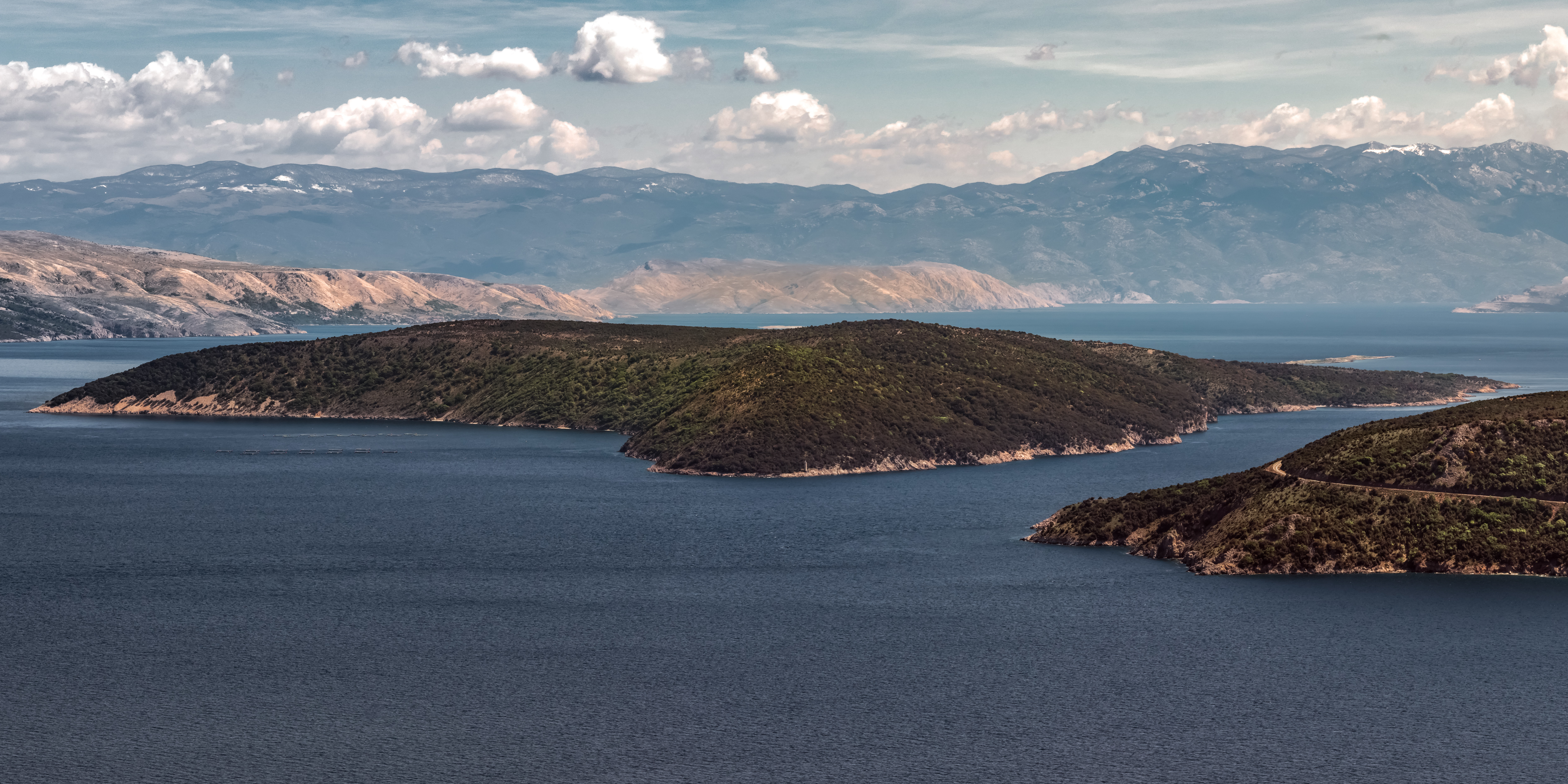
View of Plavnik from south of Vodice

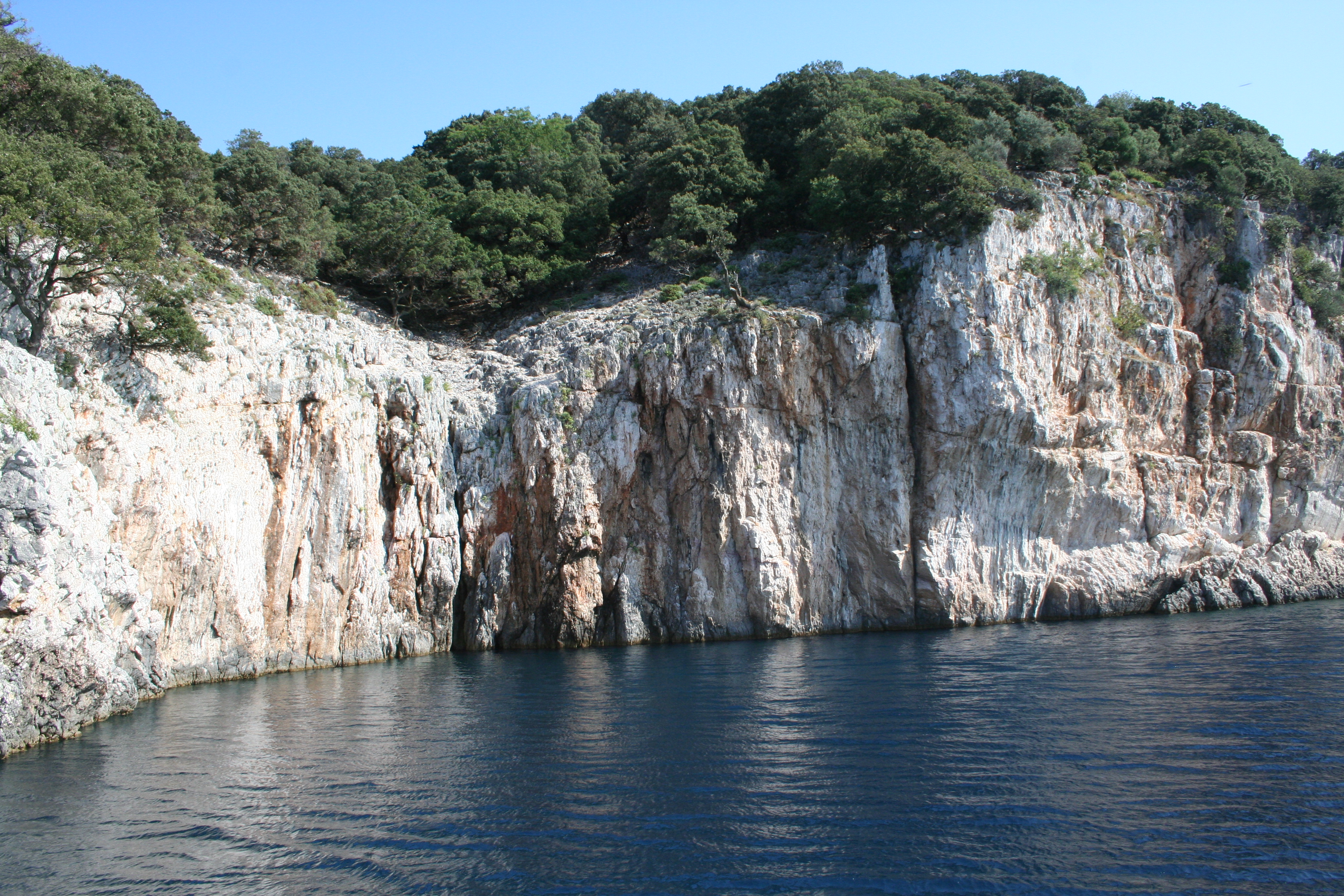
Cliffs

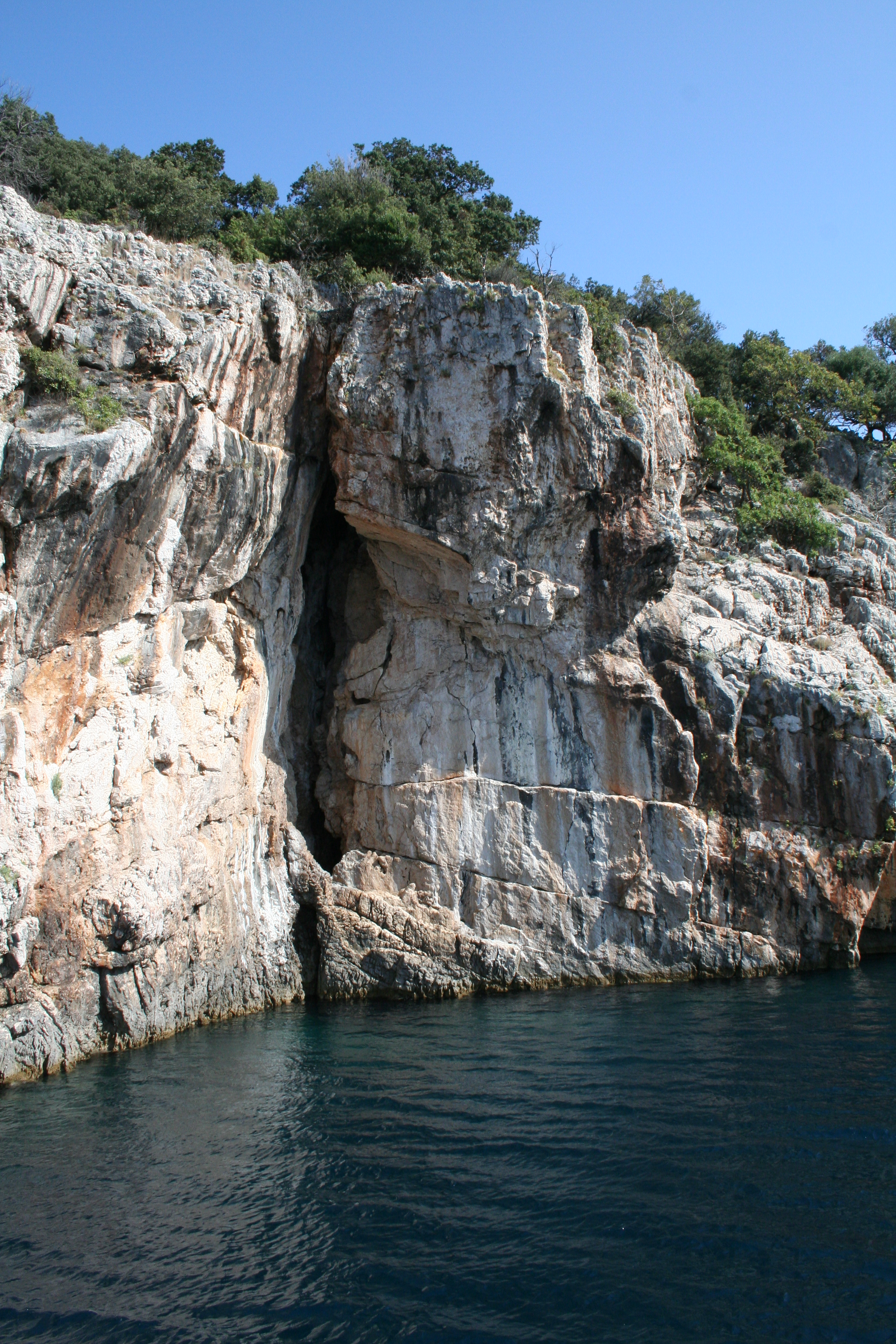
Fracture

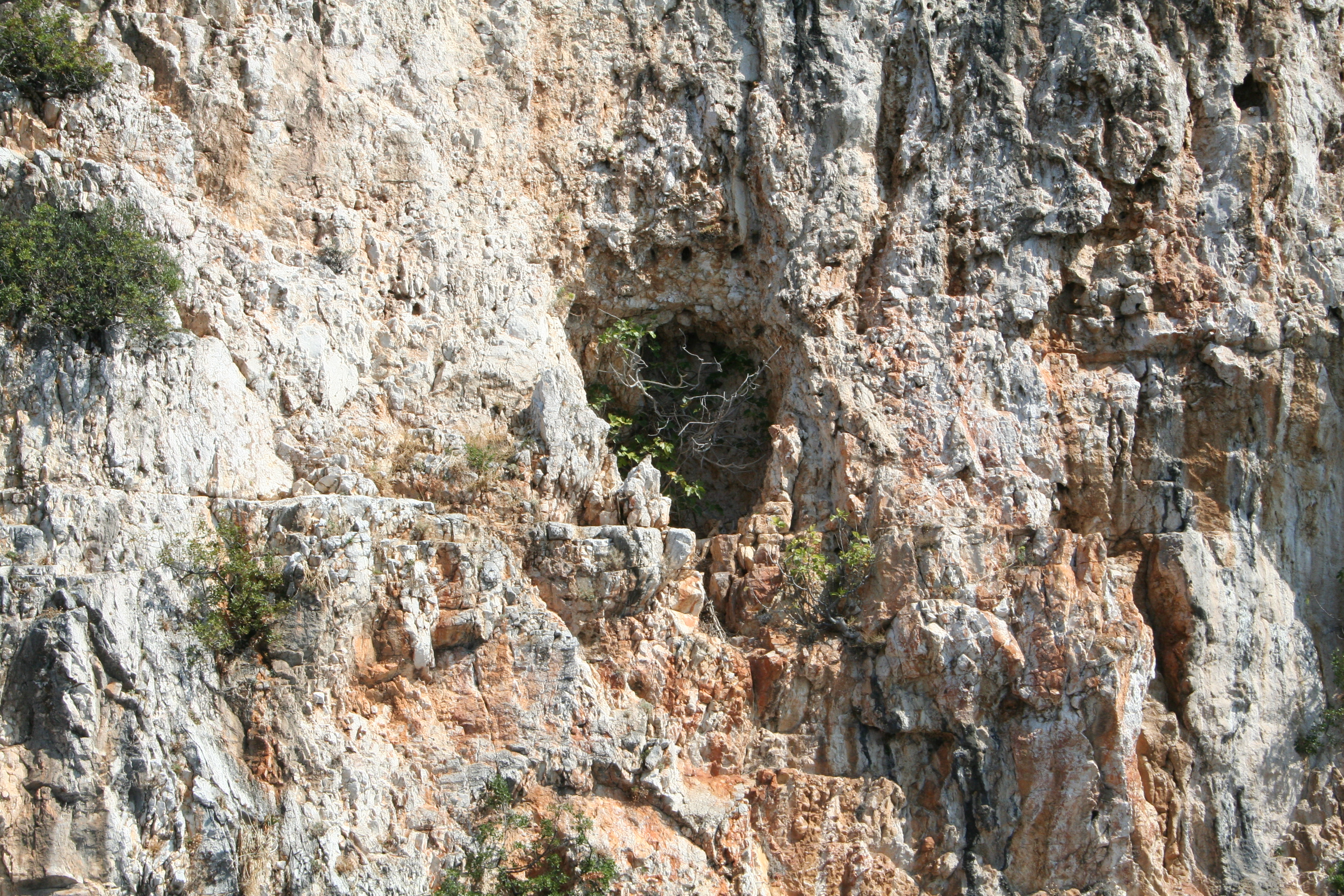
Rock shelter

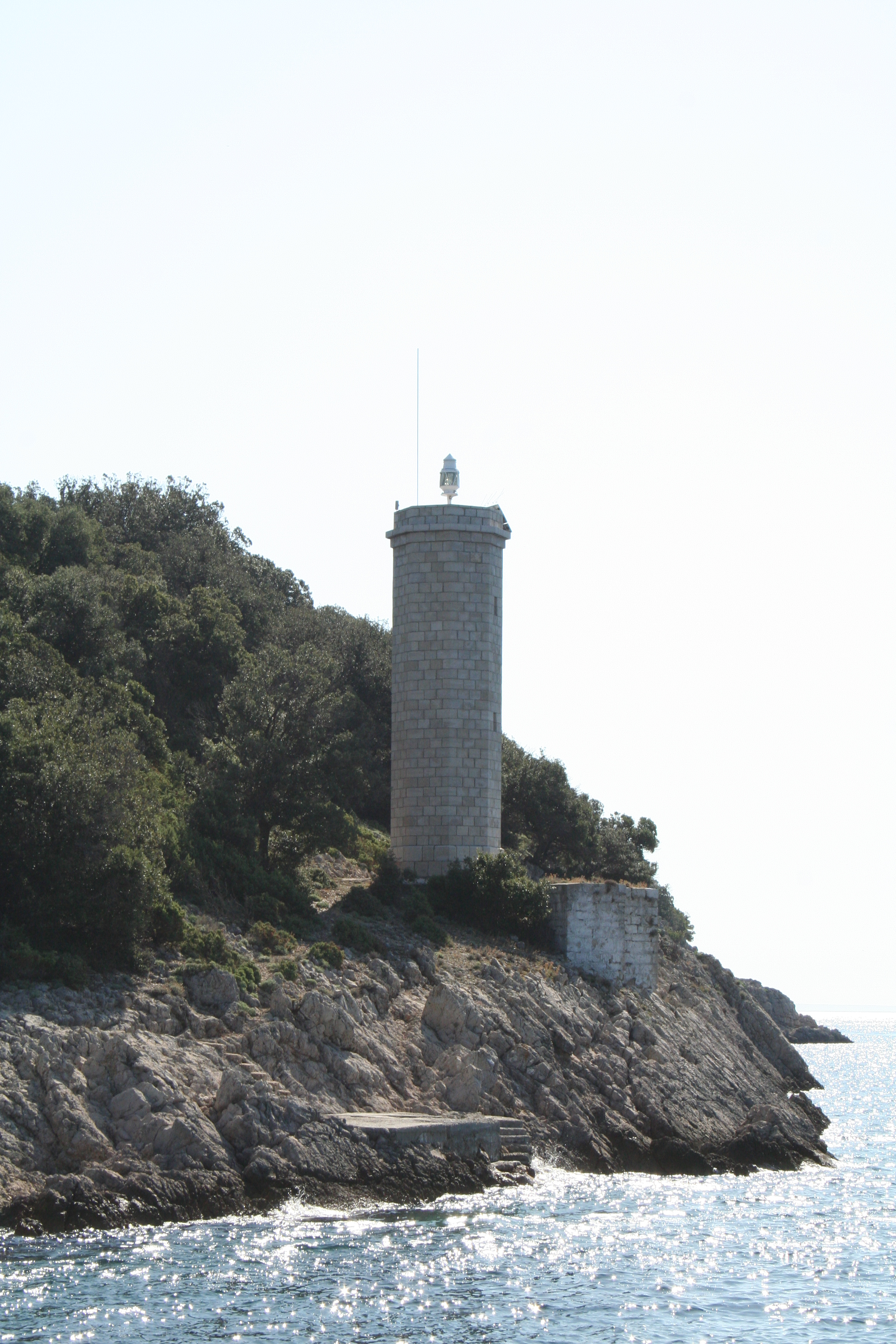
Lighthouse
