= Bozyazı Island =

Islet in Bozyazı, Mersin, Turkey

Native name: Bozyazı Adası
- Location within Turkey

Geography
- Location: Mediterranean Sea
- Coordinates: 36°05′45″N 32°58′33″E

Administration
- Turkey
- İl (province): Mersin Province
- İlçe: Bozyazı

Bozyazı Island is a small Mediterranean island in Turkey.

The island faces Bozyazı ilçe (district) of Mersin Province at 36°05′45″N 32°58′33″E. Its distance to shore is only 200 metres (660 ft) and in 1982 a road was constructed between the main land and the island by embankment. But in 2009 the artificial connection was abandoned.

Although it is currently uninhabited there are ruins on the island. The island was once a part of the Nagidos ancient city. However, during the Cilician pirates age the city lost its former importance and the population mostly concentrated in the island then called "Nagidudos" or "Tagiduda".

The total area of the island is about 11,500 square metres (124,000 sq ft). According to the Ministry of Forestry the island is declared an archaeological site .
