= İmamuşağı =

- Neighbourhood
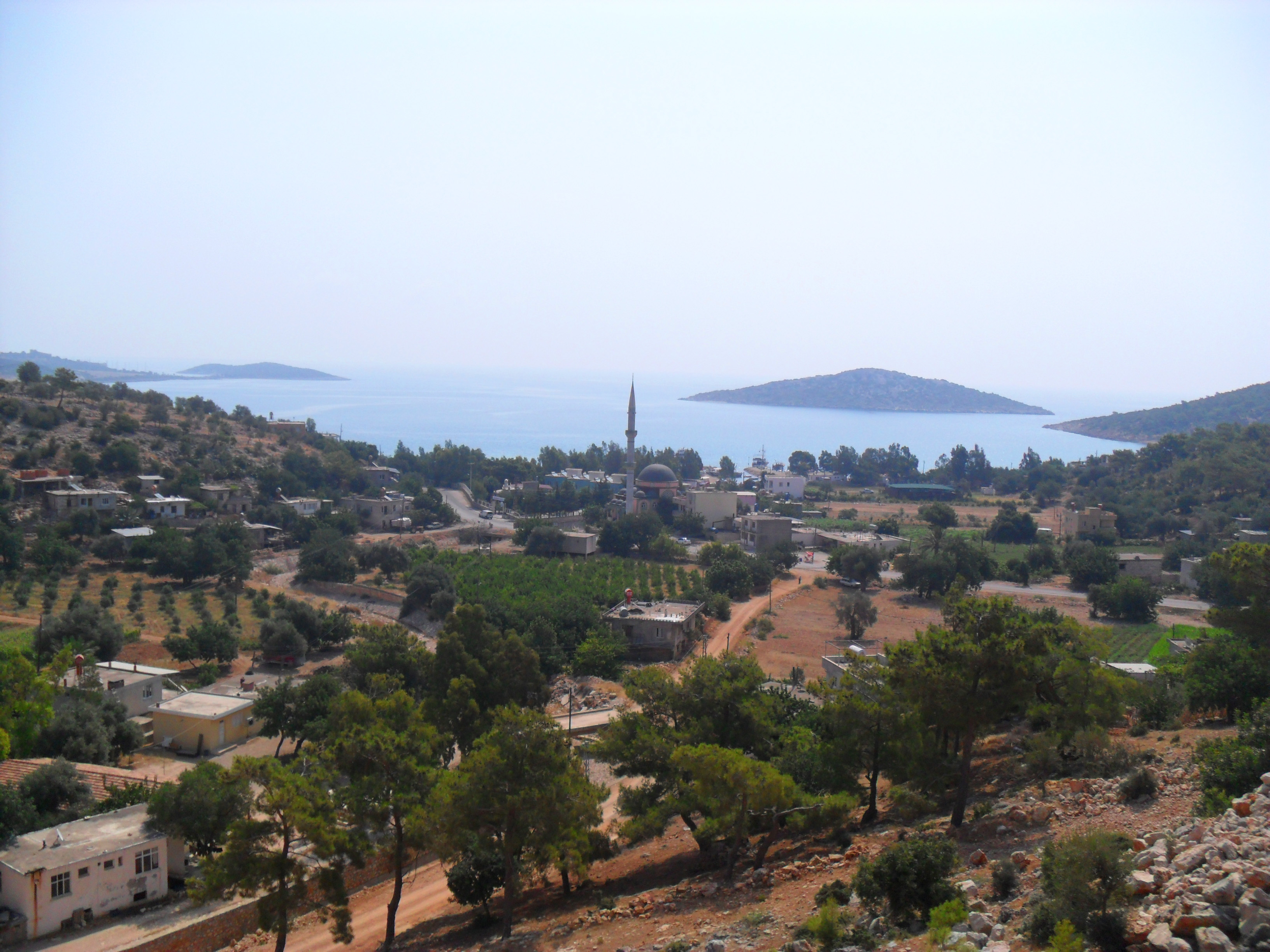
- Boğsak

- Location within Turkey
- Coordinates: 36°18′N 33°46′E
- Country: Turkey
- Province: Mersin
- District: Silifke
- Elevation: 430 m (1,410 ft)
- Population (2022): 634
- Time zone: UTC+3 (TRT)
- Postal code: 33940
- Area code: 0324

İmamuşağı is a neighbourhood in the municipality and district of Silifke, Mersin Province, Turkey. Its population is 634 (2022). The village is situated in the southern slopes of Toros Mountains. Its distance to Silifke is 20 kilometres (12 mi) and to Mersin is 105 kilometres (65 mi). Main economic activities of the village are farming and animal breeding. Olive and locust are the main crops. İmamuşağı is a mountain village. But it is a dispersed settlement and one of its neighbourhoods named Boğsak is at the sea side. A hamlet, it is a popular seaside resort for Mersin residents. There are also beaches and historical castles around Boğsak.

== See also ==
- Boğsak Islet
