= Drvenik Veliki =

Settlement in Split-Dalmatia County, Croatia

- Settlement
- Interactive map of Drvenik Veliki
- Location of Drvenik Veliki in Croatia
- Coordinates: 43°26′39″N 16°08′44″E
- Country: Croatia
- County: Split-Dalmatia County
- City: Trogir

Area
  - Total: 12.2 km^{2} (4.7 sq mi)

Population (2021)
  - Total: 170
  - Density: 14/km^{2} (36/sq mi)
- Time zone: UTC+1 (CET)
  - Summer (DST): UTC+2 (CEST)
- Postal code: 21225 Drvenik Veliki
- Area code: +385 (0)21

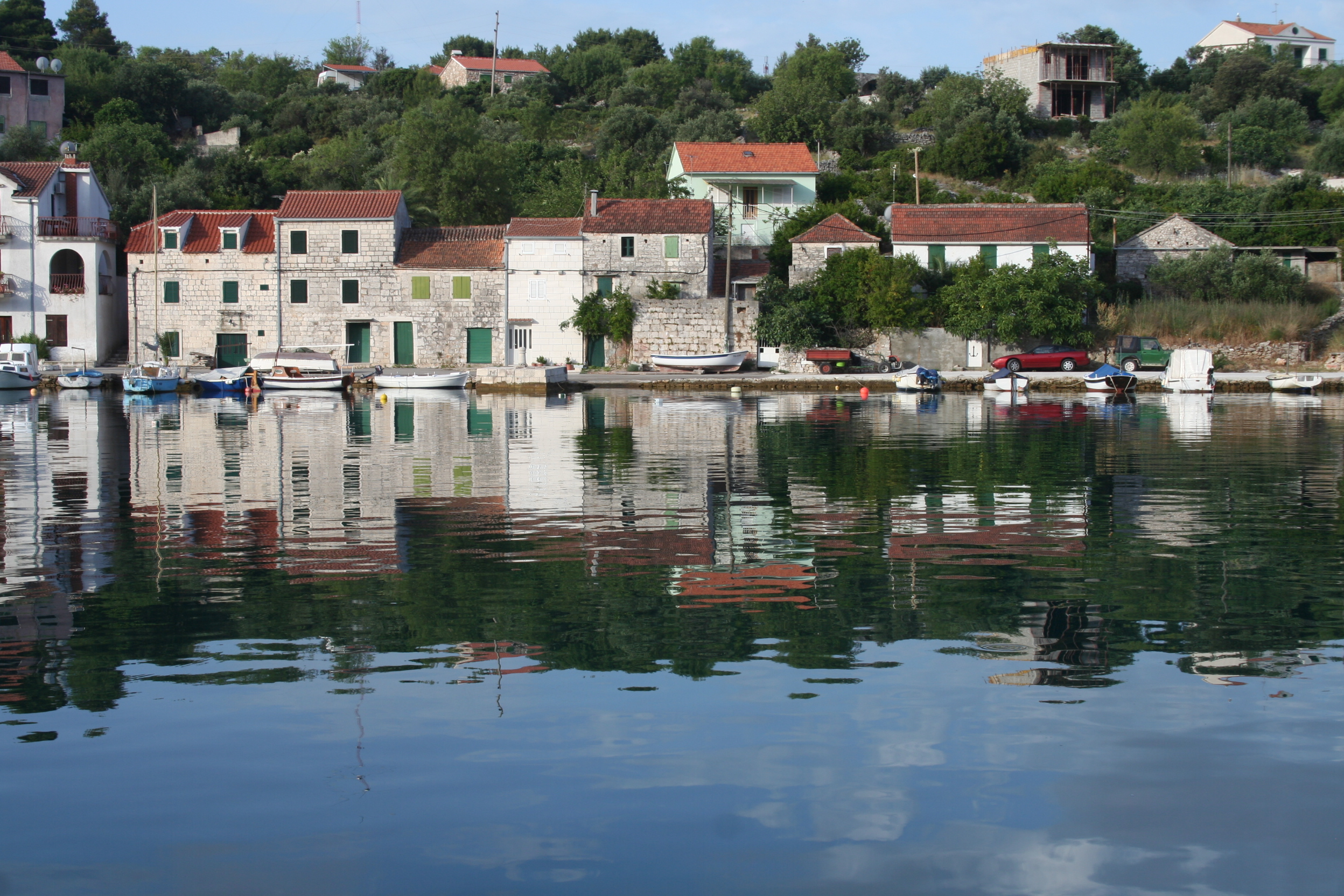
Island Drvenik Veli.

Drvenik Veliki is a settlement in the City of Trogir in Croatia. In 2021, its population was 170.

== Demographics ==
Drvenik Veliki: Population trends 1857–2021
v

population	476	1406	549	684	754	914	1069	925	908	878	729	469	229	145	168	150	170
	1857	1869	1880	1890	1900	1910	1921	1931	1948	1953	1961	1971	1981	1991	2001	2011	2021

Sources: Croatian Bureau of Statistics publications
