= Sant'Angelo della Polvere =

Italian island

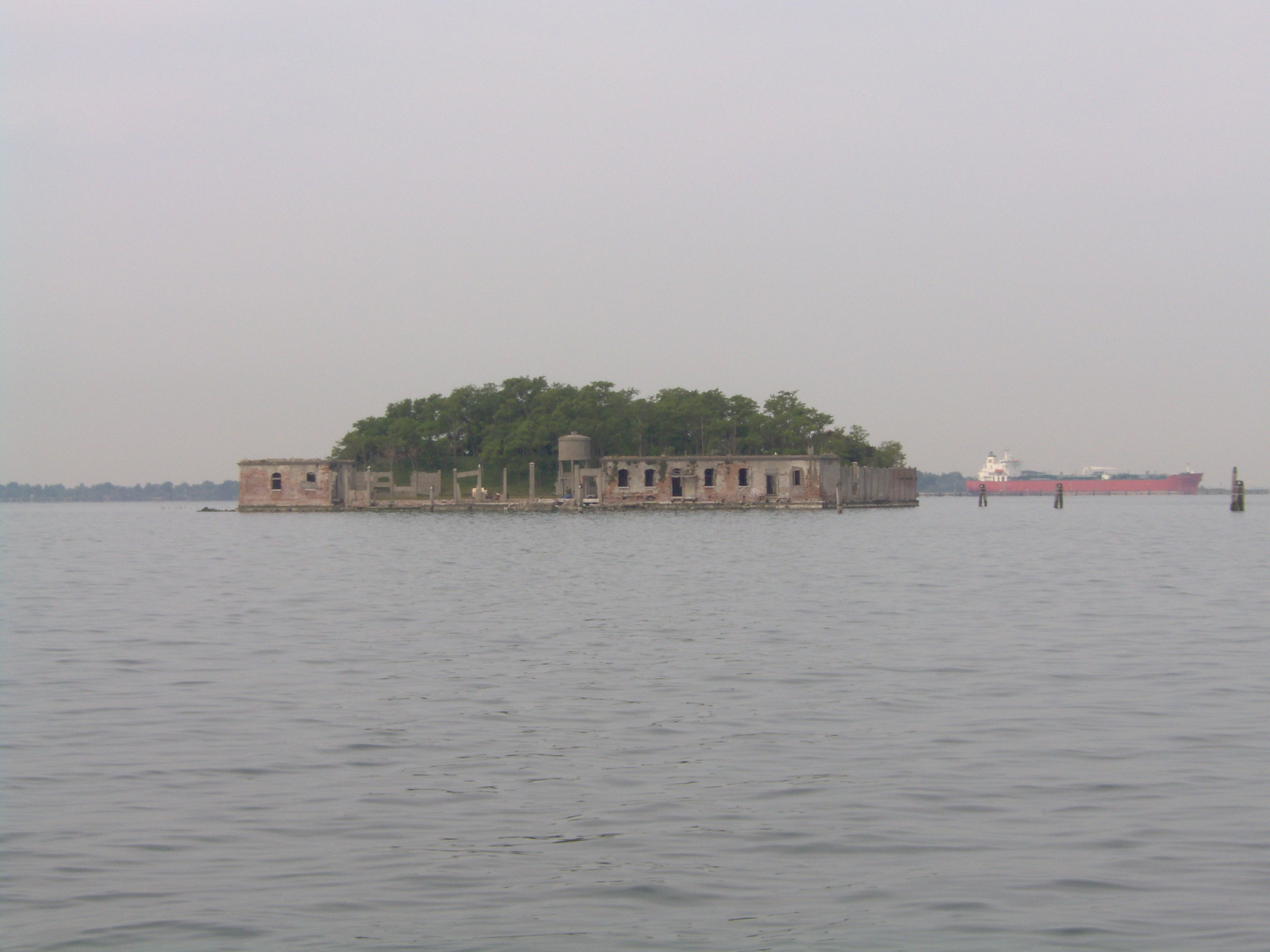
- Sant'Angelo della Polvere

- Location within Venetian Lagoon

Geography
- Coordinates: 45.408611°N 12.283333°E
- Adjacent to: Venetian Lagoon

Administration
- Italy
- Region: Veneto
- Province: Province of Venice

Sant'Angelo della Polvere (originally called Sant'Angelo di Concordia, later Sant'Angelo di Contorta and Sant'Angelo di Caotorta) is an island in the Venetian Lagoon, in the Contorta channel, not far from the Giudecca and the island of San Giorgio in Alga. An Italian state property, it has a surface of 0.53 ha and is home to four buildings.

== History ==
From 1060 it housed a church and monastery initially under the Benedictines, first male and then female; the latter dedicated the monastery to St. Michael Archangel, whence the name. In 1474 the nuns were forced to move to the monastery of the Cross in the Giudecca, due to their unruly behaviour, and from 1518 the complex was held by the Carmelites of Mantua and Brescia.

In 1555 the island took its present name, when the Senate of the Republic of Venice decided to depopulate it due to its unhealthy air and to install in it a gunpowder depot. On 29 August 1689 lightning struck the island, destroying the whole complex. The island remained abandoned for several years. 18th century maps indicate the presence of some military installations, and it remained a military site until World War II; since then it has remained unused.

== Sources ==
- Crovato, Giorgio; Maurizio Crovato (1978). Isole abbandonate della Laguna - Com'erano e come sono. Padua: Liviana.
