= Antimilos =

Island in Greece

Native name: Αντίμηλος
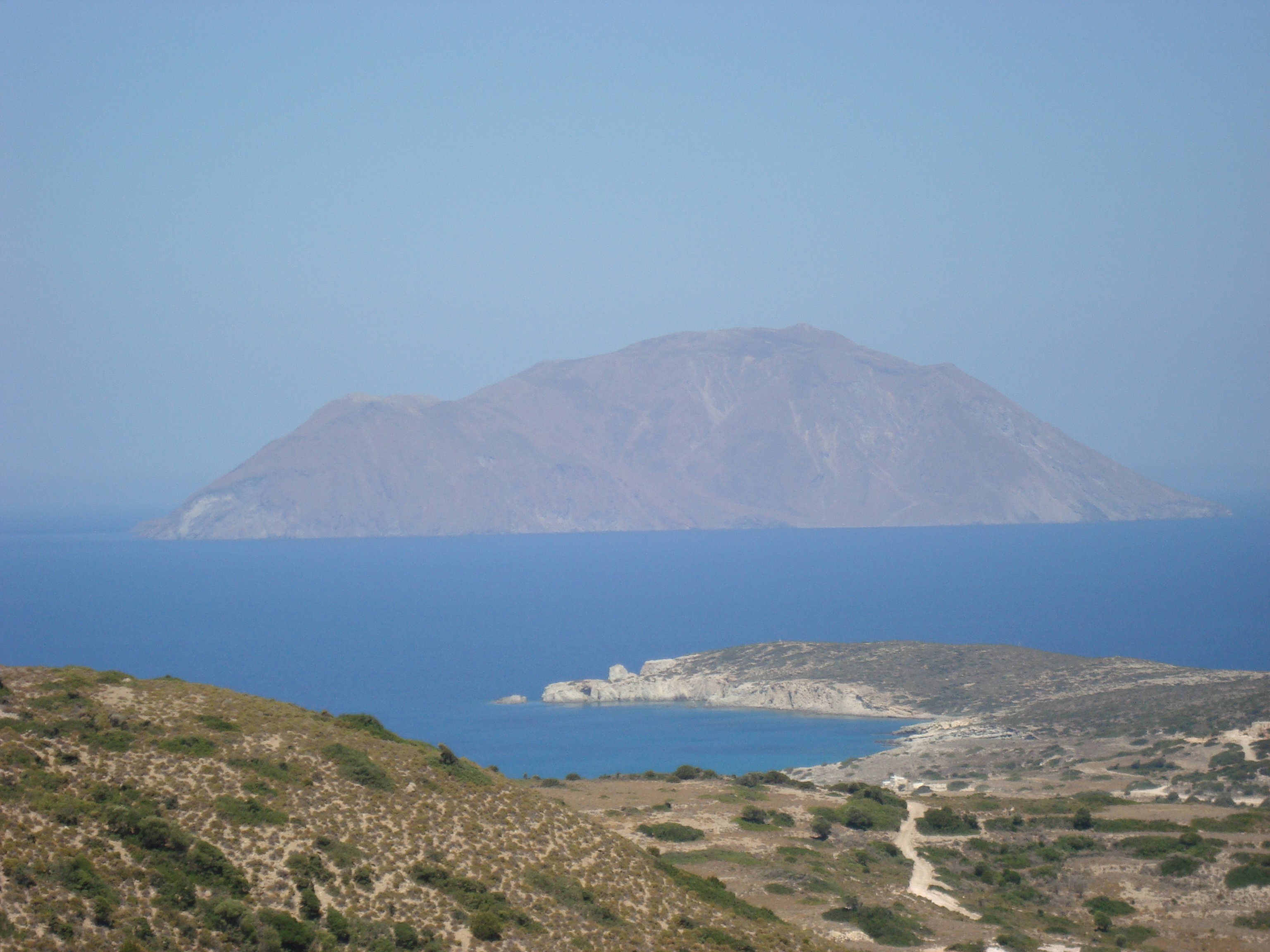
- View from Milos in August 2014.

- Location within Greece

Geography
- Coordinates: 36°47′13″N 24°14′19″E
- Archipelago: Cyclades
- Highest elevation: 671 m (2201 ft)

Administration
- Greece
- Region: South Aegean
- Regional unit: Milos

Demographics
- Population: 0 (2001)

Antimilos (Greek: Αντίμηλος; Modern Greek pronunciation: [anˈdimilos]) is a Greek island in the Cyclades group, 13 miles (21 kilometres) northwest of Milos. Administratively, it is part of the municipality of Milos. Antimilos is an uninhabited mass of trachyte (671 m height), often called Erimomilos (Desert Milos). It is a volcanic island and the crater is still obvious. Ancient inhabitants transformed the crater into an open rain tank. On the island lives a rare variation of the common goat called Capra aegagrus pictus. It is similar but not the same as the Cretan goat known as "kri-kri" (Capra aegagrus creticus).

== History ==
According to an interpretation of Homer's Odyssey, it is the island of the sun god Helios, where Odysseus's companions slaughtered the sacred cattle of the sun god. Previously, the island was also known by the name Ephyra (Ancient Greek: Έφυρα) or Ephora (Έφορα, meaning "watchtower"), because one could observe the sea from its highest point over long distances.

Settlement in prehistoric times can be assumed due to remains of walls and arrowheads made of obsidian found on the island. Remains of a cistern probably of Roman or early Christian origin have also been found.
