= Columbretes Islands =

Columbretes Les Columbretes
- Islands
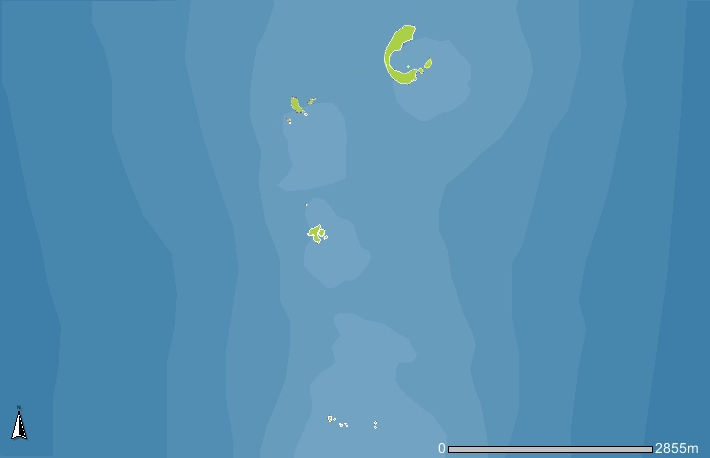
- Columbretes Islands map

- Location in Spain
- Coordinates: 39°53′53″N 0°41′07″E
- Country: Spain
- Autonomous community: Valencia
- Province: Castellón
- Comarca: Plana Alta
- Judicial district: Castellón de la Plana

Area
  - Total: 0.19 km^{2} (0.073 sq mi)
- Highest elevation: 67 m (220 ft)

Population (2009)
  - Total: no permanent population
- Time zone: UTC+1 (CET)
  - Summer (DST): UTC+2 (CEST)
- Postal code: 12100

The Columbretes Islands (Valencian: Les Columbretes, IPA: [les kolumˈbɾetes] or Els Columbrets (Note: The word Columbretes is feminine, as is the word Illa (Island), whereas Columbrets is masculine, as the word Illot (Islet). Catalan grammar requires both words to match in gender.), IPA: [els kolumˈbɾets]) are a group of small uninhabited islets of volcanic origin, in the Mediterranean Sea, 49 kilometres (30 miles) off Oropesa del Mar. Administratively they belong to Castellón de la Plana in the Valencian Community.

The main islets are Illa Grossa, La Ferrera, La Foradada and El Carallot. The total emerged area of all four is around 0.19 km^{2} (0.07 sq mi) and the highest point is 67 metres (220 feet) above sea level. Illa Grossa, by far the largest, is the northernmost island of the group. It stands in the place of an ancient crater and shows a distinctive semi-circular pattern. There are no buildings on it, except for a 19th-century lighthouse, a jetty and the staff quarters used by the biologists working in the wildlife reserve.

== Geology ==
The cone forming the Columbrete Grande was formed during four volcanic episodes from 1.0 to 0.3 million years ago. It consists of alkaline magmatism associated with the opening (rifting) of the Valencia Trough. Volcanism in other areas of the Valencia Trough coast dates between 10 million years and the present and they show a transition from calc-alkaline to alkaline signature.

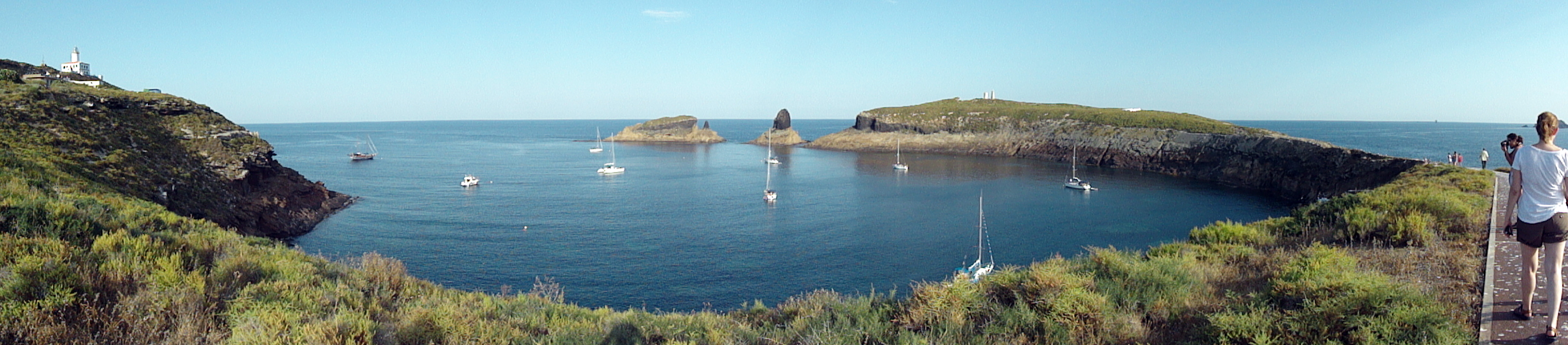
Panoramic view of the bay of the largest island.

== History ==
These islands were known by Greeks and Romans from ancient times. Writers such as Strabo or Pliny the Elder cited the astonishing number of snakes inhabiting them. The names Ophiusa and Colubraria by which they were named (meaning serpent in Greek and Latin, respectively) refer to that fact. The islands owe their present name to "Coluber", the Latin word for "snake".

After a lighthouse was built on Illa Grossa in the mid-19th century, a few people were settled on it. The small community looked after maintenance of the lighthouse and helped to deter smugglers who used the islets as a refuge. Farm animals including pigs were introduced. This, combined with aggressive practices such as the burning of the original bushy vegetation of the lighthouse island (partly for agricultural uses and also to deliberately deprive the numerous endemic snub-nosed vipers of their natural habitat), caused the snakes to become extinct by the end of the 19th century. The only testimony of their past abundance that remains today is a stuffed viper from the Columbretes in Madrid's Natural Science Museum.

== Island groups ==
All islets and skerries are separated into four groups, all of them related to their position to one another:

- The islands in bold are the largest and most important ones of each group.
- The islands highlighted in cyan are skerries.

L'Illa Grossa group (14,30 ha) Grup de l'Illa Grossa	La Ferrera group (1,95 ha) Grup de la Ferrera	La Foradada group (2,21 ha) Grup de la Foradada	El Carallot group (Note: This group is also known as El Bergantín in Spanish.) (0,49 ha) Grup del Carallot
**Columbret Gran (Illa Grossa)** (13,33 ha); Trenca Timons (40 m^{2}); Mancolibre (0,56 ha); Senyoreta (0,14 ha); Mascarat (0,27 ha)	**La Ferrera** (Malaspina) (1,53 ha); Espinosa (0,03 ha); Bauzà (0,25 ha); Valdés (0,04 ha); Navarrete (0,10 ha); Laja Navarrete (50 m^{2}); El Ciscar; El Fidalgo	**La Foradada** (1,63 ha); Lobo (Foradadeta) (0,47 ha); Méndez Núñez (0,11 ha); Pedra Joaquín (20 m^{2}); Jorge Juan	**El Carallot** (Galiano) (0,414 ha); Cerquero (0,03 ha); Xurruca (0,04 ha); Baleato (0,01 ha); Ulloa; Patiño; Luyando; Mendoza; Díaz

== Biosphere reserve ==
Since 1988 the archipelago has been declared a wildlife reserve. It is as an optimal place for the reproductive activities of certain seabirds. The local colony of Audouin's gulls (which is a species listed as Near Threatened globally) is one of the most important in the world and key to the species ongoing recovery in the Spanish Mediterranean. The islets are also home for one of the major stable populations of Eleonora's falcon in Spain. Besides, the islets are very important during spring and autumn bird migrations, since many different species who follow the Spanish Mediterranean coast in the course of their migration use them as a brief stop in order to rest.

Due to its isolation, the islands are inhabited by an endemic subspecies of small lizard, Podarcis hispanicus atratus. There is also an endemic subspecies of Lobularia maritima in the local flora. After being given the natural park status, pigs were eradicated. Also, the lighthouse is now automatic, which reduces the human presence only to the one of biologists assigned to the park's management.

The submerged area around the islands is as relevant in terms of conservation as the area above the surface. It covers an area of 400 square kilometres (154 sq mi) where an important community of submarine wildlife thrives undisturbed. It became protected as a Marine reserve in 1990.
