= Boğsak Islet =

Island in Turkey

Native name: Boğsak Adası
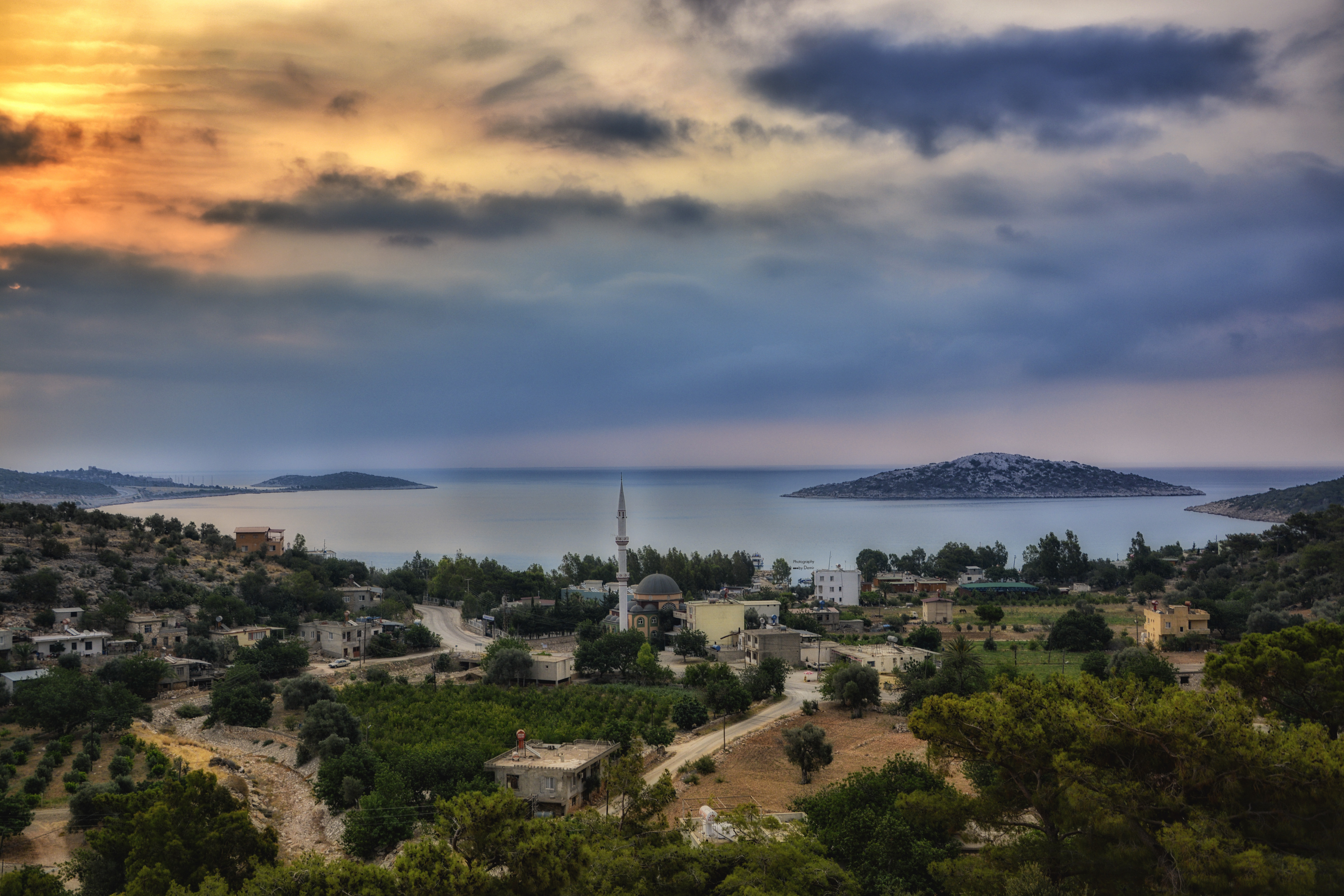
- View of Boğsak with the Islet on the right

- Location within Turkey

Geography
- Location: Mediterranean Sea
- Coordinates: 36°16′02″N 33°49′36″E

Administration
- Turkey
- İl (province): Mersin Province
- İlçe: Silifke

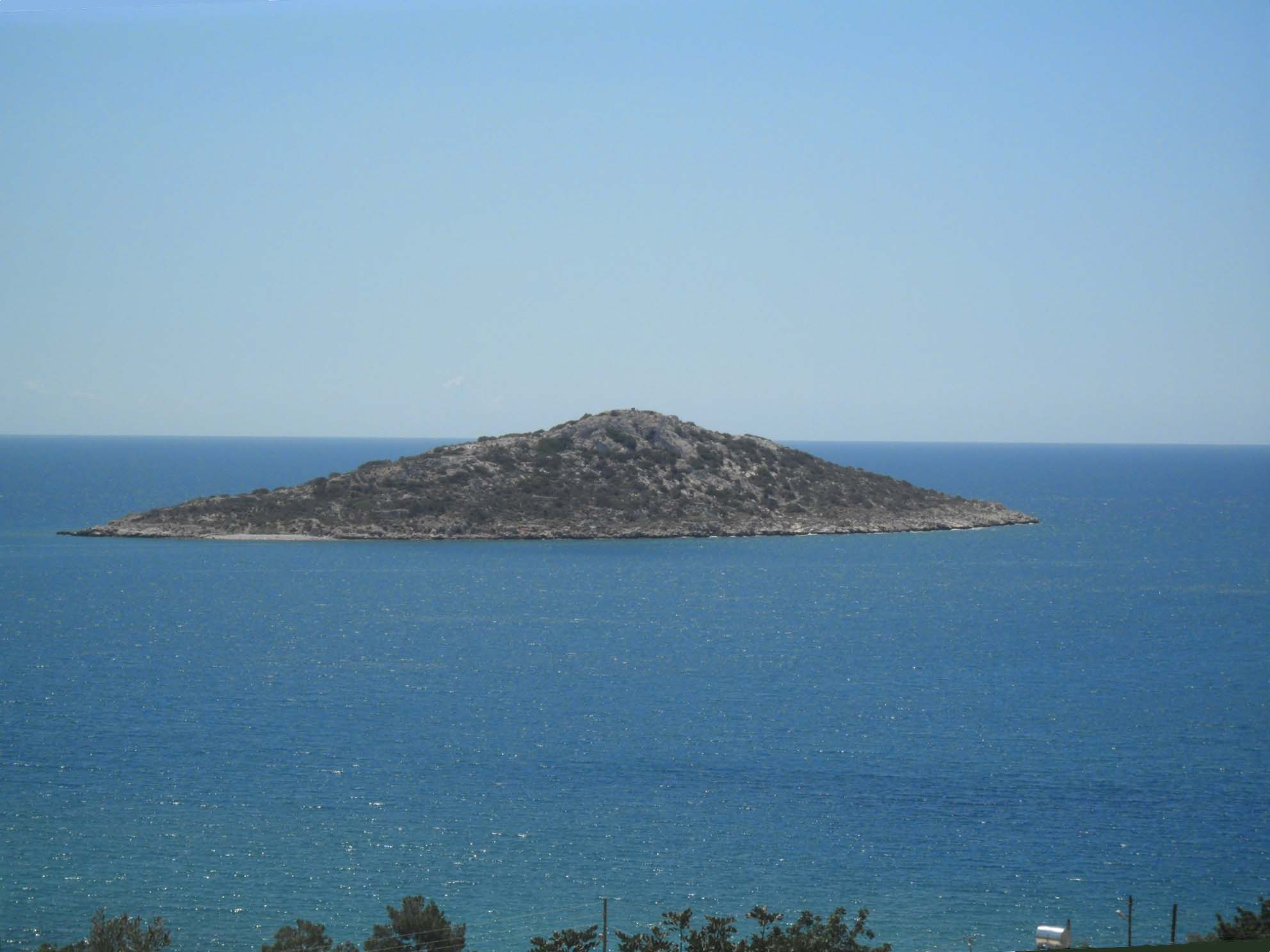
From the mainland (north)

Boğsak (Turkish: Boğsak Adası) is a Mediterranean islet in Mersin Province, Turkey.

== Geography ==
The 7 hectares (17 acres) islet is located 200 metres (660 ft) off shore from the main land facing a small settlement with the same name. Administratively it is a part of İmamuşağı village of Silifke district of Mersin Province. It is at 36°16′02″N 33°49′36″E. The distance from the main land to Silifke is 17 kilometres (11 mi) and to Mersin is 100 kilometres (62 mi).

== History ==
Although there is no settlement on the islet, it was inhabited in the late antiquity. Stadiasmus Maris Magni of the second half of the 3rd century mentions the λιμὴν Νησούλιον (harbor, of the small island) According to an inscription of the 6th century the name of the settlement on the islet was as Άστερήα and it was probably a wealthy village, ruins of which are partially preserved .

== Boğsak Bay ==
Boğsak bay is a bay on Mediterranean coast facing east (i.e., Baoğsak islet) There are some summer houses and hotels on the bay. In the bay and around the island the popular sports activity is diving
