= Illa Grossa =

Island in Spain

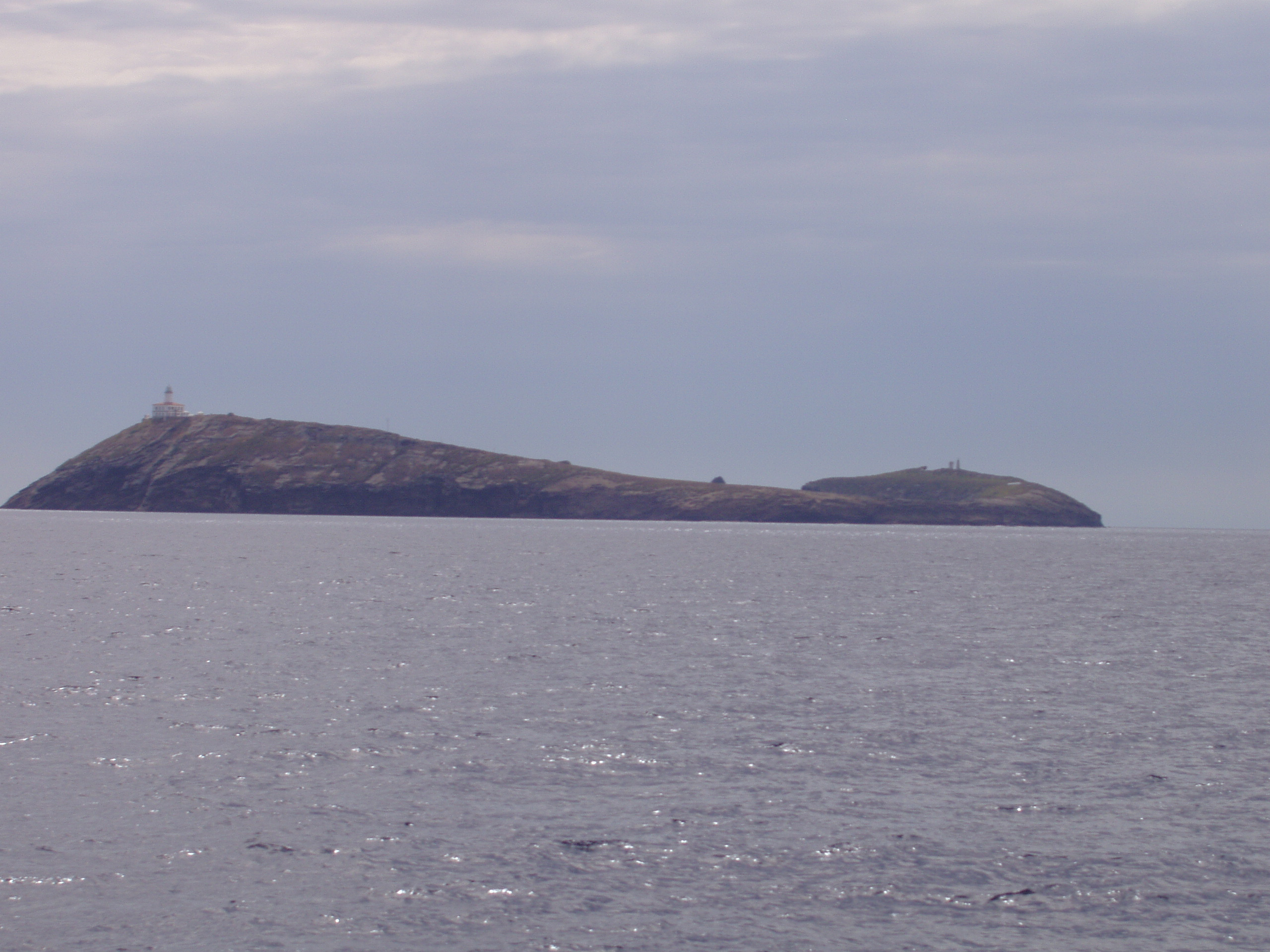
- Illa Grossa with visible lighthouse

- Location in Spain

Geography
- Coordinates: 39°53′50″N 0°41′00″E
- Archipelago: Columbretes Islands
- Adjacent to: Mediterranean Sea
- Area: 0.14 km^{2} (0.054 sq mi)

Administration
- Spain

Illa Grossa, ("Large Island" in Valencian) is the largest island of the Columbretes archipelago of Spain, located in the Mediterranean Sea. It has a surface area of 14 hectares, or 0.05 square miles. It sits 60 km from Costa del Azahar. The island has experienced a rifting process since the lower Miocene, and is characterized by a significant presence of basalt materials. It is the result of a number of craters forming a chain, and its shape resembles the halve of an ellipse with an average diameter of 1 km, with two main elevations. The island's highest point, located in the northern section, is called mount Colibrí or Colibre. Along with the rest of the islands of the archipelago, it belongs to the Columbretes Islands Natural Reserve.

== History ==
The island was used as a refuge by pirates and smugglers. In the mid-19th century, the island was set on fire in order to exterminate the large population of snakes. The snakes were endemic to the islands, and the archipelago's original names (Ophiusa or Columbraria) were given by Greek and Roman sailors due to the abundance of reptiles. In 1859, a lighthouse was built 67 m above sea level, the highest point of the archipelago. In 1895, Ludwig Von Salvator published his book Columbretes, the world's first account of the island's flora and fauna.

The lighthouse was operated by lighthouse keepers until 1975, when it was automated. In the late 1970s, the Spanish and American navies bombarded the islands as part of military exercises. The use of the islands as targets stopped in 1982, after student protests calling for an end of the bombardments pushed the Deputation of Castellón to solicit an end to the exercises, with the Spanish Ministry of Defense complying to the request. The island is uninhabited, except for guards established by the Generalitat Valenciana.

The Columbretes islands were declared a natural park by the Council of the Generalitat Valenciana through the 15/1988 decree of 25 January, and a Marine Reserve of more than 4.400 hectares by the Ministry of Agriculture, Fisheries and Food through the Ministerial Order of 19 April 1990. They were renamed a Natural Reserve by the Generalitat Valenciana through the 11/1994 Law of 27 December.

== Fauna ==
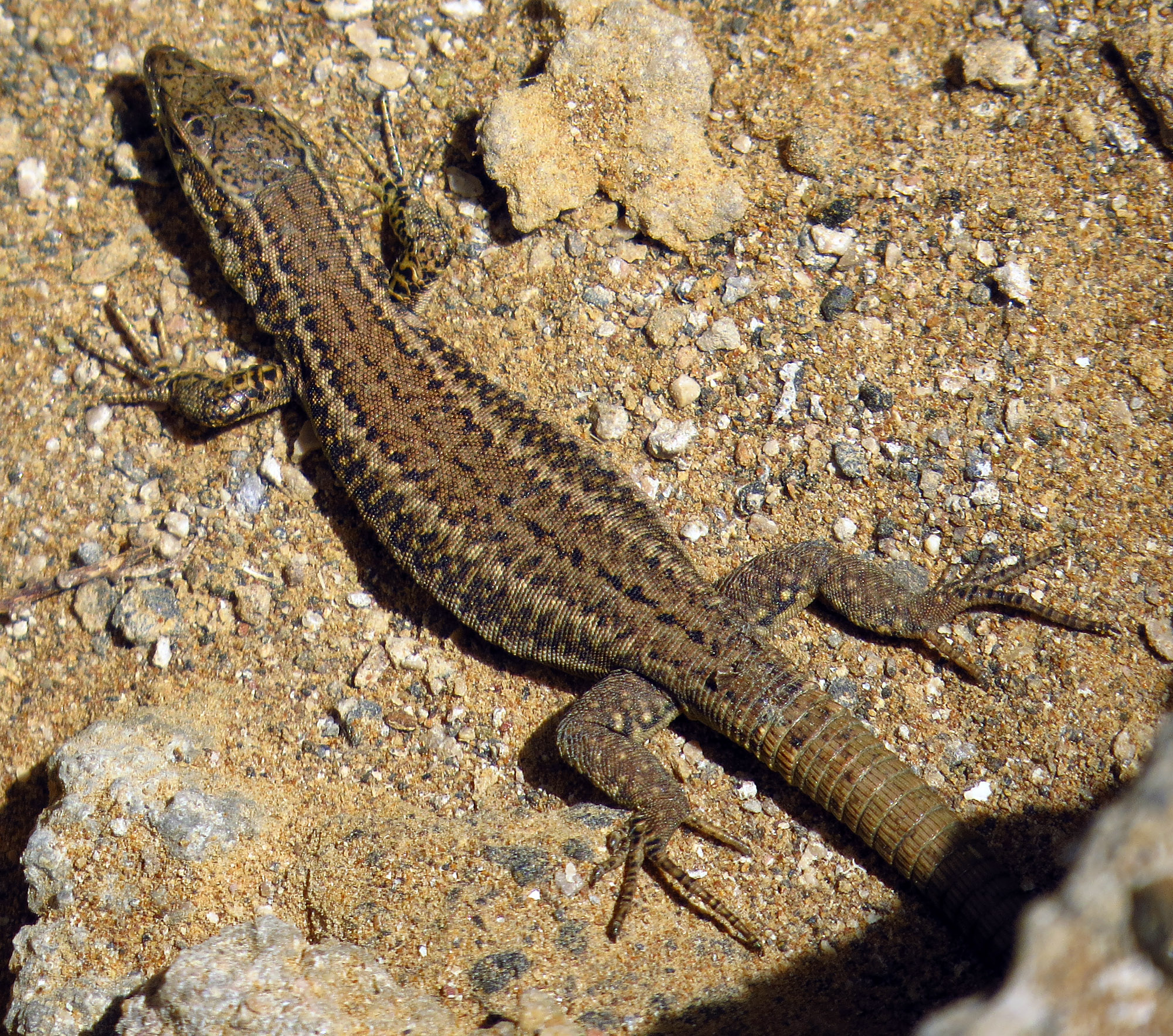
The Columbretes lizard (Podarcis atrata)

The island is known for being the natural habitat of the Columbretes lizard (Podarcis atrata). The island is also inhabited by animals in danger of extinction, such as Eleonora's falcon and Audouin's gull.
