= Sanayi (İzmir Metro) =

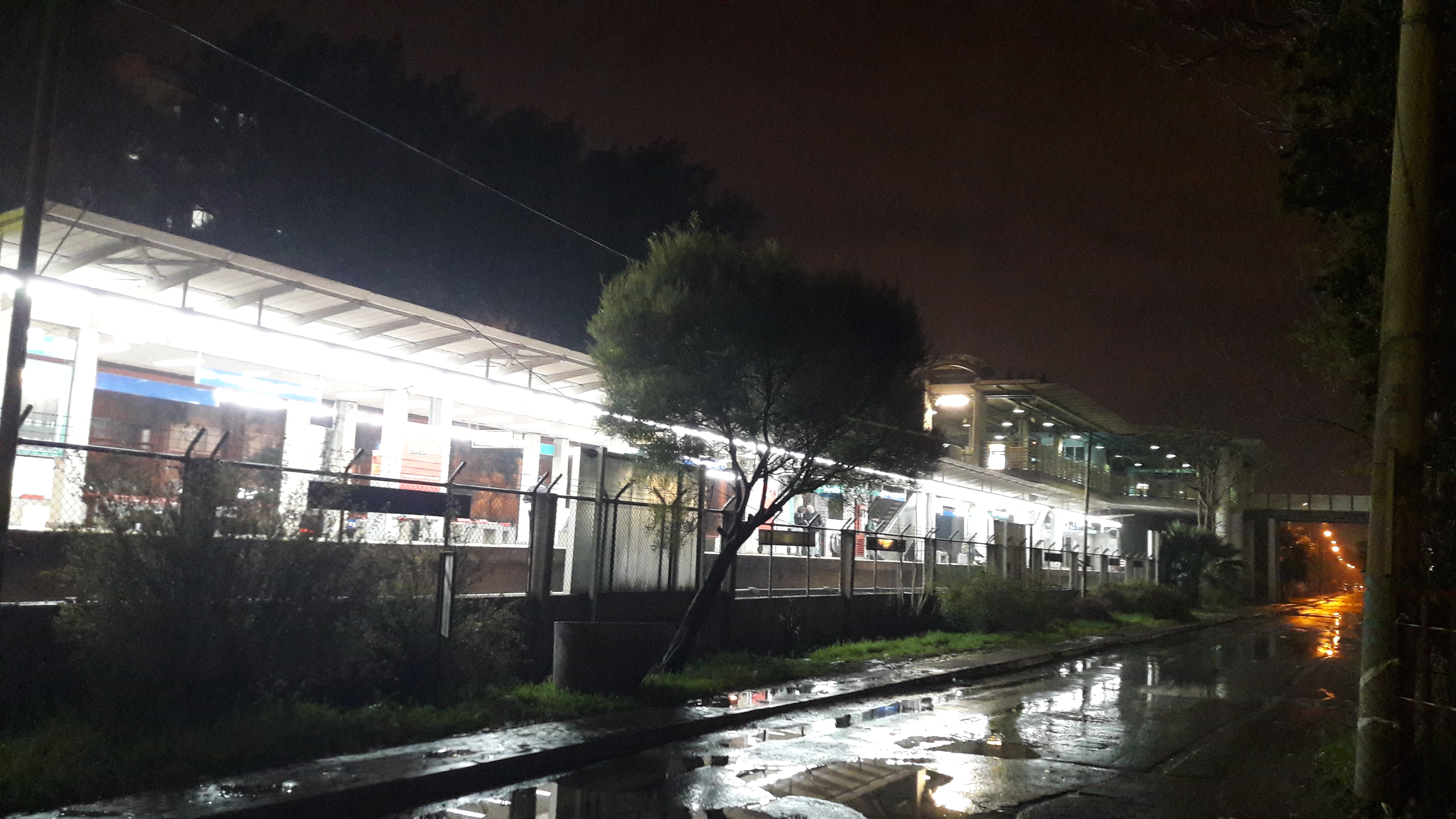
- Sanayi station at night.

General information
- Location: Üniversite Cd., Kazımdirik Mah., 35100; Bornova
- Coordinates: 38.4482°N 27.1902°E
- System: İzmir Metro rapid transit station
- Owner: İzmir Metropolitan Municipality
- Operator: İzmir Metro A.Ş.
- Line: M1
- Platforms: 1 island platform
- Tracks: 2
- Connections: ESHOT Bus: 119, 348

Construction
- Parking: No
- Cycle facilities: No
- Accessible: Yes

History
- Opened: 25 October 1866 (railway station)
- Closed: 1995-2000
- Rebuilt: 22 May 2000; 26 years ago (İzmir Metro station)

Services
Preceding station	İzmir Metro	Following station
Stadyum towards Narlıdere Kaymakamlık	M1	Bölge towards Evka 3
Former services
Preceding station	Turkish State Railways	Following station
Mersinli towards İzmir (Basmane)	Bornova suburban	Bölge towards Ege Üniversitesi
Location

Sanayi is an at-grade station on the M1 Line of the İzmir Metro in Bornova. It is located in the Kazımdirik neighborhood adjacent to Üniversite Avenue. The area around Sanayi station consists of mostly warehouses with a few apartment buildings. The station opened on 22 May 2000 as part of the ten original stations on the İzmir Metro.

== History ==
Sanayi was originally a railway station on the Bornova suburban line known as 2. Sanayi railway station (Turkish: 2. Sanayi istasyonu). The station was built by the Smyrna Cassaba Railway (SCP) and opened on 25 October 1866. Trains from Basmane station to Bornova stopped at Sanayi. Since the Bornova Branch was never extended, the station and the line remained a suburban railway. The Turkish State Railways (TCDD) took over the SCP in 1934 and continued operating commuter service on the railway. TCDD sold the railway to the İzmir Municipality in 1994 and Sanayi, along with the railway, was closed down. The Municipality began construction of the İzmir Metro in 1995 and Sanayi station was demolished. The new station was built on the existing right-of-way shortly after. Construction was completed in 1999 and the station was inaugurated on 22 May 2000, along with the metro line from Bornova to Üçyol.

== Connections ==
ESHOT operates city bus service on Üniversite Avenue.

ESHOT Bus service
Route number	Stop	Route	Location
119	Bölge Metro İstasyonu	Altındağ — Bornova Metro	Üniversite Avenue
348	Bölge Metro İstasyonu	Bornova Metro — Kemer Aktarma	Üniversite Avenue
