= Stadyum (İzmir Metro) =

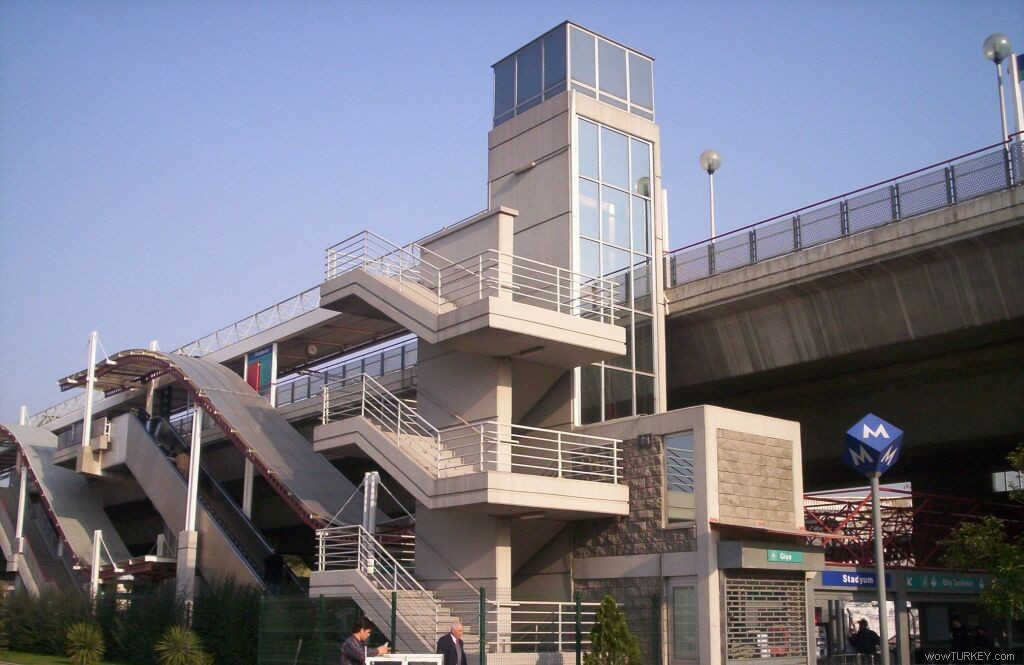

General information
- Location: 2783 Sk., Çınar Mahallesi, 35730; Bornova
- Coordinates: 38.2633°N 27.1051°E
- System: İzmir Metro rapid transit station
- Owner: İzmir Metropolitan Municipality
- Operator: İzmir Metro A.Ş.
- Line: M1
- Platforms: 2 side platforms
- Tracks: 2
- Connections: ESHOT Bus: 102, 214, 249, 415, 498, 501, 502, 503, 504, 543, 599, 662, 699, 856

Construction
- Parking: No
- Cycle facilities: No
- Accessible: Yes

History
- Opened: 25 October 1866 (railway station)
- Closed: 1995-2000
- Rebuilt: 22 May 2000; 26 years ago (İzmir Metro station)

Services
Preceding station	İzmir Metro	Following station
Halkapınar towards Narlıdere Kaymakamlık	M1	Sanayi towards Evka 3
Former services
Preceding station	Turkish State Railways	Following station
Halkapınar towards İzmir (Basmane)	Bornova suburban	2. Sanayi; towards Ege Üniversitesi
Location

Stadyum is an elevated station on the M1 Line of the İzmir Metro in Bornova. It is located in the Çınar neighborhood above Fatih Avenue and 2783rd Street. The station is named Stadyum (English: Stadium) after the nearby İzmir Atatürk Stadium, one of the largest stadiums in Turkey. Stadyum opened on 22 May 2000 as part of the ten original stations on the İzmir Metro.

== History ==
Stadyum was originally a railway station on the Bornova suburban line known as Mersinli railway station. The station was built by the Smyrna Cassaba Railway (SCP) and opened on 25 October 1866. Trains from Basmane station to Bornova stopped at Mersinli. Since the Bornova Branch was never extended, the station and the line remained a suburban railway. The Turkish State Railways (TCDD) took over the SCP in 1934 and continued operating commuter service on the railway. TCDD sold the railway to the İzmir Municipality in 1994 and Mersinli, along with the railway, was closed down. The Municipality began construction of the İzmir Metro in 1995 and Mersinli station was demolished. The new station, named Stadyum, was built as an elevated station on the new right-of-way. Construction was completed in 1999 and the station was inaugurated on 22 May 2000, along with the metro line from Bornova to Üçyol.

== Connections ==
ESHOT operates city bus service on İnönü Avenue.

ESHOT Bus service
Route number	Stop	Route	Location
102	Stadyum İstasyon	Alpaslan Mahallesi — Halkapınar Metro	Fatih Avenue
214	Stadyum İstasyon	Evka 3 Metro — Kemer	Fatih Avenue
249	Stadyum İstasyon	Evka 4 — Kemer	Fatih Avenue
415	Stadyum İstasyon	Tınaztepe — Bornova Metro	Fatih Avenue
498	Stadyum İstasyon	Bornova Metro — Halkapınar Metro	Fatih Avenue
501	Stadyum İstasyon	Çiçek Mahallesi — Halkapınar Metro	Fatih Avenue
502	Stadyum İstasyon	Cengizhan — Halkapınar Metro	Fatih Avenue
503	Stadyum İstasyon	Gazi Meydanı — Halkapınar Metro	Fatih Avenue
504	Stadyum İstasyon	Fuat Edip Baksı — Halkapınar Metro	Fatih Avenue
543	Stadyum İstasyon	Bostanlı İskele — Halkapınar Metro	Fatih Avenue
599	Stadyum İstasyon	M. Erener — Halkapınar Metro	Fatih Avenue
662	Stadyum İstasyon	Cengizhan — Kemer	Fatih Avenue
699	Stadyum İstasyon	M. Erener — Kemer	Fatih Avenue
856	Stadyum İstasyon	Bornova Metro — Halkapınar Metro	Fatih Avenue
