= Bornova (İzmir Metro) =

Station in the Izmir Metro

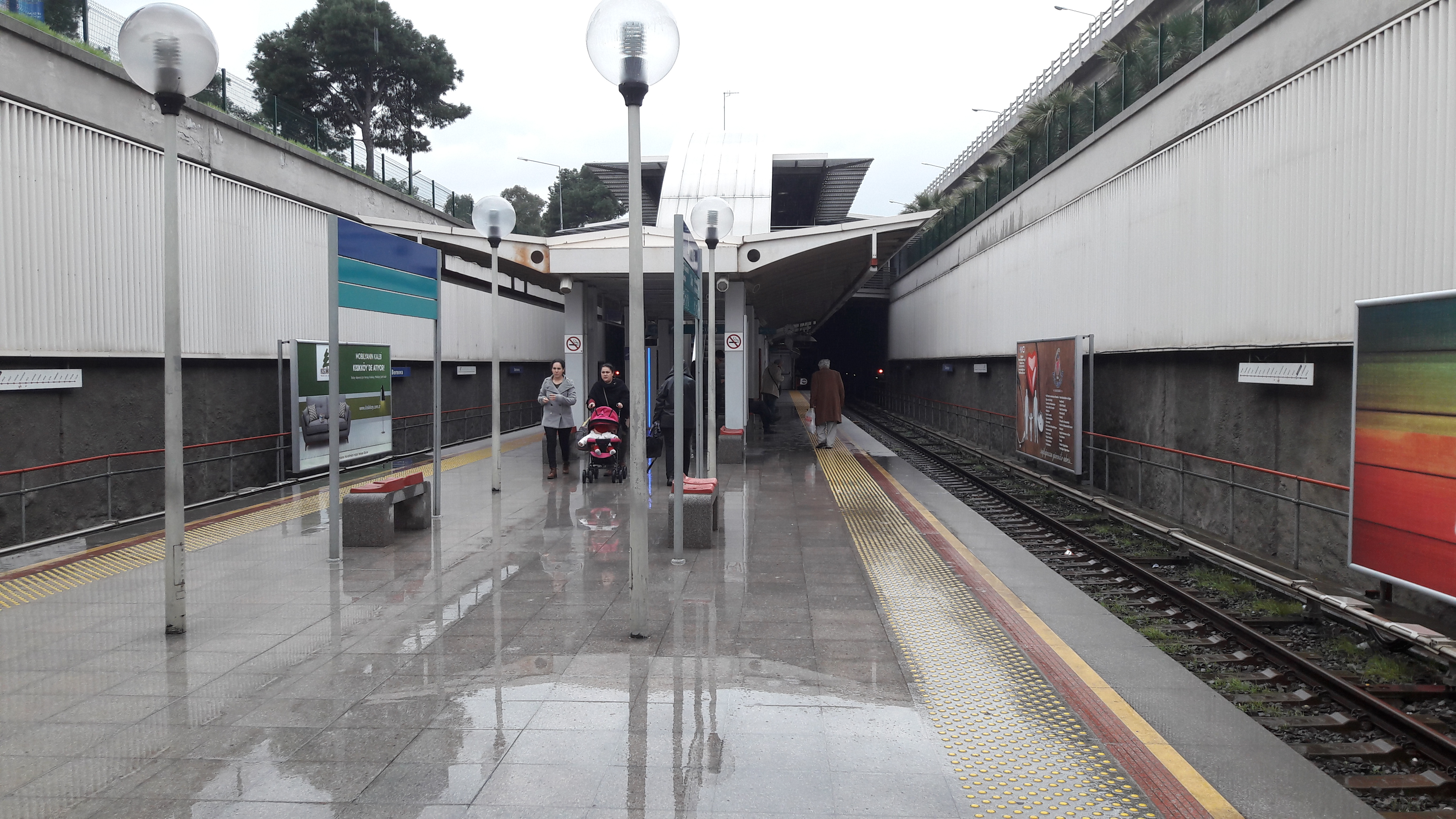

General information
- Location: Ankara Cd., Kazımdirik Mah., 35100; Bornova
- Coordinates: 38.4584°N 27.2127°E
- System: İzmir Metro rapid transit station
- Owner: İzmir Metropolitan Municipality
- Operator: İzmir Metro A.Ş.
- Line: M1
- Platforms: 1 island platform
- Tracks: 2
- Connections: ESHOT Bus: 59, 119, 204, 267, 268, 314, 505

Construction
- Structure type: Partial cut and cover leading to deep tunnel
- Parking: No
- Cycle facilities: No
- Accessible: Yes

Other information
- Station code: BOR
- Fare zone: A

History
- Opened: 25 October 1866 (railway station)
- Closed: 1995-2000
- Rebuilt: 22 May 2000; 26 years ago (İzmir Metro station)

Services
Preceding station	İzmir Metro	Following station
Bölge towards Narlıdere Kaymakamlık	M1	Ege Üniversitesi towards Evka 3
Former services
Preceding station	Turkish State Railways	Following station
E.Ü. Hastane towards İzmir (Basmane)	Bornova suburban	Ege Üniversitesi Terminus
Location

Bornova is a station on the currently operating line of the İzmir Metro. It is located near the former Bornova railway station between Ankara and University Avenues. Transfer to city buses are available at an ESHOT bus hub located right next to the station. Even though the station name is Bornova it lies 1.05 km (0.65 mi) southwest of Bornova's center. Plans to extend the line from Evka 3 to Bornova Center have been made but is unclear when construction will start.

Bornova opened on 22 May 2000, four years after the closure of TCDD's Bornova Branch. Between 2000 and 2012, Bornova was the eastern terminus of the line until it was extended two stations further east to Evka 3.

== Bus connections ==
- 59 Bornova Metro - Kemer Aktarma Merkezi
- 119 Altındağ - Bornova Metro
- 204 Bornova Metro - Havalimanı
- 267 Pınarbaşı - Bornova Metro
- 268 Doğanlar - Bornova Metro
- 314 Evka 3 - Bornova Metro
- 505 Çamkule - Bornova Metro
