= M1 (İzmir Metro) =

İzmir Metro line

M1 Narlıdere Kaymakamlık–Evka 3 Line

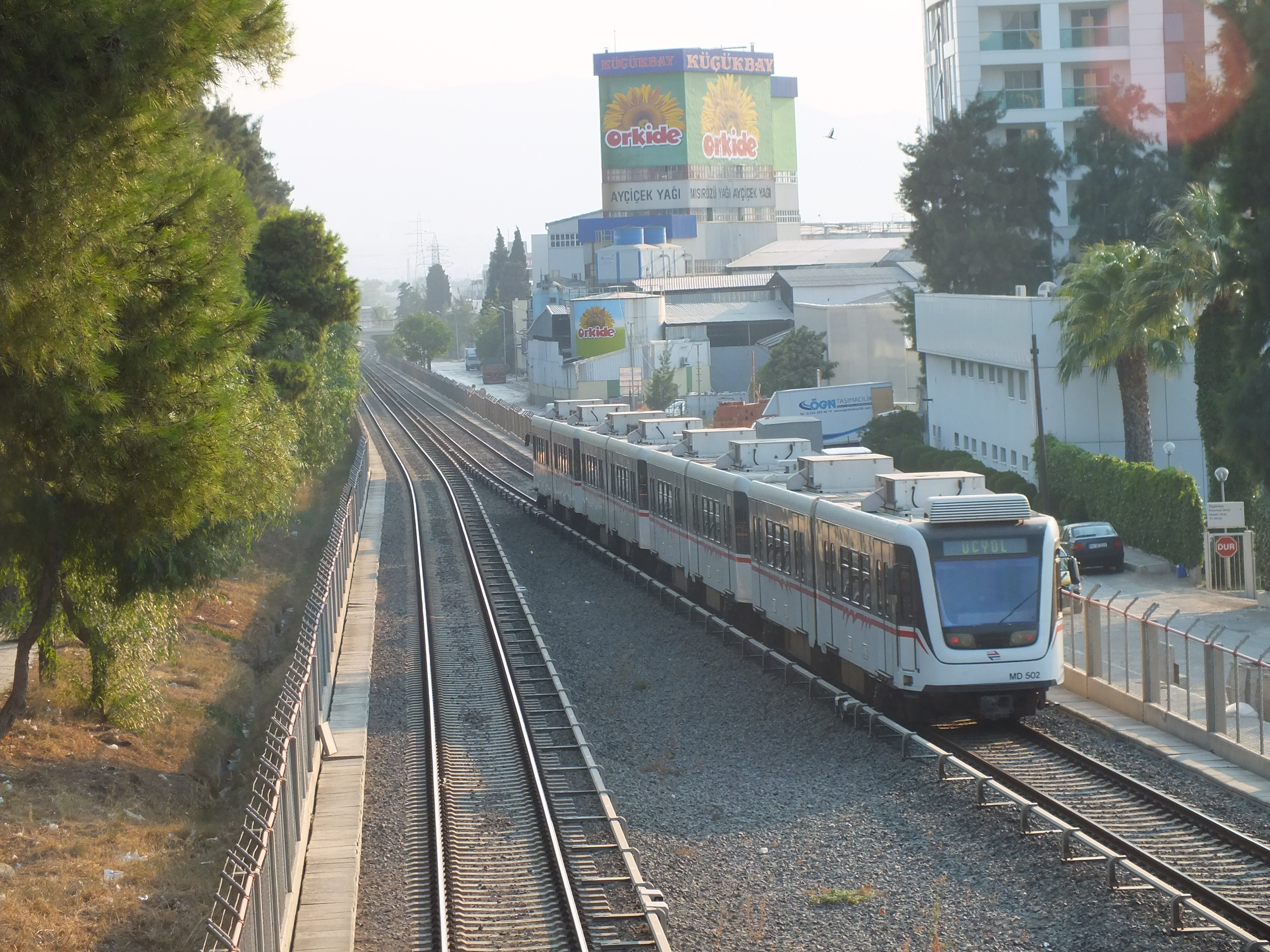
- A westbound train after departing Bölge station.

Overview
- Native name: Narlıdere Kaymakamlık–Evka 3 Hattı
- Status: In operation
- Owner: İzmir Metropolitan Municipality
- Locale: İzmir, Turkey
- Termini: Narlıdere Kaymakamlık, Narlıdere (West); Evka 3, Bornova (East)
- Stations: 24

Service
- Type: Light metro
- System: İzmir Metro
- Operator: İzmir Metro A.Ş.
- Depot: Halkapınar depot
- Rolling stock: 182: 45 ABB wagons (2-car 5-unit); 42 CSR wagons (2-car 5-unit); 95 CNR wagons; CRRC (5 articulated car unit)
- Ridership: 100 million (2019)

History
- Work began: September 1992
- Opened: 22 May 2000; 26 years ago
- Completed: April 2000

Technical
- Line length: 27 km (17 mi)
- Number of tracks: Double track, drives on the right (with the exception of Halkapınar station, which is triple track)
- Track gauge: 1,435 mm (4 ft 8 1/2 in) standard gauge
- Minimum radius: 125 metres (410 ft)
- Electrification: 750V DC third rail, bottom contact
- Operating speed: 80 km/h (50 mph)

The M1, also known as the Narlıdere Kaymakamlık–Evka 3 Line (Turkish: Narlıdere Kaymakamlık–Evka 3 Hattı), is the only active line of the İzmir Metro in İzmir, Turkey. The 27 kilometres (17 mi) line runs from Narlıdere Kaymakamlık station in the west to Evka 3 station in the east, consisting of 24 stations. Construction of the first stage of line began in 1992 and was completed in 2000, consisting of 10 initial stations.

Further extensions of the line since 2005 have been plagued by repeated construction delays and re-awarding of tenders. An eastern extension in 2012 and two western extensions in 2014 and 2024 added another two, five and seven stations to the line respectively. Plans exist for a further extension to Güzelbahçe in future.

All stations on the M1 are handicapped accessible. The line runs almost completely underground with the exception of six stations.

== Construction ==
=== Bornova to Üçyol section (1992–2000) ===
The construction of the M1 started in September 1992 with its foundation being laid in December 1994. The 1.7 km (1.1 mi) Nenehatun tunnels (named after Nene Hatun) between Üçyol and Konak stations were constructed via the New Austrian tunnelling method (NATM), while the 2.8 km (1.7 mi) Ümmühan Ana tunnels (named after the mother of Süleyman Demirel) between Konak and Basmane stations were constructed via the earth pressure balance tunnelling method. The rolling stock was delivered in August 1996. The first 12 km (7.5 mi) section from Bornova to Üçyol stations was completed in April 2000. Consisting of 10 stations, it began service on 22 May 2000.

=== Üçyol to Fahrettin Altay section (2005–2014) ===
In March 2005, a tender was awarded for the Üçyol–Fahrettin Altay section, a 5.2 km (3.2 mi) extension to the west consisting of six new stations. The foundation of the extension was laid three months later and tunneling works commenced on 5 July 2005, with the extension slated to be completed in two years. However, when the contractor failed to fulfill their obligations, the İzmir Metropolitan Municipality sent a cease and desist letter to the company on 14 February 2006, subsequently cancelling the tender in November 2006. A new tender was announced on 23 January 2007 with an aim complete the extension by 31 October 2008. The tender was cancelled on 13 August 2009 after the contractor requested a 15-month extension.

The İzmir Metropolitan Municipality issued a third tender in October 2009, but it was again cancelled by the Public Procurement Authority for unspecified reasons. The cancellation had occurred after a company's objection to the tender even though it had not been invited to the tender. Consequently, İzmir Metropolitan decided to complete the remaining construction using their own resources due to the possibility of a tunnel collapse if it were not concreted. The contractor then resumed work in February 2010 after the cancellation was turned down by the administrative court.

On 18 June 2012, test runs began between İzmirspor and Hatay stations, opening to passengers service on 29 December 2012. Göztepe station entered service on 25 March 2014, with the last two stations on the extension, Poligon and Fahrettin Altay stations, opening their doors on 27 July 2014. The planned Güzelyalı station between these two stations was dropped from the project due to an underground stream.

=== Bornova to Bornova Merkez section (2007–present) ===
Work on the Bornova–Bornova Merkez extension on the M1's eastern axis started in 2007. However, the section between Evka 3 and Bornova Merkez stations was delayed after the contractor company refused to do construction drawings. Constructing the section would have risked building damage as it was discovered during excavations that the soil contained clay and sand. The construction was fully stopped in 2008 after the contractor could not finish the extension and requested an additional year, which was rejected. A new tender was issued in October 2009 to finish the remaining work. However, that tender was cancelled by the Public Procurement Authority.

A third tender was made in April 2010, but it was cancelled by the municipality after the court reverted the cancellation of the second tender. The municipality signed an agreement with the winner of the second tender but the agreement was reverted after the high court reversed the decision of lower court about the second tender. A fourth tender was issued in August 2010 and construction started in September. Test drives started on 20 March 2012 for the 2.6 km (1.6 mi) section to Evka 3. Evka 3 and Ege University stations began service on 30 March 2012.

=== Fahrettin Altay to Narlıdere Kaymakamlık section (2018–2024) ===
Works on the 7.2 km (4.5 mi) Fahrettin Altay–Narlıdere Kaymakamlık extension to the west began on 9 June 2018 at a cost of €287 million. There are seven stations built for the extension: Balçova, Çağdaş, Dokuz Eylül Üniversitesi Hastanesi, Güzel Sanatlar, Narlıdere İtfaiye, 100. Yıl Cumhuriyet Şehitlik, and Narlıdere Kaymakamlık. Two other stations that were originally planned to be built in the west direction, were removed from the project, as it was predicted that the number of passengers would be insufficient. The first six stations on the extension were completed on 24 February 2024, with the last station, Kaymakamlık, opening its doors on 4 March 2024.

=== Further extensions and plans ===
The line is planned to be extended to Bornova district in the east and Güzelbahçe in the west, with further extensions still under planning.

The M1 line will be further extended from Kaymakamlık to Güzelbahçe. This 13.6 km (8.5 mi) extension is planned to have another 11 stations.

== Stations ==
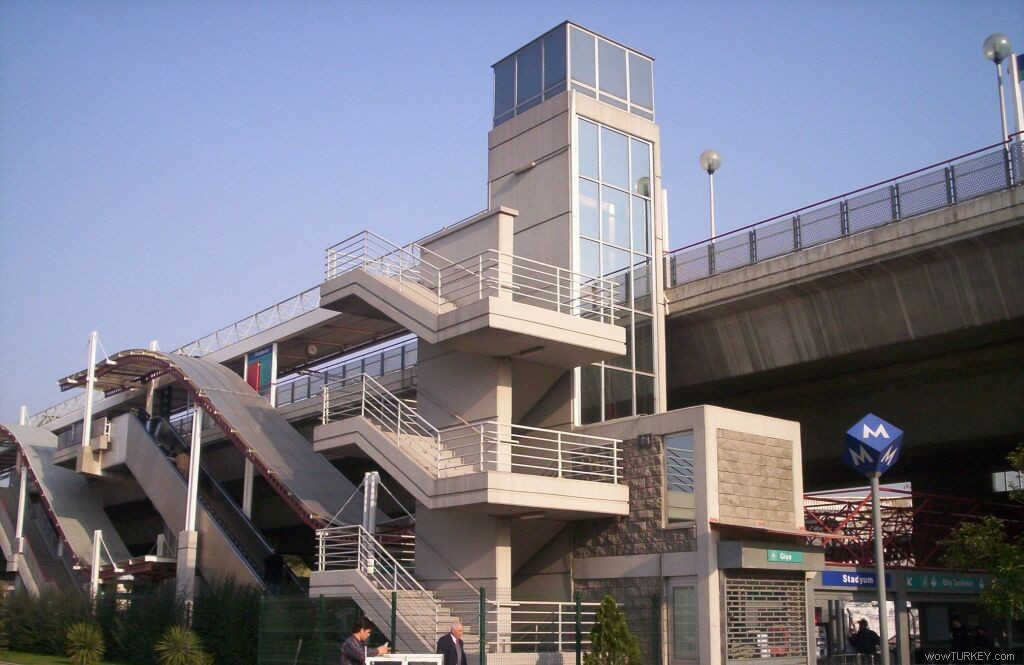
The exterior of Stadyum metro station

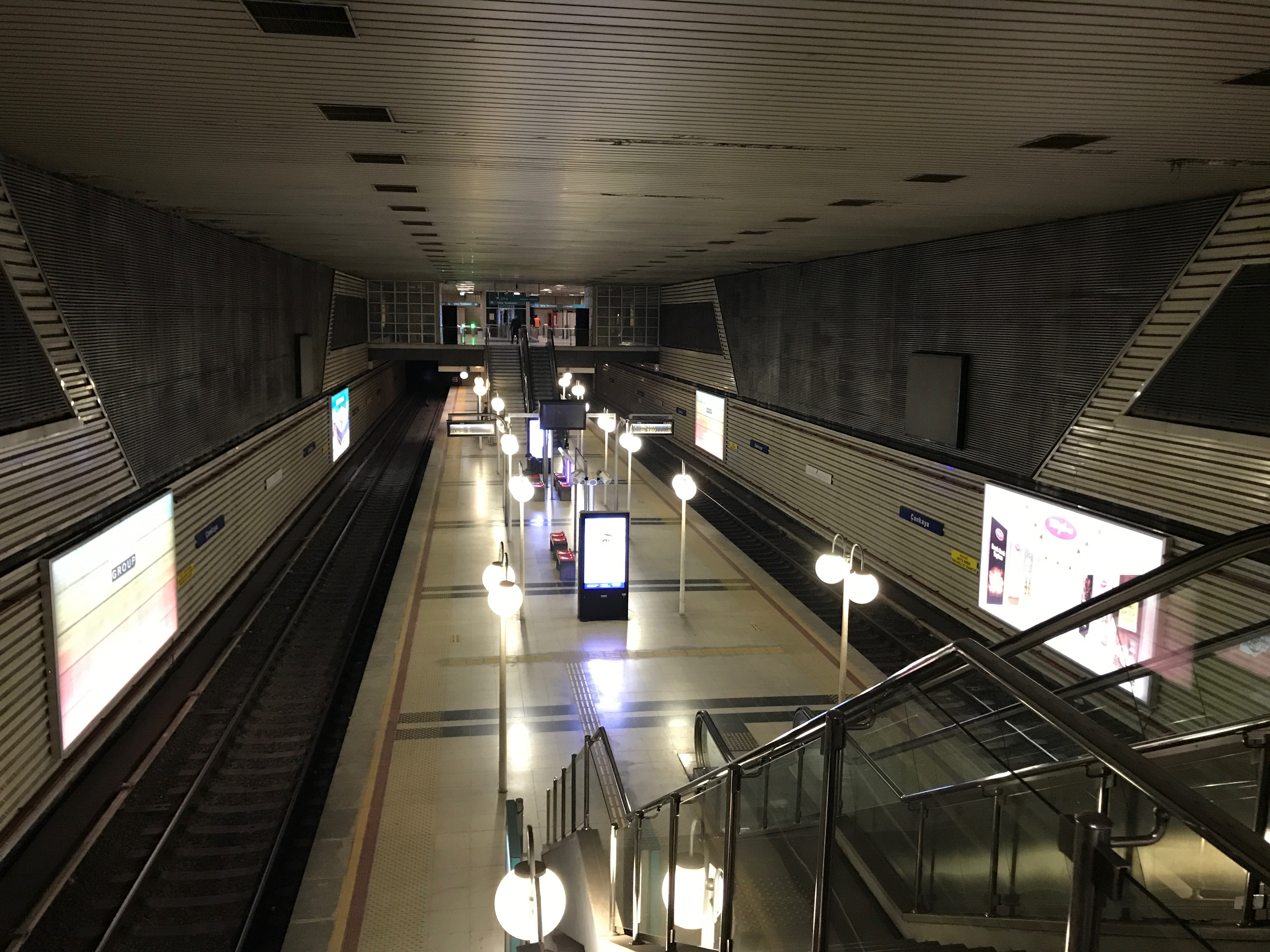
The interior of Çankaya metro station

There are 24 stations on the M1 line, all with handicapped access. Most of the stations are underground with the following exceptions: Bölge, Halkapınar and Sanayi stations are at-grade; Hilal and Stadyum stations are on viaducts; and Bornova station is in a splitting tunnel. Each station has a platform length of 125 m (410 ft).

As of September 2020, all stations charge a standard fare (₺13) from standard İzmirim Kart owners for the first ride.

Links to the transportation network include: transfer to İZBAN at both Halkapınar and Hilal stations; to ESHOT and İZULAŞ buses via Bornova, Evka 3, Fahrettin Altay, Halkapınar, Konak and Üçyol stations; to İZDENİZ ships via Konak station; TCDD Taşımacılık trains via Basmane station; and to Konak Tram via Fahrettin Altay, Halkapınar and Konak.

No	Station	District	Transfer	Type	Notes
1	Zeytinalanı	Urla		Underground	
2	Çamlıçay	Urla		Underground	
3	Siteler	Güzelbahçe		Underground	
4	Seferihisar Kavşağı	Güzelbahçe		Underground	
5	Yalı	Güzelbahçe		Underground	
6	Güzelbahçe İskele	Güzelbahçe	・ (Güzelbahçe Pier)	Underground	
7	Anıt	Güzelbahçe		Underground	
8	Maltepe	Güzelbahçe		Underground	
9	Limanreis	Narlıdere		Underground	
10	Lojmanlar	Narlıdere		Underground	
11	Pertev Bey	Narlıdere		Underground	
↑↑ Project ↑↑
12	Narlıdere Kaymakamlık	Narlıdere		Underground	Narlıdere District Governor's Office, Narlıdere Nursing Home
13	100. Yıl Cumhuriyet Şehitlik	Narlıdere		Underground	Narlıdere Martyrdom, Martyrdom Mosque, Narlıdere AKM, Narlıdere Municipality, Narlıdere Bus Interchange (Planned)
14	Narlıdere İtfaiye	Narlıdere		Underground	Narlıdere Fire Station
15	Güzel Sanatlar	Narlıdere		Underground	Dokuz Eylul University R&D Zone
16	Dokuz Eylül Üniversitesi Hastanesi	Balçova		Underground	Dokuz Eylul University Faculty of Medicine
17	Çağdaş	Balçova		Underground	Balçova Kipa AVM, Ege Park AVM, Ramada Encore İzmir, Asmaçatı AVM It is about 800 meters walking distance to Balçova Cable Car and 500 meters to İzmir University of Economics.
18	Balçova	Balçova		Underground	Agora AVM, Ata Street, Media Markt, Flo and Ekol Medical Center are within walking distance.
19	Fahrettin Altay	Konak, Karabağlar & Balçova	T2 (Fahrettin Altay)・・	Underground	İstinyePark İzmir・Ahmed Adnan Saygun Art Center・Gürsel Aksel Stadium・İzmir Democracy University
20	Poligon	Konak & Karabağlar	・	Underground	Güzelyalı
21	Göztepe	Konak & Karabağlar	・	Underground	Dokuz Eylul University Faculty of Theology
22	Hatay	Konak & Karabağlar	・	Underground	
23	İzmirspor	Konak & Karabağlar	・	Underground	İzmir Katip Celebi University Atatürk Training and Research Hospital Hatay Additional Service Building
24	Üçyol	Konak & Karabağlar	M2 (Üçyol)・・	Underground	İzmirspor Facilities
25	Konak	Konak	T2 (Konak İskele)・・・ (Konak)	Underground	Konak Square, İzmir Clock Tower, Konak Mosque, Izmir Government Mansion (Izmir Governor's Office), Kemeraltı
26	Çankaya	Konak	T2 (Gazi Bulvarı)・・	Underground	Kemeraltı, Hisar Mosque, Kizlaragasi Inn, Yeni Kavaflar Bazaar, Izmir Agora
27	Basmane	Konak	(Basmane Gar, planned)・ (Basmane Railway Station)・ M3 (Basmane)・・	Underground	Basmane Train Station, Kültürpark
28	Hilal	Konak	(Hilal)	Viaduct	
29	Halkapınar	Konak	・ (planned) T2・ (Halkapınar)・ M3 M5 (Halkapınar)	Level	Halkapınar Maintenance Facility --- İzmir Atatürk Stadium, 1st Industrial Zone, Site of Food Merchants, Halkapınar Sport Hall
30	Stadyum	Bornova	・	Viaduct	3rd Industrial Zone, Regional Courts of Appeals
31	Sanayi	Bornova	・	Level	2nd Industrial Zone
32	Bölge	Bornova	・	Level	Yaşar University
33	Bornova	Bornova	・	Below-grade	Ege University, Ege University Medical Faculty Hospital, Küçükpark
34	Ege Üniversitesi	Bornova		Underground	Ege University, Bilal Saygılı Mosque
35	Evka 3	Bornova	・	Underground	Ali Rıza Güven Mosque
↓↓ Construction suspended ↓↓
36	Bornova Merkez	Bornova	M4 (Bornova Merkez)・・	Underground	Bornova Republic Square, Bornova Government House

== Trains ==
The M1 opened in 2000 with 45 wagons built by Adtranz (later Bombardier Transportation). In 2011, the wagon number was increased to 77 with 8 train sets built by the Chinese CSR Zhuzhou (now CRRC Zhuzhou) consisting of 32 wagons. 10 more wagons were added in 2015, increasing the number to 87. 19 train sets consisting of 95 wagons built by CRRC Tangshan were delivered in 2017, increasing the total to 182. Each train set consisted of three wagons at first; however, this number increased to four, then five. The trains work at an average of 40 km/h (25 mph) and are stored in Halkapınar Maintenance Facility.

== Accidents ==
In 2015, the escalators at Üçyol station broke down, resulting with 14 injuries.

In 2016, a train collided with a container that fell onto the rails near Bölge station, injuring 10 people. The train tilted over as a result of the collision.

In 2019, a construction worker died after his arm was crushed during the construction in Narlıdere.

In 2023, a train parted and a few cars of it derailed as a result of a switch throwing while the vehicle was passing over it.
