= Göztepe (İzmir Metro) =

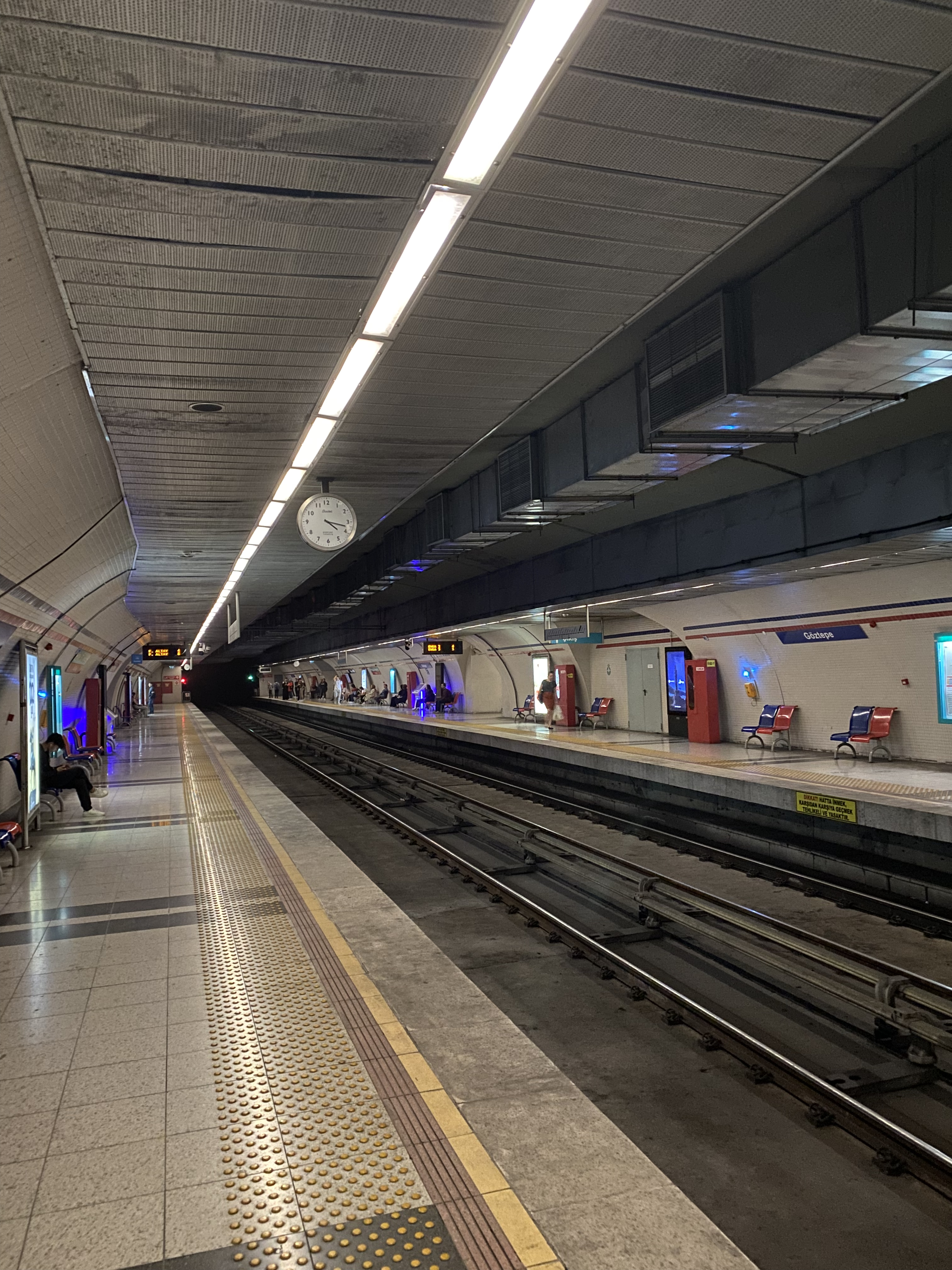
- A Fahrettin Altay-bound train at the station.

General information
- Location: İnönü Cd. 436, Göztepe Mah., 35290; Konak
- Coordinates: 38.3960°N 27.0945°E
- System: İzmir Metro rapid transit station
- Owner: İzmir Metropolitan Municipality
- Operator: İzmir Metro A.Ş.
- Line: M1
- Platforms: 2 side platforms
- Tracks: 2
- Connections: ESHOT Bus: 581, 950

Construction
- Parking: No
- Cycle facilities: No
- Accessible: Yes

History
- Opened: 25 March 2014; 12 years ago

Services
Preceding station	İzmir Metro	Following station
Poligon towards Narlıdere Kaymakamlık	M1	Hatay towards Evka 3
Location

Göztepe is an underground station on the M1 Line of the İzmir Metro in Göztepe, Konak. Located under İnönü Avenue, it consists of two side platforms servicing two tracks. Connection to ESHOT bus service is available at street level.

Göztepe was opened on 25 March 2014 as part of a single station westward extension of the line from Hatay and was the western terminus of the line from 25 March 2014 to 27 July 2014. The extension to Fahrettin Altay opened on 27 July 2014.

== Connections ==
ESHOT operates city bus service on İnönü Avenue.

ESHOT Bus service
Route number	Stop	Route	Location
581	Amerikan Koleji	F. Altay Aktarma — Halkapınar Metro	İnönü Avenue
950	Amerikan Koleji	Narlıdere — Konak	İnönü Avenue

== Nearby Places of Interest ==
- American Collegiate Institute
