= İzmirspor (İzmir Metro) =

Metro station in Turkey

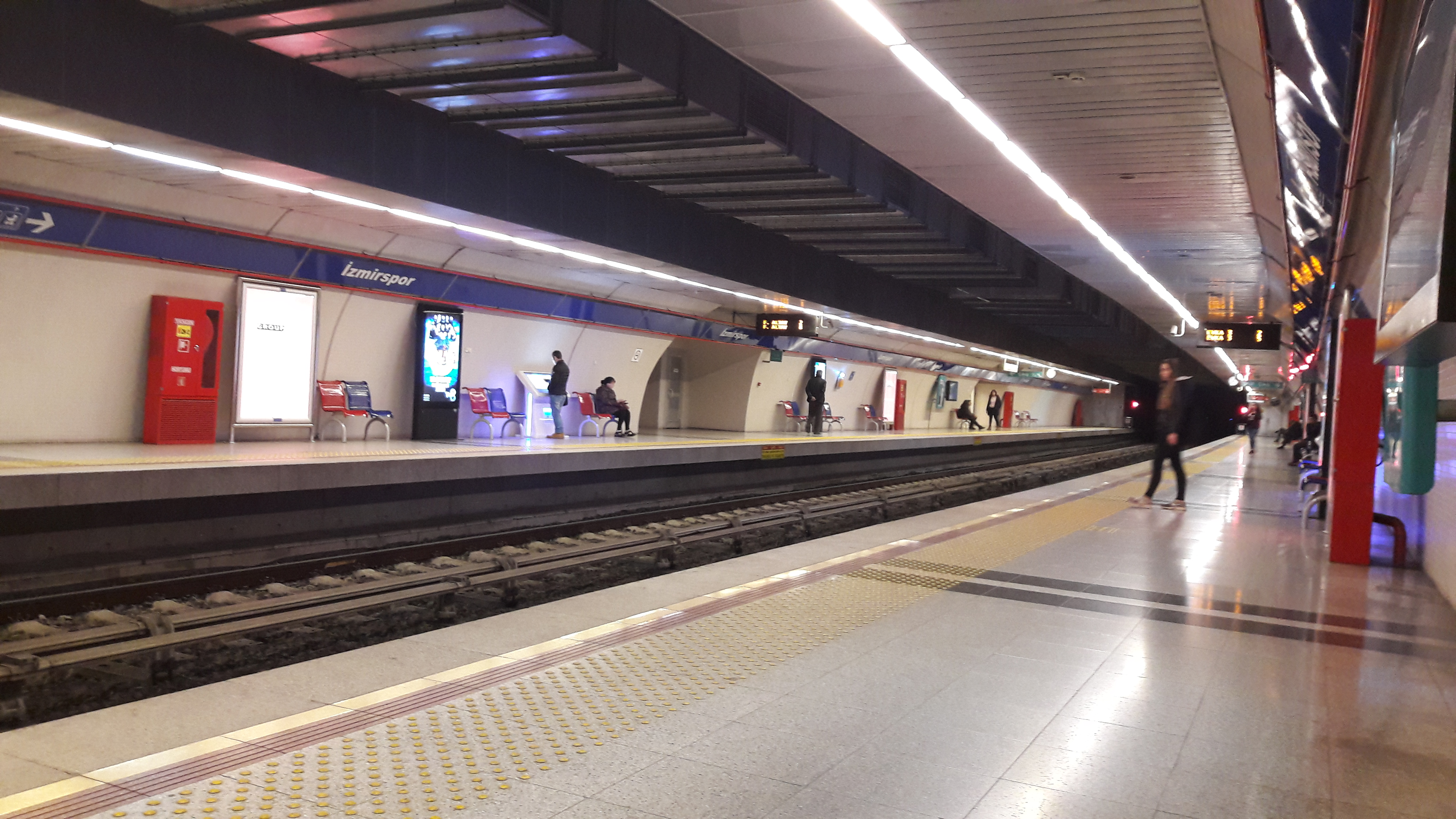

General information
- Location: İnönü Cd., Arap Hasan Mah., 35150; Konak
- Coordinates: 38.2501°N 27.0741°E
- System: İzmir Metro rapid transit station
- Owner: İzmir Metropolitan Municipality
- Operator: İzmir Metro A.Ş.
- Line: M1
- Platforms: 2 side platforms
- Tracks: 2
- Connections: ESHOT Bus: 15, 581, 950

Construction
- Parking: No
- Cycle facilities: No
- Accessible: Yes

History
- Opened: 29 December 2012; 13 years ago

Services
Preceding station	İzmir Metro	Following station
Hatay towards Narlıdere Kaymakamlık	M1	Üçyol towards Evka 3
Location

İzmirspor is an underground station on the M1 Line of the İzmir Metro in Hatay, Konak. Located under İnönü Avenue, it consists of two side platforms servicing two tracks. Connection to ESHOT bus service is available at street level.

İzmirspor opened on 29 December 2012, along with Hatay station, as part of a two station westward extension of the line. The opening marked the partial completion of the extension to Fahrettin Altay, which was opened fully on 27 July 2014.

== Connections ==
ESHOT operates city bus service on İnönü Avenue.

ESHOT Bus service
Route number	Stop	Route	Location
15	Çeşme	İnönü — Konak	İnönü Avenue
581	Çeşme	F. Altay Aktarma — Halkapınar Metro	İnönü Avenue
950	Çeşme	Narlıdere — Konak	İnönü Avenue
