= Hilal (İzmir Metro) =

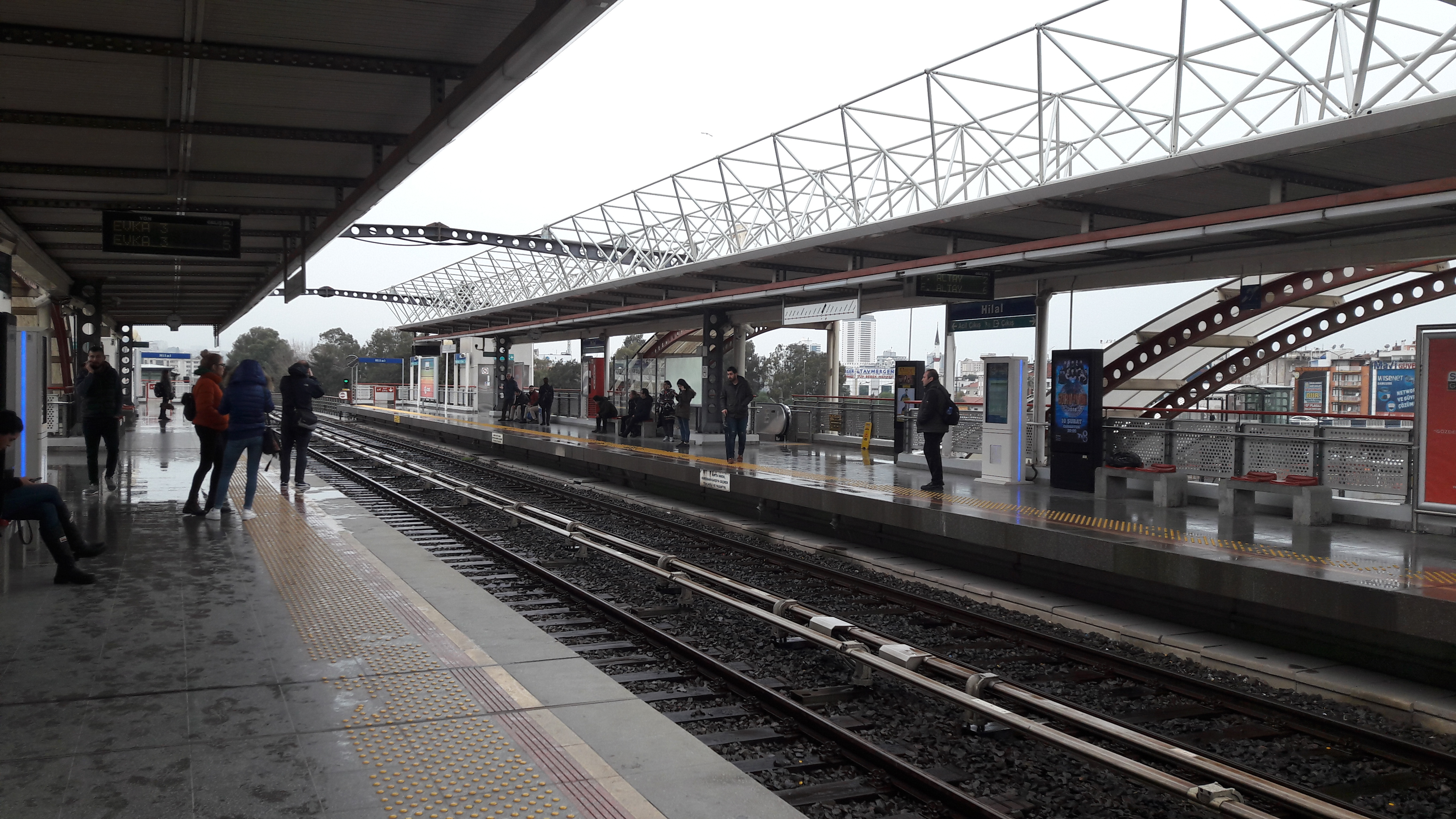

General information
- Location: Ege Mah., 35230; Konak
- Coordinates: 38.4268°N 27.1549°E
- System: İzmir Metro rapid transit station
- Owner: İzmir Metropolitan Municipality
- Operator: İzmir Metro A.Ş.
- Line: M1
- Platforms: 1 island platform
- Tracks: 2
- Connections: İZBAN at Hilal

Construction
- Parking: No
- Cycle facilities: No
- Accessible: Yes

History
- Opened: 22 May 2000; 26 years ago

Services
Preceding station	İzmir Metro	Following station
Basmane towards Narlıdere Kaymakamlık	M1	Halkapınar towards Evka 3
Location

Hilal is an elevated station on the M1 Line of the İzmir Metro in Konak. Located above the Turkish State Railways' Hilal junction, it is one of the ten original stations of the metro system. Connection to İZBAN commuter trains are available at Hilal railway station. Since Hilal is located in the middle of a railway junction, no direct connections to ESHOT city bus service is available. The closest bus stop is located on 1396th Street about 460 m (1,510 ft) northwest of the station.

Hilal station was opened on 22 May 2000.

== Layout ==
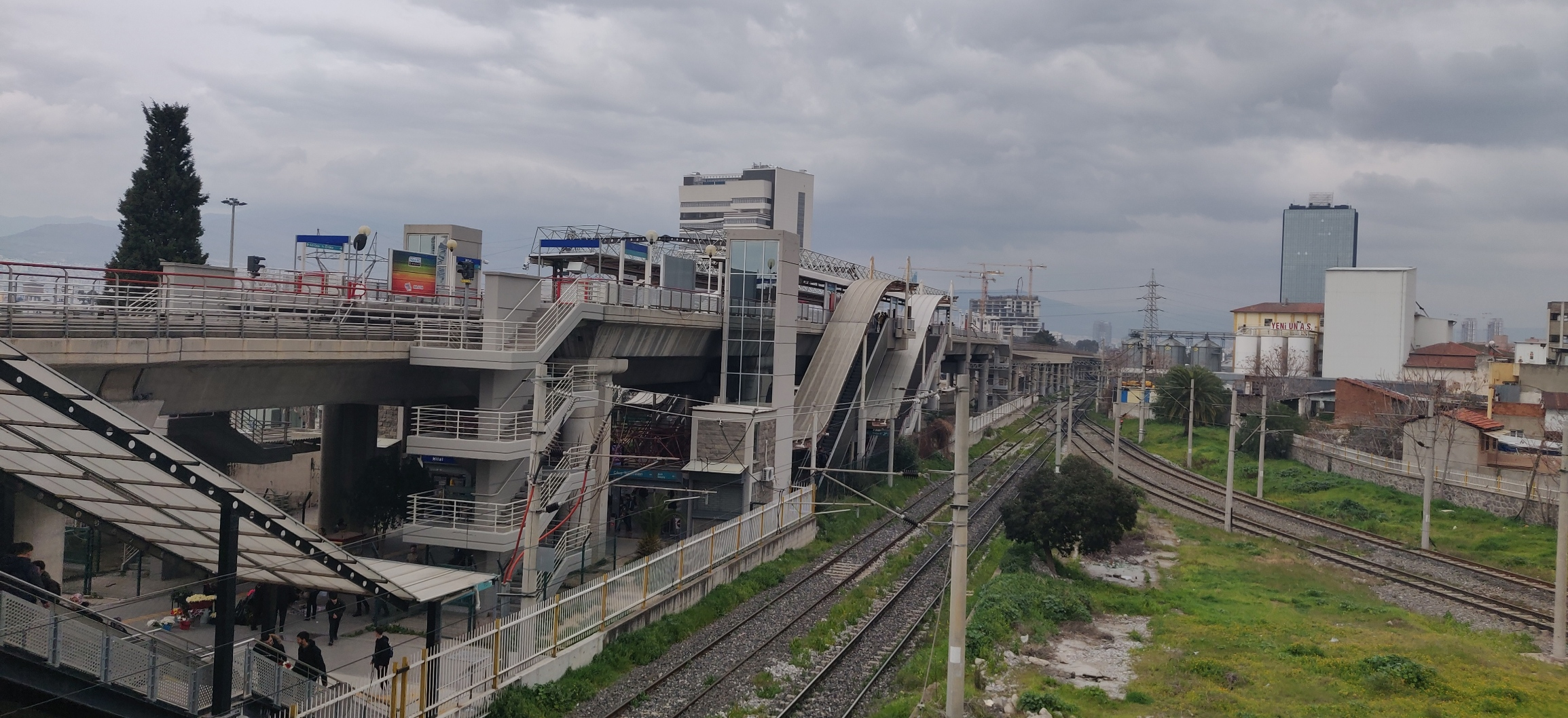
The station structure seen from a nearby overpass.

Hilal is one of two elevated stations on the İzmir Metro, along with Stadyum, and consists of two side platforms with two tracks. Directly beneath the station, on ground level, is the mezzanine with fare control and ticket machines. Since the station itself is located within the Hilal junction, the surrounding streets are accessible via walkways and bridges over the railway tracks in the junction. Connection to the northbound İZBAN platform are located at the west end of the mezzanine; while a walkway north to Akıncılar Avenue continues past the northbound platform. Connection to the southbound İZBAN platform are available via an elevated walkway over the İZBAN tracks. From this walkway, another elevated walkway diverges off to the Hilal neighborhood.
