= Konak (İzmir Metro) =

Underground station on the M1 Line of the İzmir Metro in Konak, Turkey

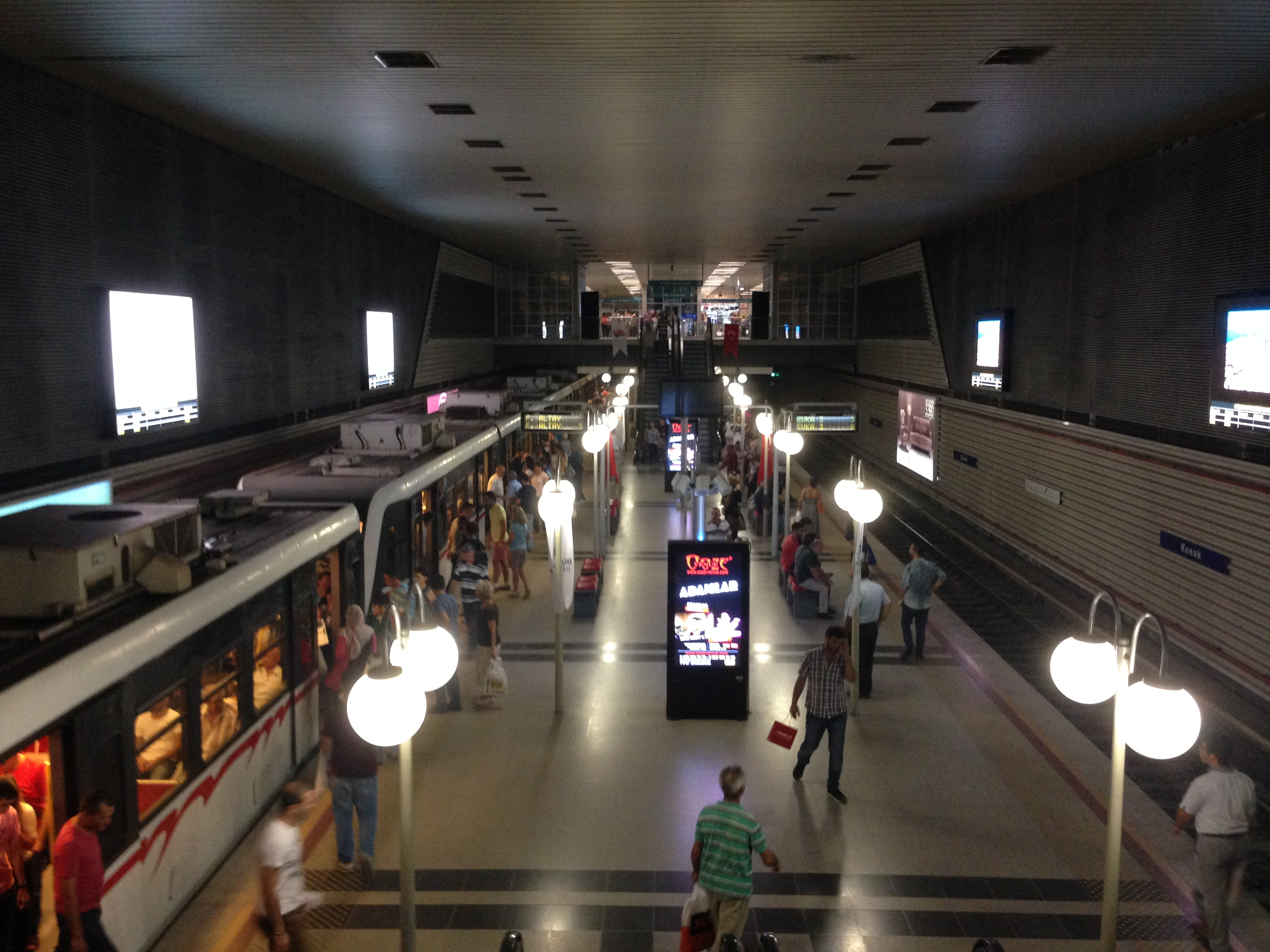
- The main hall of the station, with a high ceiling.

General information
- Location: Cumhuriyet Blv., Konak Mah., 35140; Konak
- Coordinates: 38.2501°N 27.0741°E
- System: İzmir Metro rapid transit station
- Owner: İzmir Metropolitan Municipality
- Operator: İzmir Metro A.Ş.
- Line: M1
- Platforms: 1 island platform
- Tracks: 2
- Connections: Tram İzmir at Konak İskele; İzdeniz at Konak Terminal; ESHOT Bus: Konak: 10, 72, 104, 105, 152, 171, 233, 285, 303, 304, 374, 465, 466, 471, 484, 485, 508, 887; Bahribaba: 15, 21, 27, 29, 30, 32, 33, 35, 121, 157, 193, 224, 253, 302, 550, 587, 588, 811, 910, 920, 930, 940, 950, 951; İskele: 35, 121, 202, 253, 302, 466, 910, 920, 930, 940, 950, 951; Belediye Sarayı: 18, 19, 20, 121, 202, 253, 302, 466, 811, 910, 920, 930, 940, 950

Construction
- Parking: No
- Cycle facilities: No
- Accessible: Yes

History
- Opened: 22 May 2000; 26 years ago

Services
Preceding station	İzmir Metro	Following station
Üçyol towards Narlıdere Kaymakamlık	M1	Çankaya towards Evka 3
Location

Konak is an underground station on the M1 Line of the İzmir Metro in central Konak. Located just south of Konak Square, it is one of the ten original stations of the metro system. The architecture of the station consists of a main hall with a high ceiling, with mezzanines on both sides. The only other station to share this architecture is Çankaya. Connection to İzdeniz municipal ferries from Konak Terminal as well as ESHOT city bus service is available. Service began on 24 March 2018, connection to the Konak Tram also became possible via Konak İskele station. The northern mezzanine has exits to the Konak Ferry Terminal, Konak Square, while the southern mezzanine has exits to the Konak city bus stops, via an underpass beneath Halil Rıfat Paşa Avenue.

Konak station was opened on 22 May 2000.

== Nearby Places of Interest ==
- Konak Square
  - İzmir Clock Tower
  - Yalı Mosque
- Kemeraltı
  - Hisar Mosque
- İzmir Art and Sculpture Museum
- Elhamra Theater
- Konak Theater
- İzmir Archaeological Museum
