= Çankaya =

Çankaya may refer to:

- Çankaya District, a district and municipality of Ankara Province, Turkey
- Çankaya, Ankara (neighbourhood), a neighbourhood in Çankaya District, Ankara Province, Turkey
- Çankaya, İzmir, a neighbourhood in Konak district of İzmir, Turkey
  - Çankaya (İzmir Metro), an underground station on the Üçyol-Bornova Line
- Çankaya Mansion, a presidential palace of Turkey
- Çankaya University, a university in Çankaya district of Ankara, Turkey
