= Poligon (İzmir Metro) =

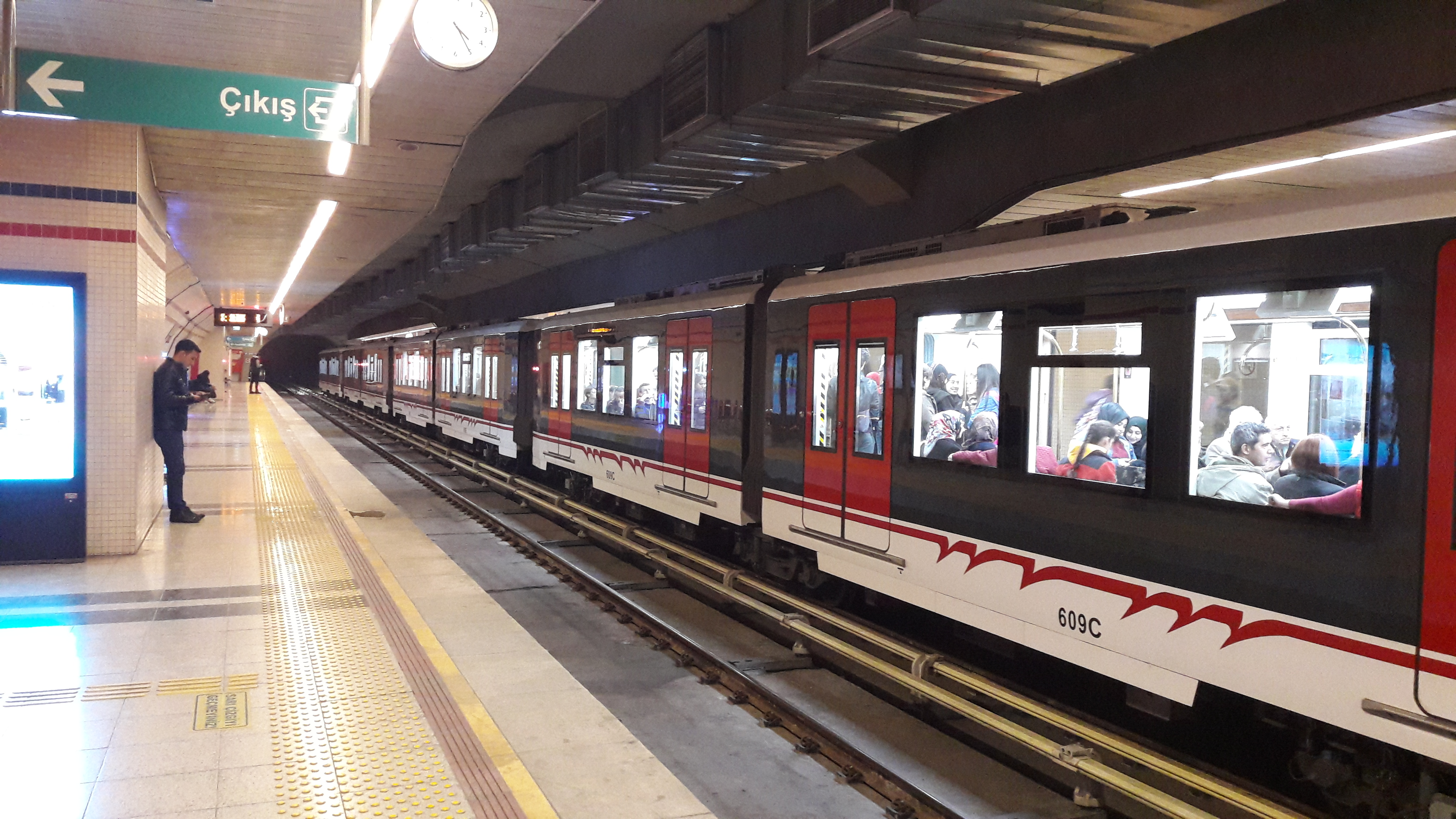
- An Evka 3-bound train at the station.

General information
- Location: İnönü Cd., Güzelyalı Mah., 35140; Konak
- Coordinates: 38.3932°N 27.0850°E
- System: İzmir Metro rapid transit station
- Owner: İzmir Metropolitan Municipality
- Operator: İzmir Metro A.Ş.
- Line: M1
- Platforms: 2 side platforms
- Tracks: 2
- Connections: ESHOT Bus: 581, 879, 950

Construction
- Parking: No
- Cycle facilities: No
- Accessible: Yes

History
- Opened: 26 July 2014; 12 years ago

Services
Preceding station	İzmir Metro	Following station
Fahrettin Altay towards Narlıdere Kaymakamlık	M1	Göztepe towards Evka 3
Location

Poligon is an underground station on the M1 Line of the İzmir Metro in Konak. Located under İnönü Avenue, it consists of two side platforms servicing two tracks. Connection to ESHOT bus service is available at street level.

Poligon was opened on 26 July 2014, along with Fahrettin Altay, and marked the completion of the much delayed westward extension from Üçyol to Fahrettin Altay, which had been under construction since 2005.

== Connections ==
ESHOT operates city bus service on İnönü Avenue.

ESHOT Bus service
Route number	Stop	Route	Location
581	Hıfzıssıha	F. Altay Aktarma — Halkapınar Metro	İnönü Avenue
879	Hıfzıssıha	F. Altay Aktarma — Gaziemir Semt Garajı	İnönü Avenue
950	Hıfzıssıha	Narlıdere — Konak	İnönü Avenue
