= Hatay (İzmir Metro) =

Metro station

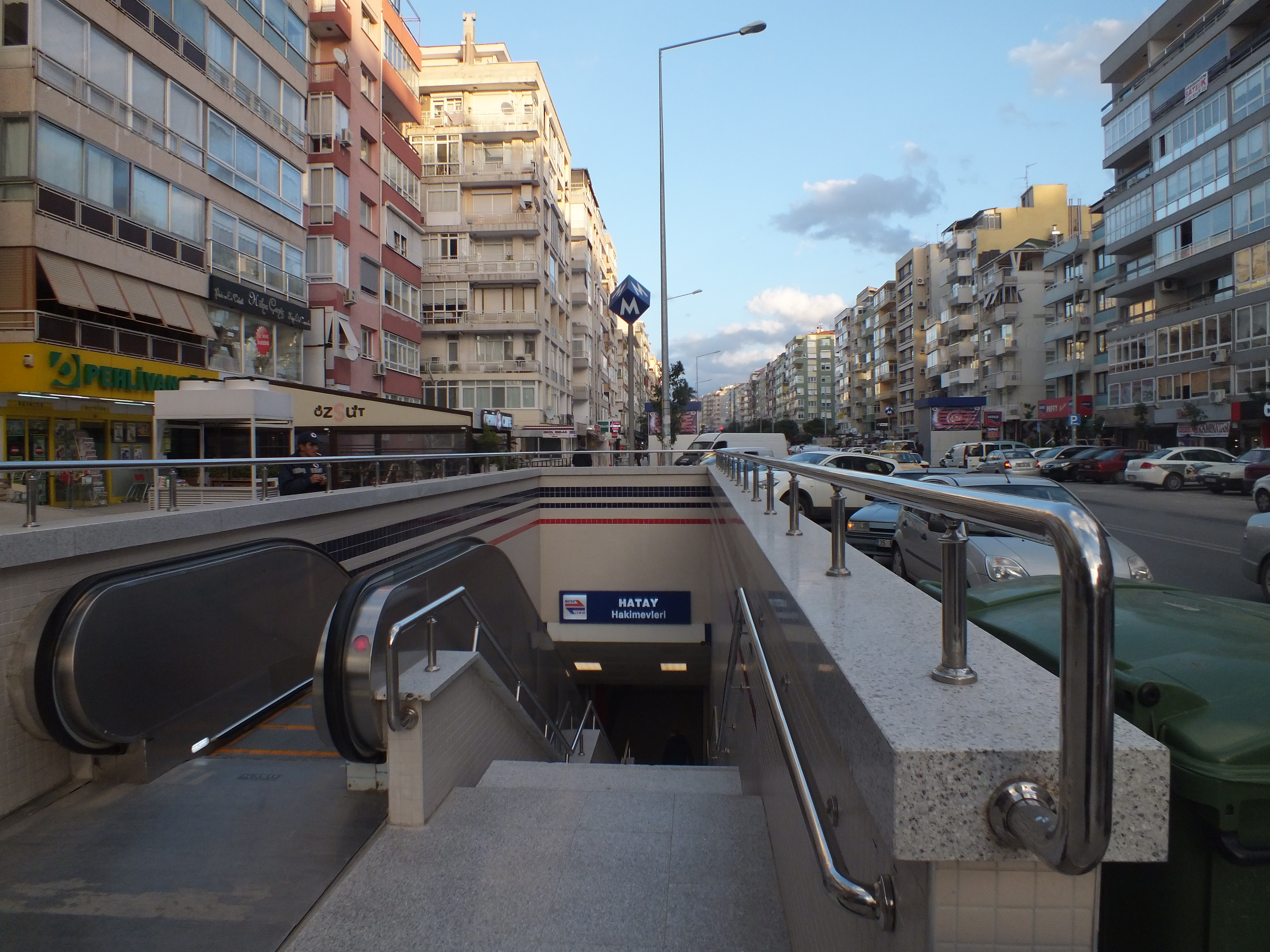
- Hakimevleri station portal.

General information
- Location: İnönü Cd., Çankaya Mah., 35280; Konak
- Coordinates: 38.4016°N 27.1021°E
- System: İzmir Metro rapid transit station
- Owner: İzmir Metropolitan Municipality
- Operator: İzmir Metro A.Ş.
- Line: M1
- Platforms: 2 side platforms
- Tracks: 2
- Connections: ESHOT Bus: 581, 950

Construction
- Parking: No
- Cycle facilities: No
- Accessible: Yes

History
- Opened: 29 December 2012; 13 years ago

Services
Preceding station	İzmir Metro	Following station
Göztepe towards Narlıdere Kaymakamlık	M1	İzmirspor towards Evka 3
Location

Hatay is an underground station on the M1 Line of the İzmir Metro in Hatay, Konak. Located under İnönü Avenue, it consists of two side platforms servicing two tracks. Connection to ESHOT bus service is available at street level.

Hatay was opened on 29 December 2012, along with İzmirspor station, as part of a two station westward extension of the line and was the western terminus of the line from 2012 to 2014, when the line was extended one stop further to Goztepe. The opening marked the partial completion of the extension to Fahrettin Altay, which was opened fully on 26 July 2014.

== Connections ==
ESHOT operates city bus service on İnönü Avenue.

ESHOT Bus service
Route number	Stop	Route	Location
581	Nokta	F. Altay Aktarma — Halkapınar Metro	İnönü Avenue
950	Nokta	Narlıdere — Konak	İnönü Avenue
