= Hatay (disambiguation) =

Hatay Province is the southernmost province in Turkey.

Hatay may also refer to:

- Hatay State or Republic of Hatay, a 1938–1939 transnational political entity
- Hatay Subregion, an area of Turkey comprising Hatay, Kahramanmaraş, and Osmaniye Provinces
- Hatay (electoral district), a constituency of the Grand National Assembly of Turkey
- Hatay Airport, in Hatay Province
- Hatay, Konak, a district of İzmir, Turkey
  - Hatay (İzmir Metro), a railway station

== See also ==
- Hà Tây Province, Vietnam
