= Halkapınar Maintenance Facility =

The Halkapınar Maintenance Facility is the maintenance facility and depot for the İzmir Metro. It is located in Halkapınar right next to İzmir Metro's Halkapınar station as well as the Halkapınar railway station. The facility was built in 2000 along with the metro itself. It can store 140 cars on its yard and service up to 7 trains at a time.

== Overview ==
There are 3 tracks that connect to the metro line: two tracks westbound (Hatay) and one track eastbound (Bornova-Evka 3). The facility also houses the headquarters for İzmir Metro A.Ş., the holding company responsible for operation of the line. Near the front entrance there is a preserved heritage tram from the 1920s that used to run on the streets of İzmir.
