= Trams in İzmir =

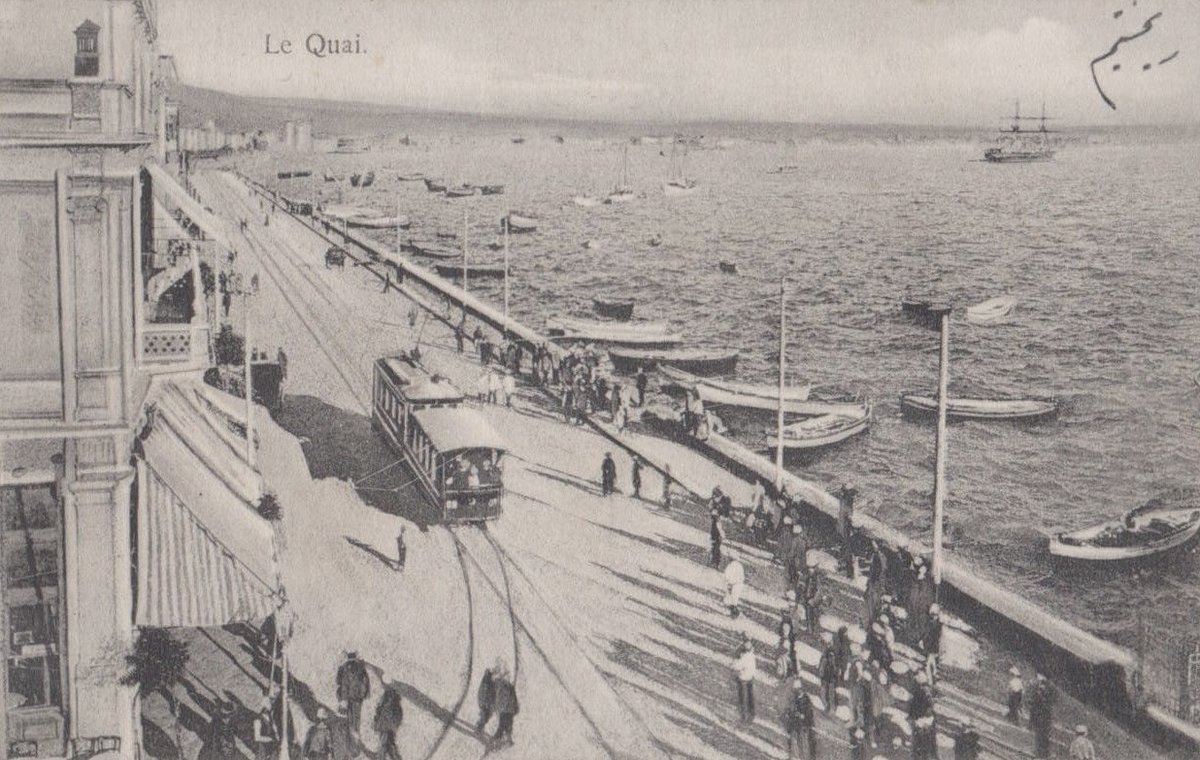
Alsancak-Pasaport Tram, 1910

İzmir (Smyrna) is Turkey's third largest city and most important port in Anatolia. In the past, İzmir had the second largest tram system in Turkey. Trams operated between 1890 and the early 1960s. The İzmir Municipality has been operating a new, larger tram system in the city since 2017. This new system is integrated with the İzmir Metro and the regional commuter system, İZBAN.

== History ==
The first tram line in İzmir opened in 1890, between Alsancak Terminal and Pasaport pier, along the Kordon (esplanade), to transport freight. This line also saw horse-drawn trams carry railway passengers from Pasaport (near the city center), to Alsancak station. In 1901, this line was extended to the newly built İzmir Clock Tower in Konak (the city center). The second line to open was in Karşıyaka, in 1906, from the Karşıyaka pier to the Karşıyaka railway station. In 1907, two more lines were completed in Karşıyaka: Karşıyaka pier-Alaybey and Karşıyaka pier-Bostanlı.

After World War I (1914–1918), the Ottoman Empire collapsed and the Turkish Republic was formed. The trams were electrified in 1927, as well as the opening of the Konak-Reşadiye (Güzelyalı) line. New pink painted trams began service and between 1927 and 1939, İzmir trams were at their peak. With the rise of the automobile, busses were becoming more popular and the inevitable decline of İzmir's trams began. The first lines to be discontinued were the 3 lines in Karşıyaka. On October 1, 1939, the Karşıyaka Municipality took up all tramlines in Karşıyaka. The Konak-Reşadiye line was abandoned in 1950, leaving the Konak-Alsancak line the last tram line in İzmir. The Alsancak-Pasaport portion was abandoned in 1956 and the last remaining line in İzmir (Konak-Pasaport) was taken up in the early 1960s. Ever since, İzmir has been without tramways. Some tram lines were converted to trolleybuses.

The Nostalgic Tram operated between Alsancak Harbor viaducts and Cumhuriyet Square. It began operation on 9 September 2020, with the first nostalgic tram, Boyoz. The second tram, Çiğdem, started to service on 11 November 2020. The third tram, Gevrek, is planned to start service soon. All of the trams were rubber-wheeled, and they were the first rubber wheeled trams since 1954. Due to insufficient demand, the line was decommissioned on May 28, 2024.

== Today ==
=== Tram İzmir ===
In April 2017, the Karşıyaka Tram went in service on a line of 8.8 km (5.5 mi) with 15 stations between Alaybey and Ataşehir Kavşağı. By March 2018, the 12.8 km (8.0 mi)-long Konak Tram line with 19 stations between Fahrettin Altay Square-Konak-Halkapınar have begun operation.In January 2024, the Çiğli Tram went in service on a line of 12 km (7.5 mi) with 14 stations between Ataşehir Kavşağı-Ataşehir Kavşağı (Ring).

== See also ==
- Trolleybuses in Izmir
- Rail transport in İzmir
