= Çankaya (İzmir Metro) =

Underground station on the M1 Line of the İzmir Metro in Konak, Turkey

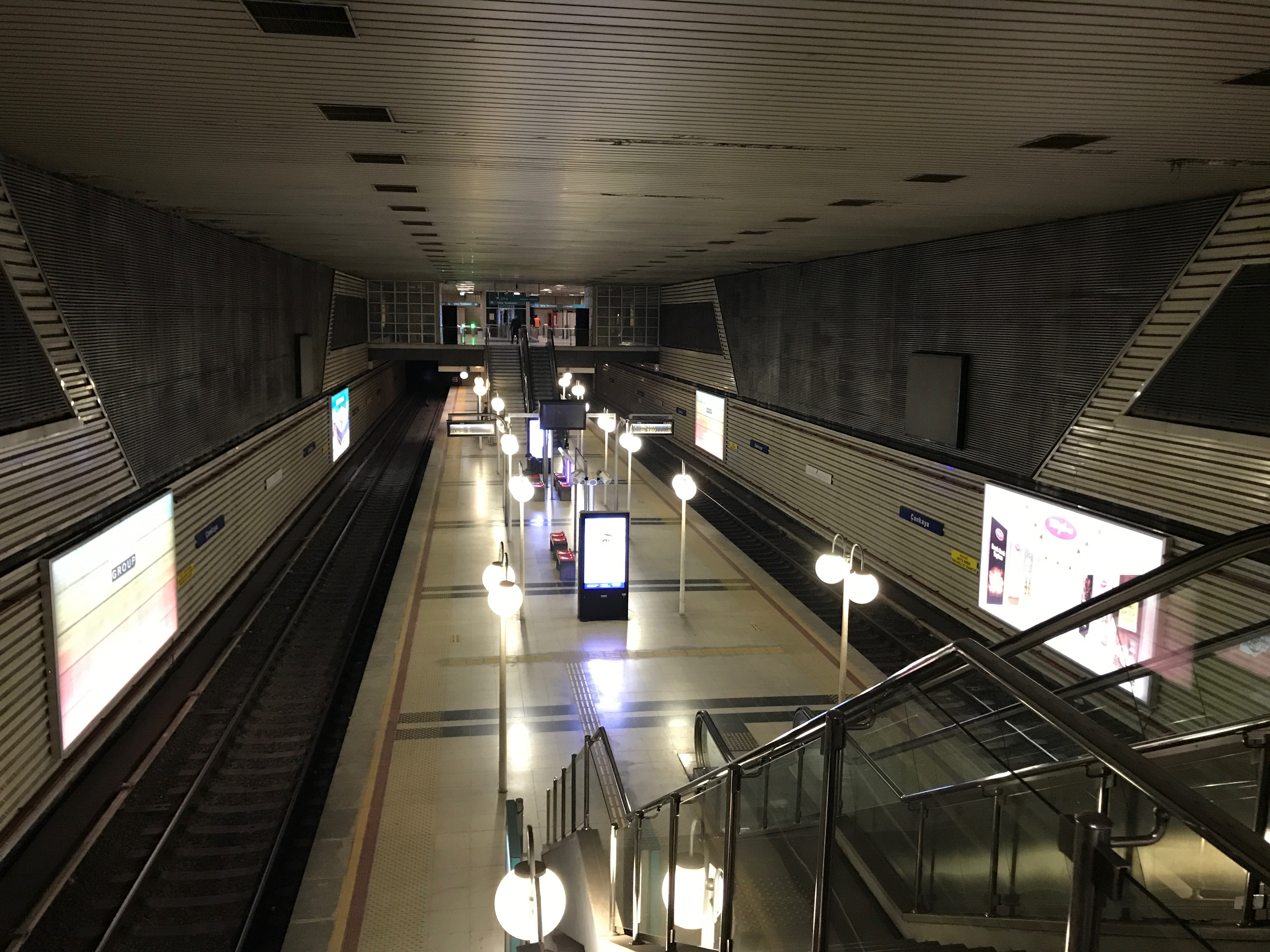

General information
- Location: Fevzi Paşa Blv., Çankaya Mah., 35210; Konak
- Coordinates: 38.4224°N 27.1360°E
- System: İzmir Metro rapid transit station
- Owner: İzmir Metropolitan Municipality
- Operator: İzmir Metro A.Ş.
- Line: M1
- Platforms: 1 island platform
- Tracks: 2
- Connections: Tram İzmir at Gazi Bulvarı; ESHOT Bus: 32, 39, 42, 44, 45, 46, 251, 838

Construction
- Parking: No
- Cycle facilities: No
- Accessible: Yes

History
- Opened: 22 May 2000; 26 years ago

Services
Preceding station	İzmir Metro	Following station
Konak towards Narlıdere Kaymakamlık	M1	Basmane towards Evka 3
Location

Çankaya is an underground station on the M1 Line of the İzmir Metro in Konak. Located beneath Fevzi Paşa Boulevard, it is one of the ten original stations of the metro system. The architecture of the station consists of a main hall with a high ceiling, with mezzanines on both sides. The only other station to share this architecture is Konak. Connection to ESHOT city bus service is available above ground. Service began on 24 March 2018, connection to the Konak Tram also became possible via Gazi Bulvarı station. Çankaya station is located near the northern entrance to the historic Kemeraltı marketplace.

Çankaya station was opened on 22 May 2000.

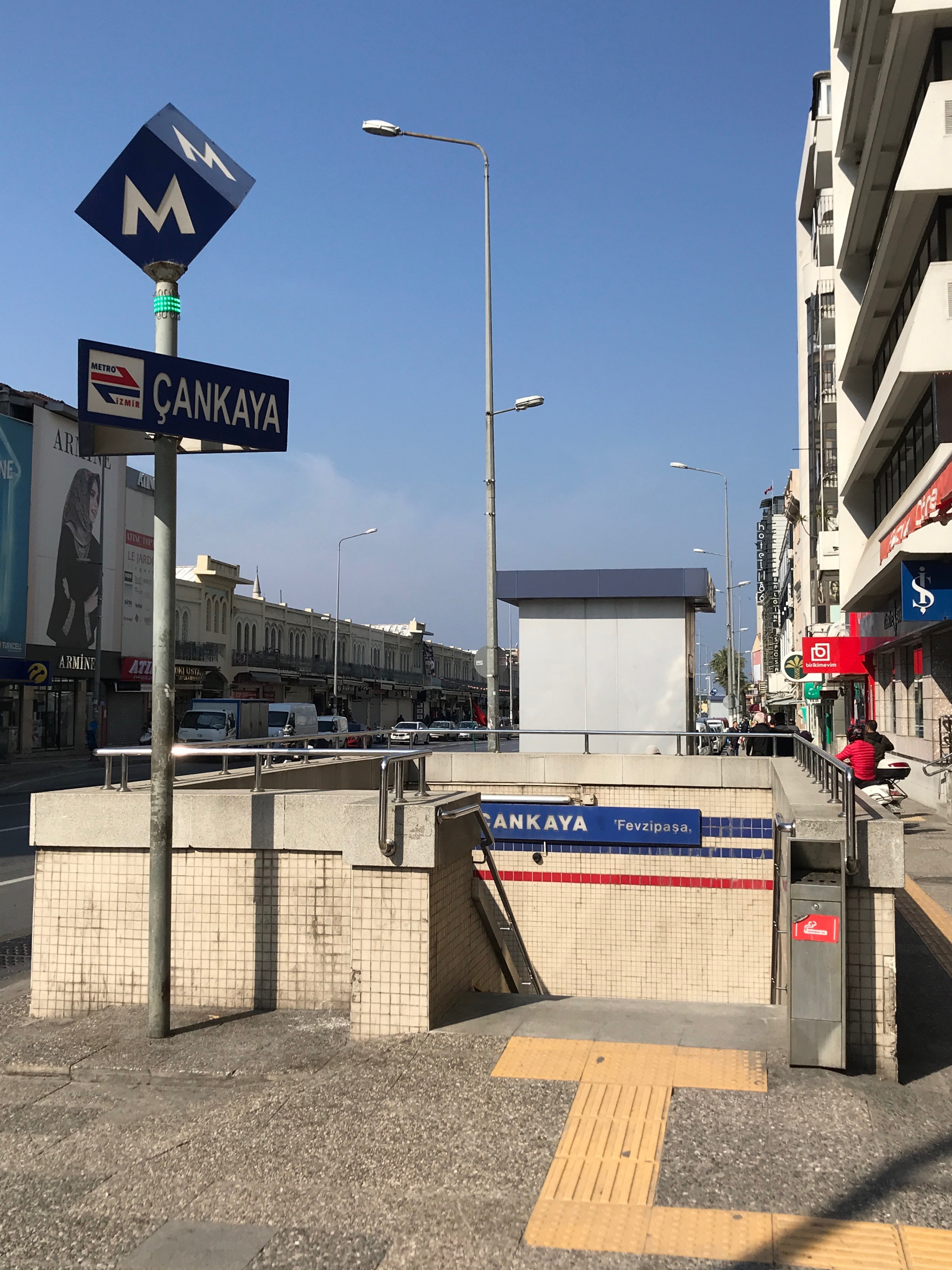
Station entrance on Fevzi Paşa Boulevard.

== Connections ==
ESHOT operates city bus service on Fevzipaşa boulevard.

ESHOT Bus service
Route number	Stop	Route	Location
39	Kavaflar	İsmetpaşa Mahallesi — Konak	Fevzi Paşa Boulevard
42	Kavaflar	Çınartepe — Konak	Fevzi Paşa Boulevard
44	Kavaflar	Mersinpınar — Konak	Fevzi Paşa Boulevard
45	Kavaflar	Gültepe — Konak	Fevzi Paşa Boulevard
46	Kavaflar	Çobançeşme — Konak	Fevzi Paşa Boulevard
470	Çankaya	Şirinyer — Lozan	Fevzi Paşa Boulevard
680	Çankaya	Bozyaka — Lozan	Fevzi Paşa Boulevard
691	Çankaya	Sosyal Konutlar — Lozan	Fevzi Paşa Boulevard
655	Çankaya	Üçyol — Lozan	Fevzi Paşa Boulevard
681	Çankaya	Fahrettin Altay — Lozan	Fevzi Paşa Boulevard

== Nearby Places of Interest ==
- Kemeraltı
  - Hisar Mosque
