= Yaşar University =

Private university in İzmir, Turkey

- Yaşar Üniversitesi
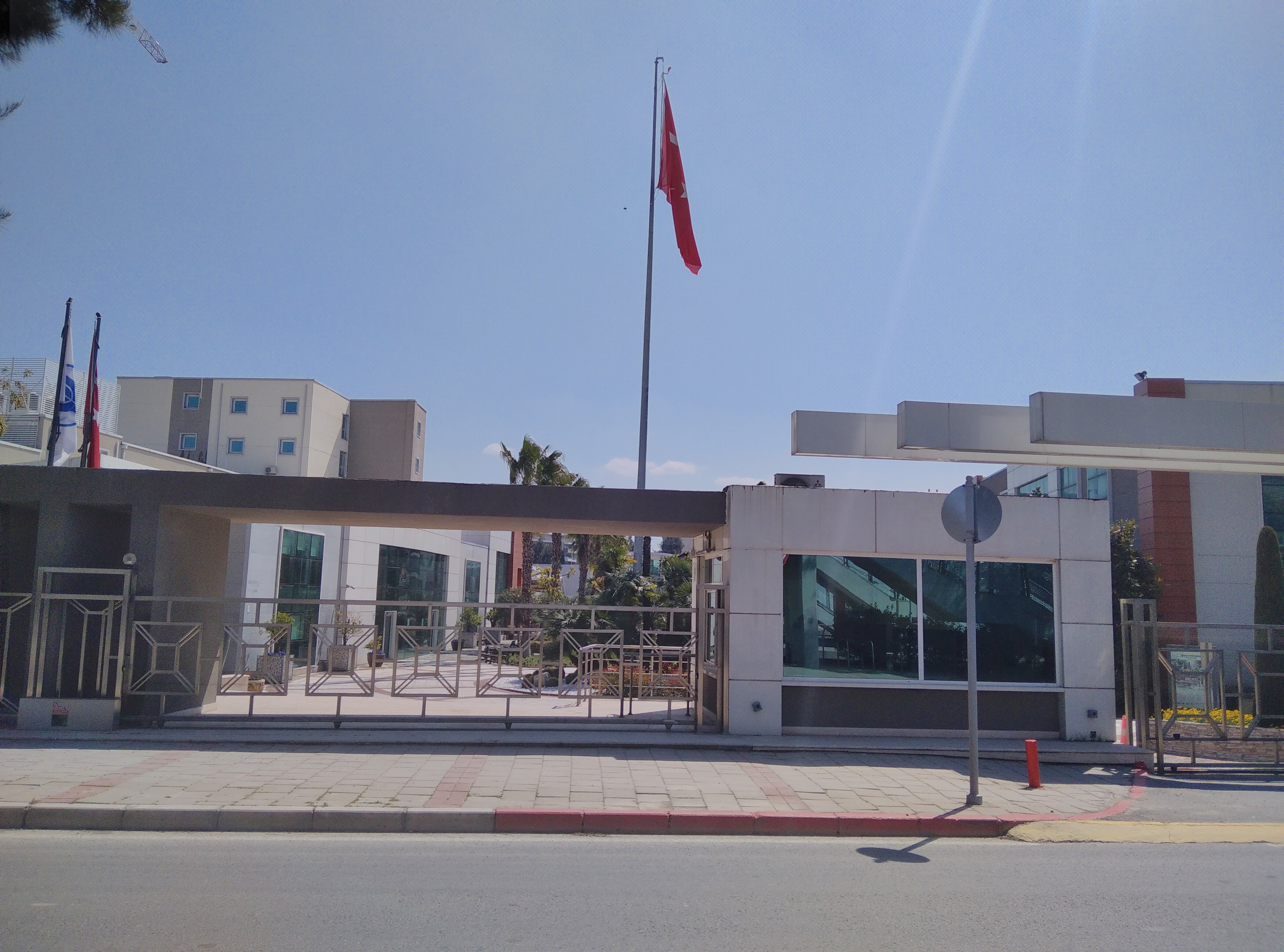
- Yaşar University
- Motto in English: Science, Unity, Success…
- Type: Foundation (non-profit)
- Established: March 29, 2001; 25 years ago
- Affiliations: Council of Higher Education (Turkey)
- Rector: Prof. Dr. Levent Kandiller
- Academic staff: 419 (2023–2024)
- Students: 9,765 (2023)
- Undergraduates: 7,058 (2023)
- Postgraduates: 517 (2023)
- Doctoral students: 133 (2023)
- Other students: 2,057 (2023)
- Location: İzmir, 35100, Turkey
- Language: English , Turkish , German , French
- Colors
- Mascot: Admiral
- Website: Official website

Yaşar University (Turkish: Yaşar Üniversitesi) is a university in İzmir, Turkey.

== History ==
Selcuk Yaşar Sports and Education Foundation decided to establish Yaşar University in 1999, as a modern university in the city of İzmir. The Turkish National Assembly approved the creation of the university on 29 March 2001. Education started within its Alsancak premises in the academic year of 2002–2003. The Selçuk Yaşar Bornova Campus was opened in 2008.

== Organization ==
Yaşar University is divided into seven undergraduate faculties which have 25 different academic programs. Undergraduate divisions include:

- Faculty of Communication: Public Relations and Advertising; Radio, Cinema and Television; Visual Communication Design
- Faculty of Economics and Administrative Sciences: Business Administration; Economics; International Logistics Management; International Trade and Finance; Travel Management and Tourism Guidance; International Relations. The language of instruction for all departments is English
- Faculty of Architecture: Architecture; Interior Architecture and Environmental Design
- Faculty of Science and Letters: English Language and Literature; Mathematics; Statistics; Psychology; Translation and Interpreting
- Faculty of Engineering: Computer Engineering; Electrical and Electronics Engineering; Energy Systems Engineering; Industrial Engineering; Software Engineering
- Faculty of Art and Design: Film Design; Graphic Design; Industrial Design; Music
- Faculty of Law: LLB in Law

The graduate program consists of two graduate schools; the Graduate School of Social Sciences and Graduate School of Natural and Applied Sciences. The graduate schools have 22 different Master's and PHD programs.

The vocational school offers nine associate degree programs.

The Yaşar University School of Foreign Languages provides an English preparatory year for students needing to reach the language level for faculty. Other languages taught at the School of Foreign Languages include: Russian, Spanish, Italian, German, Japanese, French, and Portuguese. Yaşar University is the first in Turkey to have its language school accredited by the Commission on English Language Program Accreditation (CEA).

== Campus ==
=== Selçuk Yaşar Campus ===
Located in the İzmir district of Bornova, the Selçuk Yaşar Campus serves as the main campus for Yaşar University.

==== Sports Center ====
The Yaşar University Sports Center facilities provides a variety of physical activities. The Sports Center includes; a gymnasium, tennis courts, dance studio, volleyball and basketball courts. The Sports Center organizes fitness training, club sports, intramural and ladder tournaments, instructional programmes and seminars.

==== Electronic Information and Documentation Center ====
Yaşar University's Electronic Information and Documentation Center adds to the University's education and research mission at the national and international level. Students and faculty are able to access a wide variety of sources, including audio-visual materials, journals and newspapers. The Electronic Information and Documentation center is classified according to the Library of Congress Classification System. Electronic resources include: over 50,000 e-books and 25 databases that reach 19,000 e-journals.

==== Media Center ====
Yasar University hosts a hi-tech media center. It is the first Turkish university where TV and radio studios broadcast in high definition. The Media Center produces regular television and radio programmes in multiple languages.

=== Alsancak Campus ===
The Yaşar University Alsancak Campus was home to the School of Foreign Languages until 2014. In 2014, all departments are united in Selçuk Yaşar Campus.
