= İzmir Metro =

Rapid transit system in İzmir, Turkey

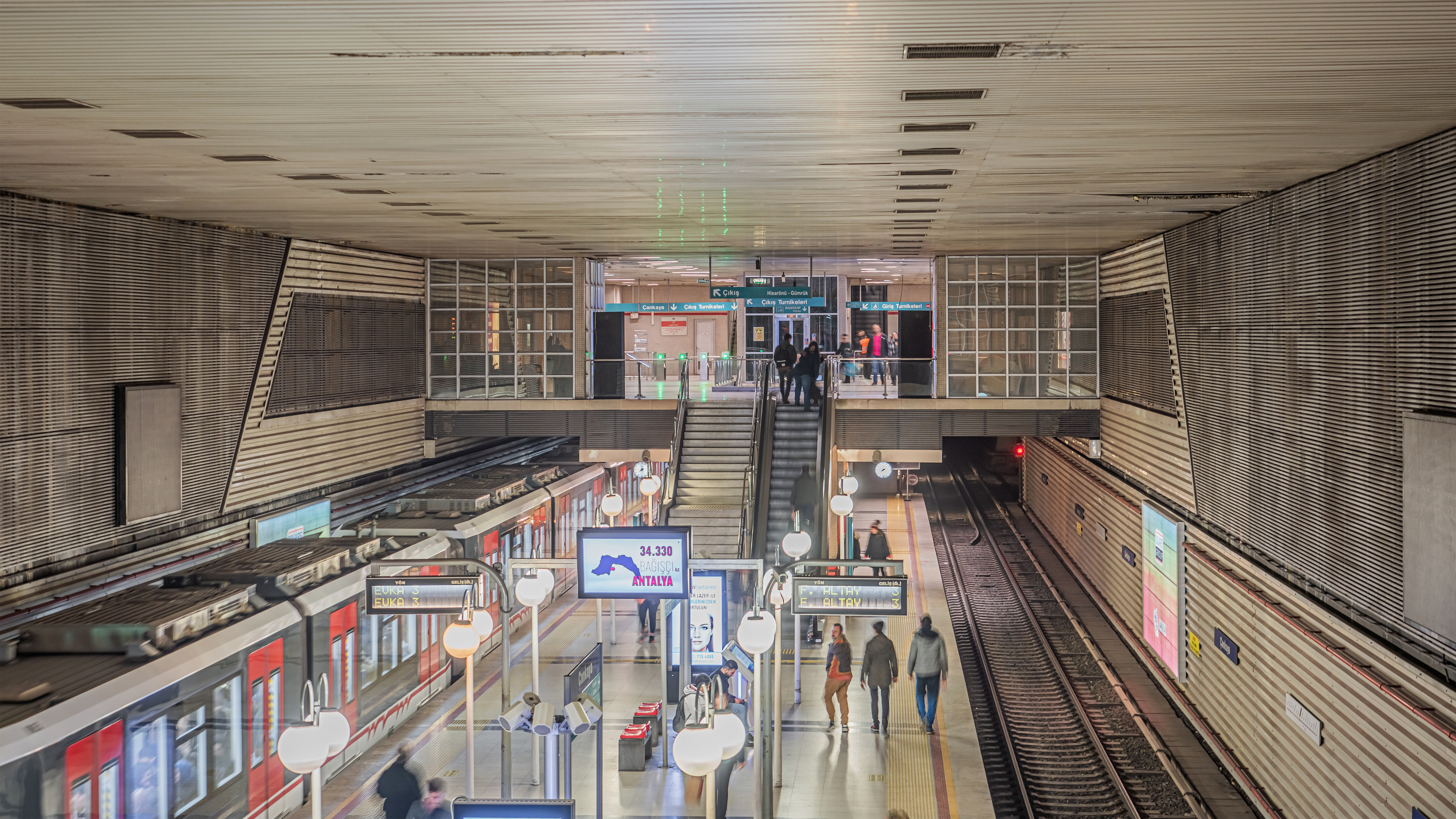
- Çankaya station of the İzmir Metro

Overview
- Native name: İzmir Metrosu
- Owner: İzmir Metropolitan Municipality
- Locale: İzmir, Turkey
- Transit type: Light metro
- Number of lines: 1 (1 under construction)
- Number of stations: 24
- Daily ridership: 173,000
- Chief executive: Ahmet Sinan Karakuzu
- Headquarters: Halkapınar
- Website: İzmir Metro

Operation
- Began operation: 22 April 2000; 26 years ago
- Operator: İzmir Metro A.Ş.
- Number of vehicles: 182
- Train length: 120 metres (393 ft 8 in)
- Headway: 4 min - Peak Hours 10 min - Max. Wait Time

Technical
- System length: 27 km (17 mi)
- Track gauge: 1,435 mm (4 ft 8 1/2 in) standard gauge
- Minimum radius of curvature: 75 metres (246 ft 1 in)
- Electrification: 750 V DC Third rail, bottom contact
- Average speed: 42 km/h (26 mph)
- Top speed: 90 km/h (56 mph) (designed); 80 km/h (50 mph) (maximum permitted)
System map

Station announcement for Hilal station in Turkish and English

The İzmir Metro (Turkish: İzmir Metrosu) is a light metro system serving the city of İzmir, Turkey. The current system, consisting of one line, starts from Narlıdere Kaymakamlık station in the southwestern portion of the metropolitan area and runs towards northeast to end at Evka-3 in Bornova. İzmir's metro line is 27 kilometres (17 mi) long, and serves 24 stations as of 4 March 2024.. The most recent expansion of the system was the Narlıdere extension, a 7.2-kilometre, seven-station westward extension from Fahrettin Altay, financed in part by the European Bank for Reconstruction and Development. Construction began on 9 June 2018, with completion originally expected by December 2021. The first six stations opened on 24 February 2024, with the final station, Narlıdere Kaymakamlık, opening on 4 March 2024 after nearly six years of construction. A second line, the M2 (Üçyol to Fuar İzmir), is currently under construction with 14 stations across 17.8 kilometres and is expected to open in 2027, with a projected daily ridership of 400,000 passengers.

== Overview ==
By 1990, it was thought that the existing public transport system in Izmir could no longer support the growing population. A plan was thought of to build a rapid transit network by rail to cope with this. A contract was signed in 1993, and the handover was in 1994. Construction had begun in 1995 and it was completed successfully in around 4 years. In May 2000, the system came into public service. Up to that moment, the total cost of the system had been $US 600 million. Yapı Merkezi was the main contractor for all design and civil works (tunnels, bridges, viaducts, stations, tracks, infrastructure, depots and workshops) as well as the third-rail power system.

AdTranz was responsible for the rolling stock and the signalling, power-supply and communication systems. (ABB Traction was subsequently purchased by Daimler and became AdTranz only to be purchased later by Bombardier.) The Izmir Light Rail Vehicle (LRV) is tailor-made for the LRTS. It is 3.67 m (12 ft 0 in) high (from head of rail), 2.65 m (8 ft 8 in) wide, and 23.5 m (77 ft 1 in) long (over couplers) with a maximum speed of 80 km/h (50 mph). The maximum acceleration is 1 m/s/s (2.2 mph/s) with a seating capacity of 44 and a standing capacity of 140.

All LRVs are self-powered and the drive and braking systems (with wheel-slip protection) are controlled by on-board computer. A train consists of two to five vehicles with driver's cabin at each end. The LRV is a six-axle articulated unit with three bogies. The first and last bogies are powered while the articulated bogie is trailing. The auxiliary power system is based on a static converter-inverter, supplied from a 750 VDC third rail and supplying 3-phase x 400 VAC at 50 Hz for compressor, fans, lights, battery charging, etc. The 24 VDC battery system supplies the on-board computer as well as other safety systems such as automatic train control (ATC), train radio, passenger displays, emergency lights, etc. The tunnel safety aspects have top priority.

A more ambitious rapid transit system, named İZBAN connects the north of the city, Aliağa to the south terminus of Cumaovası, via Adnan Menderes Airport and several other important financial and commercial areas such as Karşıyaka and Alsancak. The İzban and Metro are providing interchange with each other at Halkapınar and Hilal stations.

By the end of 2011, the Metro, or any other transport system in the city will no longer accept cash, or the jeton, (token) which is brought by cash and used to pass the ticket barriers at the stations. The Metro carries about 30 million passengers/year and to the end of September 2005 160 million passengers had travelled since the opening in May 2000.

== Stations ==
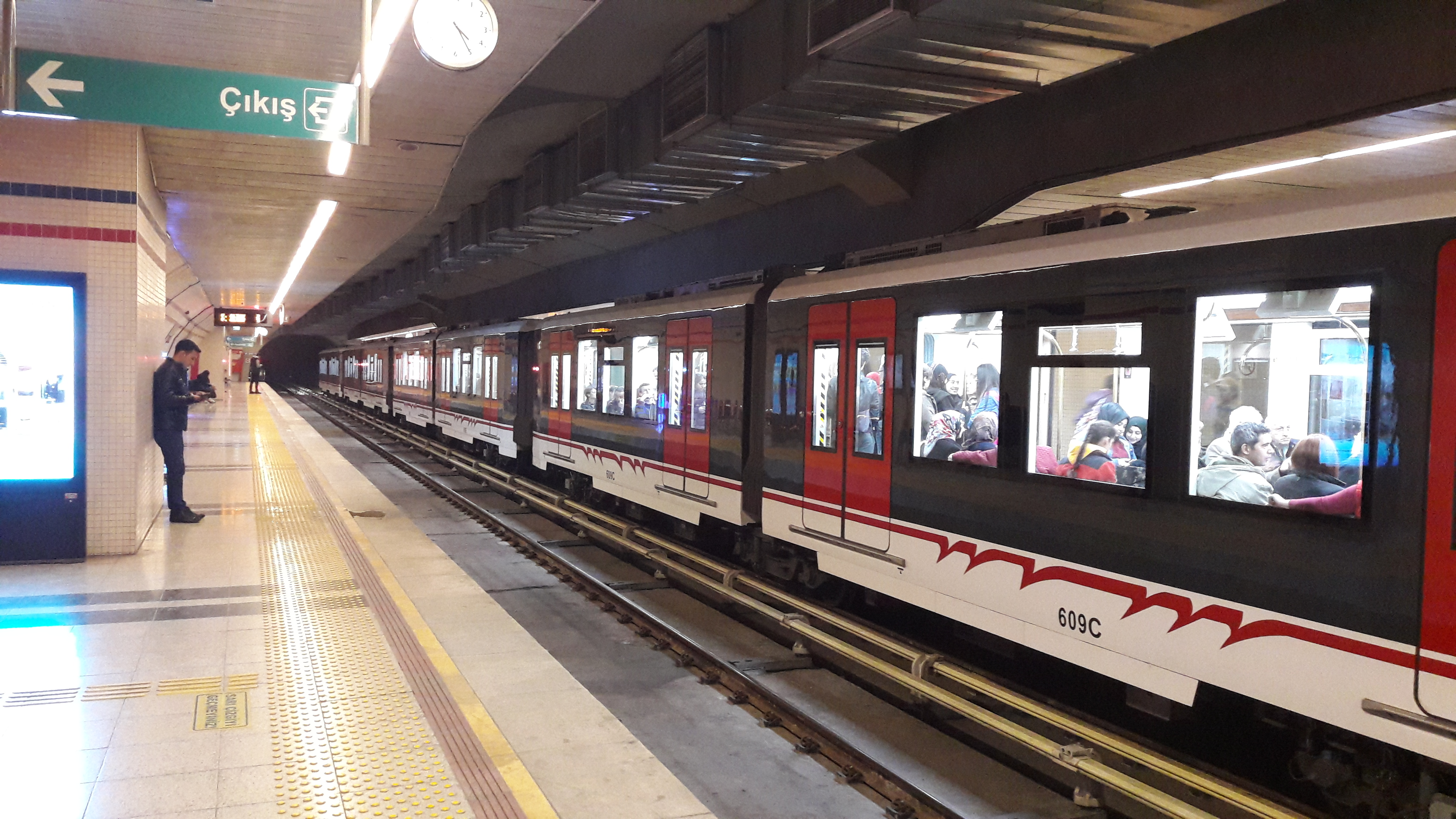
Poligon station of the İzmir Metro

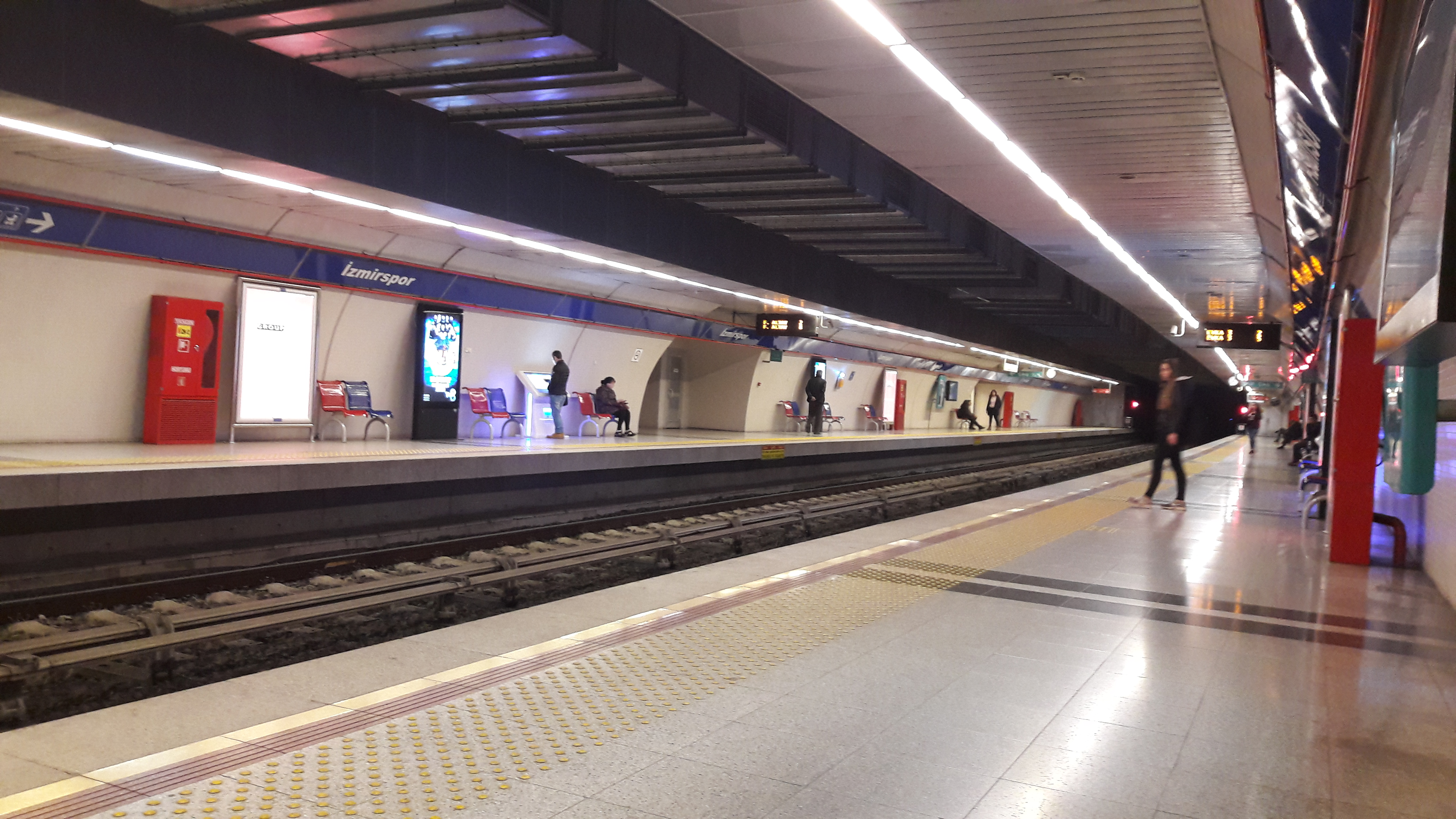
İzmirspor station of the İzmir Metro

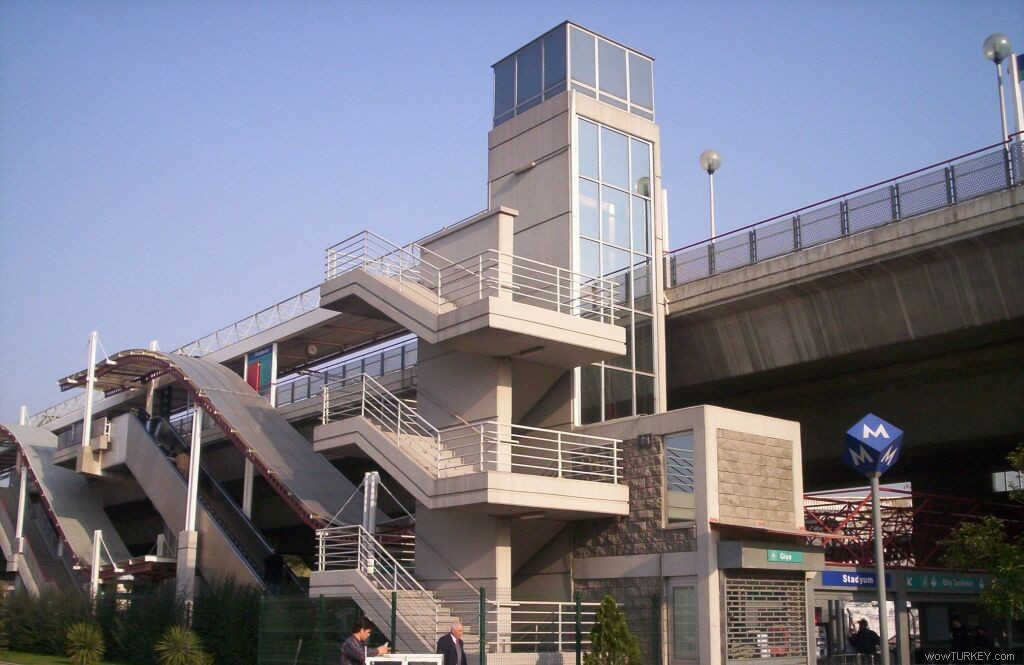
Stadyum station of the İzmir Metro

Station	Opening	Structure Construction	Structure Platform	Tracks	Transfer
Evka 3	30 March 2012	Cut-and-Cover Tunnel	2 Side Platforms	2	Bus
Ege Üniversitesi	30 March 2012	Cut-and-Cover Tunnel	2 Side Platforms	2	Bus
Bornova	22 May 2000	Splitting Tunnel	1 Island Platform	2	Bus
Bölge	22 May 2000	Grade	1 Island Platform	2	Bus
Sanayi	22 May 2000	Grade	1 Island Platform	2	Bus
Stadyum	22 May 2000	Viaduct	2 Side Platforms	2	Bus
Halkapınar	22 May 2000	Grade	2 Island Platforms	3	Bus, Tram, and Izban
Hilal	22 May 2000	Viaduct	2 Side Platforms	2	Izban
Basmane	22 May 2000	Cut-and-Cover Tunnel	1 Island Platform	2	Bus, National rail
Çankaya	22 May 2000	Cut-and-Cover Tunnel	1 Island Platform	2	Bus, Tram
Konak	22 May 2000	Cut-and-Cover Tunnel	1 Island Platform	2	Bus, Tram, and Ferry (nonstandard walking distance)
Üçyol	22 May 2000	Deep Tunnel	2 Side Platforms	2	Bus
İzmirspor	29 December 2012	Cut-and-Cover Tunnel	2 Side Platforms	2	Bus
Hatay	29 December 2012	Cut-and-Cover Tunnel	2 Side Platforms	2	Bus
Göztepe	25 March 2014	Deep Tunnel	2 Side Platforms	2	Bus
Poligon	26 July 2014	Cut-and-Cover Tunnel	2 Side Platforms	2	Bus
Güzelyalı	Cancelled but station shaft prepared for future use	Cut-and-Cover Tunnel	2 Side Platforms	2	Bus, Tram
Fahrettin Altay	26 July 2014		2 Side Platforms	2	Bus, Tram
Balçova	24 February 2024	Deep Tunnel	1 Island Platform	2	Bus
Çağdaş	24 February 2024	Deep Tunnel	1 Island Platform	2	Bus
Dokuz Eylül Üniversitesi Hastanesi	24 February 2024	Deep Tunnel	1 Island Platform	2	Bus
Güzel Sanatlar	24 February 2024	Deep Tunnel	1 Island Platform	2	Bus
Narlıdere İtfaiye	24 February 2024	Deep Tunnel	1 Island Platform	2	Bus
100. Yıl Cumhuriyet Şehitlik	24 February 2024	Deep Tunnel	1 Island Platform	2	Bus
Narlıdere Kaymakamlık	4 March 2024	Deep Tunnel	1 Island Platform	2	Bus

== Future extensions ==
Line	Stations	Status
Evka 3 - Bornova Merkez	1	Project tenders complete. Construction tenders took place in 2016. Halted by court order.
Üçyol - Fuar İzmir	13	Construction started in 2022.
Narlıdere Kaymakamlık - Zeytinalanı	11	No progress.
Konak - Menderes	18	The project is approved by the Ministry of Transport and Infrastructure.
Bornova Merkez-Menemen Plastik OSB 1	33	No progress.
Halkapınar - Otogar (Intercity Bus Terminal)	5	The project is planned to be built as an İZBAN line instead of a metro. (This project is being evaluated together with the planned Ankara-İzmir High Speed Rail Line, of which the first part of construction has begun.)

== See also ==
- İZBAN
- Rail transport in İzmir
- Tram İzmir
