= Ege Üniversitesi (İzmir Metro) =

Rapid transit station

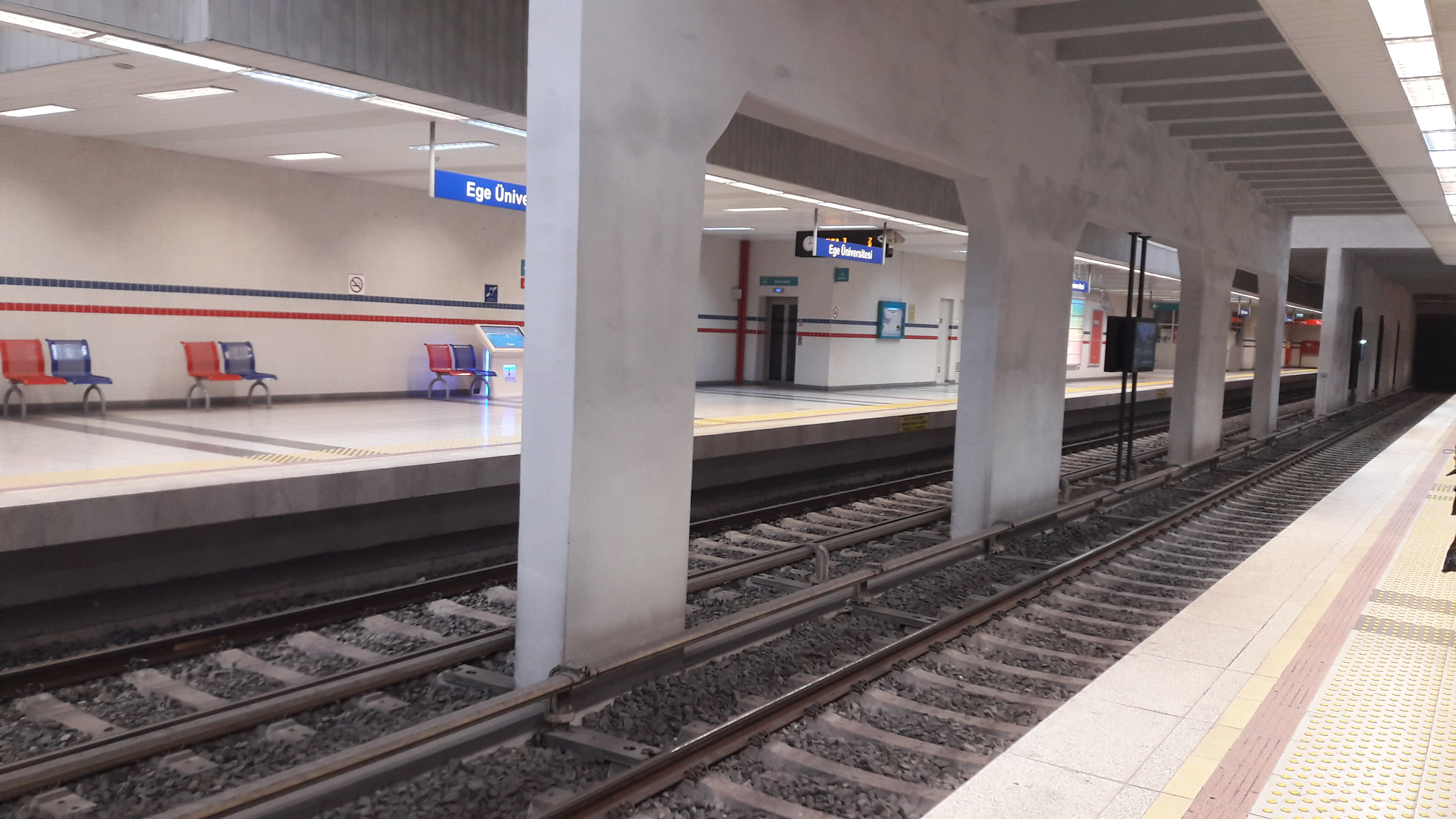

General information
- Location: Ege Üniversitesi, Erzene Mah., 35040; Bornova
- Coordinates: 38.4595°N 27.2287°E
- System: İzmir Metro rapid transit station
- Owner: İzmir Metropolitan Municipality
- Operator: İzmir Metro A.Ş.
- Line: M1
- Platforms: 2 side platforms
- Tracks: 2

Construction
- Structure type: Underground
- Parking: No
- Cycle facilities: No
- Accessible: Yes

History
- Opened: 1979 (railway station)
- Closed: 1990-2012
- Rebuilt: 20 March 2012; 14 years ago (İzmir Metro station)

Services
Preceding station	İzmir Metro	Following station
Bornova towards Narlıdere Kaymakamlık	M1	Evka 3 Terminus
Former services
Preceding station	Turkish State Railways	Following station
Bornova towards İzmir (Basmane)	Bornova suburban	Terminus
Location

Ege Üniversitesi is an underground station on the M1 Line of the İzmir Metro in Bornova. It is located within the campus of Ege University near the site of the former Ege Üniversitesi railway station. The metro station was opened on 20 March 2012 as part of the 2.3 km (1.4 mi) eastward extension from Bornova to Evka 3.

== History ==
Ege Üniversitesi was originally a station on the Bornova suburban line, built in 1979 by the Turkish State Railways. The site of this station was located about 200 m (660 ft) south of the current station near the university's Science Faculty building. The State Railway operated commuter trains from Basmane station in Konak to Ege University, via central Bornova. The station, along with the line east of Bornova station, was closed down in 1990 at the request of the university directorate. Starting in 1996, the railway line west of Bornova station was converted to a rapid transit line and began operations in 2000. The tracks east of Bornova into the campus were still in place until 2007, when the İzmir Metropolitan Municipality began construction of the metro's eastward expansion to Evka 3. Ege Üniversitesi station was rebuilt as a modern underground metro station with two side platforms serving two tracks. The station opened on 20 March 2012, 22 years after the railway station was closed.
