= Bornova Branch =

The Bornova Railway Branch was a 5.9 km long railway line, from Halkapınar to Bornova, Turkey, that branched from the SCP's main line at Halkapınar. The line was completed by the Smyrne Cassaba & Prolongements in 1866. TCDD absorbed the SCP on June 1, 1934 and took over ownership of the line. Usage decreased in the 1970s and the line was abandoned in the early 1990s. This line is now a part of the Izmir Metro.
