= Fahrettin Altay (İzmir Metro) =

İzmir Subway Station

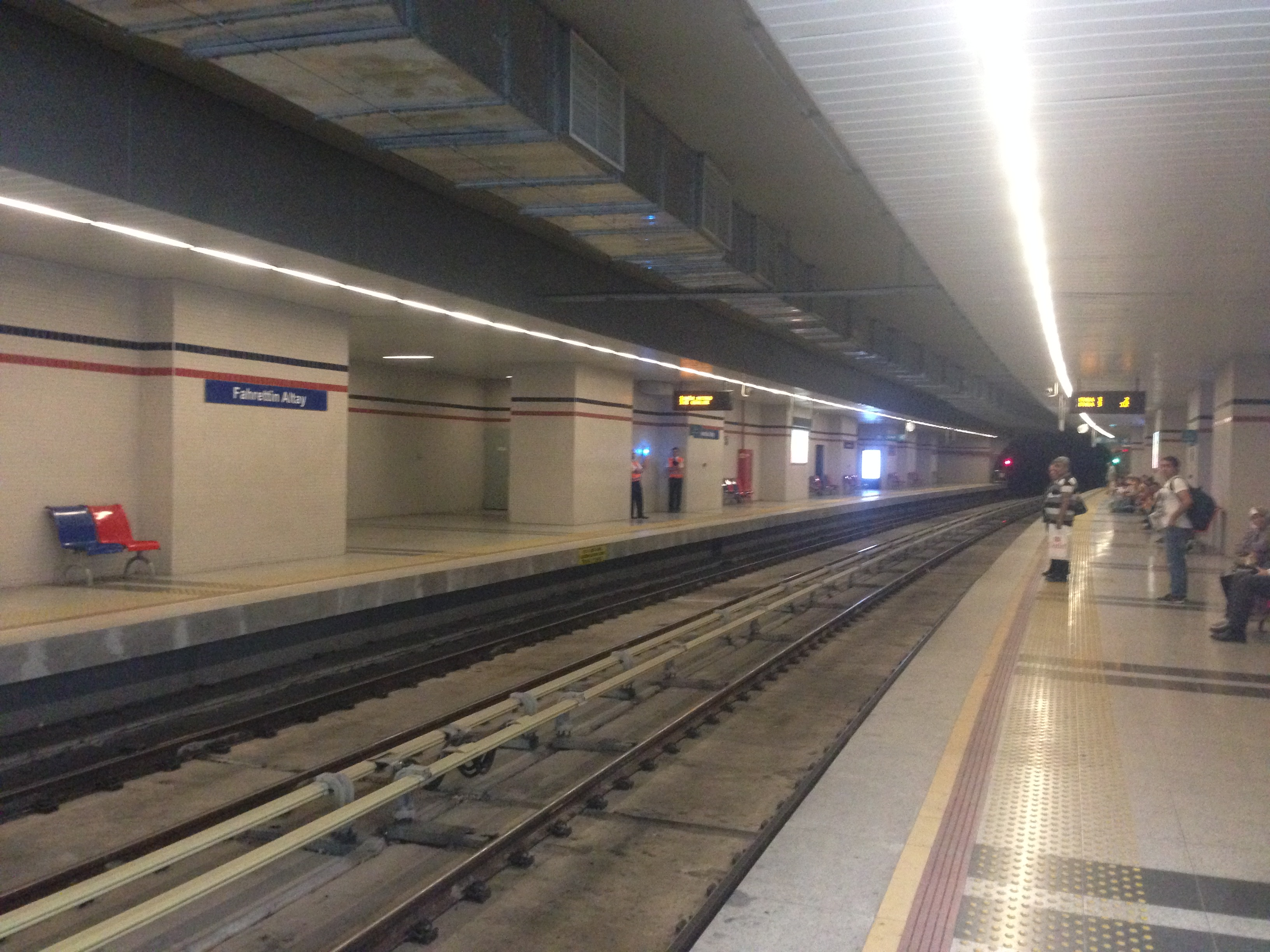

General information
- Location: Fahrettin Altay Meydanı, Fahrettin Altay Mah., 35140; Karabağlar
- Coordinates: 38.3971°N 27.0700°E
- System: İzmir Metro rapid transit station
- Owner: İzmir Metropolitan Municipality
- Operator: İzmir Metro A.Ş.
- Line: M1
- Platforms: 2 side platforms
- Tracks: 2
- Connections: Tram İzmir at Fahrettin Altay; ESHOT Bus: Fahrettin Altay Meydan 2: 5, 6, 7, 24, 25, 202, 311, 480, 510, 551, 650, 811, 945, 950, 977; Fahrettin Altay Meydan 3: 8, 10, 17, 671, 690, 873, 969; Fahrettin Altay Meydan 5: 5, 6, 7, 10, 24, 25, 202, 480, 486, 510, 650, 977; Fahrettin Altay Meydan 6: 517, 681, 811, 879, 950; Fahrettin Altay Meydan 7: 517, 681, 879, 950; Fahrettin Altay Meydan 8: 311, 551, 945, 946; Fahrettin Altay Meydan 9: 5, 6, 7, 10, 24, 25, 82, 167, 202, 305, 311, 321, 480, 510, 551, 650, 675, 684, 883, 909, 945, 946, 971, 975, 977, 981, 982, 983, 984, 985, 987

Construction
- Parking: No
- Cycle facilities: No
- Accessible: Yes

History
- Opened: 26 July 2014; 12 years ago
- Electrified: 750V DC Third rail

Services
Preceding station	İzmir Metro	Following station
Balçova towards Narlıdere Kaymakamlık	M1	Poligon towards Evka 3
Location

Fahrettin Altay is an underground station of the İzmir Metro's only operating line, the M1. Located under Fahrettin Altay square, the station has two side platforms servicing two tracks. The station was opened on 26 July 2014, after 9 years of delayed construction. The station was a terminal station from 2014 to 2024, until line extended to Narlıdere.

The station offers connections to regional buses to Çeşme, Urla, Seferihisar and Karaburun, which depart from a terminal within walking distance to Fahrettin Altay square.

== History ==
Construction of the six station expansion of the subway line, west from Üçyol, began in 2005 with completion expected by April 2007. The contract was awarded in March and groundbreaking began on 5 July. However, due to disagreements between the İzmir Metropolitan Municipality and the company contracted with building the line, construction halted on 14 February 2006 and the contract was cancelled in November. A new contract was awarded on 23 January 2007, with completion expected 31 October 2008. However the company could not reach the deadline and the contract was cancelled on 13 August 2009. The İzmir Municipality finished the remaining works, albeit at a slow pace, and completed the extension, opening Fahrettin Altay station on 26 July 2014.

== Connections ==
ESHOT operates city bus service on Fahrettin Altay Square.

ESHOT Bus service
Route number	Stop	Route	Location
5	Fahrettin Altay Meydan 2, Fahrettin Altay Meydan 5, Fahrettin Altay Meydan 9	Narlıdere — Üçkuyular İskele	Fahrettin Altay Square
6	Fahrettin Altay Meydan 2, Fahrettin Altay Meydan 5, Fahrettin Altay Meydan 9	Arıkent — Üçkuyular İskele	Fahrettin Altay Square
7	Fahrettin Altay Meydan 2, Fahrettin Altay Meydan 5, Fahrettin Altay Meydan 9	Sahilevleri — Üçkuyular İskele	Fahrettin Altay Square
8	Fahrettin Altay Meydan 3	Güzelbahçe — F. Altay Aktarma Merkezi	Fahrettin Altay Square
10	Fahrettin Altay Meydan 3, Fahrettin Altay Meydan 5, Fahrettin Altay Meydan 9	Üçkuyular İskele — Konak	Fahrettin Altay Square
17	Fahrettin Altay Meydan 3	Uzundere Toplu Konutları — F. Altay Aktarma Merkezi	Fahrettin Altay Square
24	Fahrettin Altay Meydan 2, Fahrettin Altay Meydan 5, Fahrettin Altay Meydan 9	Kavacık — Üçkuyular İskele	Fahrettin Altay Square
25	Fahrettin Altay Meydan 2, Fahrettin Altay Meydan 5, Fahrettin Altay Meydan 9	Oyunlar Köyü — Üçkuyular İskele	Fahrettin Altay Square
82	Fahrettin Altay Meydan 9	Siteler — F. Altay Aktarma Merkezi	Fahrettin Altay Square
167	Fahrettin Altay Meydan 9	Balçova Kabristan — F. Altay Aktarma Merkezi	Fahrettin Altay Square
202	Fahrettin Altay Meydan 2, Fahrettin Altay Meydan 5, Fahrettin Altay Meydan 9	Cumhuriyet Meydanı — Havalimanı (Airport)	Fahrettin Altay Square
305	Fahrettin Altay Meydan 9	2. İnönü Mahallesi — F. Altay Aktarma Merkezi	Fahrettin Altay Square
311	Fahrettin Altay Meydan 2, Fahrettin Altay Meydan 8, Fahrettin Altay Meydan 9	İnciraltı — F. Altay	Fahrettin Altay Square
321	Fahrettin Altay Meydan 9	Çamlı — F. Altay Aktarma Merkezi	Fahrettin Altay Square
480	Fahrettin Altay Meydan 2, Fahrettin Altay Meydan 5, Fahrettin Altay Meydan 9	İnciraltı — Üçkuyular İskele	Fahrettin Altay Square
486	Fahrettin Altay Meydan 5	Oyak Sitesi — İnciraltı	Fahrettin Altay Square
510	Fahrettin Altay Meydan 2, Fahrettin Altay Meydan 5, Fahrettin Altay Meydan 9	Gaziemir — Balçova	Fahrettin Altay Square
517	Fahrettin Altay Meydan 6, Fahrettin Altay Meydan 7	Uzundere Toplu Konutları — F. Altay	Fahrettin Altay Square
551	Fahrettin Altay Meydan 2, Fahrettin Altay Meydan 8, Fahrettin Altay Meydan 9	Narlıdere — F. Altay	Fahrettin Altay Square
650	Fahrettin Altay Meydan 2, Fahrettin Altay Meydan 5, Fahrettin Altay Meydan 9	Fuar İzmir — Balçova	Fahrettin Altay Square
671	Fahrettin Altay Meydan 3	Şirinyer Aktarma Merkezi — F. Altay Aktarma Merkezi	Fahrettin Altay Square
675 (express bus)	Fahrettin Altay Meydan 9	Seferihisar — F. Altay Aktarma Merkezi	Fahrettin Altay Square
681	Fahrettin Altay Meydan 6, Fahrettin Altay Meydan 7	F. Altay — Lozan Meydanı	Fahrettin Altay Square
684 (express bus)	Fahrettin Altay Meydan 9	Urla — F. Altay Aktarma Merkezi	Fahrettin Altay Square
690 (limited service express)	Fahrettin Altay Meydan 3	Tınaztepe — F. Altay	Fahrettin Altay Square
811	Fahrettin Altay Meydan 2, Fahrettin Altay Meydan 6	Engelliler Merkezi — Montrö	Fahrettin Altay Square
873	Fahrettin Altay Meydan 3	Yenitepe Evleri — Fahrettin Altay Aktarma	Fahrettin Altay Square
879	Fahrettin Altay Meydan 6, Fahrettin Altay Meydan 7	F. Altay — Gaziemir Semt Garajı	Fahrettin Altay Square
883 (express bus)	Fahrettin Altay Meydan 9	İYTE — F. Altay Aktarma Merkezi	Fahrettin Altay Square
909	Fahrettin Altay Meydan 9	Zeytinalanı — F. Altay Aktarma Merkezi	Fahrettin Altay Square
945	Fahrettin Altay Meydan 2, Fahrettin Altay Meydan 8, Fahrettin Altay Meydan 9	Esentepe — Üçkuyular İskele	Fahrettin Altay Square
946	Fahrettin Altay Meydan 8, Fahrettin Altay Meydan 9	General Kazım Özalp Mah. — Üçkuyular İskele	Fahrettin Altay Square
950 (night bus)	Fahrettin Altay Meydan 2, Fahrettin Altay Meydan 6, Fahrettin Altay Meydan 7	Narlıdere — Konak	Fahrettin Altay Square
969	Fahrettin Altay Meydan 3	Balçova — F. Altay Aktarma Merkezi	Fahrettin Altay Square
971	Fahrettin Altay Meydan 9	Narbel — F. Altay Aktarma Merkezi	Fahrettin Altay Square
975	Fahrettin Altay Meydan 9	Seferihisar — F. Altay Aktarma	Fahrettin Altay Square
977	Fahrettin Altay Meydan 2, Fahrettin Altay Meydan 5, Fahrettin Altay Meydan 9	İzmir Demokrasi Üniversitesi — Üçkuyular İskele	Fahrettin Altay Square
981	Fahrettin Altay Meydan 9	Balıklıova — F. Altay Aktarma Merkezi	Fahrettin Altay Square
982	Fahrettin Altay Meydan 9	İYTE — F. Altay Aktarma Merkezi	Fahrettin Altay Square
983	Fahrettin Altay Meydan 9	Bademler — F. Altay Aktarma Merkezi	Fahrettin Altay Square
984	Fahrettin Altay Meydan 9	Urla — F. Altay Aktarma Merkezi	Fahrettin Altay Square
985	Fahrettin Altay Meydan 9	Seferihisar — F. Altay Aktarma Merkezi	Fahrettin Altay Square
987	Fahrettin Altay Meydan 9	Ürkmez — F. Altay Aktarma Merkezi	Fahrettin Altay Square

== Station Layout ==
S	Street level	Exit/entrance, buses
M	Mezzanine level	Ticket machines, turnstiles
LM	Lower Mezzanine level
P Platform level
P Platform level	Platform 1, doors will open on the right
P Platform level	Track 1	M1 toward Narlıdere Kaymakamlık (Balçova) →
P Platform level	Track 2	M1 toward Evka 3 (Poligon) →
P Platform level	Platform B, doors will open on the right
