= Evka 3 (İzmir Metro) =

Rapid transit station

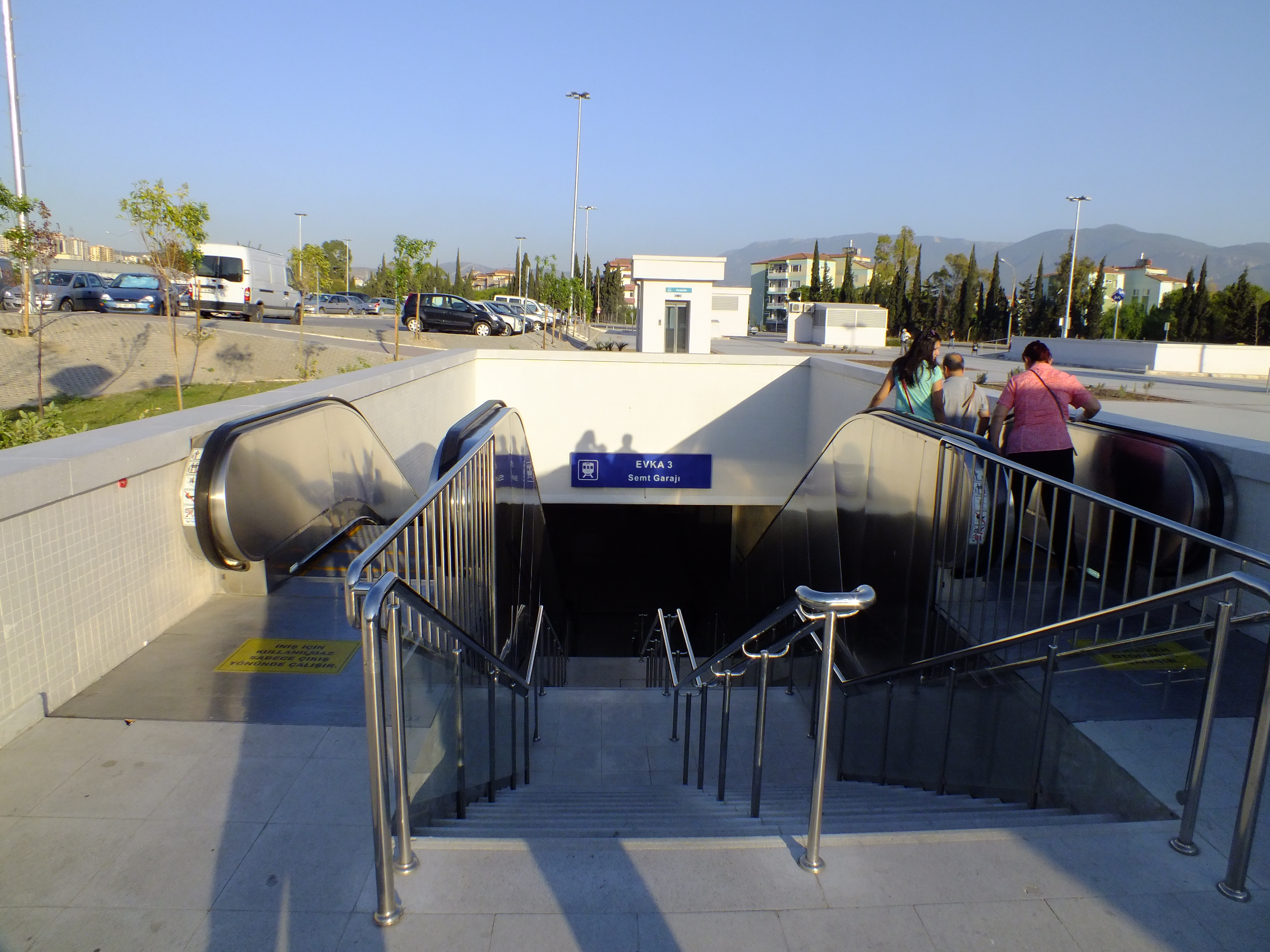
- The northwestern portal to Evka 3 station.

General information
- Location: Erzene Mah., 35040; Bornova
- Coordinates: 38.4650°N 27.2286°E
- System: İzmir Metro rapid transit station
- Owner: İzmir Metro A.Ş.
- Operator: İzmir Metro A.Ş.
- Line: M1
- Platforms: 2 side platform
- Tracks: 2
- Connections: ESHOT Bus: 63, 67, 111, 114, 214, 315, 316, 317, 365, 449, 765

Construction
- Parking: Yes
- Cycle facilities: No
- Accessible: Yes

History
- Opened: 30 March 2012; 14 years ago

Services
Preceding station	İzmir Metro	Following station
Ege Üniversitesi towards Narlıdere Kaymakamlık	M1	Terminus
Location

Evka 3 is the eastern terminus of the F. Altay—Evka 3 Line of the İzmir Metro. The station opened on 30 March 2012, along with Ege Üniversitesi station, as part of a 2.3 km (1.4 mi) eastward expansion. The line is expected to be extended further, this time back west, from Evka 3 to central Bornova. Evka 3 consists of two side platforms serving two tracks.

== Station Layout ==
S	Street level	Exit/entrance, buses
M	Mezzanine level	Ticket machines, turnstiles
P Platform level
P Platform level	Platform 1, doors will open on the right
P Platform level	Track 1	← M1 toward Fahrettin Altay (Ege Üniversitesi)
P Platform level	Track 2	Passenger drop-off only
P Platform level	Platform B, doors will open on the right
