= Green Mansion (İzmir) =

Building in İzmir, Turkey

- Yeşil Köşk
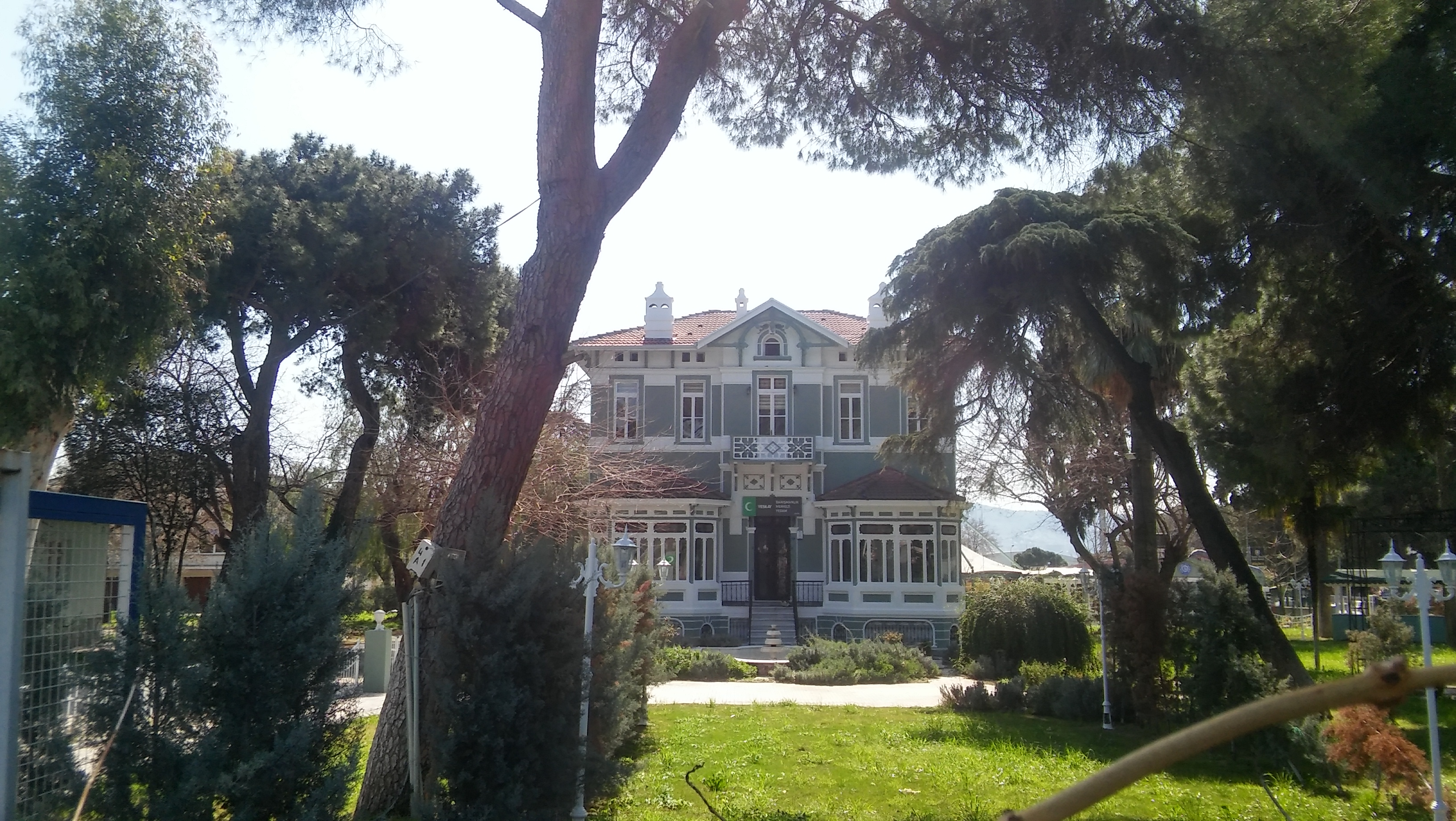
- Alternative names: Pandespanian Mansion

General information
- Location: Bornova, İzmir, Turkey
- Coordinates: 38°27′28.4″N 27°12′59.9″E
- Completed: 1880

Technical details
- Floor count: 3

Green Mansion (Turkish: Yeşil Köşk) or Pandespanian Mansion (Turkish: Pandespanian Köşkü), is a historical building located in Bornova, İzmir. The mansion, which was used as the guesthouse of Ege University after its first restoration in 1986, was restored in 1993, 1995 and 2004 and started to be used in a way that university employees and students can spend time.

== See also ==
- Levantine mansions of İzmir
