= Holy Church of the Archangels (Taxiarchon) =

Church in Mantamados, Greece

Coordinates: 39.3171°N 26.3382°E

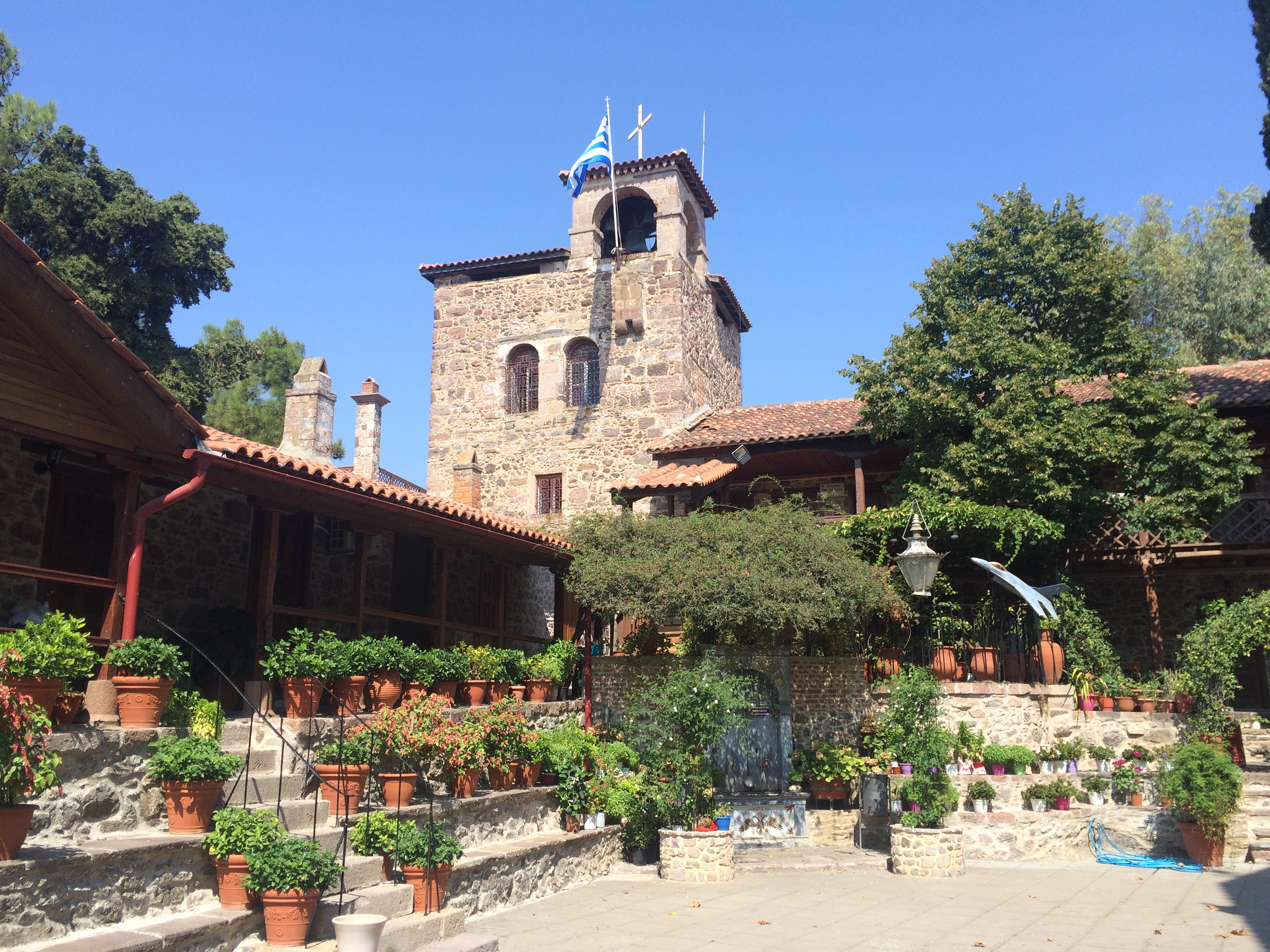

Religion
- Affiliation: Greek Orthodox
- Province: Lesbos Prefecture
- Region: North Aegean administrative region
- Rite: Greek Rite
- Festival: November 8
- Ecclesiastical or organisational status: Church and Pilgrimage site
- Patron: Michael and Archangels

Location
- Location: Mantamados, Lesvos
- Country: Greece
- Interactive map of Holy Church of the Archangels (Taxiarchon)

Architecture
- Type: Three-aisled basilica
- Style: 19th-century Post-Byzantine & Neoclassical Revival
- Established: 900 AD
- Completed: 900 -1000 (1st building); 1700s (2nd building); 1879 (current building)

Notable holdings
- Icon / Artwork: Archangel Michael of Mantamados (c. 900-1000)

Holy Church of the Archangels (Taxiarchon) is a significant Greek Orthodox pilgrimage site on the island of Lesbos in the town of Mantamados. The site is similar to other Lesbian pilgrimage sites such as the Church of the Dormition of the Theotokos in Agiasos and Agios Raphael Monastery. Nel Lines named a ship after the sacred monastery named Taxiarchis. The word Taxiarchis means "commander" or "archangel", and the church was named as such because it houses a sacred shrine dedicated to the Archangel Michael.

The shrine is believed to be over 1,000 years old, created by the blood sacrifice of 17 slain monks during the Byzantine period. The site is located 36 km or 22 miles from Mytilene. The monastery transitioned to a non-monastic pilgrimage church sometime in the 19th century. The modern church functions as a parish shrine. One of the major festivals of the church is on November 8, which is Saint Michael's Feast Day or Feast of the Archangels (Synaxis of the Archangels). The church is similar to the pilgrimage site known as Sanctuary of Monte Sant'Angelo, which is the oldest shrine in Western Europe dedicated to the Archangel Michael.

The Holy Church of the Archangels (Taxiarchon) was built in 1879 and follows the traditional Aegean island post-Byzantine church architecture of the late Ottoman era. The building was designed to withstand piracy, and the grounds feature perimeter stone fortified walls. The monastic complex has a three-aisled basilica and a timber roof design. The grounds feature a prominent bell tower and a central courtyard. The site features a special framework created in 1766 to house the sacred relic of Saint Michael. A bull is slaughtered every year during the anniversary of the church's inauguration. The church also houses the iron shoes of the Archangel, known as the "siderenia papoutsia". According to local legend, Archangel Michael wears the shoes and travels around the island at night to heal the sick, guide travelers, and help those in danger. Pilgrims also leave shoes as votive offerings.

== History ==
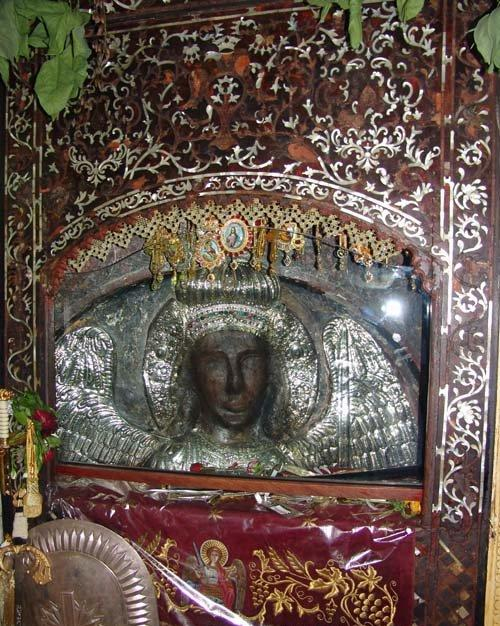
Archangel Michael painted by Gabriel with blood. ce. 900-1000 AD

Local oral tradition places the monastery in the 10th century, but the earliest verified church records date back to 1661. The local church contains a sacred relic named the Archangel Michael of Mantamados. Local legend claims the relic was painted using the blood of massacred local monks during a saracen pirate attack, which was led by Sirhan. One spring in a year between 900 and 1000 AD, there were 18 monks living in a monastery dedicated to the Archangel Michael. The pirates traveled 5 to 10 kilometers, about 3 to 6 miles, up the hill to the monastery. With their axes and swords, they slaughtered 17 monks.

A young monk named Gabriel survived the attack by hiding on the roof, but the pirates found him and advanced towards him, when suddenly a powerful figure appeared with a sword of fire. The pirates were in complete shock and fear; they ran away screaming, leaving behind their plunder and weapons. Gabriel witnessed the great miracle and lost consciousness. When Gabriel woke up, he was overwhelmed with grief when he climbed down into the church because every monk was dead. He walked to the iconostasis in tears, begging the Archangel Michael for guidance; another apparition of Michael appeared; the monk, in awe, screaming his name, wanted to capture the moment. The monk noticed blood everywhere, even on his hands, and had a vision. With the blood of the 17 slain monks, he created the sacred icon of the Archangel Michael of Mantamados, capturing their blood sacrifice with his vision of Saint Michael. Gabriel reveled in awe at how much his creation resembled the apparition of the Archangel.

A monastery dedicated to the Archangel has existed there since the event and is one of the most significant pilgrimage sites on the island of Lesvos. The church is similar to Sanctuary of Monte Sant'Angelo, which is the oldest shrine in Western Europe dedicated to the Archangel Michael. The location also has been a pilgrimage site since the early Middle Ages and features stories about the apparition of Archangel Michael. The Holy Church of the Archangels (Taxiarchon) is located 36 km or 22 miles from Mytilene. The site was a male monastery, and the first church documents date back to 1661. The monastery transitioned to a non-monastic pilgrimage church sometime in the 19th century. The current church functions as a parish shrine. One of the major festivals of the church is on November 8.

== Architectural Design ==
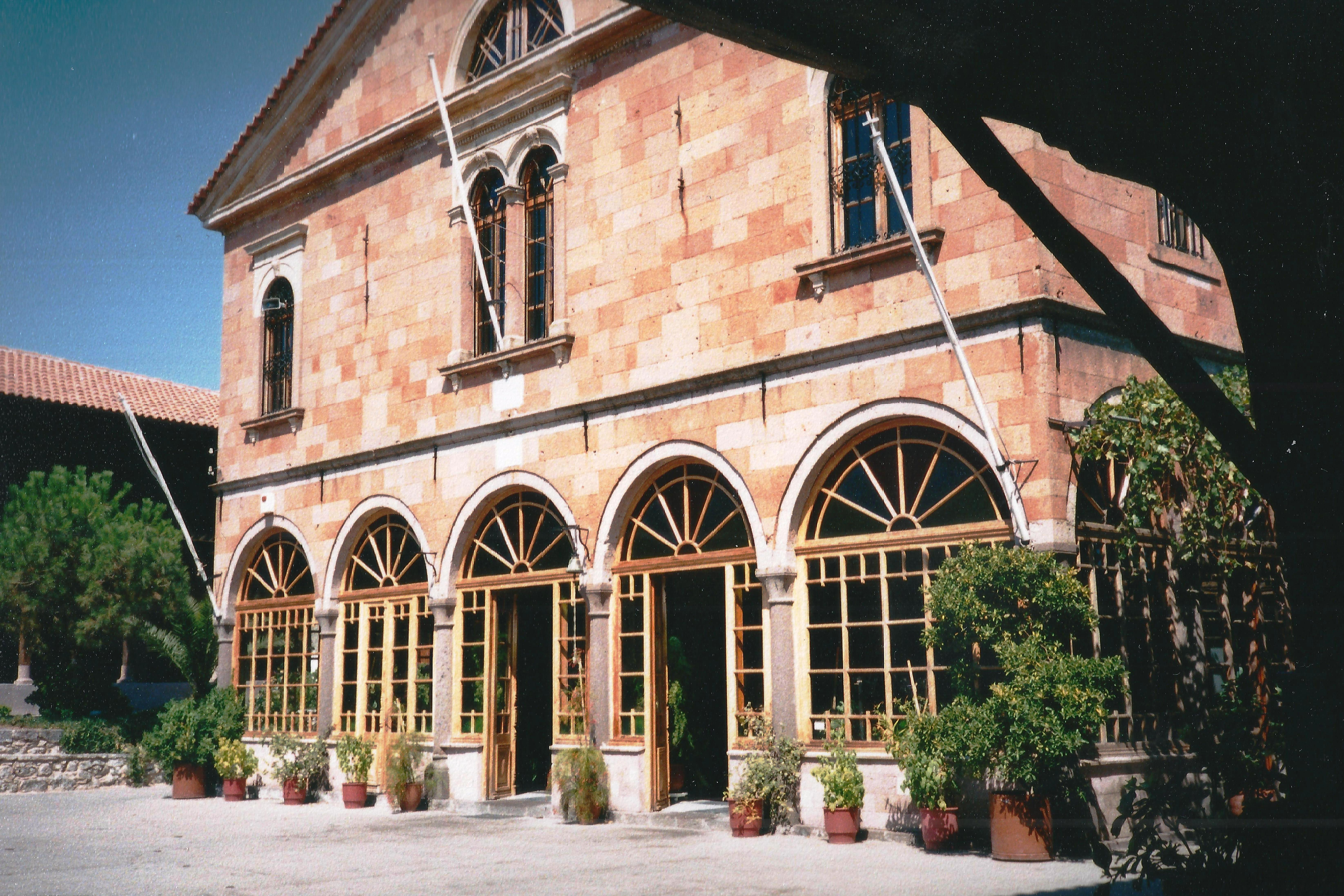
Church entrance

Oral tradition places the monastic complex and original small church as early as 900–1000 AD. Records document a small church at the pilgrimage site in 1661. The original building was replaced by a larger one in the 1700s. The final Post-Byzantine & Neoclassical Revival basilica The Holy Church of the Archangels (Taxiarchon) was erected in 1879. The monastic complex adheres to traditional Aegean island post-Byzantine church architecture of the late Ottoman era. The building is a three-aisled basilica inside stone fortified walls designed to withstand piracy. The church features a timber roof design, a bell tower, and a central courtyard.

The interior of the building features a sculpted triumphant marble iconostasis and massive ancient Greek-style Corinthian columns consistent with baroque-inspired neoclassical architecture. The ceiling features both groin and barrel vaults. The iconostasis features early Greek–Italian Byzantine-influenced sculptures.The painted ceiling features arches spanning across the central ceiling, dividing the overhead space into square structural sections called bays. The artwork was completed in the late 1800s and early 1900s. Adjoining the courtyard, the complex features an open arcaded portico that functions as an exonarthex (outer narthex).

The Church of the Dormition of the Theotokos built in 1815 also features a three-aisled basilica and is built in the Aegean 19th-century Post-Byzantine & Neoclassical revival style during the Ottoman period. Both churches feature similar characteristics. Early Greek Italian churches featured similar architecture and characteristics; the Mausoleum of Constantina in Rome features ancient Greek Corinthian columns along with Santa Maria degli Angeli e dei Martiri and Santo Spirito, Florence

== Bibliography ==
- Dissos, Efstratios (2019). The Chronicle and the Miracles of the Taxiarch in Mantamados. Mytilini, Greece: Efstratios Dissos Publishing. ISBN 9788834136485.
- Kleiner, Fred S. (2009). Gardner's Art through the Ages: A Concise Global History, Second Edition. Boston, MA: Wadsworth Cengage Learning. ISBN 978-0495503460.
