= EUO =

EUO may refer to:

- Ege University Observatory, astronomical observatory in Turkey
- Everest University Online, division of the for-profit Everest University
- EUobserver, European online newspaper launched in 2000
- Europium(II) oxide, (EuO), chemical compound of europium and oxygen
