= Karini =

Karini Καρήνη
- Settlement
- Location within Greece
- Coordinates: 39°07′N 26°23′E
- Country: Greece
- Administrative region: North Aegean
- Regional unit: Lesbos
- Municipality: Mytilene
- Municipal unit: Agiasos
- Community: Agiasos

Population (2021)
  - Total: 0
- Time zone: UTC+2 (EET)
  - Summer (DST): UTC+3 (EEST)

Karini (Greek: Καρήνη) is a village administratively belonging to the Municipal Unit of Mytilene on the island of Lesbos, North Aegean, Greece. According to the 2021 census, it has no permanent population.

== Geography ==
Karini is situated at an elevation of 80 meters and is positioned along the main road from Mytilene to Agiasos, approximately 1 kilometer west from the edge of the Ippios plain. It occupies an exceptionally fertile narrow valley and benefits from a freshwater spring.

== Archaeology ==
Koldeway observed the remnants of an ancient building complex which he identified as a villa. Within this complex, he discovered a well-fired buff vessel containing around 100 bronze coins, several depicting the head of Apollo and a four-stringed lyre on the reverse side. Some coins bore the inscription "MYTI" along with monograms on both sides. This hoard was dated to the 3rd century BC or possibly a bit later.

In close proximity, Kontis documented remnants of quarries, with the majority displaying signs of ancient extraction activity, and Taxis reported the presence of an ancient cistern.

== Population ==
1991	2001	2011	2021
13	18	6	0
