= Green Mansion =

Green Mansion or Green Mansion House may refer to:

== Places ==
- Green Mansion (Newark, Delaware), NRHP-listed
- Green Mansion House (Kenton, Delaware), listed on the NRHP in Kent County, Delaware
- Green Mansion (İzmir) a historical building in İzmir.

== Other ==
- Green Mansion (film), a 2008 Hong Kong film

== See also ==
- Green Mansions: A Romance of the Tropical Forest, a romance book
- Green Mansions (film), film with Audrey Hepburn
