= 2005 Rally of Turkey =

7th round of the 2005 World Rally Championship

2005 Rally of Turkey 6th Rally of Turkey
Round 7 of the 2005 World Rally Championship season
← Previous event	Next event →
- Host country: Turkey
- Rally base: Kemer
- Dates run: June 2, 2005 – June 5, 2005
- Stages: 18 (351.03 km; 218.12 miles)
- Stage surface: Gravel
- Overall distance: 1,183.54 km (735.42 miles)

Statistics
- Crews: 77 at start, 54 at finish

Overall results
- Overall winner: (France) Sébastien Loeb (Monaco) Daniel Elena (France) Citroën Total WRT; Citroën Xsara WRC

The 2005 Rally of Turkey (formally the 6th Rally of Turkey) was the seventh round of the 2005 World Rally Championship. The rally was held over four days between 2 June and 5 June 2005, and was won by Citroën's Sébastien Loeb, his 15th win in the World Rally Championship and a fourth consecutive win, equaling the record set by Timo Salonen in 1985.

== Background ==
=== Entry list ===
No.	Driver	Co-Driver	Entrant	Car	Tyre
World Rally Championship manufacturer entries
1	(France) Sébastien Loeb	(Monaco) Daniel Elena	(France) Citroën Total WRT	Citroën Xsara WRC	MI
2	(Spain) Carlos Sainz	(Spain) Marc Martí	(France) Citroën Total WRT	Citroën Xsara WRC	MI
3	(Finland) Toni Gardemeister	(Finland) Jakke Honkanen	(United Kingdom) BP Ford World Rally Team	Ford Focus RS WRC '04	MI
4	(Czech Republic) Roman Kresta	(Czech Republic) Jan Možný	(United Kingdom) BP Ford World Rally Team	Ford Focus RS WRC '04	MI
5	(Norway) Petter Solberg	(United Kingdom) Phil Mills	(Japan) Subaru World Rally Team	Subaru Impreza S11 WRC '05	P
6	(Australia) Chris Atkinson	(Australia) Glenn Macneall	(Japan) Subaru World Rally Team	Subaru Impreza S11 WRC '05	P
7	(Finland) Marcus Grönholm	(Finland) Timo Rautiainen	(France) Marlboro Peugeot Total	Peugeot 307 WRC	P
8	(Estonia) Markko Märtin	(United Kingdom) Michael Park	(France) Marlboro Peugeot Total	Peugeot 307 WRC	P
9	(Finland) Harri Rovanperä	(Finland) Risto Pietiläinen	(Japan) Mitsubishi Motors	Mitsubishi Lancer WRC 05	P
10	(Italy) Gianluigi Galli	(Italy) Guido D'Amore	(Japan) Mitsubishi Motors	Mitsubishi Lancer WRC 05	P
11	(Germany) Armin Schwarz	(Germany) Klaus Wicha	(Czech Republic) Škoda Motorsport	Škoda Fabia WRC	MI
12	(Finland) Janne Tuohino	(Finland) Mikko Markkula	(Czech Republic) Škoda Motorsport	Škoda Fabia WRC	MI
World Rally Championship entries
14	(Germany) Antony Warmbold	(United Kingdom) Michael Orr	(United Kingdom) BP Ford World Rally Team	Ford Focus RS WRC '04	MI
15	(Norway) Henning Solberg	(Norway) Cato Menkerud	(United Kingdom) BP Ford World Rally Team	Ford Focus RS WRC '04	MI
16	(Sweden) Daniel Carlsson	(Sweden) Mattias Andersson	(Sweden) Rally Team Olsbergs	Subaru Impreza S10 WRC '04	P
17	(Turkey) Serkan Yazici	(Turkey) Can Okan	(Turkey) Serkan Yazici	Hyundai Accent WRC3	P
18	(Greece) Armodios Vovos	(Greece) Loris Meletopoulos	(Greece) Armodios Vovos	Subaru Impreza S10 WRC '04	P
19	(Sweden) Tobias Johansson	(Finland) Kaj Lindström	(Sweden) Rally Team Olsbergs	Subaru Impreza S10 WRC '04	P
61	(Turkey) Hakan Dinç	(Turkey) Bulent Korzay	(Turkey) Hakan Dinç	Škoda Octavia WRC Evo3	—N/a
62	(Turkey) Mehmet Besler	(Turkey) Afsin Baydar	(Turkey) Mehmet Besler	Ford Focus WRC '01	—N/a
64	(Turkey) Nejat Avci	(Turkey) Batuhan Memisyazici	(Turkey) Nejat Avci	Ford Focus WRC '01	—N/a
65	(United Kingdom) Nigel Heath	(United Kingdom) Steve Lancaster	(United Kingdom) Nigel Heath	Subaru Impreza S7 WRC '01	—N/a
66	(Turkey) Ali Deveci	(Turkey) Mehmet Yazici	(Turkey) Ali Deveci	Hyundai Accent WRC	—N/a
68	(Turkey) Murat Akdilek	(Turkey) Ozden Yilmaz	(Turkey) Hyundai Assan Motorsports	Hyundai Accent WRC	—N/a
PWRC entries
31	(Japan) Toshihiro Arai	(New Zealand) Tony Sircombe	(United Kingdom) Subaru Team Arai	Subaru Impreza STI N11	P
32	(Spain) Xavier Pons	(Spain) Oriol Julià Pascual	(Spain) Xavier Pons	Mitsubishi Lancer Evo VIII	MI
33	(Qatar) Nasser Al-Attiyah	(United Kingdom) Chris Patterson	(Qatar) Nasser Al-Attiyah	Subaru Impreza STI N11 Spec C	—N/a
34	(Japan) Fumio Nutahara	(Japan) Satoshi Hayashi	(Japan) Advan-Piaa Rally Team	Mitsubishi Lancer Evo VIII	Y
35	(Malaysia) Karamjit Singh	(United Kingdom) John Bennie	Proton Pert Malaysia	Proton Pert Evo VII	—N/a
36	(Argentina) Marcos Ligato	(Argentina) Rubén García	Subaru Argentina Rally Team	Subaru Impreza STI N11	—N/a
37	(United Kingdom) Mark Higgins	(United Kingdom) Trevor Agnew	(United Kingdom) Mark Higgins	Subaru Impreza STI N11	P
38	(Italy) Fabio Frisiero	(Italy) Giovanni Agnese	(Italy) Fabio Frisiero	Subaru Impreza STI N11 Spec C	P
40	(Argentina) Gabriel Pozzo	(Argentina) Daniel Stillo	Subaru Argentina Rally Team	Subaru Impreza STI N11 Spec C	—N/a
41	(United Kingdom) Natalie Barratt	(United Kingdom) Carl Williamson	(Belgium) OMV World Rally Team	Mitsubishi Lancer Evo VIII	P
42	(Argentina) Federico Villagra	(Argentina) Javier Villagra	(Argentina) Federico Villagra	Mitsubishi Lancer Evo VIII	SS
43	(Italy) Angelo Medeghini	(Italy) Barbara Capoferri	(Italy) Angelo Medeghini	Mitsubishi Lancer Evo VIII	P
44	(Argentina) Sebastián Beltrán	(Argentina) Edgardo Galindo	Subaru Argentina Rally Team	Subaru Impreza STI N11 Spec C	—N/a
45	(Italy) Riccardo Errani	(Italy) Stefano Casadio	(Italy) Riccardo Errani	Mitsubishi Lancer Evo VIII	—N/a
48	(Chile) Luis Ignacio Rosselot	(Chile) Ricardo Rojas	(Chile) Luis Ignacio Rosselot	Mitsubishi Lancer Evo VIII	—N/a
49	(Oman) Hamed Al-Wahaibi	(United Kingdom) David Senior	Oman Arab World Rally Team	Subaru Impreza STI N11	—N/a
50	(Finland) Aki Teiskonen	(Finland) Miika Teiskonen	(Japan) Syms Rally Team	Subaru Impreza STI	—N/a
51	(France) Brice Tirabassi	(France) Mathieu Baumel	(France) Brice Tirabassi	Subaru Impreza STI N11 Spec C	—N/a

=== Itinerary ===
All dates and times are EEST (UTC+3).

Date	Time	No.	Stage name	Distance
1. leg — 150.74 km
2 June	19:00	SS1	Efes Pilsen 1	2.60 km
3 June	07:08	SS2	Phaselis 1	28.98 km
3 June	08:16	SS3	Arykanda 1	11.95 km
3 June	11:14	SS4	Perge 1	22.28 km
3 June	11:57	SS5	Myra 1	24.05 km
3 June	12:40	SS6	Arykanda 2	11.95 km
3 June	15:38	SS7	Perge 2	22.28 km
3 June	16:21	SS8	Myra 2	24.05 km
3 June	18:04	SS9	Efes Pilsen 2	2.60 km
2. leg — 150.49 km
4 June	07:33	SS10	Kemer 1	20.35 km
4 June	08:21	SS11	Silyon 1	29.58 km
4 June	11:04	SS12	Kemer 2	20.35 km
4 June	11:52	SS13	Silyon 2	29.58 km
4 June	15:00	SS14	Chimera 1	16.45 km
4 June	15:58	SS15	Phaselis 2	28.98 km
4 June	17:41	SS16	Efes Pilsen 3	5.20 km
3. leg — 49.80 km
5 June	10:03	SS17	Chimera 2	16.45 km
5 June	11:01	SS18	Olympos	33.35 km

== Results ==
=== Overall ===
Pos.	No.	Driver	Co-driver	Team	Car	Time	Difference	Points
1	1	(France) Sébastien Loeb	(Monaco) Daniel Elena	(France) Citroën Total WRT	Citroën Xsara WRC	4:21:48.0		10
2	5	(Norway) Petter Solberg	(United Kingdom) Phil Mills	(Japan) Subaru World Rally Team	Subaru Impreza S11 WRC '05	4:22:47.6	+59.6	8
3	7	(Finland) Marcus Grönholm	(Finland) Timo Rautiainen	(France) Marlboro Peugeot Total	Peugeot 307 WRC	4:23:03.3	+1:15.3	6
4	2	(Spain) Carlos Sainz	(Spain) Marc Martí	(France) Citroën Total WRT	Citroën Xsara WRC	4:26:05.9	+4:17.9	5
5	8	(Estonia) Markko Märtin	(United Kingdom) Michael Park	(France) Marlboro Peugeot Total	Peugeot 307 WRC	4:27:45.2	+5:57.2	4
6	3	(Finland) Toni Gardemeister	(Finland) Jakke Honkanen	(United Kingdom) BP Ford World Rally Team	Ford Focus RS WRC '04	4:29:55.3	+8:07.3	3
7	4	(Czech Republic) Roman Kresta	(Czech Republic) Jan Možný	(United Kingdom) BP Ford World Rally Team	Ford Focus RS WRC '04	4:30:36.3	+8:48.3	2
8	10	(Italy) Gianluigi Galli	(Italy) Guido D'Amore	(Japan) Mitsubishi Motors	Mitsubishi Lancer WRC 05	4:31:26.9	+9:38.9	1

=== World Rally Cars ===
==== Classification ====
Position		No.	Driver	Co-driver	Entrant	Car	Time	Difference	Points
Event	Class	No.	Driver	Co-driver	Entrant	Car	Time	Difference	Points
1	1	1	(France) Sébastien Loeb	(Monaco) Daniel Elena	(France) Citroën Total WRT	Citroën Xsara WRC	4:21:48.0		10
2	2	5	(Norway) Petter Solberg	(United Kingdom) Phil Mills	(Japan) Subaru World Rally Team	Subaru Impreza S11 WRC '05	4:22:47.6	+59.6	8
3	3	7	(Finland) Marcus Grönholm	(Finland) Timo Rautiainen	(France) Marlboro Peugeot Total	Peugeot 307 WRC	4:23:03.3	+1:15.3	6
4	4	2	(Spain) Carlos Sainz	(Spain) Marc Martí	(France) Citroën Total WRT	Citroën Xsara WRC	4:26:05.9	+4:17.9	5
5	5	8	(Estonia) Markko Märtin	(United Kingdom) Michael Park	(France) Marlboro Peugeot Total	Peugeot 307 WRC	4:27:45.2	+5:57.2	4
6	6	3	(Finland) Toni Gardemeister	(Finland) Jakke Honkanen	(United Kingdom) BP Ford World Rally Team	Ford Focus RS WRC '04	4:29:55.3	+8:07.3	3
7	7	4	(Czech Republic) Roman Kresta	(Czech Republic) Jan Možný	(United Kingdom) BP Ford World Rally Team	Ford Focus RS WRC '04	4:30:36.3	+8:48.3	2
8	8	10	(Italy) Gianluigi Galli	(Italy) Guido D'Amore	(Japan) Mitsubishi Motors	Mitsubishi Lancer WRC 05	4:31:26.9	+9:38.9	1
10	9	9	(Finland) Harri Rovanperä	(Finland) Risto Pietiläinen	(Japan) Mitsubishi Motors	Mitsubishi Lancer WRC 05	4:35:39.4	+13:51.4	0
13	10	12	(Finland) Janne Tuohino	(Finland) Mikko Markkula	(Czech Republic) Škoda Motorsport	Škoda Fabia WRC	4:42:23.0	+20:35.0	0
24	11	6	(Australia) Chris Atkinson	(Australia) Glenn Macneall	(Japan) Subaru World Rally Team	Subaru Impreza S11 WRC '05	4:56:55.3	+35:07.3	0
Retired SS6		11	(Germany) Armin Schwarz	(Germany) Klaus Wicha	(Czech Republic) Škoda Motorsport	Škoda Fabia WRC	Mechanical		0

==== Special stages ====
Day	Stage	Stage name	Length	Winner	Car	Time	Class leaders
1. leg (2 Jun)	SS1	Efes Pilsen 1	2.60 km	Stage cancelled			
1. leg (3 Jun)	SS2	Phaselis 1	28.98 km	(France) Sébastien Loeb	Citroën Xsara WRC	22:09.5	(France) Sébastien Loeb
1. leg (3 Jun)	SS3	Arykanda 1	11.95 km	(France) Sébastien Loeb	Citroën Xsara WRC	7:51.5	(France) Sébastien Loeb
1. leg (3 Jun)	SS4	Perge 1	22.28 km	(Italy) Gianluigi Galli	Mitsubishi Lancer WRC 05	16:12.3	(Italy) Gianluigi Galli
1. leg (3 Jun)	SS5	Myra 1	24.05 km	(France) Sébastien Loeb	Citroën Xsara WRC	20:37.4	(France) Sébastien Loeb
1. leg (3 Jun)	SS6	Arykanda 2	11.95 km	(France) Sébastien Loeb	Citroën Xsara WRC	7:47.3	(France) Sébastien Loeb
1. leg (3 Jun)	SS7	Perge 2	22.28 km	(France) Sébastien Loeb	Citroën Xsara WRC	16:39.1	(France) Sébastien Loeb
1. leg (3 Jun)	SS8	Myra 2	24.05 km	(France) Sébastien Loeb	Citroën Xsara WRC	20:17.3	(France) Sébastien Loeb
1. leg (3 Jun)	SS9	Efes Pilsen 2	2.60 km	(France) Sébastien Loeb	Citroën Xsara WRC	2:09.1	(France) Sébastien Loeb
2. leg (4 Jun)	SS10	Kemer 1	20.35 km	(Norway) Petter Solberg	Subaru Impreza S11 WRC '05	14:24.1	(France) Sébastien Loeb
2. leg (4 Jun)	SS11	Silyon 1	29.58 km	(France) Sébastien Loeb	Citroën Xsara WRC	21:41.1	(France) Sébastien Loeb
2. leg (4 Jun)	SS12	Kemer 2	20.35 km	(Norway) Petter Solberg	Subaru Impreza S11 WRC '05	14:11.7	(France) Sébastien Loeb
2. leg (4 Jun)	SS13	Silyon 2	29.58 km	(Norway) Petter Solberg	Subaru Impreza S11 WRC '05	21:22.6	(France) Sébastien Loeb
2. leg (4 Jun)	SS14	Chimera 1	16.45 km	(Italy) Gianluigi Galli	Mitsubishi Lancer WRC 05	11:59.1	(France) Sébastien Loeb
2. leg (4 Jun)	SS15	Phaselis 2	28.98 km	(France) Sébastien Loeb	Citroën Xsara WRC	22:15.0	(France) Sébastien Loeb
2. leg (4 Jun)	SS16	Efes Pilsen 3	5.20 km	(France) Sébastien Loeb	Citroën Xsara WRC	4:06.2	(France) Sébastien Loeb
3. leg (5 Jun)	SS17	Chimera 2	16.45 km	(Norway) Petter Solberg	Subaru Impreza S11 WRC '05	11:57.8	(France) Sébastien Loeb
3. leg (5 Jun)	SS18	Olympos	33.35 km	(Finland) Marcus Grönholm	Peugeot 307 WRC	24:58.0	(France) Sébastien Loeb

==== Championship standings ====
Pos.	Drivers' championships			Co-drivers' championships			Manufacturers' championships		
Pos.	Move	Driver	Points	Move	Co-driver	Points	Move	Manufacturer	Points
1		(France) Sébastien Loeb	55		(Monaco) Daniel Elena	55		(France) Marlboro Peugeot Total	72
2		(Norway) Petter Solberg	42		(United Kingdom) Phil Mills	42		(France) Citroën Total WRT	68
3		(Estonia) Markko Märtin	38		(United Kingdom) Michael Park	38		(United Kingdom) BP Ford World Rally Team	49
4	1	(Finland) Marcus Grönholm	32	1	(Finland) Timo Rautiainen	32		(Japan) Subaru World Rally Team	46
5	1	(Finland) Toni Gardemeister	31	1	(Finland) Jakke Honkanen	31		(Japan) Mitsubishi Motors	30

=== Production World Rally Championship ===
==== Classification ====
Position		No.	Driver	Co-driver	Entrant	Car	Time	Difference	Points
Event	Class	No.	Driver	Co-driver	Entrant	Car	Time	Difference	Points
14	1	31	(Japan) Toshihiro Arai	(New Zealand) Tony Sircombe	(United Kingdom) Subaru Team Arai	Subaru Impreza STI N11	4:45:30.6		10
15	2	36	(Argentina) Marcos Ligato	(Argentina) Rubén García	Subaru Argentina Rally Team	Subaru Impreza STI N11	4:45:32.2	+1.6	8
16	3	33	(Qatar) Nasser Al-Attiyah	(United Kingdom) Chris Patterson	(Qatar) Nasser Al-Attiyah	Subaru Impreza STI N11 Spec C	4:46:54.9	+1:24.3	6
17	4	32	(Spain) Xavier Pons	(Spain) Oriol Julià Pascual	(Spain) Xavier Pons	Mitsubishi Lancer Evo VIII	4:46:59.6	+1:29.0	5
20	5	49	(Oman) Hamed Al-Wahaibi	(United Kingdom) David Senior	Oman Arab World Rally Team	Subaru Impreza STI N11	4:53:23.3	+7:52.7	4
22	6	50	(Finland) Aki Teiskonen	(Finland) Miika Teiskonen	(Japan) Syms Rally Team	Subaru Impreza STI	4:54:00.7	+8:30.1	3
23	7	44	(Argentina) Sebastián Beltrán	(Argentina) Edgardo Galindo	Subaru Argentina Rally Team	Subaru Impreza STI N11 Spec C	4:55:50.1	+10:19.5	2
26	8	51	(France) Brice Tirabassi	(France) Mathieu Baumel	(France) Brice Tirabassi	Subaru Impreza STI N11 Spec C	4:57:35.5	+12:04.9	1
27	9	42	(Argentina) Federico Villagra	(Argentina) Javier Villagra	(Argentina) Federico Villagra	Mitsubishi Lancer Evo VIII	4:58:50.0	+13:19.4	0
32	10	43	(Italy) Angelo Medeghini	(Italy) Barbara Capoferri	(Italy) Angelo Medeghini	Mitsubishi Lancer Evo VIII	5:04:39.7	+19:09.1	0
41	11	45	(Italy) Riccardo Errani	(Italy) Stefano Casadio	(Italy) Riccardo Errani	Mitsubishi Lancer Evo VIII	5:20:06.1	+34:35.5	0
43	12	38	(Italy) Fabio Frisiero	(Italy) Giovanni Agnese	(Italy) Fabio Frisiero	Subaru Impreza STI N11 Spec C	5:28:13.3	+42:42.7	0
44	13	37	(United Kingdom) Mark Higgins	(United Kingdom) Trevor Agnew	(United Kingdom) Mark Higgins	Subaru Impreza STI N11	5:28:43.9	+43:13.3	0
45	14	34	(Japan) Fumio Nutahara	(Japan) Satoshi Hayashi	(Japan) Advan-Piaa Rally Team	Mitsubishi Lancer Evo VIII	5:30:55.8	+45:25.2	0
46	15	41	(United Kingdom) Natalie Barratt	(United Kingdom) Carl Williamson	(Belgium) OMV World Rally Team	Mitsubishi Lancer Evo VIII	5:31:39.1	+46:08.5	0
Retired SS17		48	(Chile) Luis Ignacio Rosselot	(Chile) Ricardo Rojas	(Chile) Luis Ignacio Rosselot	Mitsubishi Lancer Evo VIII	Accident		0
Retired SS14		35	(Malaysia) Karamjit Singh	(United Kingdom) John Bennie	Proton Pert Malaysia	Proton Pert Evo VII	Oil cooler		0
Retired SS11		40	(Argentina) Gabriel Pozzo	(Argentina) Daniel Stillo	Subaru Argentina Rally Team	Subaru Impreza STI N11 Spec C	Suspension		0

==== Special stages ====
Day	Stage	Stage name	Length	Winner	Car	Time	Class leaders
1. leg (2 Jun)	SS1	Efes Pilsen 1	2.60 km	Stage cancelled			
1. leg (3 Jun)	SS2	Phaselis 1	28.98 km	(Japan) Toshihiro Arai	Subaru Impreza STI N11	24:11.4	(Japan) Toshihiro Arai
1. leg (3 Jun)	SS3	Arykanda 1	11.95 km	(Spain) Xavier Pons	Mitsubishi Lancer Evo VIII	8:26.3	(Japan) Toshihiro Arai
1. leg (3 Jun)	SS4	Perge 1	22.28 km	(United Kingdom) Mark Higgins	Subaru Impreza STI N11	17:29.8	(Japan) Toshihiro Arai
1. leg (3 Jun)	SS5	Myra 1	24.05 km	(Spain) Xavier Pons	Mitsubishi Lancer Evo VIII	22:12.4	(Japan) Toshihiro Arai
1. leg (3 Jun)	SS6	Arykanda 2	11.95 km	(Spain) Xavier Pons	Mitsubishi Lancer Evo VIII	8:22.7	(Japan) Toshihiro Arai
1. leg (3 Jun)	SS7	Perge 2	22.28 km	(Japan) Toshihiro Arai	Subaru Impreza STI N11	18:03.8	(Japan) Toshihiro Arai
1. leg (3 Jun)	SS8	Myra 2	24.05 km	(Spain) Xavier Pons	Mitsubishi Lancer Evo VIII	22:01.0	(Argentina) Marcos Ligato
1. leg (3 Jun)	SS9	Efes Pilsen 2	2.60 km	(Spain) Xavier Pons	Mitsubishi Lancer Evo VIII	2:14.5	(Argentina) Marcos Ligato
2. leg (4 Jun)	SS10	Kemer 1	20.35 km	(United Kingdom) Mark Higgins	Subaru Impreza STI N11	15:38.6	(Argentina) Marcos Ligato
2. leg (4 Jun)	SS11	Silyon 1	29.58 km	(Japan) Toshihiro Arai	Subaru Impreza STI N11	23:27.6	(Argentina) Marcos Ligato
2. leg (4 Jun)	SS12	Kemer 2	20.35 km	(Japan) Fumio Nutahara	Mitsubishi Lancer Evo VIII	15:26.6	(Argentina) Marcos Ligato
2. leg (4 Jun)	SS13	Silyon 2	29.58 km	(Japan) Toshihiro Arai	Subaru Impreza STI N11	23:10.0	(Argentina) Marcos Ligato
2. leg (4 Jun)	SS14	Chimera 1	16.45 km	(Japan) Toshihiro Arai	Subaru Impreza STI N11	12:53.9	(Argentina) Marcos Ligato
2. leg (4 Jun)	SS15	Phaselis 2	28.98 km	(Spain) Xavier Pons	Mitsubishi Lancer Evo VIII	23:54.3	(Argentina) Marcos Ligato
2. leg (4 Jun)	SS16	Efes Pilsen 3	5.20 km	(Japan) Fumio Nutahara	Mitsubishi Lancer Evo VIII	4:21.2	(Argentina) Marcos Ligato
3. leg (5 Jun)	SS17	Chimera 2	16.45 km	(Japan) Toshihiro Arai	Subaru Impreza STI N11	12:51.9	(Argentina) Marcos Ligato
3. leg (5 Jun)	SS18	Olympos	33.35 km	(Japan) Toshihiro Arai	Subaru Impreza STI N11	26:34.4	(Japan) Toshihiro Arai

==== Championship standings ====
Pos.	Drivers' championships		
Pos.	Move	Driver	Points
1		(Japan) Toshihiro Arai	30
2		(Spain) Xavier Pons	20
3		(Argentina) Marcos Ligato	20
4	1	(Qatar) Nasser Al-Attiyah	15
5	1	(France) Brice Tirabassi	11
