= Ege University Observatory =

Ege University Observatory Ege Üniversitesi Gozlemevi
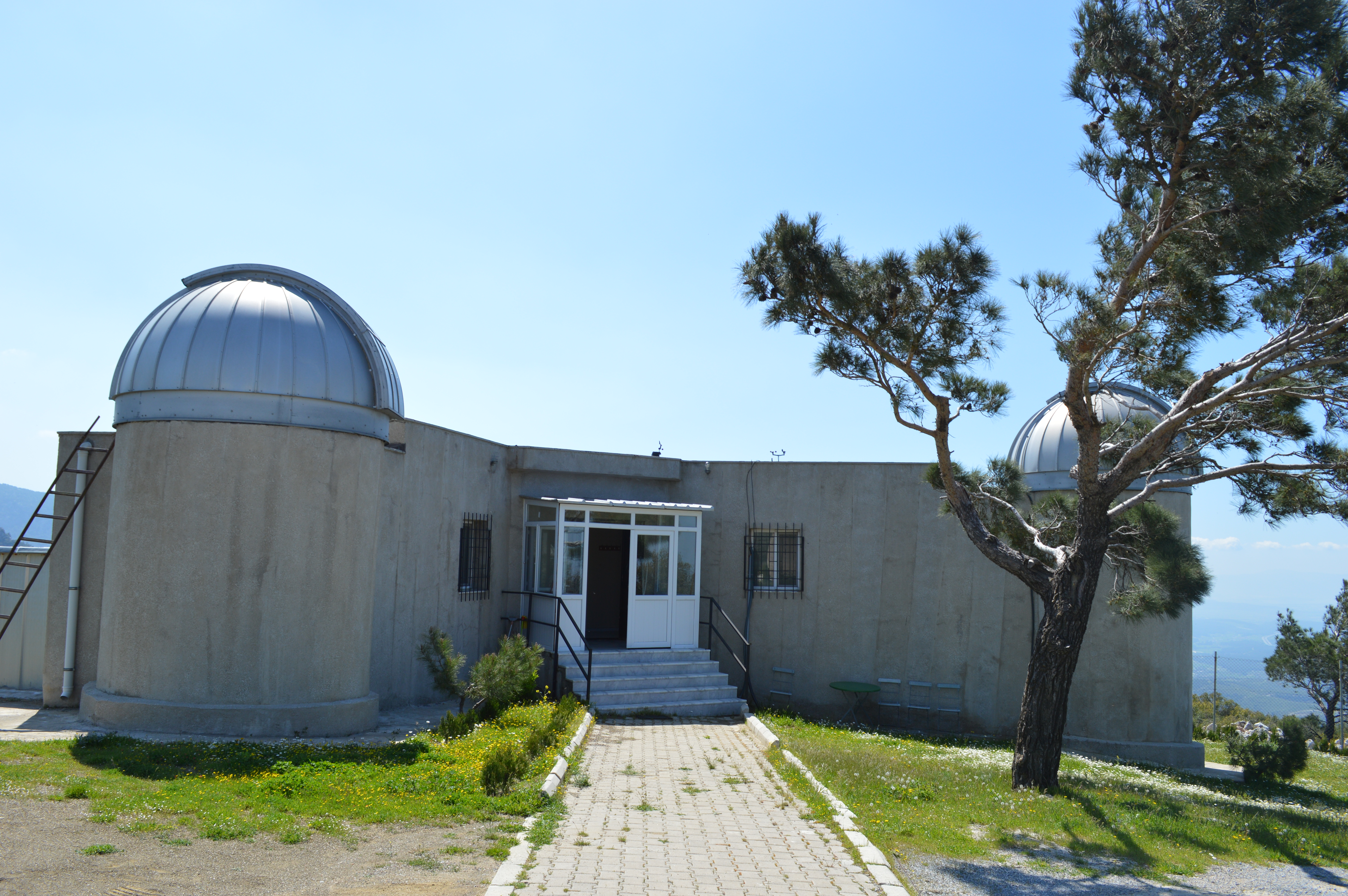
- Organization: Astronomy and Space Sciences Department; Faculty of Science; Ege University
- Location: Kurudağ, Kaynaklar Merkez, Buca, İzmir, Turkey
- Coordinates: 38°23′54″N 27°16′06″E
- Altitude: 800 m (2,600 ft)
- Established: June 22, 1965
- Website: gozlemevi.ege.edu.tr

Telescopes
- T15: 15 cm Unitron
- T6.4: 6.4 cm Zeiss Refracting telescope
- T6: 6 cm Russian Refracting telescope
- T30: 30 cm Meade Reflecting telescope
- T35: 35 cm Meade Reflecting telescope
- T40: 40 cm Meade Reflecting telescope
- A48: 48 cm Reflecting Cassegrain telescope
- Related media on Commons

The Ege University Observatory (Turkish: Ege Üniversitesi Gözlemevi, EUO) is a ground-based astronomical observatory operated by the Astronomy and Space Sciences Department at Ege University's Faculty of Science. Formally opened on June 22, 1965, it is located in Kurudağ at Buca district, 10 km (6.2 mi) east of İzmir in western Turkey. The telescope domes of the observatory are situated at an altitude of 800 m (2,600 ft) while the main building is erected at 632 m (2,073 ft).

The facility was officially renamed Ege University Observatory Application and Research Center (Turkish: Ege Üniversitesi Gözlemevi Uygulama ve Araştırma Merkezi) on August 12, 2009.

== History ==
Soon after the establishment of the Astronomy Department at Ege University in 1963, a project to establish an observatory was developed. Kurudağ was chosen as the location for the observatory, a site far from urban light pollution but close (17 km (11 mi)) to the university's campus.

The first instruments of the observatory were a 15-cm Unitron telescope, a Foucault pendulum and an Iris photometer. By 2013, night observations were becoming difficult due to glare from urban encroachment.

== Instruments ==
Currently, the observatory consists of following telescopes and instruments:

Telescopes

- 13 cm spectrograph (1967)
- 48 cm Cassegrain telescope (1968)
- 30 cm Meade telescope (1999)
- 35 cm Meade telescope (2004)
- 40 cm Meade telescope (2004)

Receivers-photometers

- High-speed three-channel photometer (48 cm)
- 2 pieces CCD cameras (35 and 40 cm telescopes)
- 2 pieces SSP-5 photometers (30 cm telescope)

A staff of 17 researchers and seven assistants work at the EUO.
