= Pınarbaşı, Bornova =

Pınarbaşı
- Neighborhood
- Coordinates: 38°25′46″N 27°16′28″E
- Country: Turkey
- Region: Aegean
- Province: İzmir
- District: Bornova
- Time zone: UTC+3 (TRT)
- Postal code: 35060
- Area code: 0232

Pınarbaşı is an area of Bornova district of İzmir Province in the Aegean Region of Turkey. It consists of four quarters.

There are some industrial plants located in Pınarbaşı, such as the BMC Turkey, one of the country's largest commercial vehicle manufacturer, Efes Pilsen and Tuborg breweries, Pınar Diary, etc. The Pınarbaşı Racing Circuit for go-kart and motorcycle racing, which is Turkey's second longest race course is situated also here.
