= Levantine mansions of İzmir =

Thirty stately residences in İzmir, Turkey, dating principally from the 19th century

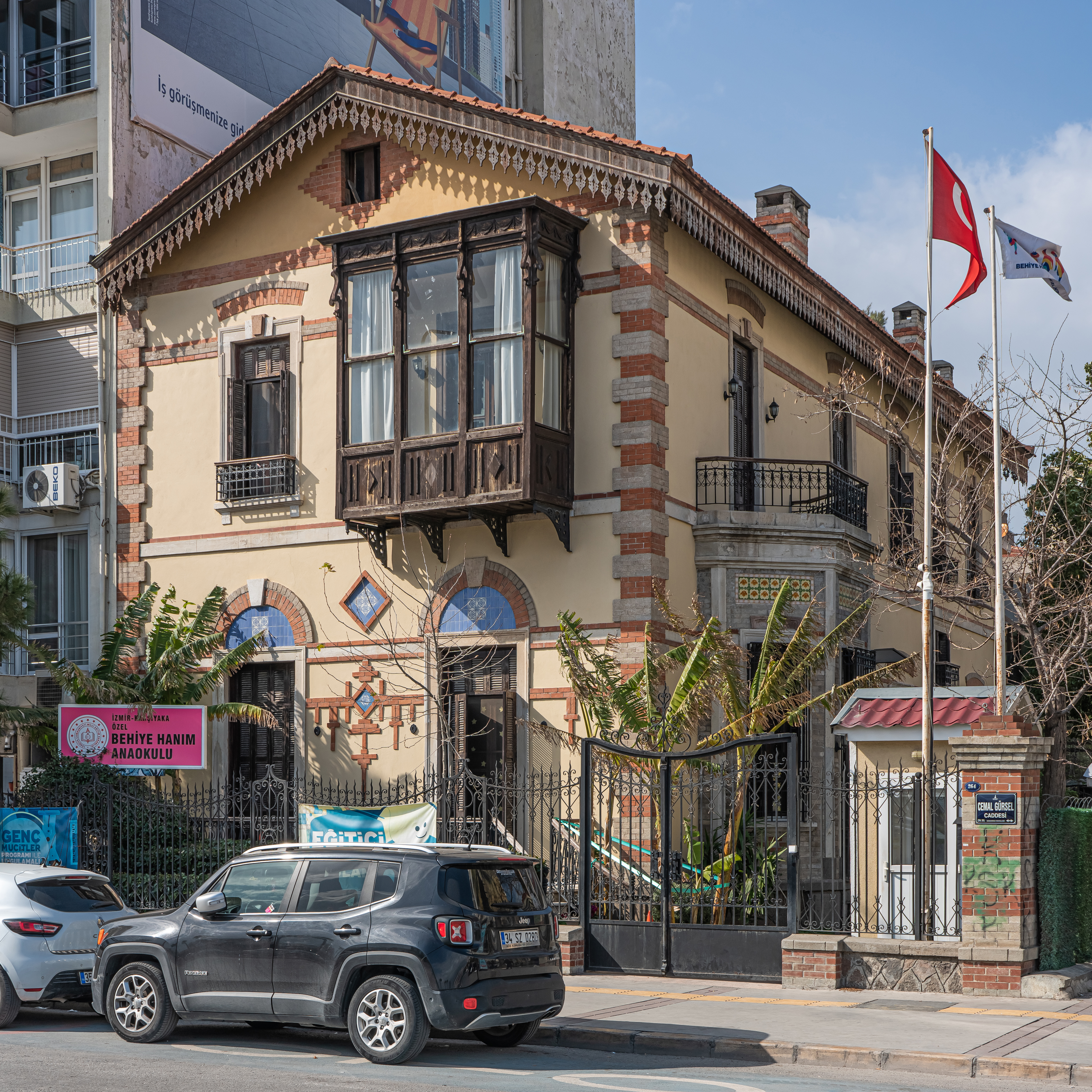
Karşıyaka, Löhner house

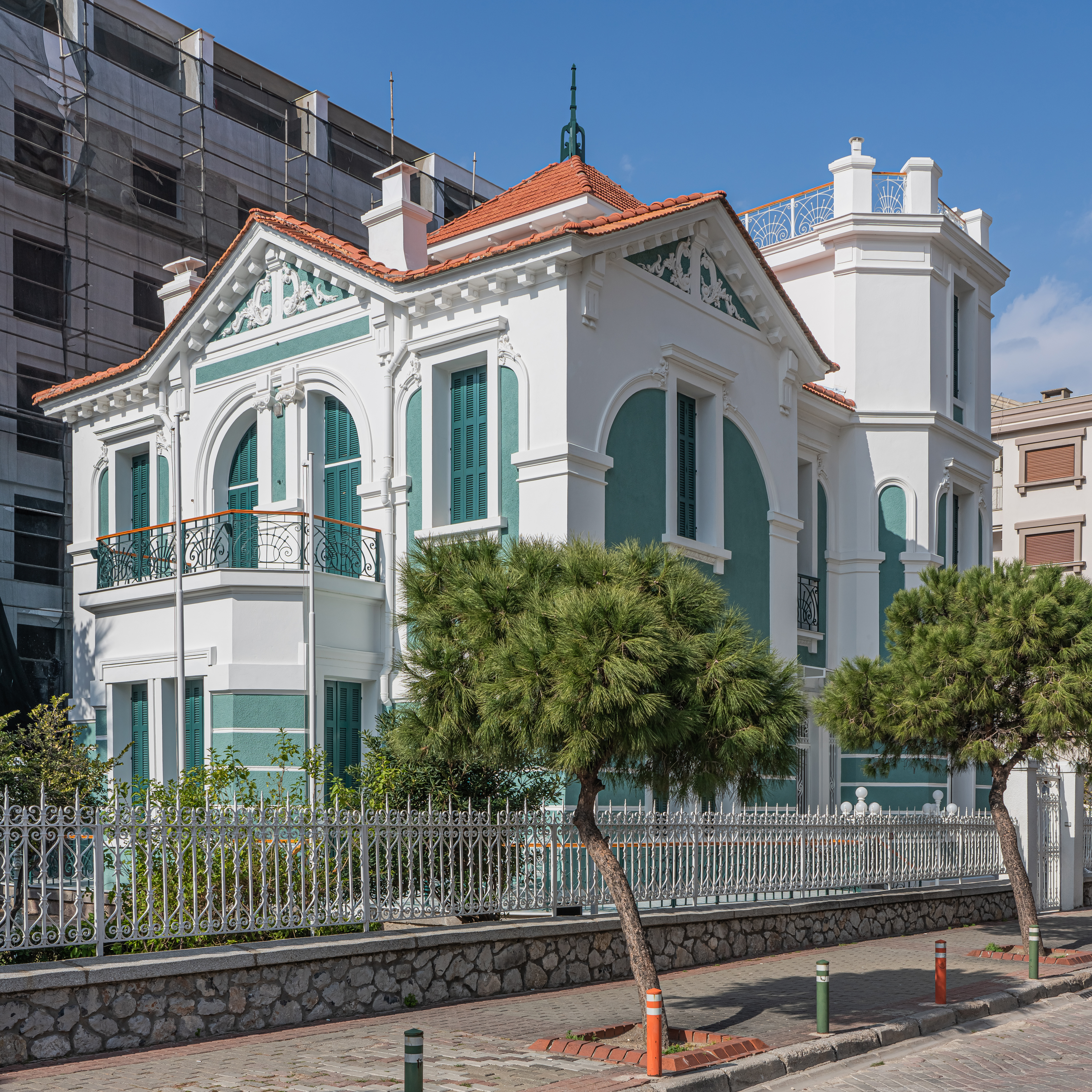
Karşıyaka, Alliotti house

Levantine mansions of İzmir (Turkish: İzmir Levanten köşkleri) refer to about thirty stately residences in İzmir, Turkey, dating principally from the 19th century and of which a significant number remain intact by being restored and continuing to be used and visited.

These residences differ from the traditional Ottoman mansions (konak) in the city by a number of features, as well as by their history. The families who owned them, the notable visitors they hosted in these houses, their testimonial destinies through the historic events of the city, make them an important part of İzmir's common heritage.

Levantine mansions were the favoured residential quarters for the city's richer classes of Western origins and are mostly situated in the modern-day metropolitan districts of Buca and Bornova, which are located slightly inland, or in the case of a few built more recently, in the coastal district of Karşıyaka.

== Origins ==
Although the term "Levant" was used more frequently, as an imprecise geographical notion, in reference to the region considered to be starting from the easternmost shores of the Mediterranean Sea, roughly covering present-day Syria, the historic community generally known under the denomination of the "Levantines" gained prominence principally in Turkey, Egypt and Lebanon. The term became current in English language as of the 16th century, along with the first merchant adventurers in the region and the Levant Company. It was applied primarily, but not exclusively, to people of Venetian, Genoese, French, or other Mediterranean origin who lived in Turkey and its former provinces since the Ottoman period. During the 19th century and early 20th century, Germans, Austrians, Russians, as well as people who were originally issued from the Christian or Jewish Ottoman minorities or even Turks, also followed suit, as long as they could introduce themselves to the tightly knit community. And although they usually shunned the term, it could be applied to settlers of British or American background as well, in function of their adoption of the elusive Levantine culture and lifestyle or integration into the local economy and social life. Typical Levantines acted at the top of the hierarchy of class of intermediaries governing the relations of the Ottoman Empire with the outside world; coming before, generally richer than, and individually collaborating and socially in competition with the locals, all on the background of the decline of the Empire, in a regime characterized by the capitulations and other privileges, foreign debt and outside intervention into politics.

Practically extinguished in the course of the political upheavals that shook Egypt and Lebanon in the 20th century, Levantine background and culture remains the most vivacious in Turkey, where it is considered one of the inherent elements of the overall social tissue. While many migrated back to Europe, many others continue to live in Istanbul (mostly in the districts of Beyoğlu and Nişantaşı) and İzmir (mostly in the districts of Bornova and Buca). They characteristically preserve intense international ties.

== Bornova ==
Bornova was favoured very early by European/Levantine merchants and foreign consuls who sought to flee the sometimes stagnantly hot summer weather in central İzmir to seek the cooler breeze of the slopes of the Mount Yamanlar on the immediate slopes of which the town of Bornova started out, at a distance of about five kilometers inland starting from the tip of the Gulf of İzmir.

This move by the rich and by foreign representatives was actually at the origin of the growth of the town in the 19th century, which used to be a small forestry village till then. The residences these new settlers built at that time, and most of which have come to our day and saw restoration, carry the prestigious names of former owners as Whittall, Maltass, Peterson, Giraud, Edwards, Belhomme, Pandespanian. There is a small Catholic Church named the "Church of Santa Maria", also dating from the 19th century, in the main square of Bornova, as well as an Anglican-Episcopalian chapel.

Levantine landmarks of Bornova	Explanations
Paterson Mansion	Currently, only very partially restored
Edwards House ("Murad House", "Fairy's House")	Restored for use as youth center by AE
Charlton Whittall House	Restored for use as AE Rectorate
Richard Whittall House	Awaiting restoration
Davy House
Wilkinson House	Restored in 2008 for use by AE
Former English Club House ("Well House")	Formerly part of Charlton Whittall Estate
Aliberti House
Balliani House
Bari House	Restored for use by AE
La Fontaine House	Restored for use by AE
Pierre Pagy House
Belhomme House	Used as municipal library
Pandespanian House
Steinbüchel House
Tristram House
St. Mary's Magdalene Anglican Church	Used once a month to serve the diminished Anglican congregation of Bornova
Bornova Anglican Cemetery	Still a used cemetery with binding criteria concerning burial
Bornova Catholic Church	Used as the Catholic Church and dominates the central square

The "Grand House" in Bornova was that of the Whittall family of merchants, who originated in Worcestershire, and of whom the first generation is attested to have come to Turkey in the first quarter of the 19th century. On a visit to İzmir, the sultan Abdülaziz stayed in their house on 20 April 1863, as well as the Prince of Wales (later King George V) in 1886 for several days. Their mansion serves today as the rectorate building of Ege University but is not closed to visitors who may drop by. Pandespanian mansion is managed by the same university as a restaurant-café, while the more discreet residences of Steinbuchel and Giraud played important roles in Turkey's power spheres. The day after the re-capture of İzmir by the Turkish army, Mustafa Kemal Pasha stayed in the Steinbuchel mansion, owned in 1922 by the English Wood family. A descendant of the Giraud family, Caroline Giraud Koç is the spouse of Mustafa Koç, the president of Koç Holding which is one of the largest family-owned industrial conglomerates in the world.

There are several other 19th-century houses of note, such as the Paggy, Charnaud, Kanalaki, Barry and Maltass houses and the Well house. Maltass house is the residence of the mayor of İzmir, Aziz Kocaoğlu. A special mention should be made for the Paterson Mansion (built in 1859), half-restored and the other half in decay, and which commands a large park in the heart of Bornova.

== Buca ==
Buca, situated slightly inland like Bornova, on the higher ground that commands the southern shores of the tip of the Gulf of İzmir, started to develop as of the end of the 17th century when the French consulate in İzmir moved there following the 1676 plague and the 1688 earthquake that seriously shook İzmir's core as an international trade center. Its rich Levantine residents who acquired the surrounding vineyards typically had Latin backgrounds, as opposed to those who originally came from Britain and who preferred Bornova. But in the case both of Bornova and of Buca, the concentration in terms of respective backgrounds was far from having an exclusive nature.

The most famous and imposing 19th-century residence in Buca is that of the David Forbes the younger, of MacAndrews and Forbes, Licorice manufacturers fame. Situated on the top of a hill, the mansion has an impressive appearance and view and is being very slowly restored. Buca municipality plans to coincide the restoration with the development of a vast park comprising seven artificial lakes in order to thematize the whole quarter comprising a dozen 19th-century residences. A persisting rumor attributes the unusual curve traced in Buca by the İzmir-Aydın railway, completed in 1866 and crossing right in front of mansions, to the influence of the Forbes family, who would have wanted it closer to their residence for easier rides. But that accomplishment is disputed by the Rees and Baltazzi families who also left magnificent residences to Buca and who claim the curve to be of their own making. The Baltazzis are no other than the maternal family of Baroness Maria Vetsera, of Mayerling Incident fame.

== Karşıyaka ==
Levantine landmarks of Karşıyaka	Explanations
Löhner House	Restored in 2003 by the municipality
Van Der Zee House	Restored for use as a social venue
Penetti House
Alliotti House	Restored by Yaşar Group of Companies
St. Helen Catholic Church	In use as Catholic Church
Club Petrococchino	Still a cosmopolitan café near the pier

The three most important Levantine landmarks still existing in Karşıyaka are the Alliotti, Van Der Zee and Löhner mansions. The first was built by a prominent family of Italian origins in 1914 and was exchanged in the 1920s, when the family was moving to the then Italian island of Rhodes, with the property there belonging to Durmuş Yaşar, the founder of Yaşar Holding and a Dodecanese Turk, who was moving into İzmir from that island. The mansion is known today under Durmuş Yaşar's name and serves as a cultural center. The two others are recently restored, and the first floor of the Van Der Zee mansion has been put by the Municipality of Karşıyaka to the service of the public in the form of a café (Eski Ev Café).

== Sources ==
- Onur İnal, Koç University. "The reflection of the Levantine culture on the architectural identity of Izmir" (PDF). European Association for Urban History, Stockholm.
