= Turkish Formula Three Championship =

Single-Seater Racing Championship

- Category: Single seaters
- Country: Turkey
- Inaugural season: 1994

The Turkish Formula Three Championship is an international motor racing series that takes place primarily in Turkey. It is a junior-level feeder formula that uses small single seater Formula Three chassis. The races are held in İzmit Körfez Circuit, Kocaeli Province and Pınarbaşı Racing Circuit, İzmir.

== History ==
The first Formula Three championship in Turkey was held in 1994 following importation of F3 cars end of 1993 sponsored by cooking oil refinery Olin and cigarette brand Marlboro. At the first edition drivers Mahir Bayındır, İbrahim Levent, Cem Hakko, Hakan Dinç, Ali Başakıncı, Ertan Nacaroğlu, Mert Dura and Mümtaz Tahincioğlu, the future president of the Turkish Motorsport Federation, took part.

In following years, the number of cars increased. Drivers such as İlham Dökümcü, Jason Tahincioğlu, Uğur Işık, Yalın Kılıç, Emre Ergör and Mehmet Kasap joined the championship. While in the end of the 1990s more than ten cars were racing, the number of participants dropped to four due to economic crisis in the country. However, the championship regained its former extent in 2002 and 2003 when more drivers and sponsors joined. In 2003, Turkey's first ever female F3-pilot Selin Yardımcı took part in the series.

== Specifications ==
The F3-cars used in Turkey are powered by 4-cylinder naturally aspirated spec engines of 173 hp (129 kW) in average with a displacement of 2,000 cc (2.0 L) and a weight of 450kg. The initial cars imported by Olin and Marlboro based on Fiat engines, which exist still in most of the cars. The F3 cars imported in 2001 for G-Force Team have Renault engines.

The F3 car can be accelerated from 0–100 km/h (0–62 mph) in less than 3 seconds with a five-speed manual paddle shift gearbox driven by an experienced pilot.

The speed record for a Formula Three car in Turkey was set at 208 km/h (129 mph) by Mümtaz Tahincioğlu at İzmit Körfez Circuit. These cars have the potential to reach a speed of 250 km/h (160 mph). The lack of a straight sufficient length at circuits in Turkey does not allow higher speeds.

== Teams ==
In the mid 2000s, four teams competed in the Turkish championship. These were G-Force, Team Active, Ar Racing and Beste Motorsports.
