= Ülkü Park =

Motor sports race track in İzmir, Turkey

- Location: Bornova, İzmir, Turkey
- Coordinates: 38°26′2″N 27°16′18″E
- Opened: 1997
- Former names: Pınarbaşı Racing Circuit
- Major events: Formula Three; Touring Car; Motorcycle Grand Prix
- Length: 2.186 km (1.358 mi)

Ülkü Park, also known as the Pınarbaşı Racing Circuit or İzmir Ülkü Racing Circuit, is a motor sports race track in the Pınarbaşı neighborhood of Bornova district in İzmir, Turkey. It was inaugurated in 1997.

Ülkü Park stretches over an area of 245 acres (99 ha). With its 2.186 km (1.358 mi) length, it is Turkey's second longest race track following Istanbul Park.

In addition to the asphalt course, which hosts auto and motorcycle and karting races, there are two more small-sized go-kart courses and a paintball playing field inside the main track. The facility includes open and covered stands, a 28-shop paddock, an exhibition area with halls in different sizes, a VIP lounge, training halls and a cafeteria.

== Major motorsports events ==
The venue host regularly:

- Turkish Formula Three Championship
- Turkish Touring Car Championship
- Turkish Motorcycle Grand Prix
- Turkish Karting Championship
