= Paterson Mansion =

- Paterson Köşkü
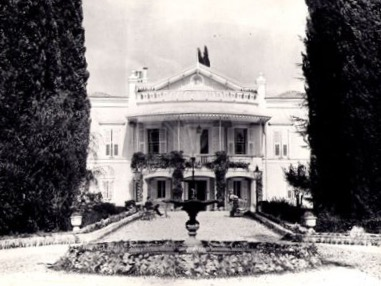
- Interactive map of the Paterson Mansion area

General information
- Location: Bornova, İzmir, Turkey
- Coordinates: 38°27′51.5″N 27°12′48.3″E
- Construction started: 1859
- Completed: 1860s
- Renovated: 2016-2024
- Owner: Ministry of Culture and Tourism

Technical details
- Floor count: 2
- Grounds: 25,400 m^{2} (273,000 sq ft)

Paterson Mansion (Turkish: Paterson Köşkü) is a mansion in İzmir, Turkey. It's the largest Levantine mansion in the city.

== History ==
Paterson Mansion started to be built in 1859 by British merchant John Paterson. Many of the construction materials of the mansion were brought from Continental Europe and England. The facade of the building was changed seven times by the original owners. In 1963, the Paterson family left the mansion when they immigrated to England.

Following its owners departure, the mansion was used as an office by NATO personnel for five years. In 1973, some parts of the building were demolished when it was turned into a carpet factory. In 1978, an expropriation decision was made for the building by the local government. The main entrance section of the building was damaged in a fire in 1986.

Restoration works were initiated by the Ministry of Culture and Tourism in 1991. In 2017, the Ministry leased the property to İzmir Metropolitan Municipality for forty-nine years. Another restoration, which started in June 2016, is planned to be completed in 2024.

== Architecture ==
Paterson Mansion has two floors and thirty-eight rooms. It is located on a land of 25,400 m^{2} (273,000 sq ft).

== See also ==
- Levantine mansions of İzmir
