= Hakan Dinç =

Turkish racing driver

Hakan Dinç (born 1963, İstanbul) is a Turkish racing driver. He made his first amateur race Talbot Samba in 1986, and won the Ankara Hittite Rally in 1987. Beyond this, throughout his rally career, he competed in vehicles such as the Renault 11 Turbo Group A, Renault 11 Flash Group N, Opel Corsa GSi, Opel Astra GSi, Ford Escort RS Cosworth Group A, Opel Astra Kit car F2, Subaru Impreza WRX Group N and Fiat Punto Kit car F3.

Dinç trained with the Jim Russell Racing Driver School in 1993, and earned an instructor's license. One year after, he established the Safari Racing School. In 1994, Dinç competed in the fledgling Turkish Formula Three Championship.

Dinç won the Group N class of the Turkish Rally Championship in 2004, a year in which he also made his debut in the World Rally Championship, when he entered the Rally of Turkey; in this event, he won the Group N4 category. The following year, he switched to a Škoda Octavia WRC for both the Turkish Rally Championship and the Rally of Turkey, but mechanical issues forced him out of the latter event on the fourth stage. In 2006, Dinç competed in the Rally of Turkey for the third time, which was part of the World Rally Championship, in a Group N Subaru Impreza WRX STi; he finished fourth in class. In 2007, he transferred to Ford Rally Sport Turkey Team, driving a Ford Focus RS WRC.
