= Church of the Dormition of the Theotokos (Agiasos) =

Church in Agiasos, Greece

Coordinates: 39.0818°N 26.3723°E

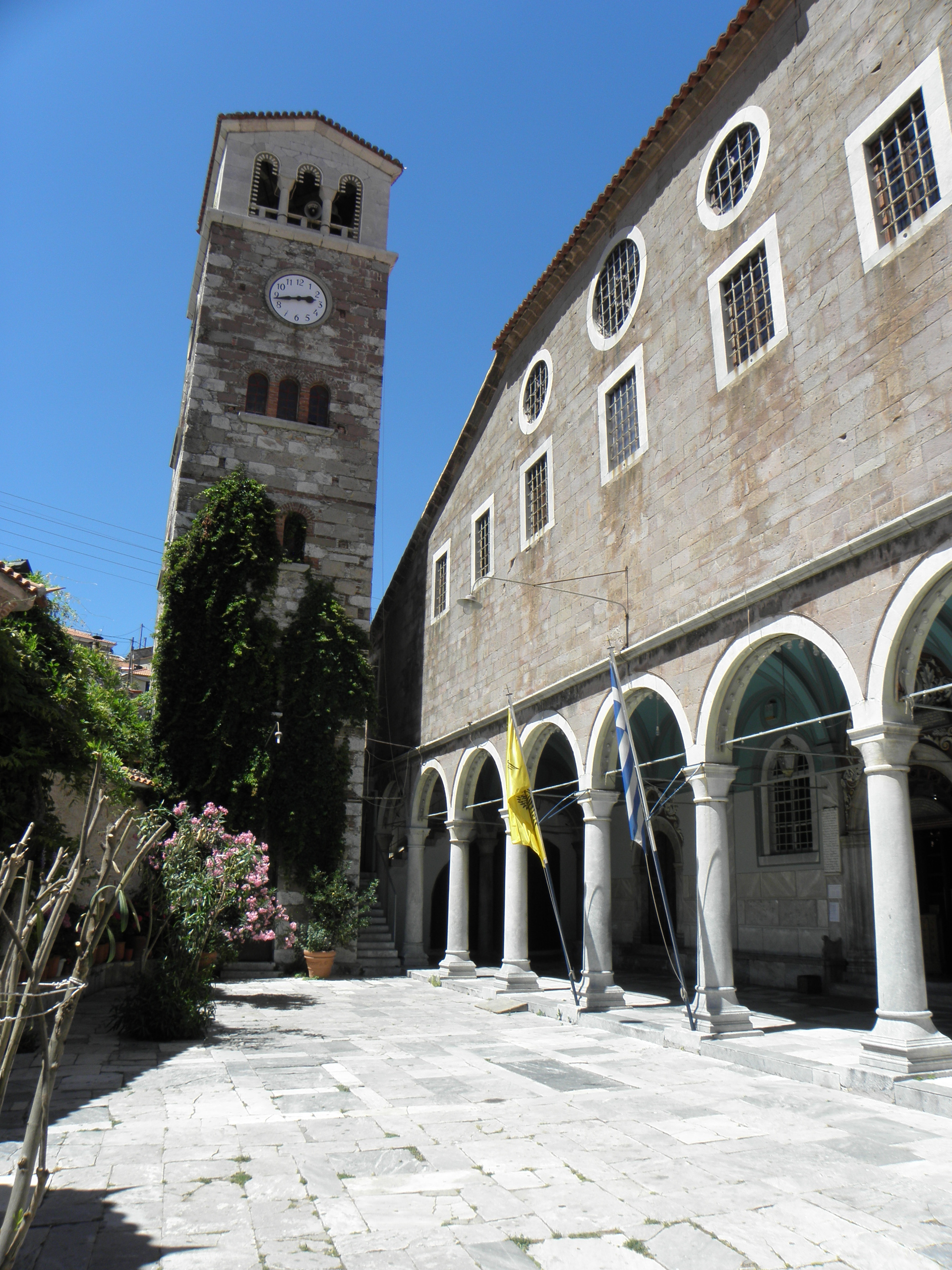

Religion
- Affiliation: Greek Orthodox
- Province: Lesbos Prefecture
- Region: North Aegean administrative region
- Rite: Greek Rite
- Festival: August 15
- Ecclesiastical or organisational status: Church and Marian shrine
- Patron: Virgin Mary

Location
- Location: Agiasos, Lesvos
- Country: Greece
- Interactive map of Church of the Dormition of the Theotokos

Architecture
- Type: Three-aisled basilica
- Style: 19th-century Post-Byzantine & Neoclassical Revival
- Founder: Agathon of Ephesus
- Established: 1107
- Completed: 830 (Monastic community); 1107 (1st building); 1806 (2nd building); 1815 (current building)

Specifications
- Length: (32 m) 106 feet
- Width: (26 m) 86 feet

Notable holdings
- Icon / Artwork: Panagia Agia Sion (c. 780-803)

The Church of the Dormition of the Theotokos in Agiasos, Lesvos, is a pilgrimage site for thousands of people during the Dormition of the Virgin festival in Greece on August 15. Some visitors walk over 25 kilometers (15.5 miles) to the holy site from Mytilene, and the church is considered a Marian shrine similar to Our Lady of Tinos. The town of Agiasos was built around a holy relic brought to the location in the early part of 800 AD by a monk named Agathon of Ephesus from Jerusalem, Israel. The name of the sacred icon is Panagia Agia Sion. A monastic community was formed, housing the sacred relic, and by 1107 the first Church of the Dormition of the Theotokos was built in the area. The town took on the name of the sacred relic Agia Sion and eventually became known as Agiasos. By the 1800s, locals tried to erect a second church, which was burned down. The third and final church, which is at the location of the original place started by Agathon of Ephesus, was built in 1815.

The building is a three-aisled basilica measuring approximately 32.20 meters in length and 26.20 meters in width, built in the 19th-century Post-Byzantine & Neoclassical Revival style. The structure features an exonarthex and a portico with a vaulted ceiling called a ribbed groin vault and an arcade. The arcades feature a succession of arches and are supported by a colonnade of Ancient Greek columns. The church interior features the classic marble iconostasis. The church grounds also feature a bell tower (campanili) and an ecclesiastical museum with artifacts dating back to the Middle Byzantine period. Artwork in the church dates from 800 to the present.

== History ==
Panagia Agia Sion

The Church of the Dormition of the Theotokos has an elaborate history rooted in the first iconoclastic period of the Byzantine Empire, which lasted from 730 to 787. Agathon of Ephesus, a priest at the Church of the Virgin of the Pharos in Constantinople, was exiled to Jerusalem because he was an iconophile. Emperor Leo IV, who reigned from September 14, 775, to September 8, 780, exiled secret iconophiles. Eventually, Agathon of Ephesus (?–February 2, 830) traveled from Jerusalem to the island of Lesvos around 803. During the same period, Empress Irene of Athens, who was also an iconophile, was exiled to the same island.

Agathon migrated to Mount Olympus on Lesvos, a 3,173-foot (967-meter) mountain that features 1,400 species of flora. Agathon brought sacred relics with him, including an icon from Israel called the "Mitir Theou, Agia Sion" ("Mother of God, Holy Zion"). The monk also carried a silver cross made from wood from the True Cross, a manuscript Gospel, and other sacred relics. The icon later became known as Panagia Agia Sion.

Agathon built a hermitage on the mountain in an area that became known as Agia Sion (Holy Zion) in honor of the relic he brought from the Holy Land. As the hermitage grew, more monks followed Agathon's example, and a small monastic community was established. The area eventually became known as Agiassos, a name derived from Agia Sion.

Agathon died on February 2, 830, and the monks cherished his relics, placing them in a special monastic crypt. The icon of Panagia Agia Sion became a local legend, and people traveled from all over on holy pilgrimages to the village. By 1170, the first Church of the Dormition of the Theotokos was erected on the exact site where Agathon's relics were kept, and the monastic community thrived. An entire town eventually grew around the church.

The first church lasted for over 633 years and was tragically in need of restoration. Locals decided to demolish the historic building to build a second one. The second building began to be erected in 1806 and was nearly finished, but on August 6, 1812, the entire town of Agiasos caught fire, and the second edifice was destroyed; luckily, only one icon was lost. The third and current church was built in 1815.

== Architectural Design ==
Ribbed groin-vaulted portico of the exonarthex

The current church was the third church building built on the location of the monastery of Agio Sion. The building is a three-aisled basilica measuring approximately 32.20 meters in length and 26.20 meters in width. An inscription on the narthex dates the building to 1815. The structure features an exonarthex, which is an outer entrance hall stylistically common to early Christian churches or Byzantine architecture. The style is considered 19th-century Post-Byzantine & Neoclassical Revival.

Pilgrims kissing an icon of the Virgin Mary during the festival.

The inner narthex is called endonarthex, and the outer narthex is the exonarthex. The church features both an endonarthex and an exonarthex. Typically, an exonarthex leads to an inner hall; the esonarthex (or endonarthex), leads to the main worship area. The exonarthex of the Church of the Dormition of the Theotokos also features a portico. The portico is a covered porch supported by ancient Greek temple-style columns that leads to the entrance of a building. The portico features a vaulted ceiling called a ribbed groin vault and an arcade, which is a succession of arches supported by a colonnade of Ancient Greek columns.

Elements of the structure are similar to the Basilica of Sant'Ambrogio in Milan, Italy. Both churches feature an exonarthex and bell towers (campanili). The portico of the Basilica of Sant'Ambrogio features a groin vault, while the Dormition of the Theotokos (Agiasos) features ribbed groin-vaulted porticos.

The interior of the building features the classic marble iconostasis built in the early 1800s. The paintings on the wall are dated around 1838. Notable works feature inscriptions thanking the guild of tailors of Agiasos, created by a painter named Nikiforos in 1801. Another icon of Saint Anthony, completed by a painter named Georgios of Asomatos, bears the inscription Funded by the Guild of Olive-Mill Workers. The church features artwork spanning from the 10th century to the 19th century. The church grounds also feature an ecclesiastical museum where some of the secret treasures of Agathon of Ephesus still exist today.

== Gallery ==
Procession during the Festival of the Dormition of the Virgin

Church Building Side View

Small Virgin Icon

== See Also ==
- Our Lady of Tinos

== Bibliography ==
- Willett, David; Hellander, Paul; Oliver, Jeanne (2004). Greek Islands. New York, NY: Hachette Book Group. ISBN 9781740594738.
- Drakopoulou, Evgenia (2008). Aναλυτικοί Πίνακες των Ελλήνων Ζωγράφων και των Έργων τους (1450-1850) [Detailed Tables of Greek Painters and Their Works (1450–1850)] (PDF) (in Greek). Athens, Greece: Center for Modern Greek Studies, National Research Foundation.
