= Agiasos =

Agiasos Αγιάσος
- Municipal unit
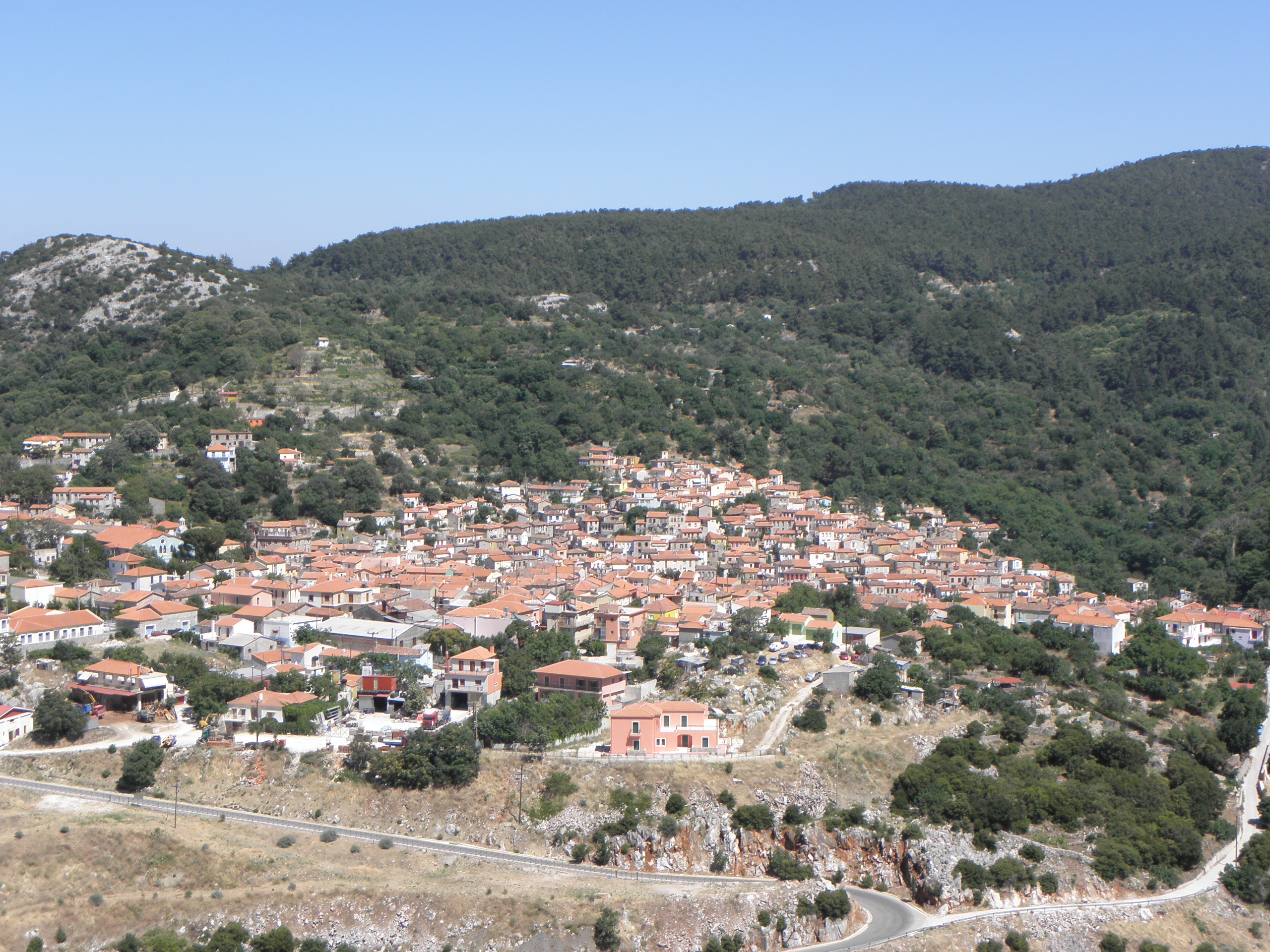

- Location within the regional unit

- Location within Greece
- Coordinates: 39°2′N 26°25′E
- Country: Greece
- Administrative region: North Aegean
- Regional unit: Lesbos
- Municipality: Mytilene

Area
  - Municipal unit: 79.924 km^{2} (30.859 sq mi)
- Elevation: 452 m (1,483 ft)

Population (2021)
  - Municipal unit: 2,001
  - Municipal unit density: 25.04/km^{2} (64.84/sq mi)
- Time zone: UTC+2 (EET)
  - Summer (DST): UTC+3 (EEST)
- Postal code: 811 01
- Area code: 22520
- Vehicle registration: MY

Agiasos (Greek: Αγιάσος) is a small town and a former municipality on the island of Lesbos, North Aegean, Greece. Since the 2019 local government reform, it became a municipality unit that is part of the municipality of Mytilene. The municipal unit has an area of 79.924 km^{2}. It is located at the slopes of mount Olympos, at a height of 475 meters (1,558 ft), 26 kilometers (16 mi) from Mytilene. Agiasos is home to a church known as the Church of the Dormition of the Theotokos. The location is considered the second-largest Marian pilgrimage site in Greece during the celebration of the Dormition of the Mother of God, featuring a Marian shrine similar to Tinos. On August 15, during the holiday devoted to the Virgin Mary, thousands of people walk 16 miles from Mytilini to Agiasos.

== History ==
Panagia Agia Sion original name of the village of Agiasos. ce. 700-800

The village of Agiasos was originally named Agia Sion (Holy Zion) and was developed in the middle Byzantine period. A monk named Agathon of Ephesus settled in the region around 803 AD and became a hermit. The monk was a priest at the Church of the Virgin of the Pharos in Constantinople and was exiled to Jerusalem because he was an iconophile. Emperor Emperor Leo IV reigned from September 14, 775, to September 8, 780, and was a proponent of the first iconoclastic period. During the same period, Empress Irene of Athens, who was also an iconophile, was exiled to Lesvos.

Agathon traveled to Mount Olympus on Lesvos, a 3,173-foot (967-meter) mountain with 1,400 species of flora. Agathon carried sacred relics with him, including an icon from Israel called the "Mitir Theou, Agia Sion" ("Mother of God, Holy Zion"). Agathon also carried a silver cross made from wood from the True Cross, a manuscript Gospel, and other sacred relics. The sacred icon later became known as Panagia Agia Sion.

In what is known as modern Agiasos, Agathon built a hermitage on the mountain. Early on, the area was called Agia Sion (Holy Zion) in honor of the relic he brought from the Holy Land. As the hermitage grew, more monks followed Agathon's example, and a small monastic community was established. The area eventually became known as Agiassos, a name derived from Agia Sion.

Agathon died on February 2, 830. The remaining community of monks cherished his relics. They placed them in a special crypt. Over the years, the place became popular. The icon of Panagia Agia Sion became a local legend, and people traveled from all over on holy pilgrimages to the village. By 1170, the first small stone Church of the Dormition of the Theotokos was erected on the exact site where Agathon's relics were kept, and the monastic community thrived, consisting of about 50 to 100 monks. An entire town eventually grew around the church.

Pilgrims kissing an icon of the Virgin Mary during the Dormition of the Virgin Mary festival in Agiasos.

Farmers slowly began to settle in the region, but when the island was conquered by the Ottoman Empire, some families sought refuge on the mountain top to avoid taxes and persecution. There were no roads, and to get to the sacred village, locals had to travel via secret trails and passages. Most locals used donkeys. By 1700, the village featured a small settlement of roughly forty houses. In 1701, a Turkish governor became seriously ill; his headquarters were in Sykounta, Lesvos. The local administrator heard of the miraculous place, and elders from the village came, incensed, and sprinkled the holy water of Zoodochou Pigi on him, and he was saved by a miracle. The governor requested the sultan to issue a special decree that the area was exempt from taxes, known as a sultan's firman. The incentive drew many families from across the island. By 1729, the village population had risen to 500 families. By the late 1700s, the village population grew with artisans and craftsmen, but the special tax exemption, or firman, was abolished in 1783.

Agiasos

The village became so popular that by 1806, the small existing church, which was over 633 years old, could not handle the massive number of pilgrims. The Metropolitan of Mytilene Ieremios ordered the construction of a new church in the region. But the church was not allowed to be bigger than the previous church. The locals built a bigger one despite the law. On August 6, 1812, a fire broke out, burning a large section of the small town and the new church, but most of the icons were saved, except one: a small icon of Jesus.

The third and final church, the Church of the Dormition of the Theotokos, was built by order of Metropolitan Callinicos of Mytilene. Sultan Mahmud II gave special permission for the church to be built as requested by the inhabitants of Agiassos. The church was a three-aisled basilica built in the 19th-century Post-Byzantine & Neoclassical Revival. It houses the sacred relics of Agathon of Ephesus. Namely, the icon that the village is named after, Panagia Agia Sion.

Another fire broke out in the village in 1877 that almost destroyed the entire village except the church. Most of the houses were made of wood, but after the fire of 1877, they were built of stone. The village of Agiassos currently features a population of 3000 permanent residents, but in the 1960s there were 8000 residents. On August 15, during the holiday devoted to the Virgin Mary, thousands of people walk 16 miles from Mytilini to Agiasos, and the area becomes saturated with vendors from all over the world, selling merchandise. The festival is a huge boost to the village's economy.

== Gallery ==
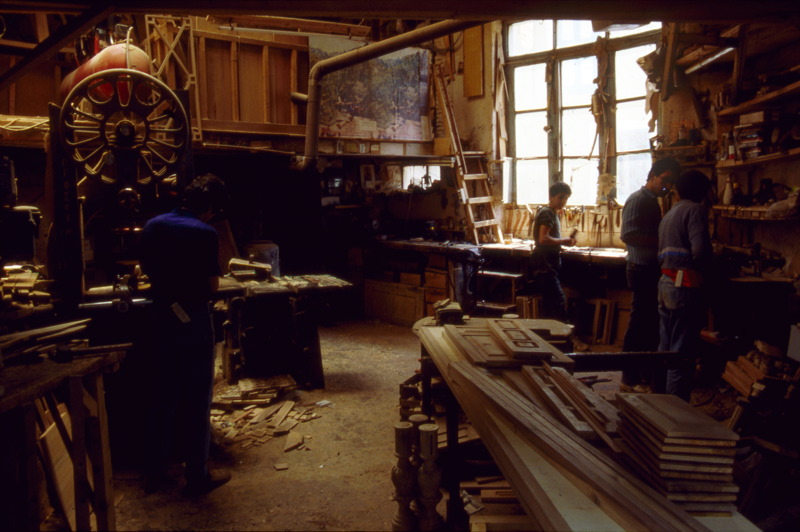
Woodworkers of Agiassos

Shop in Agiassos

Watchmaker in Agiassos

Small Steep Village Roads

Butcher Shop in Agiassos

== See Also ==
- Koukloutzas
