= Altındağ, İzmir =

Coordinates: 38.400°N 27.200°E

Altındağ (Kokluca) is a densely populated zone (semt) of İzmir's Bornova district. The main intercity bus terminal of İzmir - IZOTAŞ is situated in Altındağ's Işıkkent quarter and is minutes away from Altındağ centre on foot. Altindag means "The Golden Mountain" in Turkish and the name is believed to have been given in reference to Greek soldiers and former inhabitants who buried their treasures in the mountain. Once covered by orchards, Altindag became a major destination for immigrants. While the oldest inhabitants live in the skirts of the hill, Turkish immigrants coming from Yugoslavia and Bulgaria gathered in northern quarter of the zone. The area had an extensive population of Greeks before 1922 when the name of the area was Koukloutzas. The survivors of this population were settled in Greece where they founded the town Neos Koukloutzas.

Altindag is still a major place for cement production in Izmir, despite the fact that it is a populous place in the city center. The mountain was reserved for cement production by Adnan Menderes and given to Çimentaş company.

== See also ==
- Bornova
