= Bornova =

- District and municipality
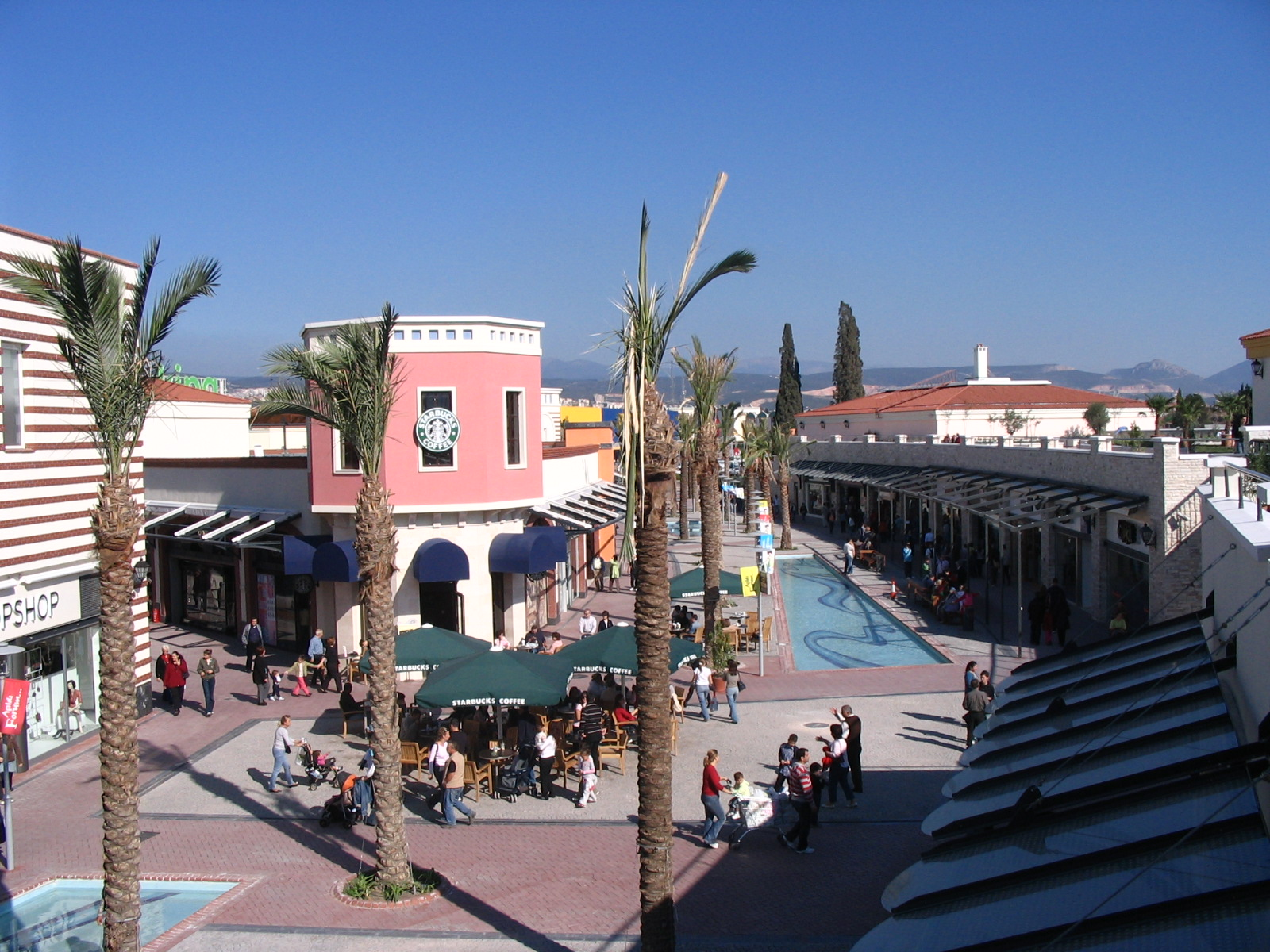
- Forum Bornova is an outdoor shopping mall

- Logo

- Map showing Bornova District in İzmir Province

- Location within Turkey Location within İzmir
- Coordinates: 38°28′11″N 27°13′16″E
- Country: Turkey
- Province: İzmir

Government
  - Mayor: Ömer EŞKİ (CHP)
- Area: 220 km^{2} (85 sq mi)
- Population (2022): 454,470
  - Density: 2,100/km^{2} (5,400/sq mi)
- Time zone: UTC+3 (TRT)
- Area code: 0232
- Website: www.bornova.bel.tr

Bornova is a municipality and district of İzmir Province, Turkey. Its area is 220 km^{2}, and its population is 454,470 (2022). It is the third largest district in İzmir's metropolitan area and is almost fully urbanized at the rate of 98.6 percent, with correspondingly high levels of development in terms of industries and services. Bornova's center is situated at a distance of 8 km (5 mi) to the northeast of the traditional center of İzmir (Konak Square in Konak, İzmir) and 5 km (3 mi) from the coastline at the tip of the Gulf of İzmir to the west. Bornova district area is surrounded by the district areas of Yunusemre (Manisa Province) and Menemen to the north, Kemalpaşa to the east, Buca to the south, and Konak and Karşıyaka to the west, where the larger part of İzmir's urban area extends. Bornova is home to Ege University's main campus and associated hospital, one of the largest and foremost medical centers in western Turkey.

== Name and origins ==
During the Ottoman period, Bornova was called بیرون‌آباد "Birunabad", often rendered as "Bournabad" or "Bournabat" in Western sources, which is a Persian name meaning "outside village" (the Persian ābād آباد means village/city, same suffix as in the names such as Haydarabad and Islamabad). Although befitting a settlement slightly outside a greater metropolitan zone, that the name "Birunabad" is based on an adjective in Bornova's case, makes an association with an earlier Byzantine name or Slavic origin, more likely. In fact, under the Byzantine and Nicean Empires the region was called "Prinobaris" and was notable for being a source of considerable revenues for the Haghia Sophia from its attached properties here, and was for this reason alternatively known as "Hagiosophitike chora". As such, Birunabad, Bournabat and now Bornova could be converted forms of this name.

The recent discovery, within the boundaries of Bornova district, of Yeşilova Höyük, on which the fieldwork continues, seems to indicate that Bornova's alluvial plain, fed by several small streams, was the site of the first settlement by the Neolithic-Calcolithic inhabitants of the region across present-day İzmir's metropolitan area.

== Administrative divisions ==
The municipality of Bornova was established in 1881 and the town became a district center in 1957. Aziz Kocaoğlu, mayor of İzmir Greater Metropolitan Municipality from 2004 to 2019, was the mayor of Bornova before taking over his office for the city as a whole.

There are 45 neighbourhoods in Bornova District:

- Atatürk
- Barbaros
- Beşyol
- Birlik
- Çamiçi
- Çamkule
- Çiçekli
- Çınar
- Doğanlar
- Egemenlik
- Eğridere
- Ergene
- Erzene
- Evka 3
- Evka 4
- Gaziosmanpaşa
- Gökdere
- Gürpınar
- İnönü
- Işıklar
- Karaçam
- Karacaoğlan
- Kavaklıdere
- Kayadibi
- Kazım Dirik
- Kemalpaşa
- Kızılay
- Koşukavak
- Kurudere
- Laka
- Meriç
- Merkez
- Mevlana
- Naldöken
- Rafetpaşa
- Sarnıç
- Serintepe
- Tuna
- Ümit
- Yakaköy
- Yeşilçam
- Yeşilova
- Yıldırımbeyazıt
- Yunusemre
- Zafer

Several unofficial denominations for neighborhoods are also in common use across İzmir and beyond to describe localities often with determined centers but vague boundaries, such as Altındağ and Pınarbaşı.

== 19th century Bornova and the great Levantine mansions ==
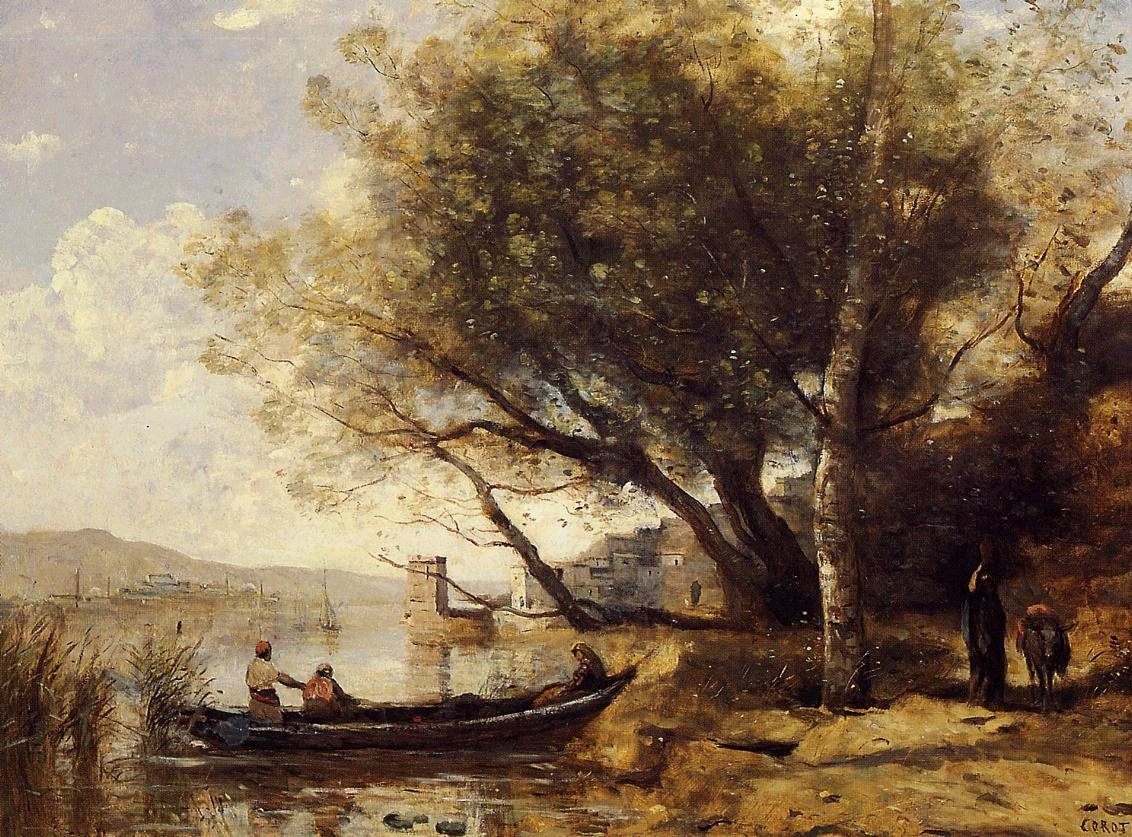
"Bournabat, Smyrne", as imagined by Jean-Baptiste-Camille Corot in an 1873 painting ordered, and subsequently refused, by the Turkish collector Eram Bey.

With a total bed capacity of only 400 across the district, most of which is accounted by the suburb's single large hotel, the accommodation facilities are rather limited inside Bornova, and the hotels in İzmir's center are generally preferred for a night's stay.

Despite that, visitors on a leisure tour are a common sight in Bornova's streets due to the town's historical center having been much in favor in the 19th century among İzmir's European and Levantine residents who left very visible architectural traces, in the form especially of the Levantine mansions of İzmir.

Indeed, Bornova used to be a summer residence for many foreign consuls and wealthy businessmen fleeing the stagnantly hot weather in central İzmir to seek the cooler breeze of the slopes of Mount Yamanlar, the departure point of Bornova in its beginnings. This move by diplomats and the rich was at the very origin of the town's growth in the beginning of the 19th century, until which time Bornova used to be a small forestry village, recorded in Ottoman times principally in connection with the task of guarding the mountain passes leading to İzmir which was assigned to its inhabitants in exchange of certain tax reliefs.

Moving to Bornova during summer for a month or two had entered among the habits of İzmir's European/Levantine inhabitants since the preceding century, but while their rich increasingly opted to live here permanently, the city's Europeans/Levantines with more modest social conditions seem to have ceased to come to Bornova, even for the summer, by the 1820s.

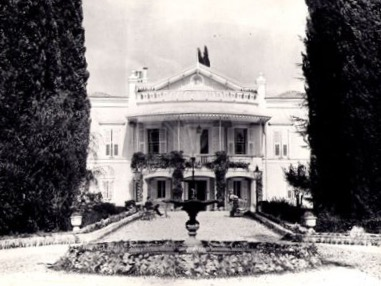
The Paterson Mansion in central Bornova, as seen in a photograph showing its original state.

The mansions and residences built in the 19th century, most of which reached our day, restored and in public or private use, are usually still named after the prestigious names of the former owners, such as Whittall, Maltass, Paterson, Giraud, Edwards, Belhomme, Pandespanian. There is a small Catholic Church named the "Church of Santa Maria" in the main square of Bornova and an Anglican chapel and Bornova Anglican Cemetery nearby, both dating from the 19th century, landmarks of Bornova's cosmopolitan past. Despite the obvious luxurious style of the residences they built, these new inhabitants did not always have lives in all comfort. The soar observed in the course of the 19th century in a particular form of brigandage, sometimes interpreted as a form of social resistance and usually associated with Efe tradition and with the coastal strait along the Aegean Sea as well as its valleys reaching inland, often had Bornova as its frontier land. A number of notorious cases of kidnapping involving brigands and the owners of these residences and high demands of ransom occurred frequently basis for almost a hundred years.

Bornova held the first football match ever in the Ottoman Empire, played in 1890 between British sailors on shore leave against young men of İzmir. Turkey's first athletic contest was also held in Bornova in 1895.

== Modern Bornova ==
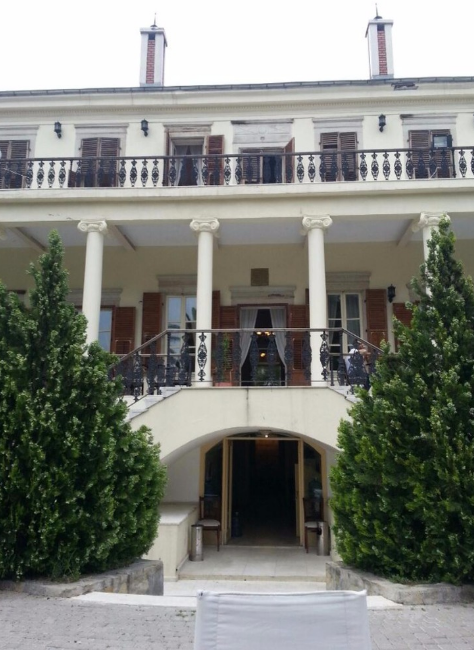
The Edwards Villa in Bornova, known today as the Murat Villa (Murat Köşkü)

Bornova greatly expanded in the last decades from its nest under Mount Yamanlar, where the historic and popular Turkish quarter of Erzene was juxtaposed by Levantine settlements, and today almost fully covers its surrounding Bornova plain, formerly renowned for its fertility. The previous tangerine orchards, as well as the famed okra (gumbo) gardens synonymous with the town's name (Bornova bamyası), which had a secure place among the dozen cultivars, traditional and commercial, of Turkey, were for the most part replaced by apartment blocks and the notoriety of Bornova's okras are now taken over by those of Urla. The urban growth occurred the direction both of the seashore and to the east towards Kemalpaşa, as well as to the south in Altındağ zone and İzmir-Aydın motorway.

The population's growth rate reached as high as 30-35% in certain years. New neighborhoods consisting of block apartments were built rapidly, some of which carry the name of the real estate developers who had initiated the construction boom, such as Özkanlar and Çamkıran. Bornova could nevertheless preserve its orderly outlook, with privately -and legally- built constructions and social housing projects keeping at pace with the increase in population, and very few slum-type residences, of which many boomtowns across Turkey are still scourged with. Bornova district counts 147,037 residential buildings.

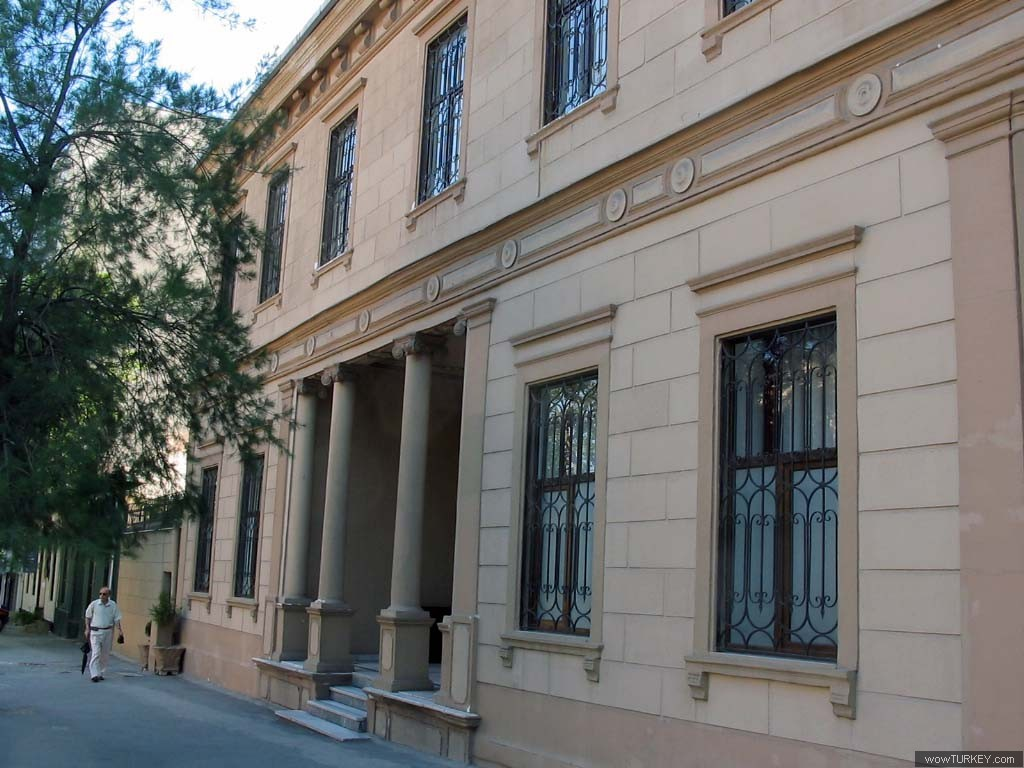
A Levantine house in Bornova

A number of incidents occurred in recent times on count of delays in improvements along the river beds of the four streams that cross Bornova to join the Gulf of İzmir (Bornova, Laka, Manda and Şeytanderesi brooks), while residences were mushrooming around these. Furthermore, two cement mills and stone quarries, opened in what were empty fields decades ago, are now located next to residences, and the pollution caused by the former establishments is an ongoing issue of concern.

=== Transport ===
A "square", more in the form of crossroads in a roundabout, slightly past the entry into Bornova coming from Manisa and which continues towards İzmir center, is the focal point of motor vehicle traffic in Bornova, with Ege University campus and large department stores extending to its south and residential areas served by smaller streets to the north.

Bornova center is served by a railway connection since 1867, initially by a branch line of İzmir-Kasaba (Turgutlu) railway completed during the same decade.

Bornova is currently the eastern terminus of İzmir's subway rapid transit line whose extension continues, and access to and from the city center, as well as between various localities of İzmir is relatively easy with either public or private transport.

Since İzmir's central bus terminal, the huge İZOTAŞ in Altındağ quarter where an estimated fifty thousand people arrive or depart each day, as well as the road junctions connecting İzmir and the regions to its south, to Istanbul, Ankara and the rest of Turkey, are located within the boundaries of Bornova, intercity connections are made relatively easy.

=== Education ===
Type of educational establishment	Nr. of institutions	Male students	Female students	Teachers
Kindergarten	102	2,091	2,078	225
Primary school	80	30,529	27,928	2,296
Secondary-level professional	22	5,732	7,067	771
Other high schools	19	4,712	3,515	501
Total	223	43,063	40,588	37,093

Bornova has 80 primary schools and 102 kindergartens. At secondary-level education, there are 19 high schools and 22 professional schools. The figures for the student and teacher's corps are shown in the table. The average student per teacher ratio is (22,1%), with primary education the most congested at 25,5%.

Higher-level educational institutions are assembled under the structure of Ege University, which brings together 11 faculties, 7 institutes, 6 higher education centers and 7 higher professional schools and 25 research centers. The university had 42,693 students and 2,895 academic staff in 2007.

In adult education, the state-managed Public Training Center and Professional Training Centers offer courses in various practical fields with a total of ~100 trainers, and 12,356 people including participants in literacy courses received courses in these establishments in 2006. Illiteracy is an issue almost exclusively restricted to new migrants into Bornova, and especially to women among these. There are also a number of private initiatives in the same field, such as the 29 companies offering driver's license courses.

=== Professions ===
HEALTH	Nr. of institutions	Nr. of beds	Nr. of doctors	Nr. of nurses	Nr. of auxiliary staff	Nr. of patients served in 2006
University hospital	1	1,811	2,078	225	225	629,235
Public clinics	19	none	127	179	88	n/a
Polyclinic	23	n/a	n/a	n/a	n/a	n/a
Urgency and traumatology hospital	1	63	100	68	100	492,752
General hospitals	2	2,400	n/a	n/a	n/a	n/a
Dispensary (for tuberculosis)	1	none	5	4	5	n/a
Mothercare, childcare, family planning centers	3	none	25	32	11	1,140,018
Village clinic	6	none	n/a	n/a	n/a	n/a
Dental institute	1	none	n/a	14	n/a	128,585
Medical labs	28	none	n/a	n/a	n/a	n/a
Pharmacies	208	none	n/a	n/a	n/a	n/a

The total of district's commercial enterprises numbering 28,016, the figure reached by accumulating the total production, retail, wholesale units and connected offices neighbors around forty five thousand, which results in the picture of a very active district.

855 Bornova companies are registered exporters and a total amount of $596,224,735 US Dollars could be estimated for 2006 as exports which were made by Bornova district companies. 83 companies with foreign capital participation operate in Bornova and the recorded amount of foreign direct investments between 1997-2007 was $71,928,267 US Dollars. International companies which operate with sizable Bornova bases, BMC, Tuborg, Efes Pilsen, and CMS Tyres can be cited. The textile and clothing wholesalers are concentrated in MTK industrial and marketing zone, built exclusively for these industries.

Bornova's vast plain has been a preferred location for more than a century for İzmir's industrial base. The choice of Bornova by numerous official institutions as their regional headquarters, combined with the services industry, with medical and legal services especially standing out, as well as other professions, all contribute to the pace of the district. Agricultural production is comparatively very modest in added value.

=== Sport ===
The local women's football team Bornova Hitab Spor was promoted to the Turkish Women's Super League at the end of the 2023-24 Women's First League season.

=== Shopping and leisure ===
One of the two largest shopping malls of İzmir, Forum Bornova, extending over 67,000 square meters, is located in Bornova. It includes an IKEA store, a MIGROS superstore, seven movie theaters, and other leisure and entertainment facilities. Bornova's other shopping mall, Park Bornova, was, at 33,000 square meters, İzmir's largest at the time of its opening and the first to fit the description of a modern shopping mall in the city. It is still İzmir's largest outlet center and boasts of its own movie theaters, 8-lane indoor bowling and an entertainment center (Smart Play) with various games.

Bornova's open market days or bazaars (held every Wednesday and Sunday) are also well known in the region and have a variety of fresh fruits, vegetables, clothing, kitchenware and crafted products can be found by joining the crowd of the market.

There are three theater buildings in Bornova, the one located inside the town's central park, Uğur Mumcu Theater being the most popular. The one museum located within Bornova is Ege University's large Natural History Museum, integrated into the university structure and it is the second largest in Turkey in its field after that MTA in Ankara. There are five libraries with a collection of books numbering 32,378 in total (excepting Ege University library) and three congress centers, all three privately managed within the structure of Bornova's single large hotel.

279 parks in all, almost all with playgrounds for children, are scattered across Bornova. The Pınarbaşı Racing Circuit for go-kart and motorcycle racing is situated in Pınarbaşı, Bornova, which is Turkey's second longest, covering an area of 25 hectares, 7 swimming pools, 8 tennis courts, 2 indoor sports halls, 4 soccer fields and 54 basketball fields compose Bornova's sports infrastructure. 8,591 licensed sports persons inhabit the district.

Five newspapers are published in Bornova and two radio stations are in activity. The total number of cable TV subscriptions is 27,066. 412 civil associations are registered in Bornova and the total number of their members is 36,525. There are about a hundred mosques and three churches, including the abandoned, but still in reasonably good condition, Greek Orthodox Church in Doğanlar neighborhood.

A large recreational area which bears Homer's name, to whom İzmir lays one of the strongest claims, is in the phase of construction in a 3,5 km long valley to the northeast of Bornova center, and it is already very popular among residents although, located at some distance from the poet's native river Meles, the choice of the name may be historically disputable for pedantics. There is also a Roman bridge on part of the River Nif which crosses Bornova district area. The mountain passage at the locality called Belkahve where, coming from the east, one sees İzmir for the first time and in a very impressive panorama, is within Bornova district and is now arranged into a park and picnic area in memory of one such impressed incomer in 1922, Atatürk. Efforts are also made to preserve, restore and promote the village of Yakaköy with many old houses and fountains in Turkish style.

== See also ==
- Bornova Anadolu Lisesi
- Bornova Belediye
- Bornova (İzmir Metro)
- Bornova Ice Sports Hall
