= Unitron =

Coordinates: 40.809°N 73.275°W

Unitron is a US-based company and distributor of optical instruments including stereo microscopes and accessories, binoculars, and classic brass telescopes. The company was founded in 1952 by Lawrence A. Fine as the United Trading Company and located in Boston, MA. He registered the UNITRON trademark in the United States for first use in commerce in February, 1952. The company started out importing smaller (1.6" to 4" refractors) that were manufactured by Nihon Seiko of Japan. By 1961 Unitron expanded the product line to include 5" and 6" models that were suited for observatory use. A very small number of the 5" and 6" models were produced. Several of the 6" Model 620's remain operational at observatories to include: Rafes Urban Astronomy Center, Denton, Texas; Castleton State College, Castleton, Vermont, Ferris State University, Big Rapids, Michigan, and the University of Connecticut, Storrs, Connecticut.

Fine sold the company in 1975 to Ehrenreich Photo Optical Industries and it was relocated from Boston to New York. He and his wife Ellen were killed in a private airplane crash in Canada on 3 August 1978 and much of the early history of the company was lost. The Unitron as well as Polarex and lesser-known Weltblick telescopes were all manufactured by Nihon Seiko until that trading company went out of business in 1992. The telescopes (which included 1.6" to 9" refractors) were noted for their high quality specifications and metal and wood construction.

The company is currently located in Commack, New York and manufactures primarily microscopes and accessories for industrial use. The telescope product line is limited to several classic brass telescopes suited primarily for awards and presentations.
