= Ege University =

University in İzmir, Turkey

Coordinates: 38.4539°N 27.2117°E

- Ege Üniversitesi
- Type: Public research university
- Established: May 20, 1955; 71 years ago
- Affiliations: EUA; IAU; EUCEN; BSUN
- Rector: Prof. Dr. Musa Alcı
- Faculty: 3,185
- Students: 65,088
- Location: Bornova, İzmir
- Campus: Suburban, 852 acres (3.45 km^{2})
- Colors: Blue and white
- Website: ege.edu.tr

University rankings

Global – Overall
- QS World: 1001-1200 (2026)

Regional – Overall
- QS Emerging Europe and Central Asia: 103 (2022)

Ege University (Turkish: Ege Üniversitesi) is a public research university in Bornova, İzmir. It was founded in 1955 with the faculties of Medicine and Agriculture. It is the first university to start courses in İzmir (Note: There had been previous efforts by Rahmi Arslan Bey, governor of İzmir during the World War I years, and during the Greek occupation of İzmir, to build a university in İzmir (Ionian University of Smyrna), but the projects, although advanced, had not been brought to full completion and courses had not started.) and the fourth oldest university in Turkey. (Note: Founded on the same day with the Karadeniz Technical University.)

== History ==
Ege University was one of the largest universities in Turkey, with 19 faculties, 9 junior colleges, and 8 institutes, until part of it was separated to establish Dokuz Eylül University in 1982. Following this division, Ege University retained 7 faculties, 3 junior colleges, and approximately 9,000 students. Today, the university has grown to include 15 faculties, 6 junior colleges, 10 vocational training schools, 9 institutes, and 36 research centers.

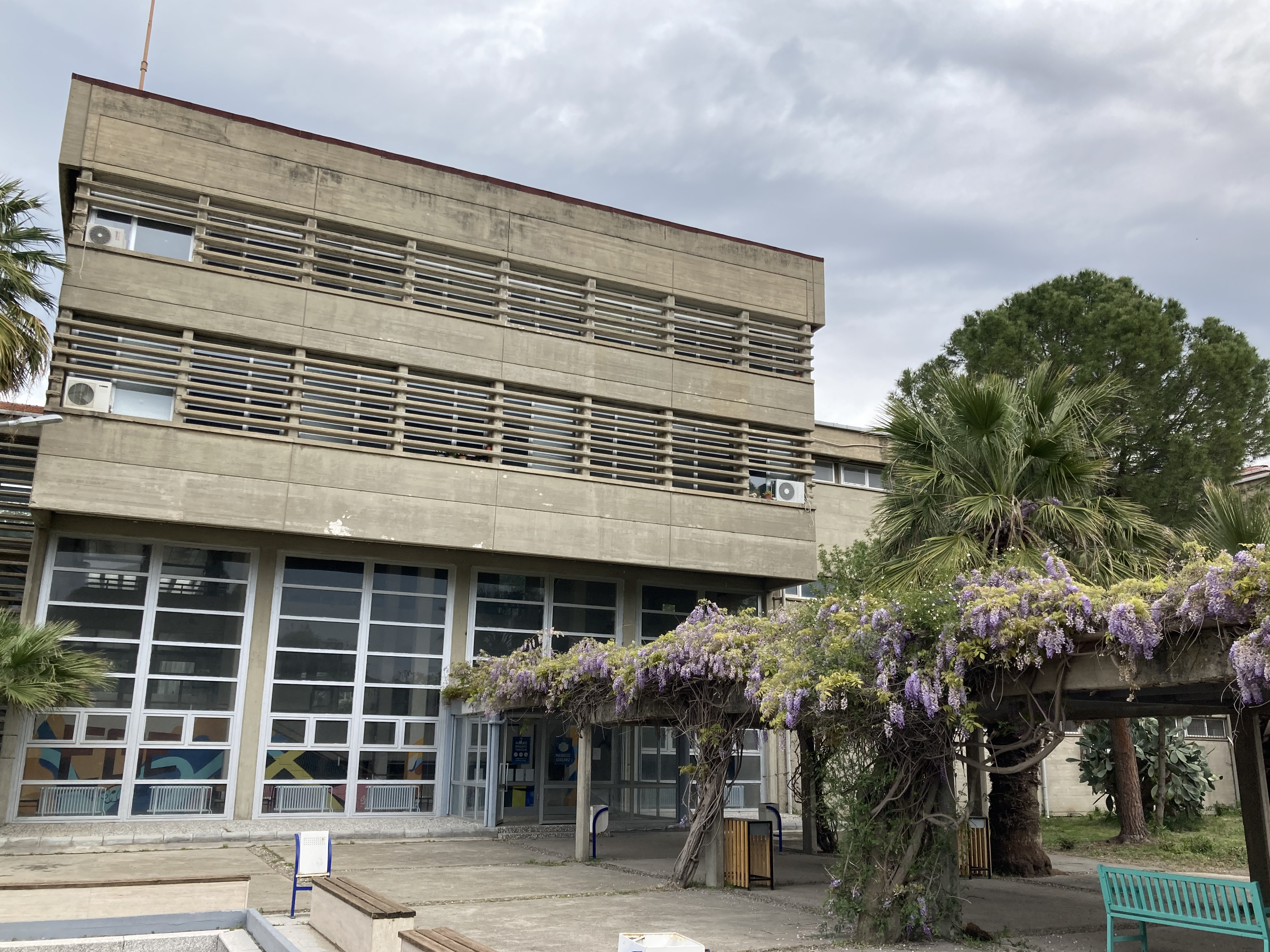
EÜ Textile Engineering Department buildings, which were built at the Ege University Campus in accordance with the plans from Germany and opened to service in 1972, is composed of management, education and training, laboratories, Training mills and auxiliary workplaces.

== Campus ==
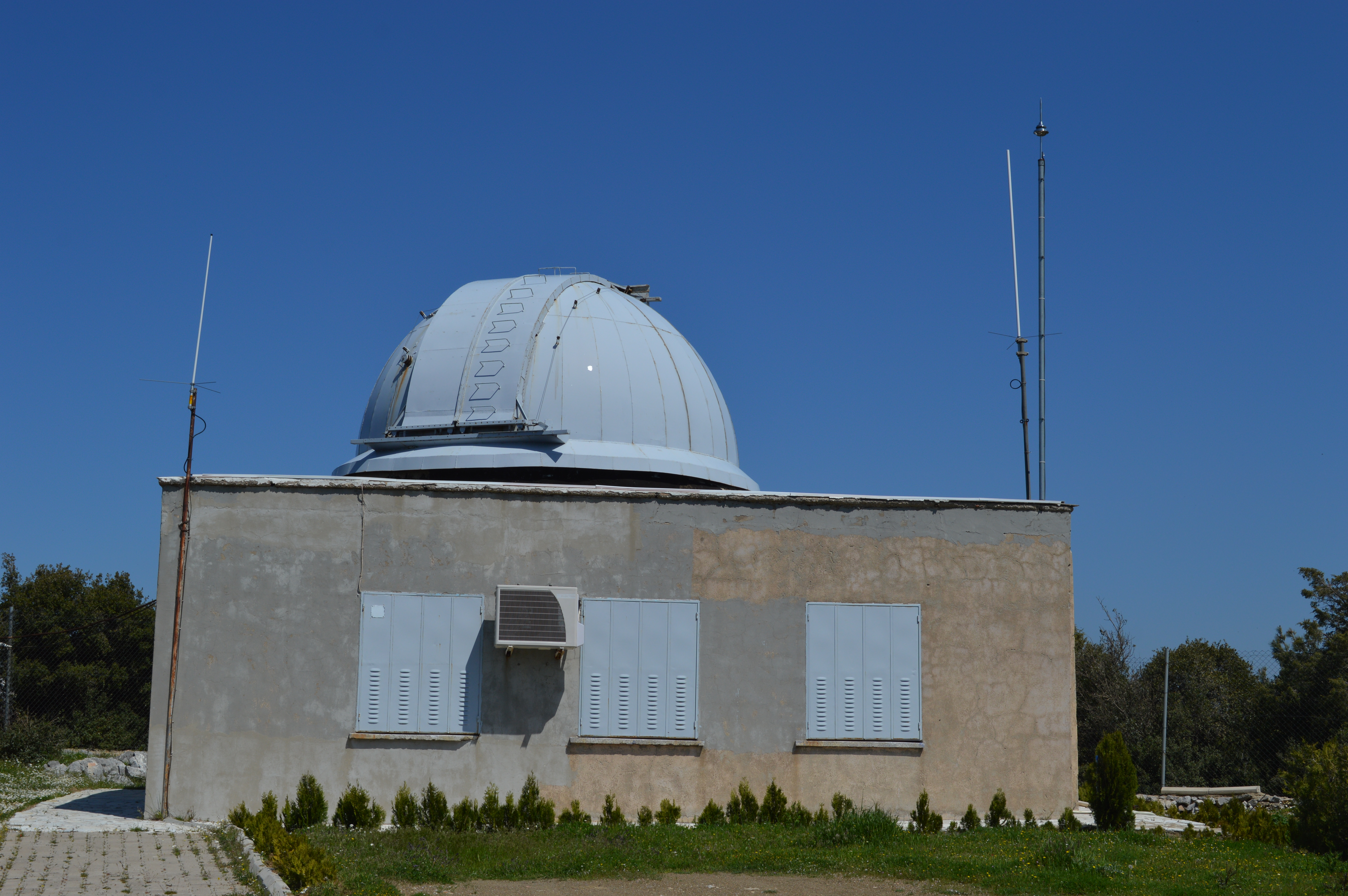
Ege University Observatory

Dormitory facilities on the campus are managed by the General Directorate of Students' Credits and Dormitories, accommodating approximately 6,000 students (excluding the Students' Village, which is managed by a private company). In addition to the rectorate, the hospital and the main campus in Bornova, Ege University operates vocational training schools in Tire, Bergama, Bayındır, and Ödemiş, as well as the Atatürk Cultural Center in Konak. Applied education centers are located in Urla, Menemen, Mordoğan, Çiğli, and Özdere. The university also maintains an observatory in Kurudağ.

Through these facilities, Ege University provides services in education, science, health, and social and cultural development to both students and the public. To further enhance these offerings, a West Campus was established in Çeşme.

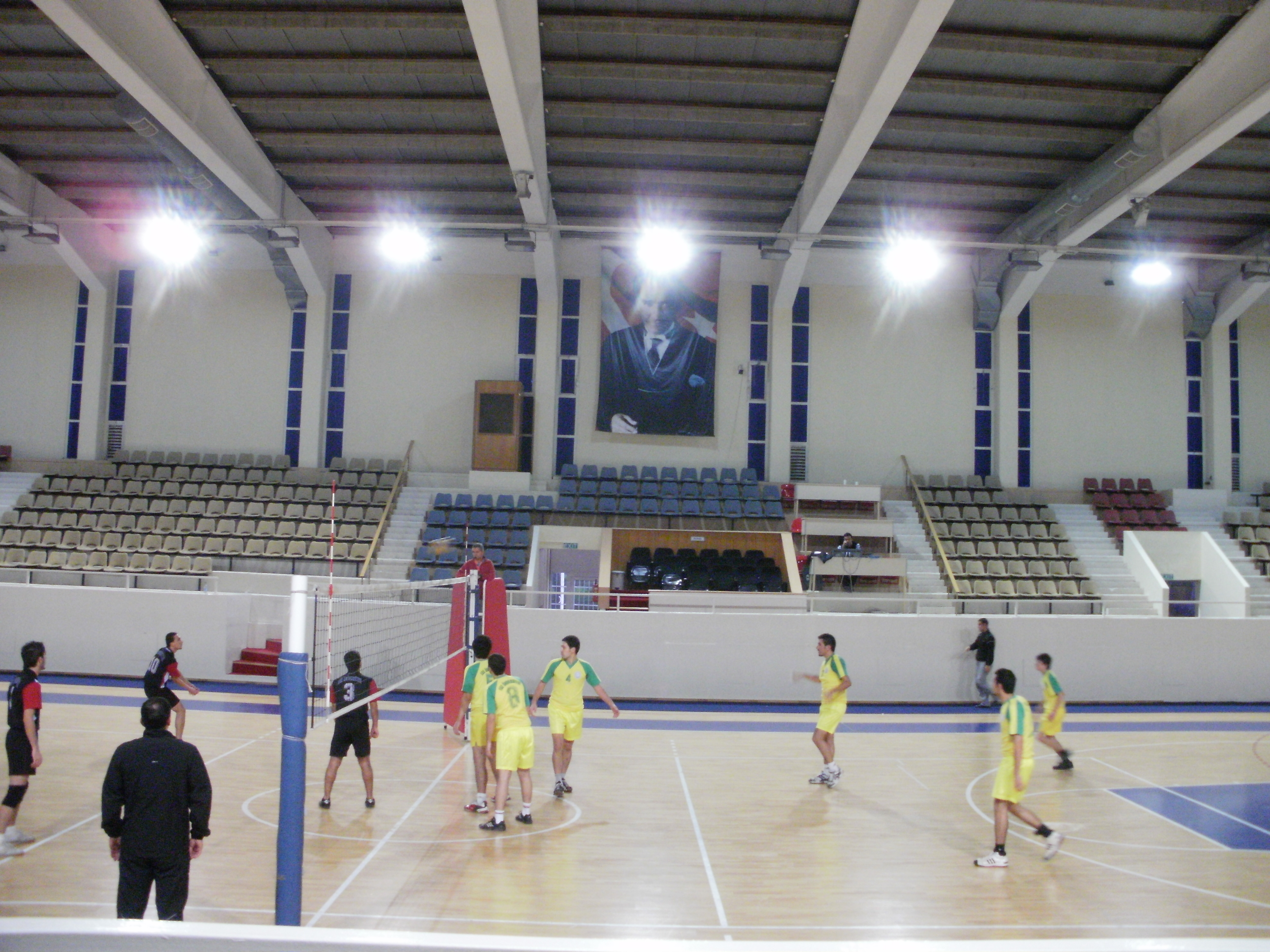
A volleyball tournament is organized between faculties at Ege University, held at the university's sports hall.

The main campus is served by Ege University metro station, while the university hospital is served by Bornova station on the M1 line as well as the bus station with the same name. The university hospital lies next to the İzmir Beltway. The hospital and main campus is served by the junctions on D.300 road.

== See also ==
- Edwards Villa
- Ege University Observatory
- List of universities in İzmir
