= Çamdibi (İzmir Metro) =

Proposed rail station in İzmir, Turkey

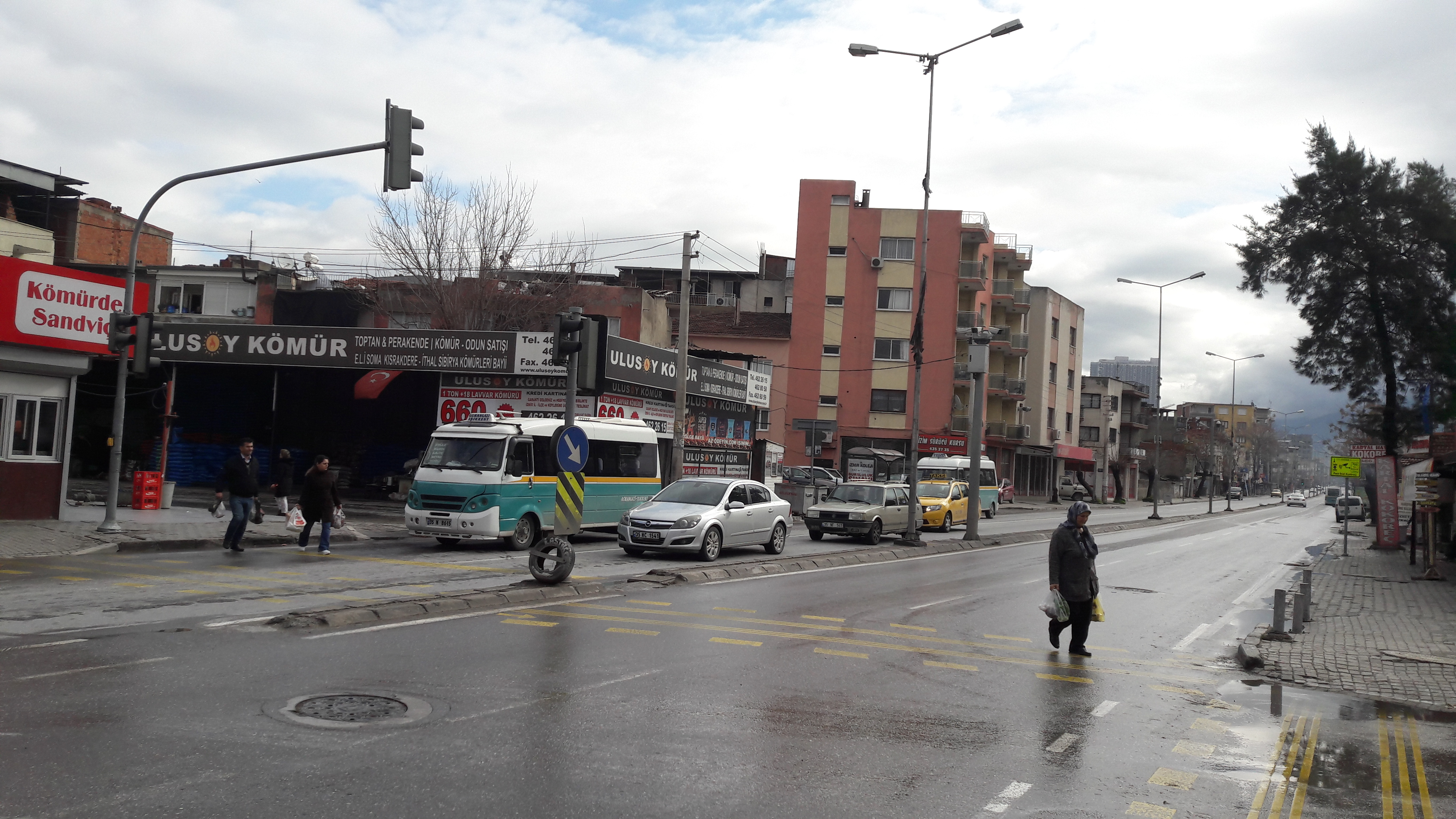
- The proposed location of Çamdibi station.

General information
- Location: Kamil Tunca Cd., Gazi Osman Paşa Mah., 35090; Bornova
- Coordinates: 38.4324°N 27.1902°E
- System: İzmir Metro rapid transit station
- Owner: İzmir Metropolitan Municipality
- Operator: İzmir Metro A.Ş.
- Line: 2 Alt
- Platforms: 1 island platform
- Tracks: 2

Construction
- Accessible: Yes

History
- Opening: 2024

Services
Preceding station	İzmir Metro	Following station
Future service
Vakıflar towards Halkapınar	M5	Altındağ towards Otogar
Location

Çamdibi is a proposed underground station on the M5 Line of the İzmir Metro. It will be located beneath Kamil Tunca Avenue near the intersection with 5227th Street in the southwest Bornova. Construction of the station, along with the metro line, is scheduled to begin in 2018.

Çamdibi station is expected to open in 2024.
