= Vakıflar (İzmir Metro) =

Proposed metro station for İzmir Metro

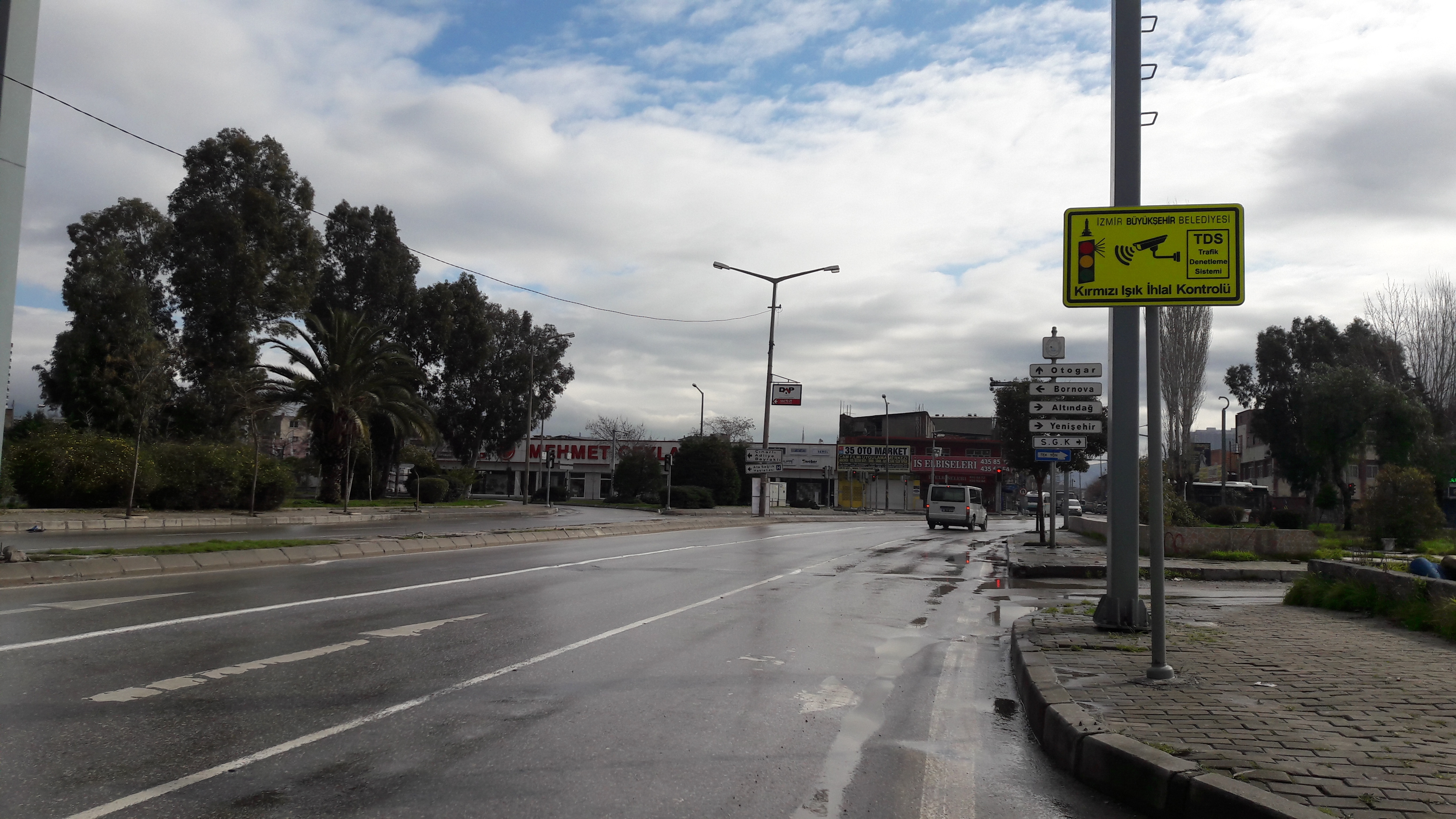
- The proposed location of Vakıflar station, just south of İzmir Atatürk Stadium.

General information
- Location: Şehitler Cd., Mersinli Mah., 35170; Konak
- Coordinates: 38.4330°N 27.1796°E
- System: İzmir Metro rapid transit station
- Owner: İzmir Metropolitan Municipality
- Operator: İzmir Metro A.Ş.
- Line: 2 Alt
- Platforms: 1 island platform
- Tracks: 2

Construction
- Accessible: Yes

History
- Opened: 2020 (Expected)

Services
Preceding station	İzmir Metro	Following station
Future service
Halkapınar Terminus	M5	Çamdibi towards Otogar
Location

Vakıflar is a proposed underground station on the M5 Line of the İzmir Metro. It will be located beneath Şehitler Avenue near the intersection with Fatih Avenue just south of Atatürk Stadium. Construction of the station, along with the metro line, was scheduled to begin in 2018. Vakıflar station was expected to open in 2020.

== Nearby Places of Interest ==
- İzmir Atatürk Stadium
