= Homeros Boulevard =

- Uçanyol
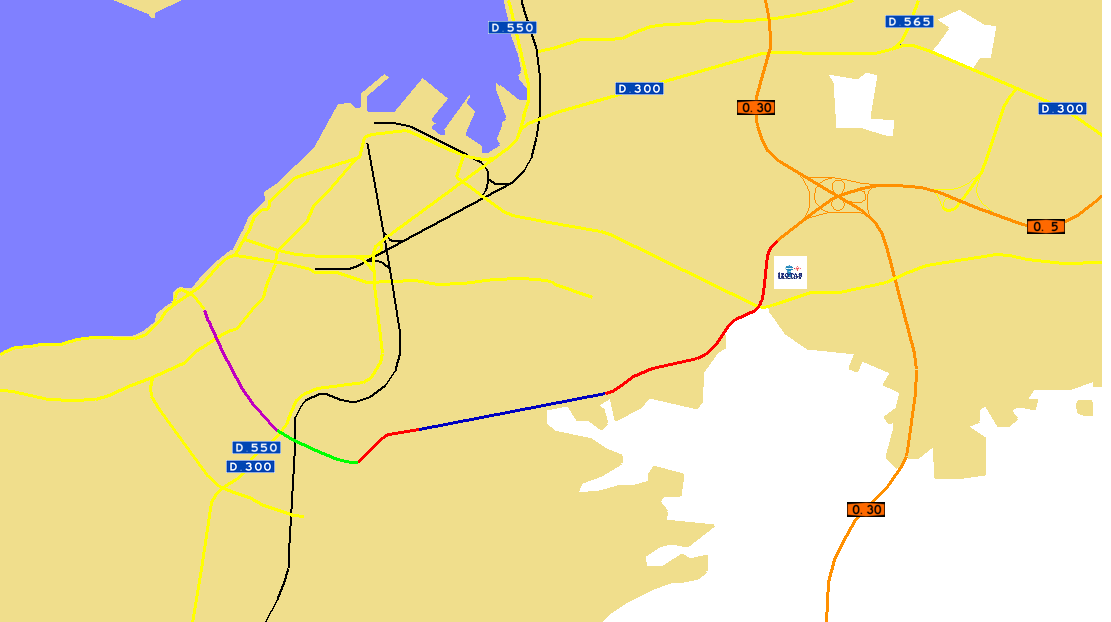
- Homeros Blvd (green & red) together with the Buca-Bornova (blue) and Konak (purple) tunnels. Other main roads are in yellow, motorways are in orange. (Click to enlarge)
- Interactive map of Homeros Boulevard
- Native name: Homeros Bulvarı (Turkish)
- Namesake: Homer
- Owner: City of İzmir
- Maintained by: İzmir Metropolitan Municipality
- Length: 8 km (5.0 mi)
- Location: Buca, Konak and Bornova, İzmir
- West end: D.300 D.550 in Yeşildere

- East end: O-5 in Bornova

Construction
- Construction start: 2011
- Inauguration: 14 December 2013

Homeros Boulevard (Turkish: Homeros Bulvarı) is a partially completed thoroughfare in İzmir, Turkey. The route is planned to be an 8 km (5.0 mi) long "express route" connecting central Konak to the İzmir Coach Terminal in south Bornova, as well as the O-5 and O-30 motorways. The first section of the boulevard, a 1.3 km (0.81 mi) long section in northwest Buca, opened on 14 December 2013 with an official ceremony. The boulevard was then named Homeros Boulevard after the legendary ancient author who once lived in western Anatolia.

The boulevard starts at the east end of the Konak Tunnel, at a junction with the D.300/D.550 highway, and heads east. This part of the boulevard is elevated on a viaduct that crosses the Meles creek and the İzmir-Eğirdir railway, as well as Menderes Avenue, until joining Onat Avenue at a roundabout intersection. The route was nicknamed flying road (Turkish: Uçanyol) since the viaduct reaches a maximum height of 35 m (115 ft).

The rest of the boulevard is under construction and will pass through the 2.5 km (1.6 mi) long Buca-Bornova Tunnel.

== Pictures ==
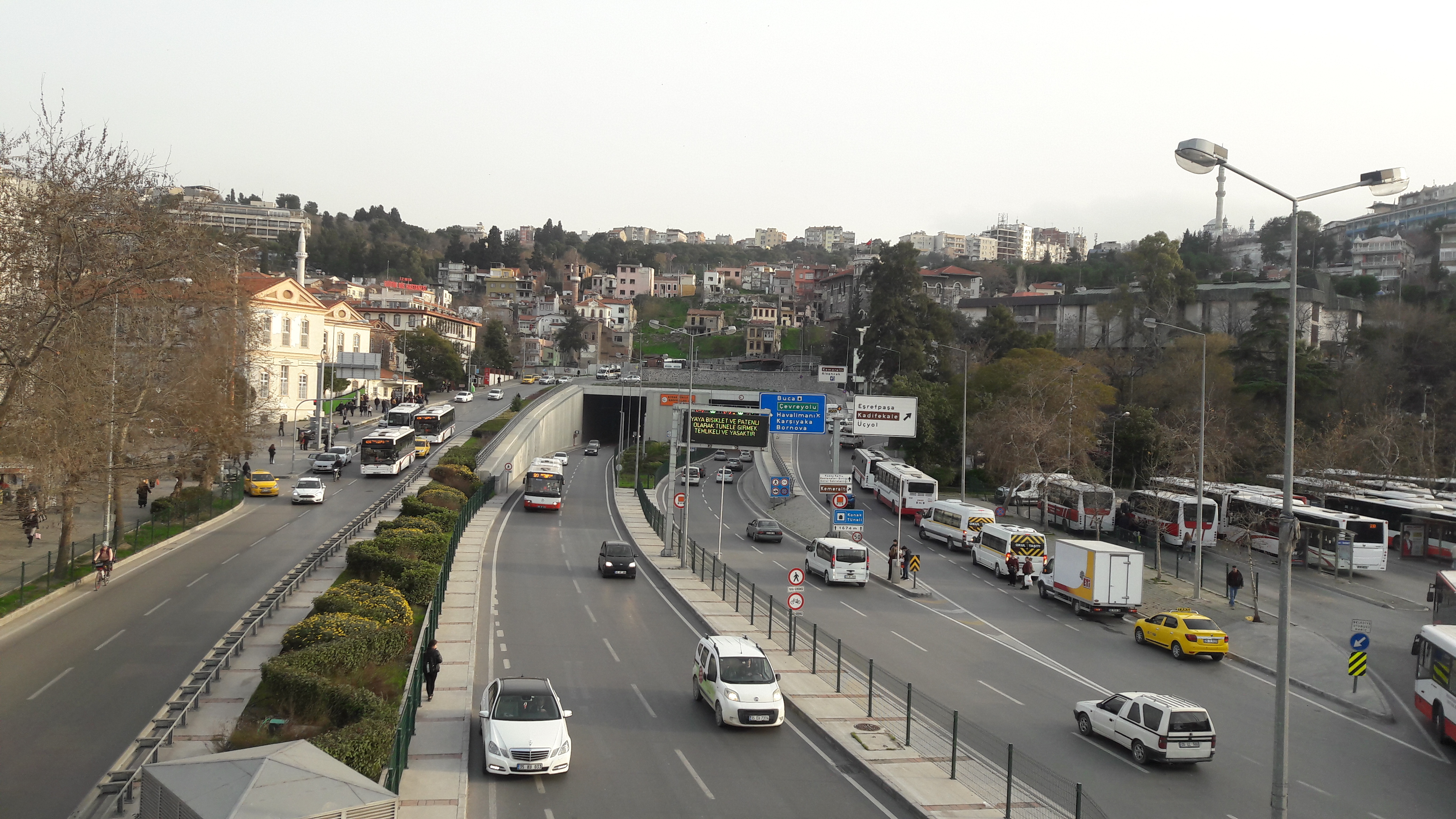
The west end of Homeros Boulevard and the Konak Tunnel in central Konak.

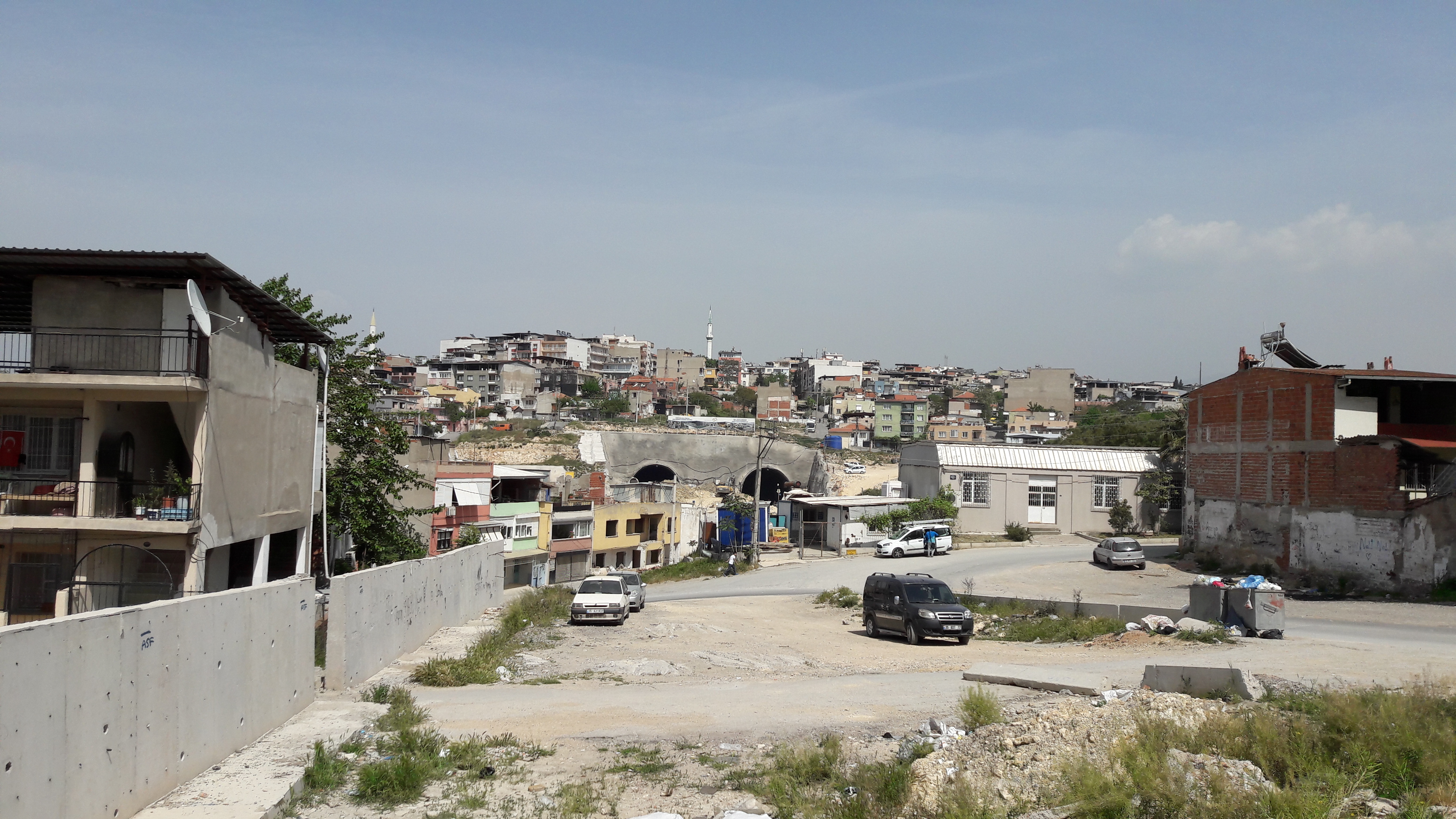
The west portal of the Buca-Bornova Tunnel.

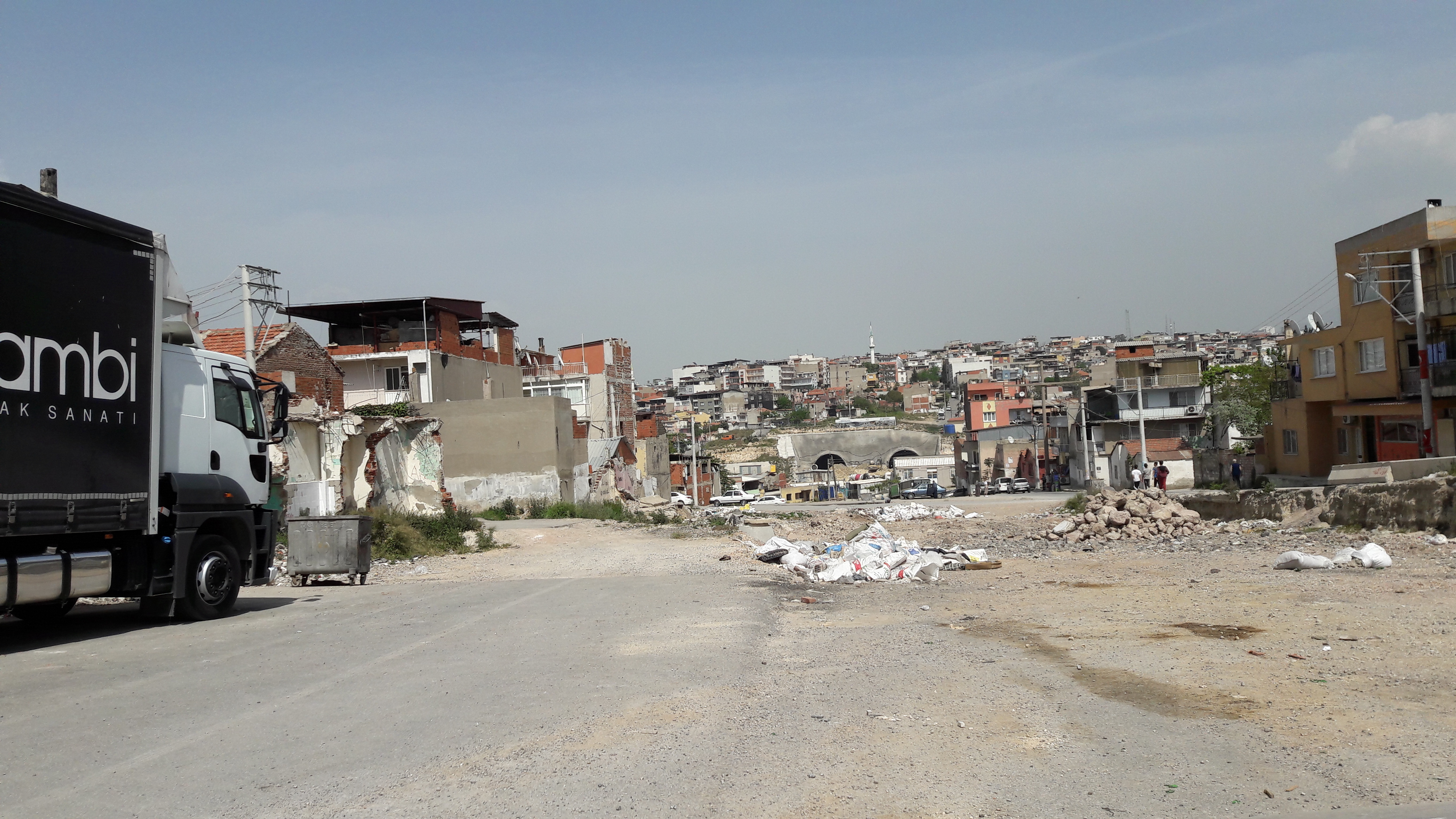
Demolition works of several houses for the construction of the boulevard.
