= Konak Tunnel =

Tunnel in İzmir, Turkey

Konak Tunnel Konak Tüneli
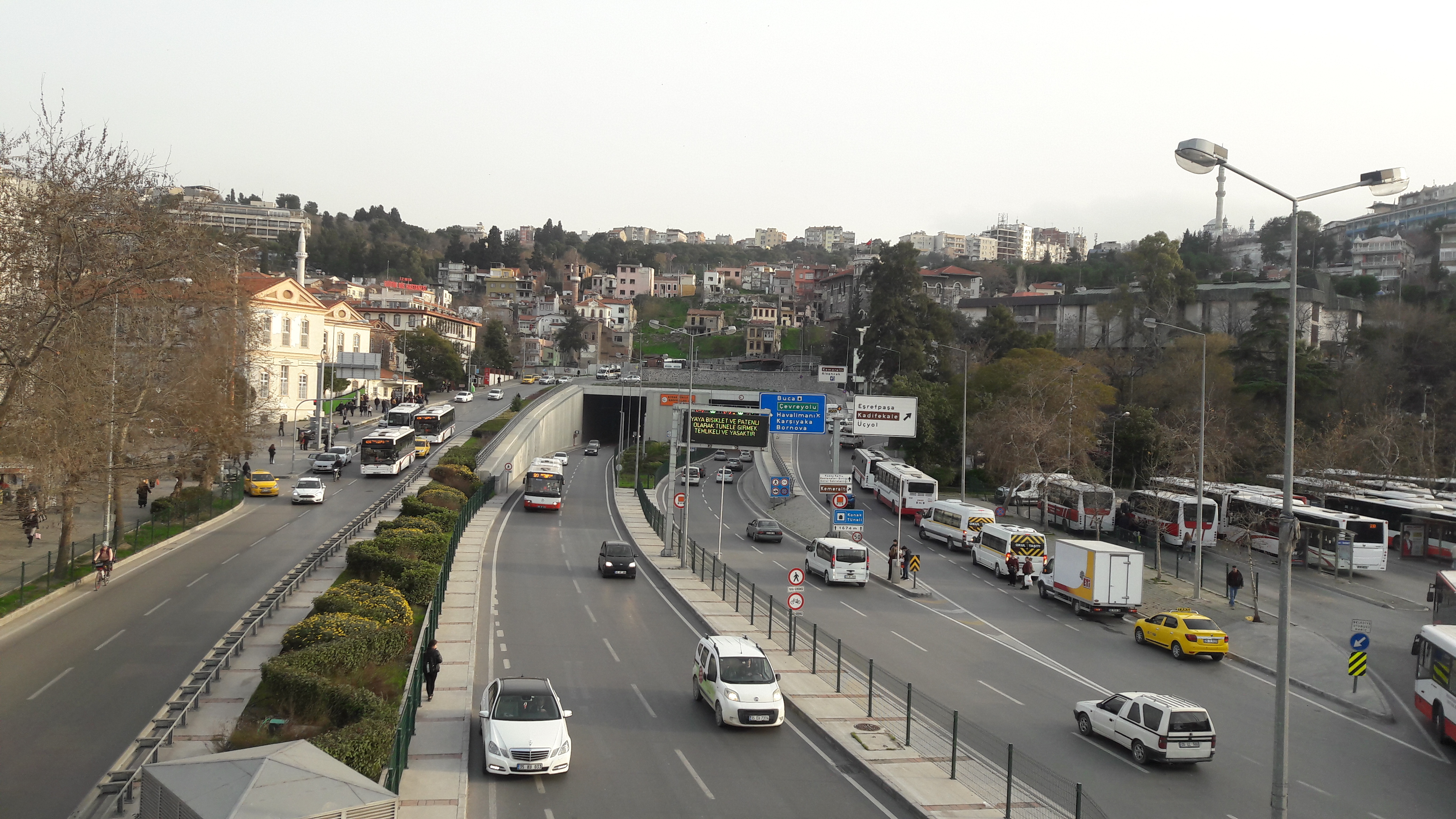
- The Konak (north) portal.
- Interactive map of Konak Tunnel; Konak Tüneli

Overview
- Location: Konak, İzmir Province, Turkey
- Coordinates: 38°24′52″N 27°07′42″E

Operation
- Work began: 23 September 2011
- Opened: 25 May 2015; 11 years ago
- Traffic: 36,422 (daily average, 2017)

Technical
- Length: 1,674 and 1,674 m (5,492 and 5,492 ft)
- No. of lanes: 2 x 2

Location of Konak Tunnel in İzmir

Konak Tunnel (Turkish: Konak Tüneli) is a road tunnel in Konak district of in İzmir Province, Turkey. It was opened to traffic in 2015.

The tunnel is situated in Konak, İzmir connecting the Mustafa Kemal Coastal Boulevard in Konak with Yeşildere Street in Yeşildere neighborhood in the city's south. With the building of the tunnel, the traffic congestion in Konak area was significantly eased. Its construction began on 23 September 2011, and it was opened on 25 May 2015 by Prime minister Ahmet Davutoğlu. It has twin bores in 1,674 m (5,492 ft) length carrying two lanes of traffic in each direction. The middle of the tunnel is at a depth of 100 m (330 ft). The construction cost planned was ₺ 150 million.

Together with the Buca-Bornova Tunnel, the Konak Tunnel is part of a 7 km (4.3 mi) long "express route" that will connect central Konak with the İzmir Coach Terminal in Bornova.
