= Karataş (Tram İzmir) =

LRT station in İzmir, Turkey

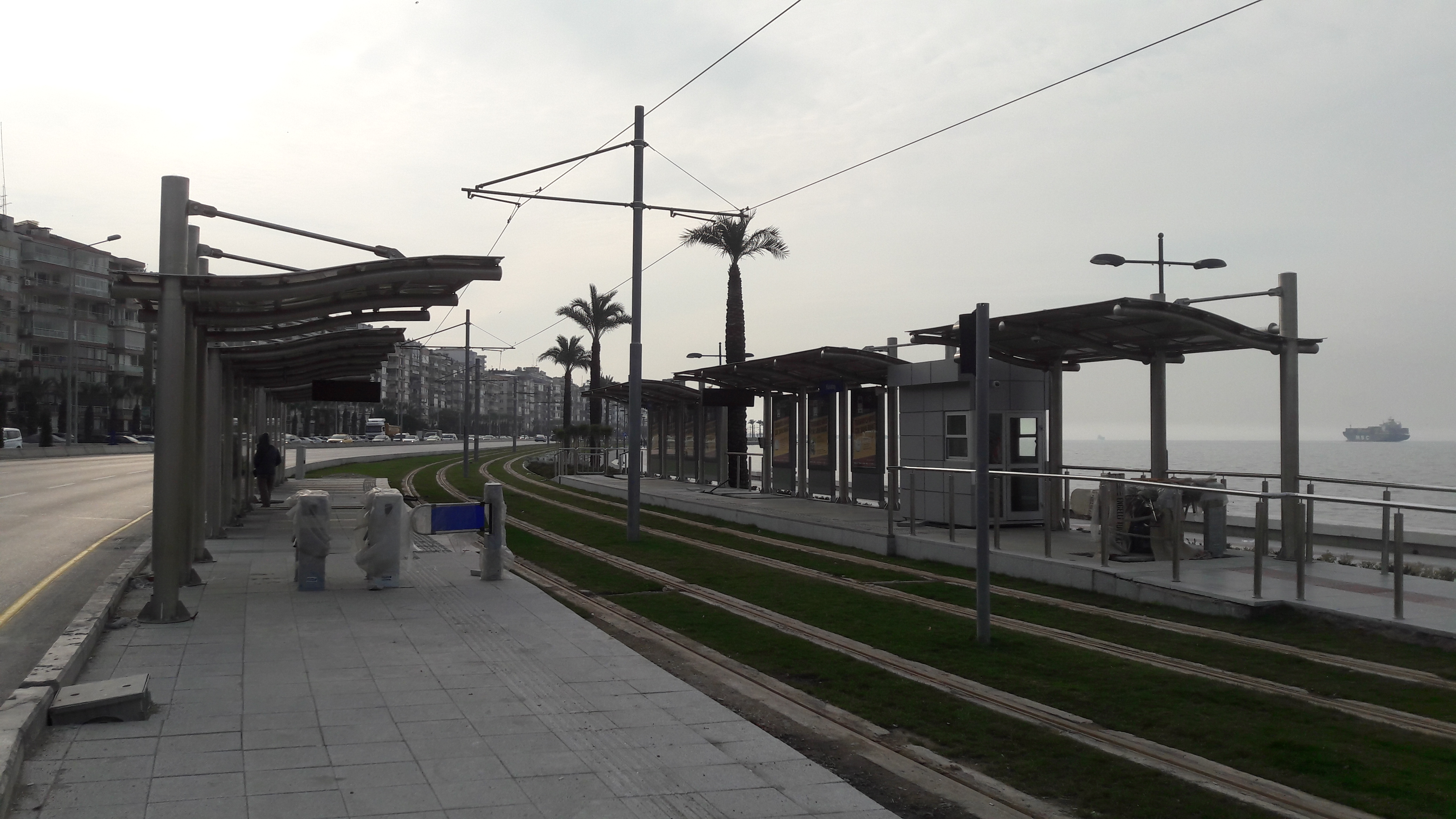
- The station in February 2018

General information
- Location: Mustafa Kemal Sahil Blv., Turgut Reis Mah., 35280; Konak
- Coordinates: 38.4106°N 27.1188°E
- System: Tram İzmir light-rail station
- Owner: İzmir Metropolitan Municipality
- Operator: İzmir Metro A.Ş.
- Line: T2
- Platforms: 2 side platforms
- Tracks: 2

Construction
- Accessible: Yes

History
- Opened: 24 March 2018
- Electrified: 750V DC OHLE

Services
Preceding station	Tram İzmir	Following station
Karantina towards Fahrettin Altay	T2	Konak İskele towards Halkapınar
Location

Karataş is a light-rail station on the Konak Tram of the Tram İzmir system in İzmir, Turkey. It is located along the Mustafa Kemal Coastal Boulevard in Karataş, Konak. The station consists of two side platforms serving two tracks.

Karataş station opened on 24 March 2018.

== Nearby places of interest ==
- Asansör - a historical elevator tower
