= Altındağ (disambiguation) =

Altındağ is part of the city of Ankara, Turkey.

Altındağ may also refer to:

- Altındağ, İzmir, a zone of Bornova district, İzmir, Turkey
  - Altındağ (İzmir Metro), a proposed metro station in that zone
- Tevfik Altındağ (born 1988), German footballer of Turkish descent

== See also ==
- Altyn-Tagh, a mountain range in northwestern China
