= Buca Onat Tunnel =

Tunnel in İzmir, Turkey

Buca Onat Tunnel Buca Onat Tüneli
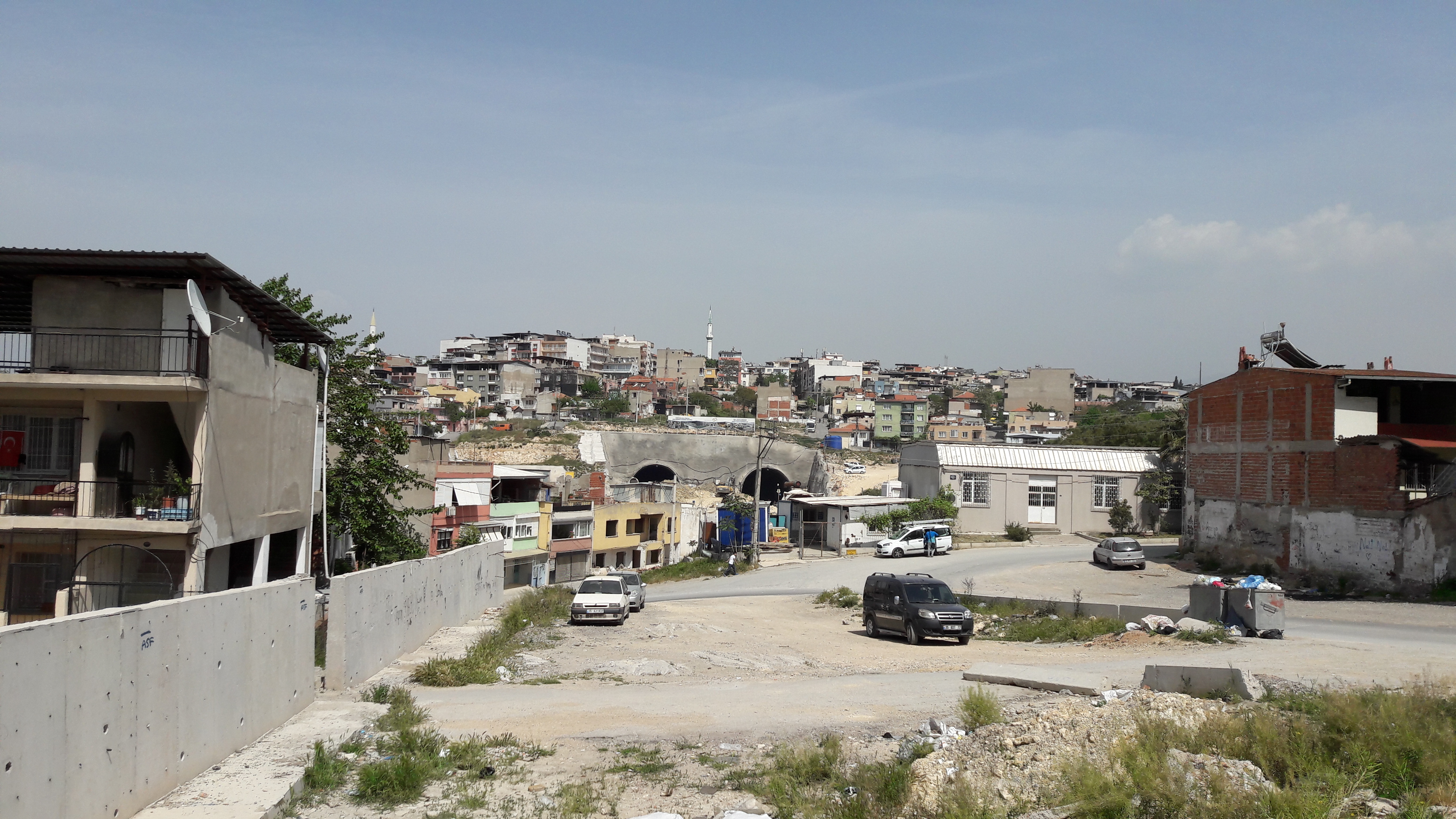
- The west portal of the tunnel (Buca) with demolition works for Homeros Boulevard in the foreground.
- Interactive map of Buca Onat Tunnel; Buca Onat Tüneli

Overview
- Location: Buca and Bornova, İzmir
- Coordinates: 38°24′29″N 27°10′21″E
- Status: Under construction

Operation
- Work began: 12 March 2018
- Owner: İzmir Metropolitan Municipality
- Traffic: automotive

Technical
- Length: 2,503 and 2,508 m (8,212 and 8,228 ft)
- No. of lanes: 2 x 2
- Max elevation: 70 m (230 ft)

Location of Buca Onat Tunnel in İzmir

The Buca Onat Tunnel (Turkish: Buca Onat Tüneli) is the name of the 2.5-kilometre-long (1.6 mi) tunnel, currently under construction, in İzmir, Turkey. The tunnel is part of a 7-kilometre-long (4.3 mi) express route that will connect the İzmir Coach Terminal, in Bornova, to central Konak, via the Konak Tunnel. Once completed, the tunnel will become the longest tunnel in the İzmir Province and the 14th longest in Turkey. Work began on 12 March 2018 and the estimated construction cost is ₺184 million.
