= Karantina (Tram İzmir) =

LRT station in İzmir, Turkey

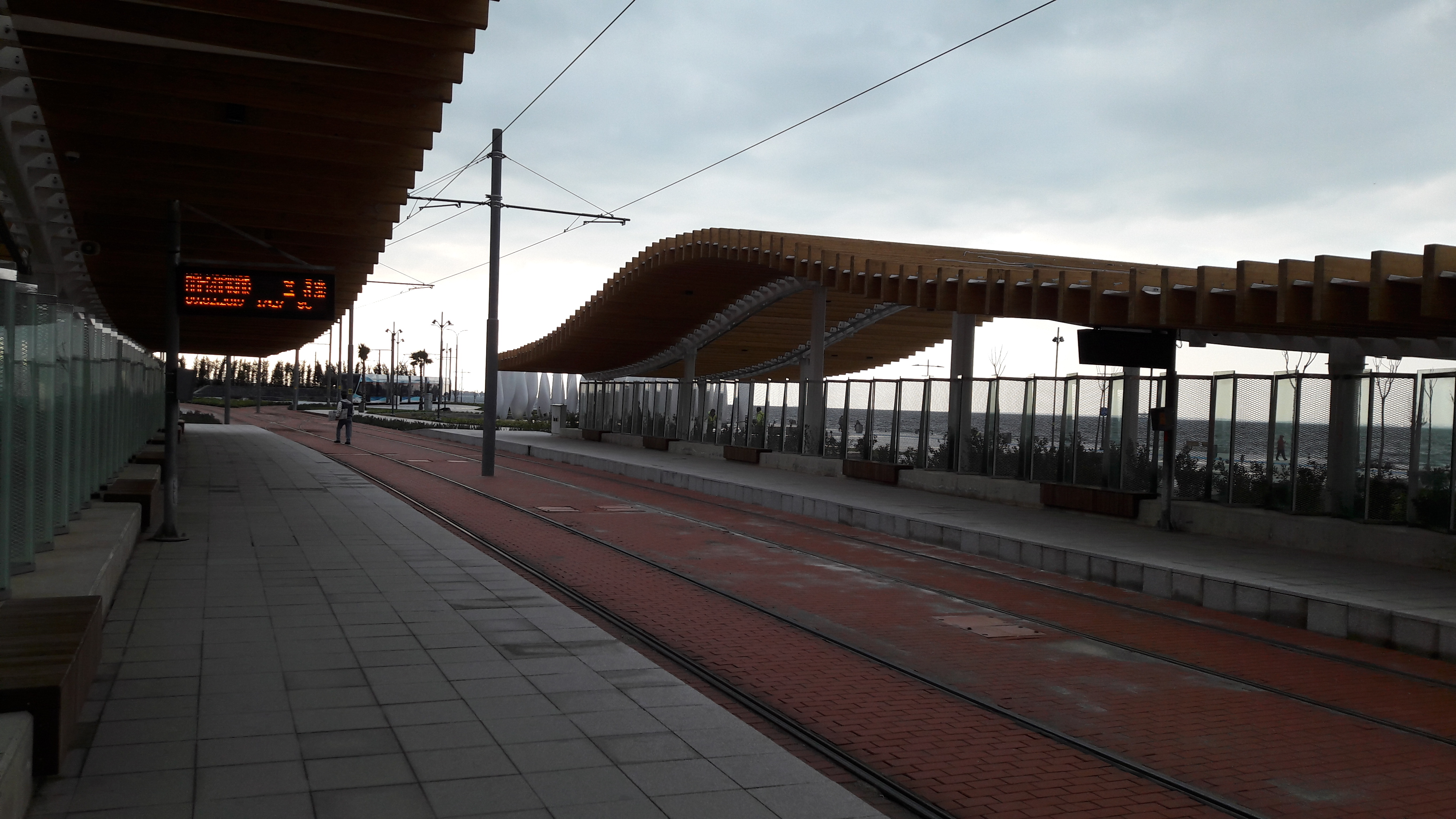

General information
- Location: 15 Temmuz Demokrasi Şehitleri Meydanı, Mithatpaşa Mah. 35280; Konak
- Coordinates: 38.4080°N 27.1047°E
- System: Tram İzmir light-rail station
- Owner: İzmir Metropolitan Municipality
- Operator: İzmir Metro A.Ş.
- Line: T2
- Platforms: 2 side platforms, 320 millimetres (13 in) height
- Tracks: 2
- Connections: İzdeniz at Karantina Pier

Construction
- Accessible: Yes

History
- Opened: 13 May 2018
- Electrified: 750V DC OHLE

Services
Preceding station	Tram İzmir	Following station
Köprü towards Fahrettin Altay	T2	Karataş towards Halkapınar
Location

Karantina is a light rail station on the Konak Tram line in İzmir, Turkey. It is located within the 15 Temmuz Demkorasi Şehitleri Square in east Konak, above the Mustafa Kemal Coastal Boulevard as the throughway passes underneath the square. The station was originally named Mithatpaşa Lisesi from the historic Mithatpaşa high-school, located one block south of the station.

== Nearby places of interest ==
- Mithatpaşa high-school - a historic high-school built in the late 19th century
- 15 July Democracy Martyrs Square - the square around the station
