= Köprü (Tram İzmir) =

LRT station in İzmir, Turkey

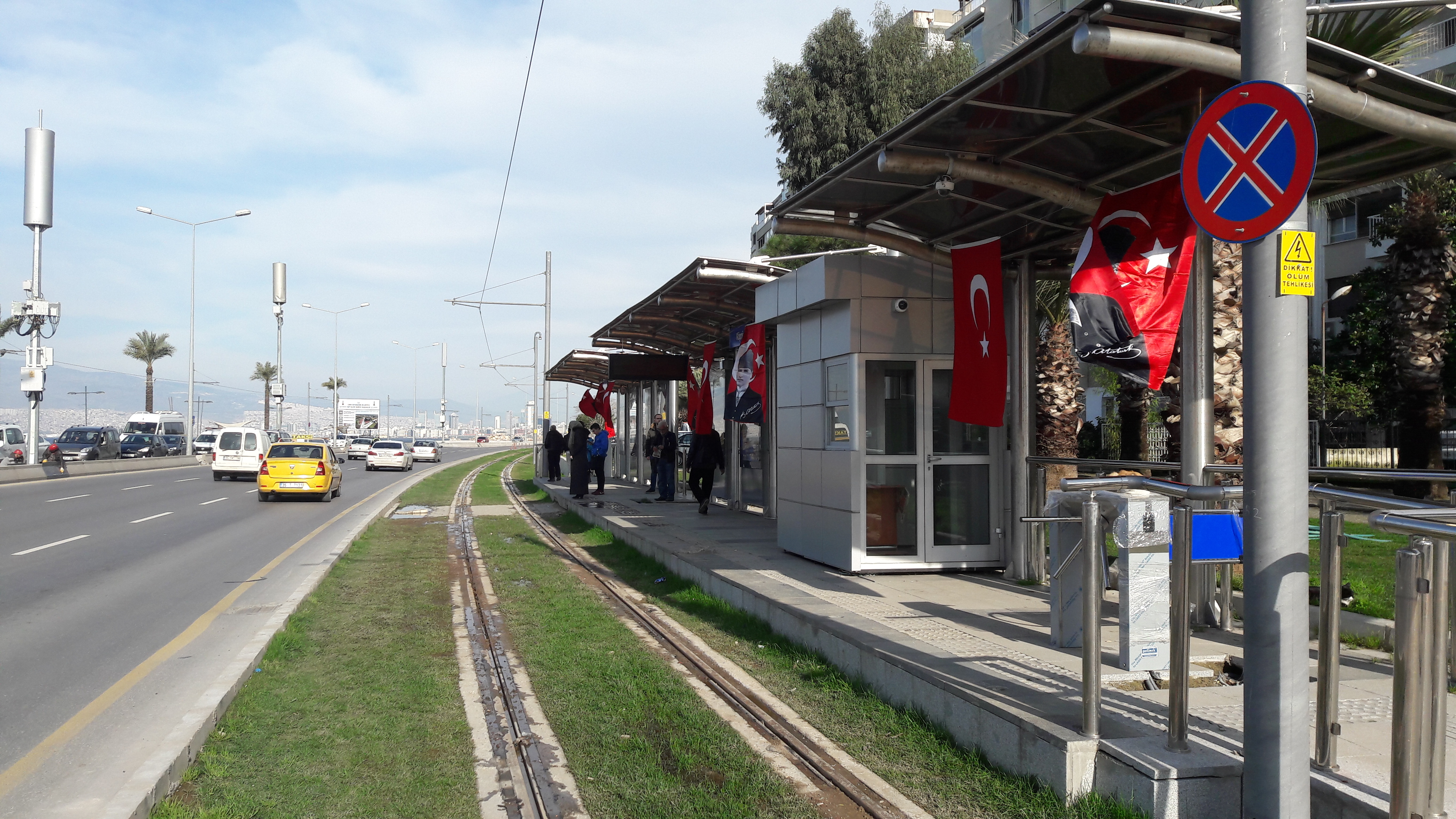
- The northbound platform in February 2018.

General information
- Location: Mustafa Kemal Sahil Blv., Çankaya Mah., 35280; Konak
- Coordinates: 38.4058°N 27.0984°E
- System: Tram İzmir light-rail station
- Owner: İzmir Metropolitan Municipality
- Operator: İzmir Metro A.Ş.
- Line: T2
- Platforms: 2 side platforms
- Tracks: 2

Construction
- Accessible: Yes

History
- Opened: 24 March 2018
- Electrified: 750V DC OHLE

Services
Preceding station	Tram İzmir	Following station
Sadıkbey towards Fahrettin Altay	T2	Karantina towards Halkapınar
Location

Köprü is a station on the Konak Tram line in İzmir, Turkey. It is located along the Mustafa Kemal Coastal Boulevard in west Konak. The station consists of two side platforms, one on each side of the boulevard.

Köprü station opened on 24 March 2018.

== Nearby Places of Interest ==
- Mithatpaşa high-school - A historic high-school built in the late 19th century.
