= Merih =

Merih is a Turkish gender neutral unisex given name. It refers to the planet Mars. Notable people with the name are as follows:

- Merih Demiral (born 1998), Turkish football player
- Merih Karaaslan (1949–2002), Turkish architect
- Merih Sezen (1919–2011), Turkish Olympic fencer
