= Altındağ (İzmir Metro) =

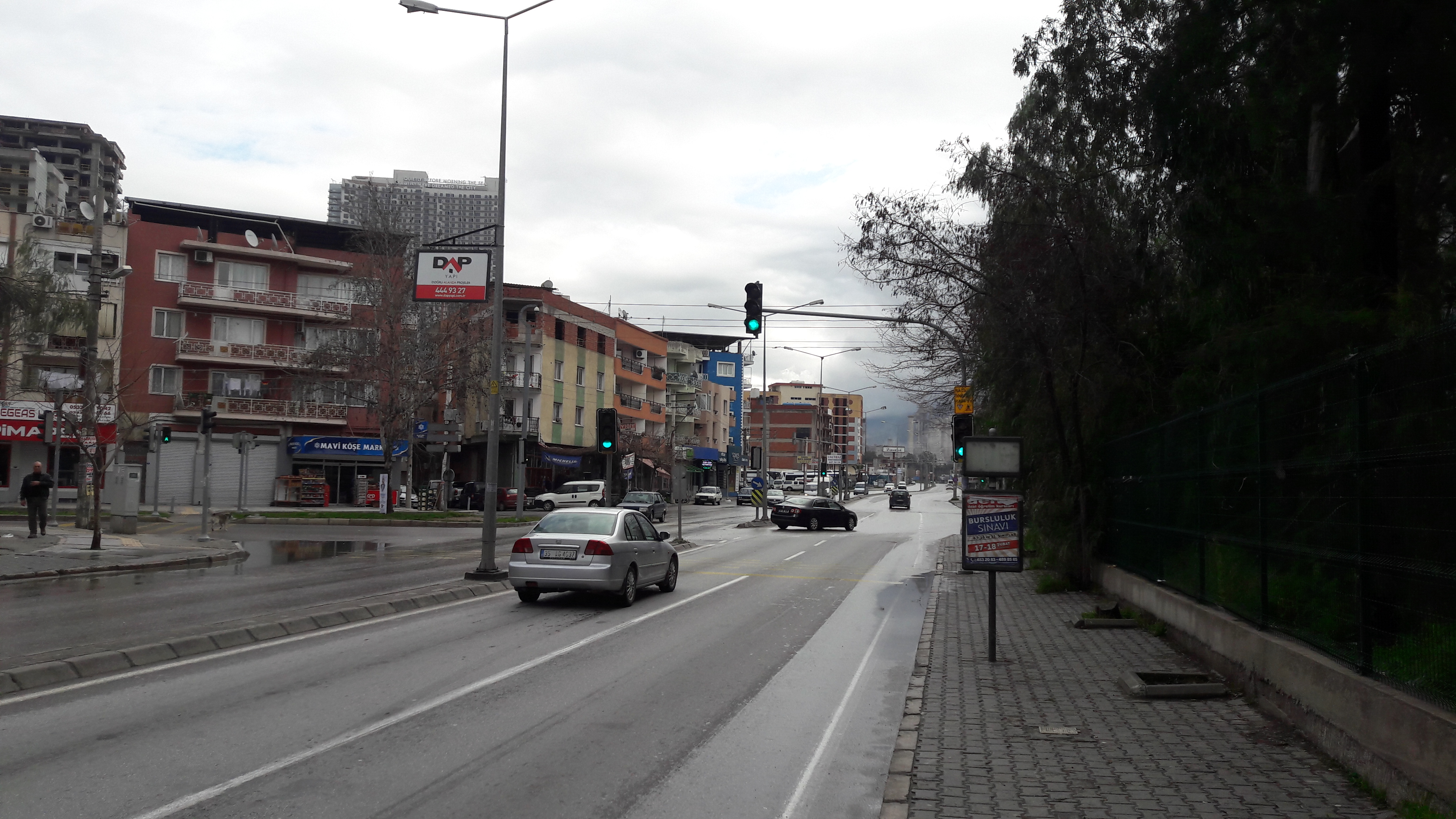
- The proposed location of Altındağ station.

General information
- Location: Kamil Tunca Cd., Yeşilova Mah., 35080; Bornova
- Coordinates: 38.4294°N 27.2030°E
- System: İzmir Metro rapid transit station
- Owner: İzmir Metropolitan Municipality
- Operator: İzmir Metro A.Ş.
- Line: 2 Alt
- Platforms: 1 island platform
- Tracks: 2

Construction
- Accessible: Yes

History
- Opened: 2020 (Expected)

Services
Preceding station	İzmir Metro	Following station
Future service
Çamdibi towards Halkapınar	M5	Otogar Terminus
Location

Altındağ is a proposed underground station on the M5 Line of the İzmir Metro. It will be located beneath Kamil Tunca Avenue in the southern Bornova. Construction of the station, along with the metro line, is scheduled to begin in 2018.

Altındağ station is expected to open in 2020.
