= Bayraklı railway station =

Bayraklı
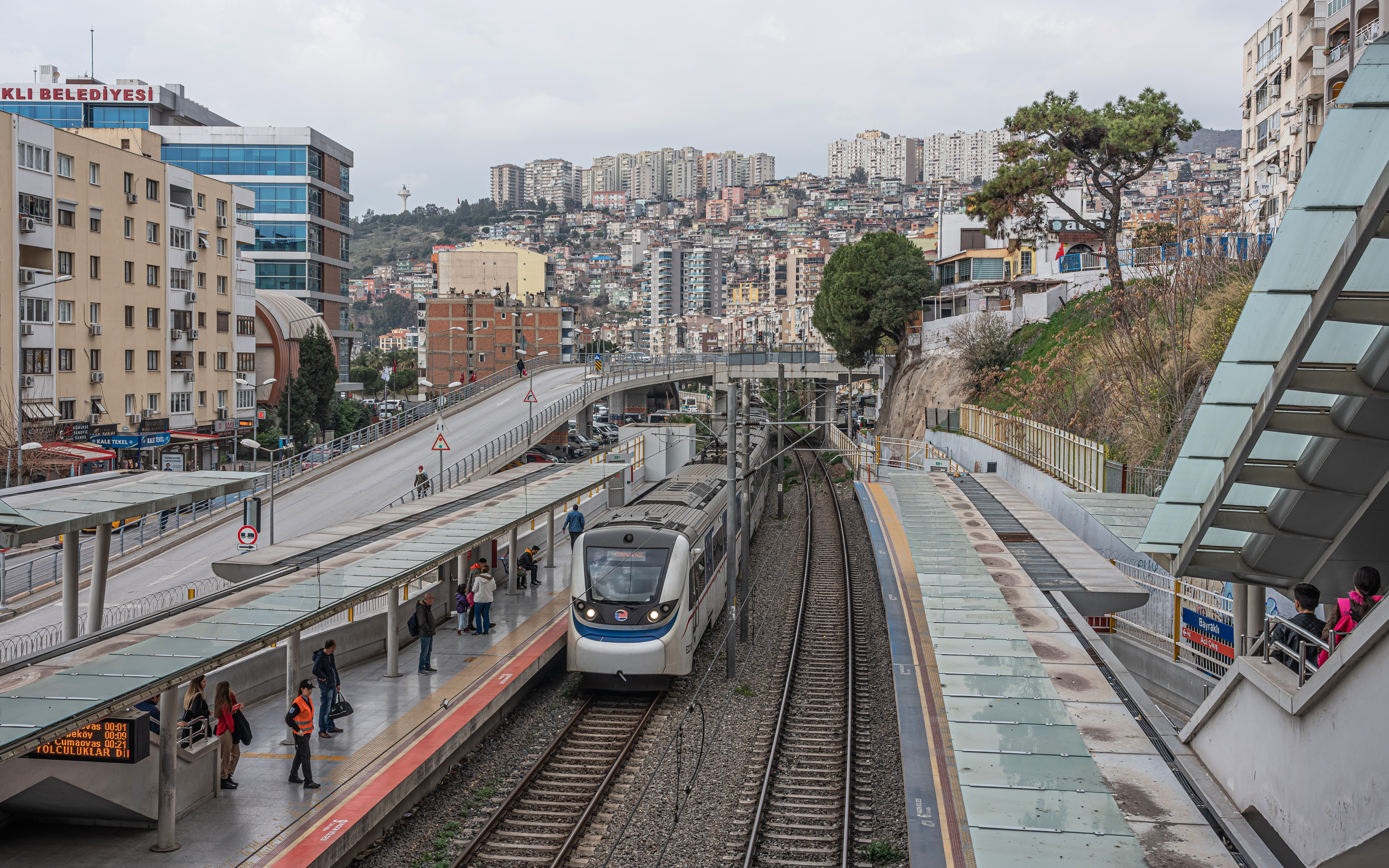

General information
- Location: Anadolu Cd., Bayraklı Mah. 35530; Bayraklı, İzmir; Turkey
- Coordinates: 38.4638°N 27.1644°E
- System: İZBAN commuter rail station
- Owner: Turkish State Railways
- Operator: TCDD Transport; İZBAN A.Ş.
- Line: İZBAN Line
- Platforms: 2 side platforms
- Tracks: 2
- Connections: ESHOT Bus: 77, 78, 125, 140, 147, 148, 240, 335, 426, 434, 477, 557, 577

Construction
- Structure type: At-grade
- Parking: No
- Cycle facilities: No
- Accessible: Yes

History
- Opened: 10 October 1865
- Closed: 2006–10
- Rebuilt: 2006–08
- Electrified: 2001; 25 kV AC, 50 Hz

Services
Preceding station	İZBAN	Following station
Salhane towards Cumaovası	Aliağa-Cumaovası	Turan towards Aliağa
Salhane towards Tepeköy	Menemen-Tepeköy	Turan towards Menemen
Salhane towards Tepeköy	Aliağa-Tepeköy (Late nights)	Turan towards Aliağa
Former services
Preceding station	Turkish State Railways	Following station
Salhane towards İzmir (Basmane)	Çiğli suburban	Turan towards Çiğli
Location

Bayraklı railway station (Turkish: Bayraklı istasyonu) is a railway station in central Bayraklı, İzmir. İZBAN operates commuter trains north to Aliağa and Menemen and south to Cumaovası and Tepeköy. The station consists of two side platforms serving two bi-directional tracks. An overhead mezzanine serves as both an overpass and ticket control area.

Bayraklı station was originally opened on 10 October 1865 by the Smyrna Cassaba Railway.

== Connections ==
ESHOT Bus service
Route number	Stop	Route	Location
77	Bayraklı İstasyon	Nafiz Gürman — Halkapınar Metro 2	Anadolu Street
78	Bayraklı İstasyon	Yamanlar — Halkapınar Metro 2	Anadolu Street
125	Bayraklı İstasyon	Mustafa Kemal Mah. — Halkapınar Metro 2	Anadolu Street
140	Bayraklı İstasyon	Örnekköy — Halkapınar Metro 2	Anadolu Street
147	Bayraklı İstasyon	Postacı — Halkapınar Metro 2	Anadolu Street
148	Bayraklı İstasyon	Onur Mah — Halkapınar Metro 2	Anadolu Street
240	Bayraklı İstasyon	Zübeyde Hanım Mah. — Halkapınar Metro 2	Anadolu Street
335	Bayraklı İstasyon	Doğançay — Halkapınar Metro 2	Anadolu Street
426	Bayraklı İstasyon	Mustafa Kemal Mah. — Halkapınar Metro 2	Anadolu Street
434	Bayraklı İstasyon	Körfez Mahallesi — Halkapınar Metro 2	Anadolu Street
477	Bayraklı İstasyon	Nafiz Gürman — Halkapınar Metro 2	Anadolu Street
557	Bayraklı İstasyon	Bayraklı Toplu Konutlar — Bayraklı İZBAN	Anadolu Street
577	Bayraklı İstasyon	Nafiz Gürman — Halkapınar Metro 2	Anadolu Street
