= Salhane railway station =

Railway station in Bayraklı, İzmir, Turkey

Salhane
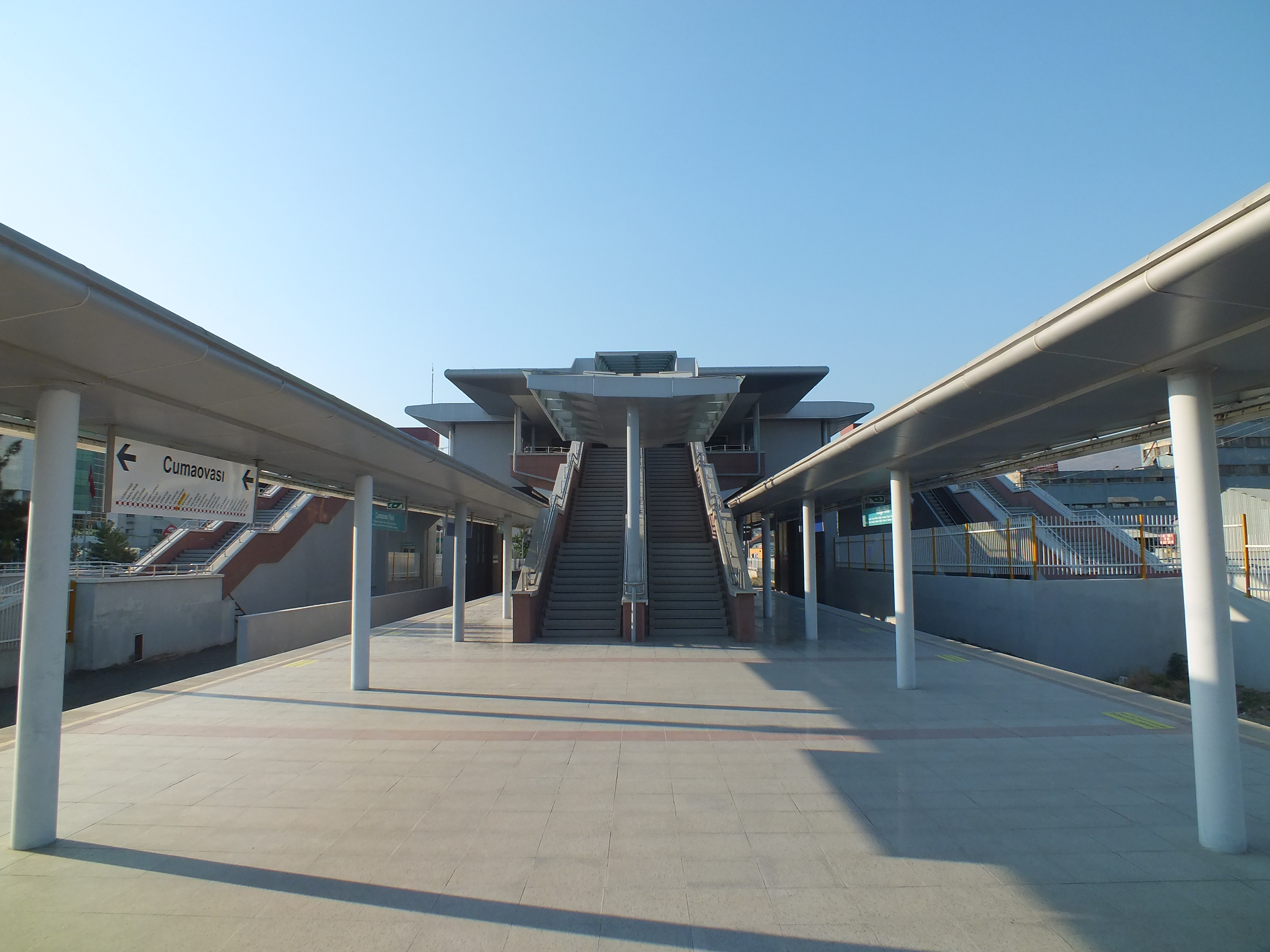
- Looking north at the staircase.

General information
- Location: Ozan Albay Cd., Adalet Mah., 35530; Bayraklı, İzmir; Turkey
- Coordinates: 38.4506°N 27.1722°E
- System: İZBAN commuter rail station
- Owner: Turkish State Railways
- Operator: TCDD Taşımacılık; İZBAN A.Ş.
- Line: İZBAN Line
- Platforms: 1 island platform
- Tracks: 3
- Connections: ESHOT Bus: Salhane Aktarma Merkezi: 328, 338, 359, 539; Salhane İş Merkezi: 77, 78, 125, 140, 147, 148, 240, 335, 426, 434, 477, 577

Construction
- Parking: No
- Cycle facilities: No
- Accessible: Yes

History
- Opened: 2001
- Closed: 2006-10
- Rebuilt: 2007-08

Services
Preceding station	İZBAN	Following station
Halkapınar towards Cumaovası	Aliağa-Cumaovası	Bayraklı towards Aliağa
Halkapınar towards Tepeköy	Menemen-Tepeköy	Bayraklı towards Menemen
Halkapınar towards Tepeköy	Aliağa-Tepeköy (Late nights)	Bayraklı towards Aliağa
Former services
Preceding station	Turkish State Railways	Following station
Çınarlı towards İzmir (Basmane)	Çiğli suburban	Bayraklı towards Çiğli
Location

Salhane is a railway station in İzmir. İZBAN operates commuter trains north to Aliağa and Menemen and south to Cumaovası and Tepeköy. Salhane opened in 2001, and was serviced by the Basmane-Aliağa Regional and the Alsancak-Çiğli Commuter Line. Service was suspended between 2006 and 2010, where the station was rebuilt. Service re-opened on December 5, 2010.

== Connections ==
ESHOT Bus service
Route number	Stop	Route	Location
77	Salhane İş Merkezi	Nafiz Gürman — Halkapınar Metro 2	Anadolu Street
78	Salhane İş Merkezi	Yamanlar — Halkapınar Metro 2	Anadolu Street
125	Salhane İş Merkezi	Mustafa Kemal Mah. — Halkapınar Metro 2	Anadolu Street
140	Salhane İş Merkezi	Örnekköy — Halkapınar Metro 2	Anadolu Street
147	Salhane İş Merkezi	Postacı — Halkapınar Metro 2	Anadolu Street
148	Salhane İş Merkezi	Onur Mah — Halkapınar Metro 2	Anadolu Street
240	Salhane İş Merkezi	Zübeyde Hanım Mah. — Halkapınar Metro 2	Anadolu Street
328	Salhane Aktarma Merkezi	Bornova Metro — Salhane Aktarma Merkezi	Ozan Abay Street
335	Salhane İş Merkezi	Doğançay — Halkapınar Metro 2	Anadolu Street
338	Salhane Aktarma Merkezi	Bornova Metro — Salhane Aktarma Merkezi	Ozan Abay Street
359	Salhane Aktarma Merkezi	R. Şevket İnce Mah. — Salhane Aktarma Merkezi	Ozan Abay Street
426	Salhane İş Merkezi	Mustafa Kemal Mah. — Halkapınar Metro 2	Anadolu Street
434	Salhane İş Merkezi	Körfez Mahallesi — Halkapınar Metro 2	Anadolu Street
477	Salhane İş Merkezi	Nafiz Gürman — Halkapınar Metro 2	Anadolu Street
539	Salhane Aktarma Merkezi	Yenitepe Evleri — Salhane Aktarma Merkezi	Ozan Abay Street
577	Salhane İş Merkezi	Nafiz Gürman — Halkapınar Metro 2	Anadolu Street

== Nearby places of interest ==
- İzmir Courthouse
- Folkart Towers
- Ege Perla
