= Çınarlı railway station =

Abandoned train station in İzmir, Turkiye

ÇINARLI

General information
- Location: 1561 Sk., Çınarlı Mah., 35170; Konak, İzmir; Turkey
- Coordinates: 38.4399°N 27.1733°E
- Owner: Turkish State Railways
- Platforms: 2 side platforms
- Tracks: 2

History
- Closed: 2001
Former services
Preceding station	Turkish State Railways	Following station
Halkapınar towards İzmir (Basmane)	Çiğli suburban	Salhane towards Çiğli
Location

Çınarlı railway station was a station in İzmir, Turkey, abandoned in 2001. It was serviced by suburban trains from Basmane station to Çiğli. The station was located at a former grade crossing of 1561 Street, just northeast of Halkapınar station and consisted of two side platforms. The station was closed down in 2001 and demolished shortly after. Salhane station, located about 1 km (0.62 mi) north, was opened in the same year as a replacement for Çınarlı. The southbound platform site was used for the construction of a new third track, to allow freight trains from the Port of İzmir to enter the railway further north.
