= Üniversite (Tram İzmir) =

LRT station in İzmir, Turkey

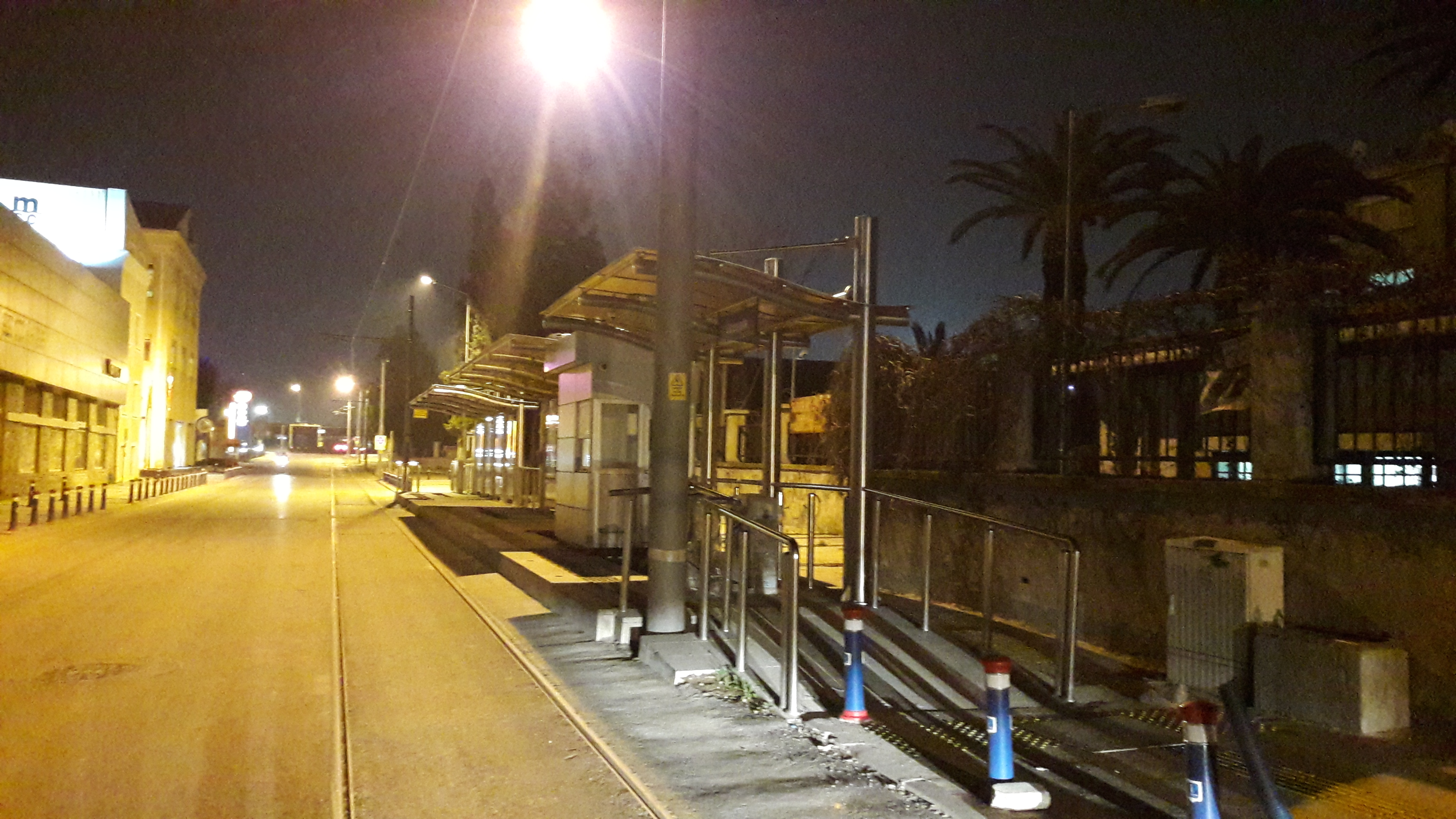
- The station in February 2018.

General information
- Location: Şehitler Cd., Umurbey Mah., 35230; Konak
- Coordinates: 38.4372°N 27.1606°E
- System: Tram İzmir light-rail station
- Owner: İzmir Metropolitan Municipality
- Operator: İzmir Metro A.Ş.
- Line: T2
- Platforms: 1 side platform
- Tracks: 1

Construction
- Accessible: Yes

History
- Opened: 24 March 2018
- Electrified: 750V DC OHLE

Services
Preceding station	Tram İzmir	Following station
Alsancak Stadyumu towards Fahrettin Altay	T2	Halkapınar Terminus
Location

Üniversite is a light-rail station on the Konak Tram of the Tram İzmir system in İzmir, Turkey. Originally named Eğitim Sitesi, it is located along Şehitler Avenue and consists of a side platform and one track. Only Halkapınar-bound (Eastbound) trams stop at Üniversite, since westbound trams travel along Liman Avenue one block north. The station gets its name from the Nevvar Salih İşgören High School, located next to the station.

The station opened on 24 March 2018.
