= M5 (İzmir Metro) =

Planned railway line in İzmir, Turkey

Halkapınar—Otogar Line
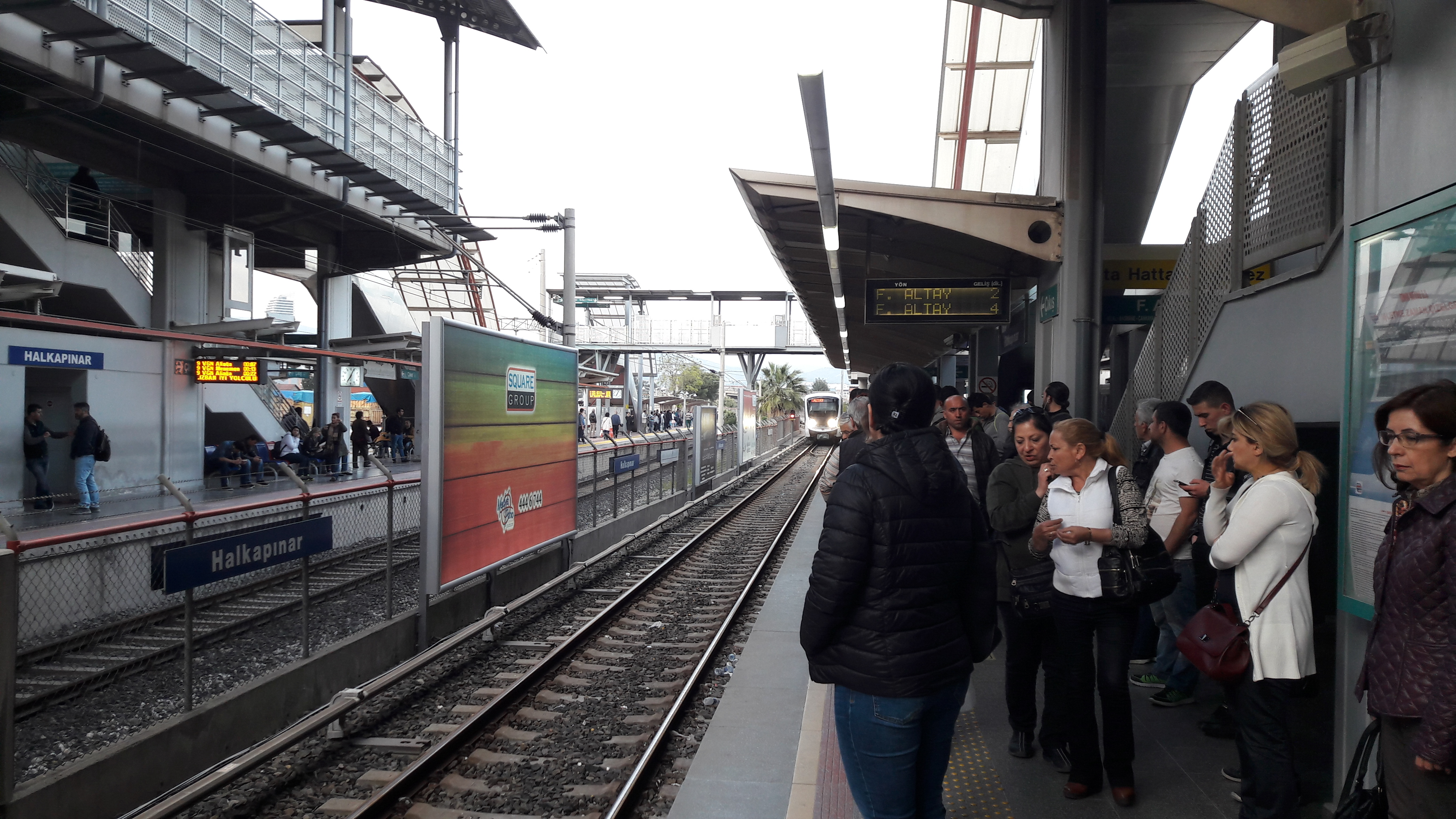
- The western terminus of the line, Halkapınar Transfer Center.

Overview
- Native name: Halkapınar—Otogar Hattı
- Status: Planned
- Owner: Turkish State Railways
- Locale: İzmir, Turkey
- Termini: Halkapınar, Konak (West); Otogar, Bornova (East)
- Stations: 5

Service
- Type: Commuter rail
- System: İZBAN
- Operator(s): İZBAN A.Ş.
- Depot(s): Alsancak

Technical
- Line length: 4.5 km (2.8 mi)
- Character: S-Bahn
- Track gauge: 1,435 mm (4 ft 8 1/2 in) standard gauge
- Loading gauge: TCDD gross gauge
- Minimum radius: 210 metres (689 ft 0 in)
- Electrification: 25 kV AC
- Operating speed: 80 km/h (50 mph)
- Signalling: CBTC

The Halkapınar—Otogar Line (Turkish: Halkapınar—Otogar Hattı) is a planned urban commuter railway line in İzmir, Turkey. The line has a total length of 4.5 km (2.8 mi) and would begin at Halkapınar Transfer Center and run southeast along Kamil Tunca Boulevard to the İzmir Bus Terminal (Turkish: Otogar). Construction of the line was approved in May 2017, and is expected to begin in December 2017 or January 2018. It was previously planned as a subway but revised in 2018 to be constructed as a commuter railway.

== Overview ==
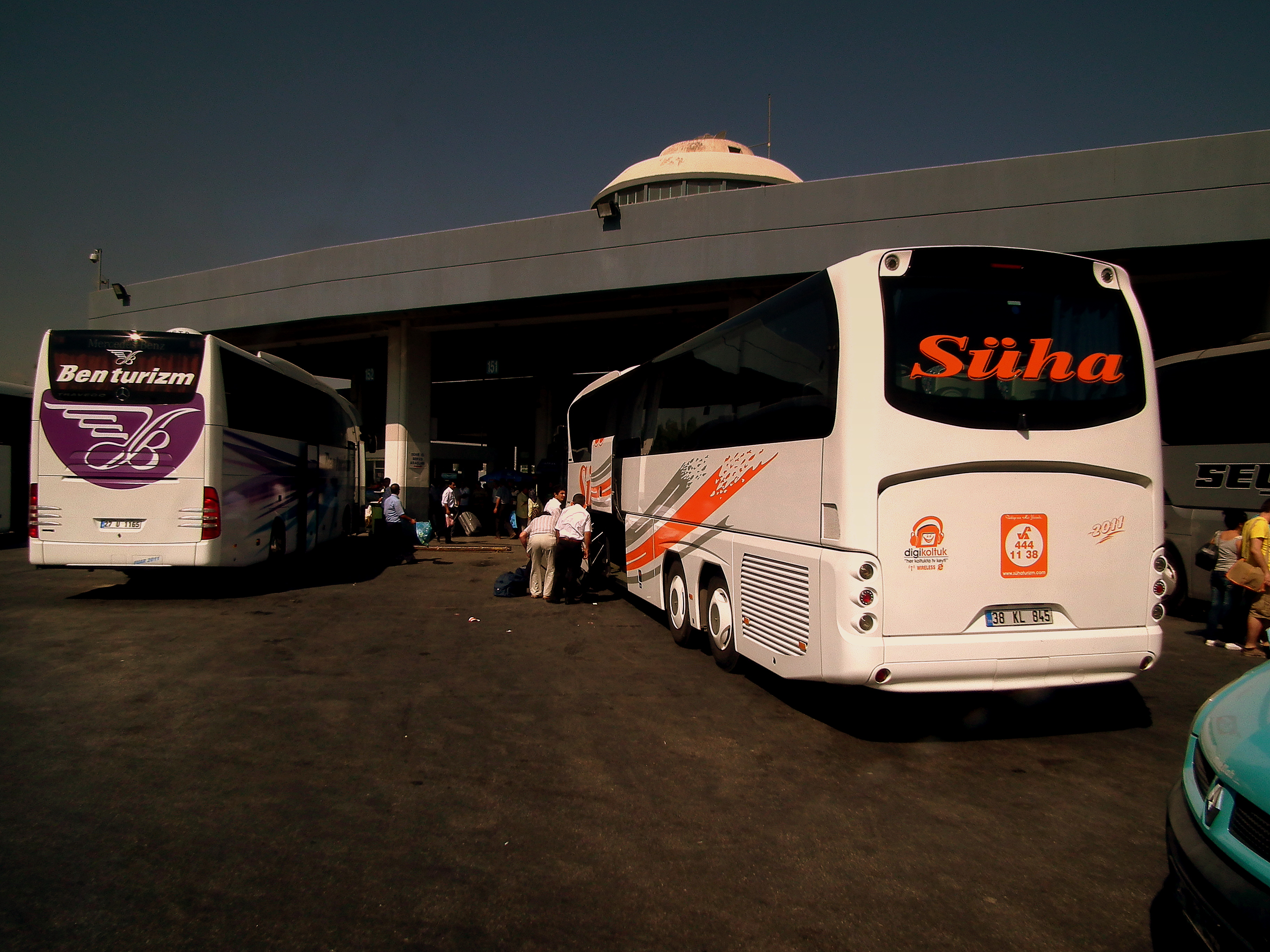
The eastern terminus of the line, İzmir Coach Terminal.

The Halkapınar—Otogar Line was originally planned in 2005 by the İzmir Metropolitan Municipality. The line was planned to diverge from the M1 Line at Halkapınar and run underneath Kamil Tunca Boulevard to the İzmir Bus Terminal. Since Kamil Tunca Boulevard was built on an old railway branch, the land was still owned by the Turkish State Railways. The city municipality bought the land for 22 million YTL (appr. 18.8 million USD at the time) and finalized plans. However construction was later halted by the Ministry of Transport which later acquired the project from the city.

The Ministry of Transport re-planned the line to include it within the Ankara-İzmir high-speed railway, on which construction began in 2013. The ministry included the Halkapınar—Otogar line within their 2014-17 budget and in April 2017 submitted the project for an environmental impact report, which was completed in May. The route of the line remained the same but will be constructed together with a heavy rail line. A total of four new stations will be built. These stations are: Vakıflar, Çamdibi, Altındağ and Otogar.

== See also ==
- Ankara-İzmir high-speed railway
