= Otogar (İzmir Metro) =

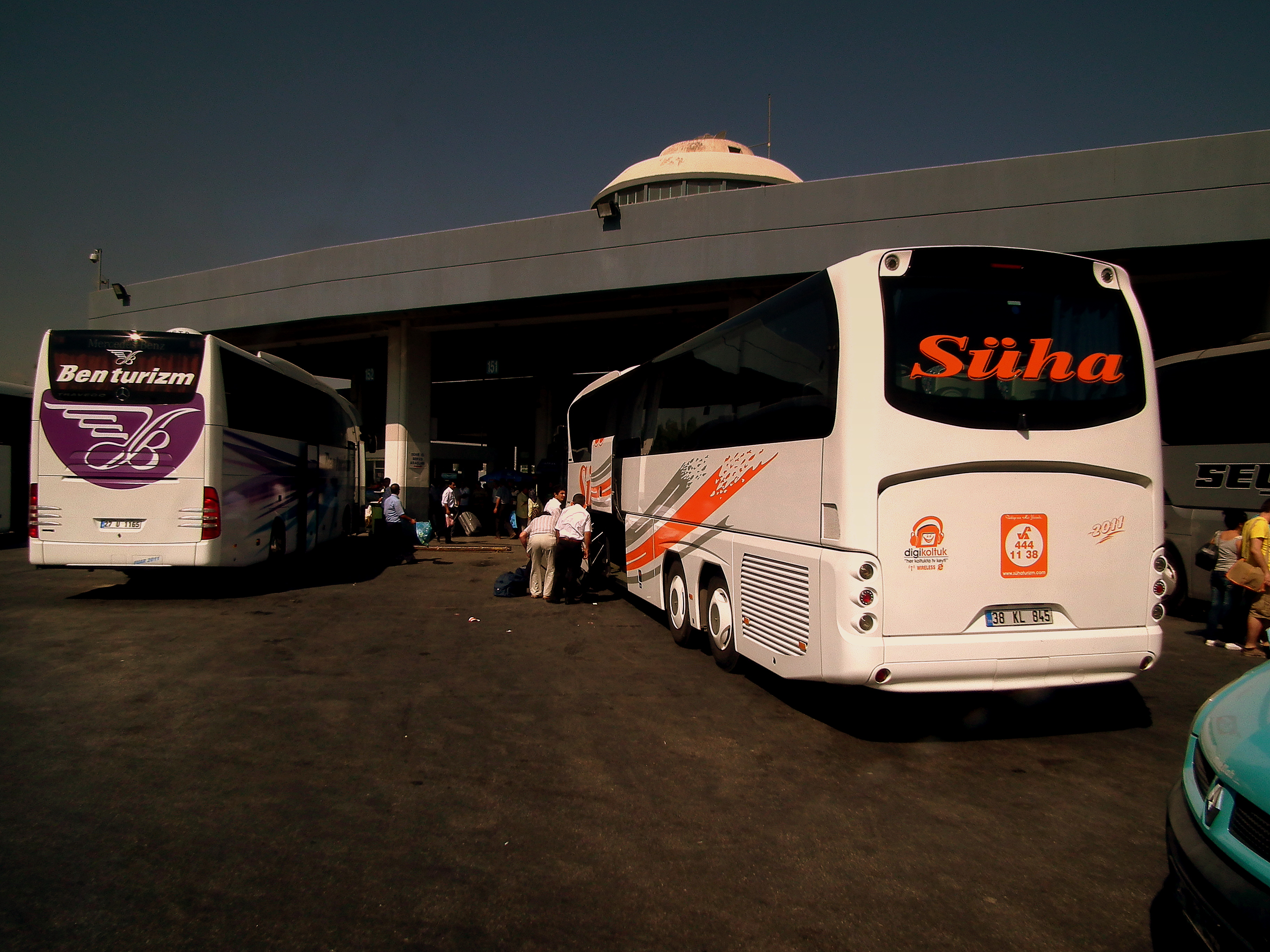
- The station will be located under the İzmir Coach Terminal.

General information
- Location: İzmir Otogarı, Karacaoğulları Mah., 35070; Bornova
- Coordinates: 38.4306°N 27.2137°E
- System: İzmir Metro rapid transit station
- Owner: İzmir Metropolitan Municipality
- Operator: İzmir Metro A.Ş.
- Line: 2 Alt
- Platforms: 1 island platform
- Tracks: 2

Construction
- Accessible: Yes

History
- Opened: 2020 (Expected)

Services
Preceding station	İzmir Metro	Following station
Future service
Altındağ towards Halkapınar	M5	Terminus
Location

Otogar is a proposed underground station and the eastern terminus of the M5 Line of the İzmir Metro. It will be located beneath the İzmir Coach Terminal in the southern Bornova district. Construction of the station, along with the metro line, is scheduled to begin in 2018. Connection to many intercity bus lines will be available from the station and with its completion, each major transit hub in the city will have access to rail transportation.

Otogar station is expected to open in 2020.
