= Merih Karaaslan =

Turkish architect

Merih Karaaslan (1949 - 3 January 2002) was a Turkish architect.

== Biography ==
Graduated from Istanbul Technical University in 1972. Between the years 1972-2002 has been working freelance architecture. He worked in various educational institutions as a part-time lecturer between the years of 1972-1980. He worked as an editor in the magazine 'Mimarlık' between the years 1985 and 1994 He worked as Secretary-general of the Chamber of Architects from 1992 to 1994 He was one of the founding members of the Freelance Architects Association. He participated in architectural competitions, including first prize of seventeen, took over ninety awards and honorable mentions, almost fifteen competitions had served as a jury member. He won the 'Best Project' award with the 'Ankara Terasevler Project' in the 2nd National Architecture Exhibition Site Project in 1990. He won the 'Best Building' award with the Cappadocia Peri Tower Hotel building at the 5th National Architecture Exhibition in 1996.

== Architecture ==
The different elements of various periods in history referred to by placing the different axes on the production and use of color is an attractive structure with the creation of the interest method, has been used frequently in the next products by the Karaaslan. Even as their own architectural identity that is declared in Karaaslan.

Karaaslan as an "image production" architecture. Ensuring that, as a result, the structure of the image which is sufficient. Even if the structure of the detail and workmanship problems image ignores the Karaaslan. "If in our country and the models of the designer's Particular production process monitoring when we found it, ignored the fine workmanship, a special detail and special materials are required to adopt a design that does not require it." the lyrics are this understanding.

The work of Karaaslan focuses on the relationship between interior and exterior spaces. This structure connects internal areas with urban exterior spaces to create specific environments.

Participating in her Town Hall square and the structure beneath the ALTINDAĞ entries defines space; ANDAŞ wide eaves in the Bazaar; Ostim Bazaar-office blocks, the block at the bottom of the exterior; ÇORUM cultural and Trade Center are examples of successful entry in the quest for this outdoor space. The importance of this special exterior and interior space, the Karaaslan displayed. Afyon City Bazaar ', Arinna Hotel/Side, Government House and the. Setup are examples of this attitude of the original interiors of the hotel Nevsehir. The importance of the external environment of the Interior of the structure, Karaaslan, especially the input options and looking for reference system and language of the indoors outdoors.

Karaaslan's design caught the other venues on a form and that the method is applied frequently and other studies. Contests are often used during the trial. Karaaslan has decided very quickly, within a few days the landing was a design's contribution to this approach. When it comes to a subject in front of a business, most of the time, memory, and from there to refer to certain patterns of Karaaslan, forms and uses. The Pavilion at Expo ' 92 in Turkey is captured in the form/image transformed in structure, and then ANDAŞ Bazaar in another market again. Government House of ALİAĞA in the Government House and the texture on the ZONGULDAK Office of the municipal Building block, for example Hotel Altindag's façade in the apartment, on the ground, and many cubic fragmentation Terasevler buildings is made of blocks of many public housing have been used frequently on your buildings.

Since the earliest days of his life, the architecture profession, Karaaslan organizations demonstrated in a special part of personality, fighting and architecture environment.

== Works and awards ==
- Altındag City Hall and Environmental Planning, 1st Prize, in 1986 Altındağ Town Hall
- İzmir Aliaga Government Office Architectural Project Competition, 1st. Prize, in 1983.ALIAGA GOVERNMENT OFFICE
- İzmir International Cultural Park and Fairground, Project Competition, 1st. Prize, in 1990.
- (1986) Afyon City Bazaar (with N.Karaaslan)AFYON CITY BAZAAR
- (1987) Side, Hotel Arinna (with N.Karaaslan)
- (1989) Kayseri Financial Office (with İ.Aksu)
- (1991) Sefik Gul Villa VILLA SEFIK GUL
- (1994) Ankara Yamacevler (with İ.Aksu)YAMACEVLER in Ankara
- (1993) Urfa Balıklıgol and surrounding and City Center (Competition, 1st.Prize).BALIKLIGOL in URFA
- National Architecture Awards, Construction Branch -Merit Pay, (Peritower Hotel, in 1996)PERI TOWER HOTEL
- National Architecture Awards, Architectural Project Branch - Merit Pay, (Terasevler, in 1990).TERASEVLER in ANKARA
- National Architecture Awards, Construction Branch "Living Environment", Merit Pay, in 1998.

== Books ==
Konutlar Villalar / Toplukonut ve Siteler / Yenileme Çalışmaları Yapı'dan Seçmeler 1 (1999)
