= İzmir Coach Terminal =

Bus station in İzmir, Turkey

İzmir Coach Bus Terminal İzmir Şehirlerarası Otobüs Terminali
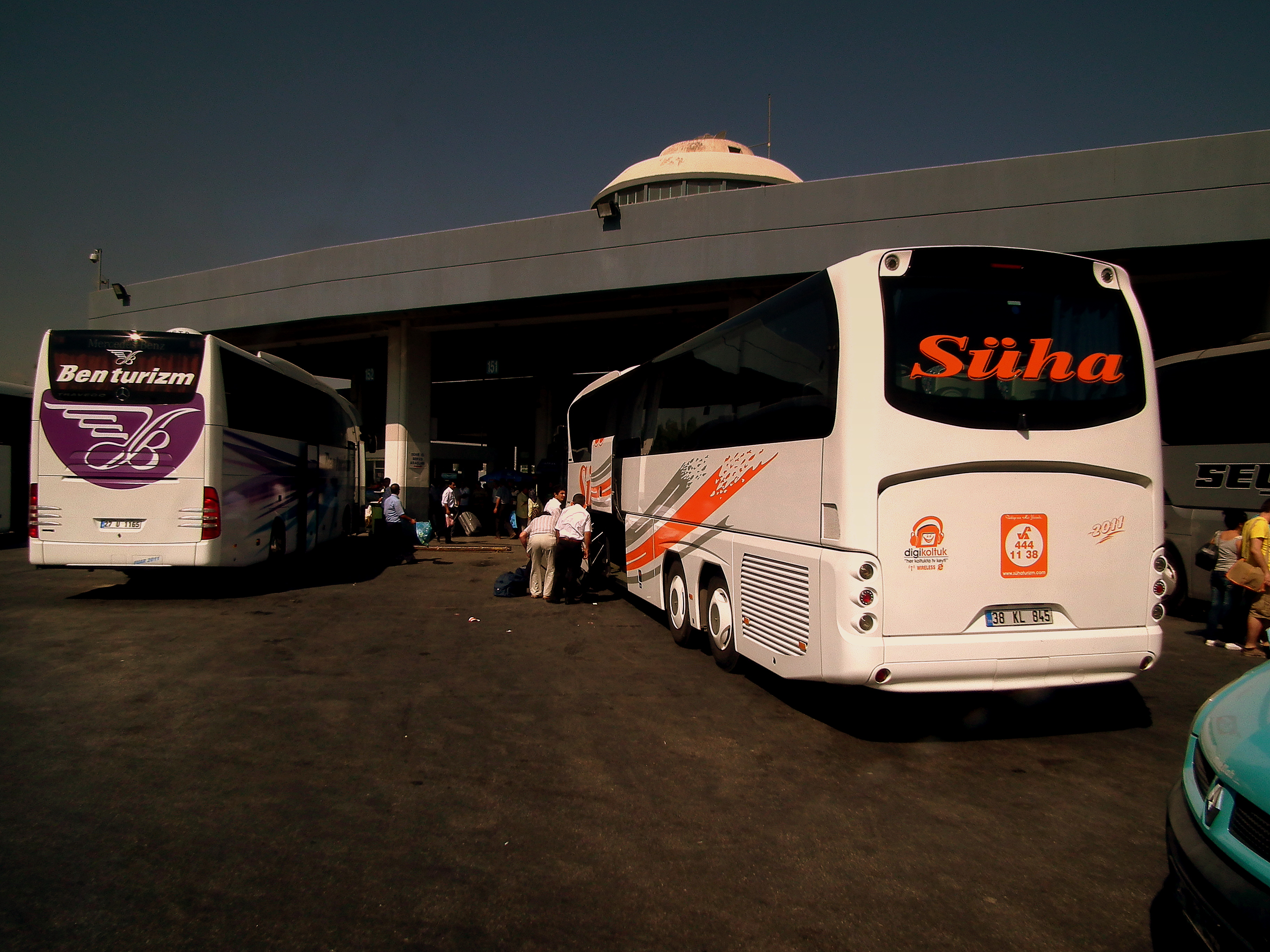

General information
- Location: Karacaoğlan Mah. Kemalpaşa Cad. No:285/2 Bornova, İzmir; Turkey
- Coordinates: 38°25′51″N 27°12′50″E
- Elevation: 90 m (300 ft)
- Owner: İzmir Metropolitan Municipality
- Operator: İzmir Otobüs ve Terminal İşletmeleri A.Ş. (İZOTAŞ) / İZULAŞ (disputed)
- Platforms: 146 intercity platforms+9 city bus bays+4 taxi park positions+82 city shuttle bays+9 city minibus platforms
- Connections: ESHOT, Otogar (İzmir Metro)(planned)

Construction
- Structure type: Reinforced concrete - carcass
- Platform levels: 4
- Parking: 1200 vehicles
- Cycle facilities: Limited
- Architect: Merih Karaaslan; İlker Aksu

Other information
- Status: Operational
- Fare zone: A,G,J (city buses) no fare integration (other modes)
- Website: www.izotas.com.tr

History
- Opened: 14 December 1998; 27 years ago

Passengers
- 75000 (daily, 2010)
Location

İzmir Coach Bus Terminal (Turkish: İzmir Şehirlerarası Otobüs Terminali, often abbreviated as İzmir Otogarı) is a bus terminal located in İzmir, Turkey. The bus station entered into service in December 1998.

== History ==
İzmir had a coach bus terminal in Basmane, which was then moved to Halkapınar in 1975. İzmir Metropolitan Municipality initiated a project tender to build a new coach bus terminal; Merih Karaaslan and İlker Aksu's project won tender. İZOTAŞ signed a build-operate-transfer (BOT) contract with municipality in September 1996, and initiated a tender for build. The bus terminal's base laid at 8 May 1997, then the bus terminal opened at 14 December 1998. İZOTAŞ have held operating right for the bus terminal until 2023. In 2020, a national competition was held for the new terminal campus and the winning projects were determined by the jury and made available to citizens. The new terminal campus had been planned to be completed quickly after the end of the contract and will be opened to the service of citizens.

=== Legal disputes ===
After the end of the operation contract on 14 December 2023; the İZOTAŞ refused to hand over the operation, citing the COVID-19 pandemic. The company then initiated a lengthy court battle for extending the BOT contract for another 7 years. Izmir 23th Civil Court of First Instance refused the case on 28 January 2025. The Yargıtay ruled in the favor of Izmir Metropolitan Municipality, repealing the injunctive relief on 4 August 2026 and permanently settling the case. The municipality has started to seize the company properties on 5 June 2026, worth almost 73 million Turkish liras as of 20 August 2026, for an outstanding debt of around 967 million Turkish liras. After the completion of handover, subsidiaries of the Municipality will operate the Terminal for five years, transferring %30 of the operating income to the Municipality.

== Architecture ==
İzmir Coach Bus Terminal built on 150.000 m^{2} area. It is the Turkey's biggest bus terminal with 120.000 m^{2} closed area. The bus station has 146 platform for buses. Also, it has a three-star hotel, 2 gas stations, parking lot for 1200 vehicles, and a conference hall that includes 300 seats.

== Service ==
172 transportation companies are in operation. Approximately 75.000 passengers are transported daily.
