= Halkapınar Transfer Center =

Railway station in İzmir, Turkey

Halkapınar
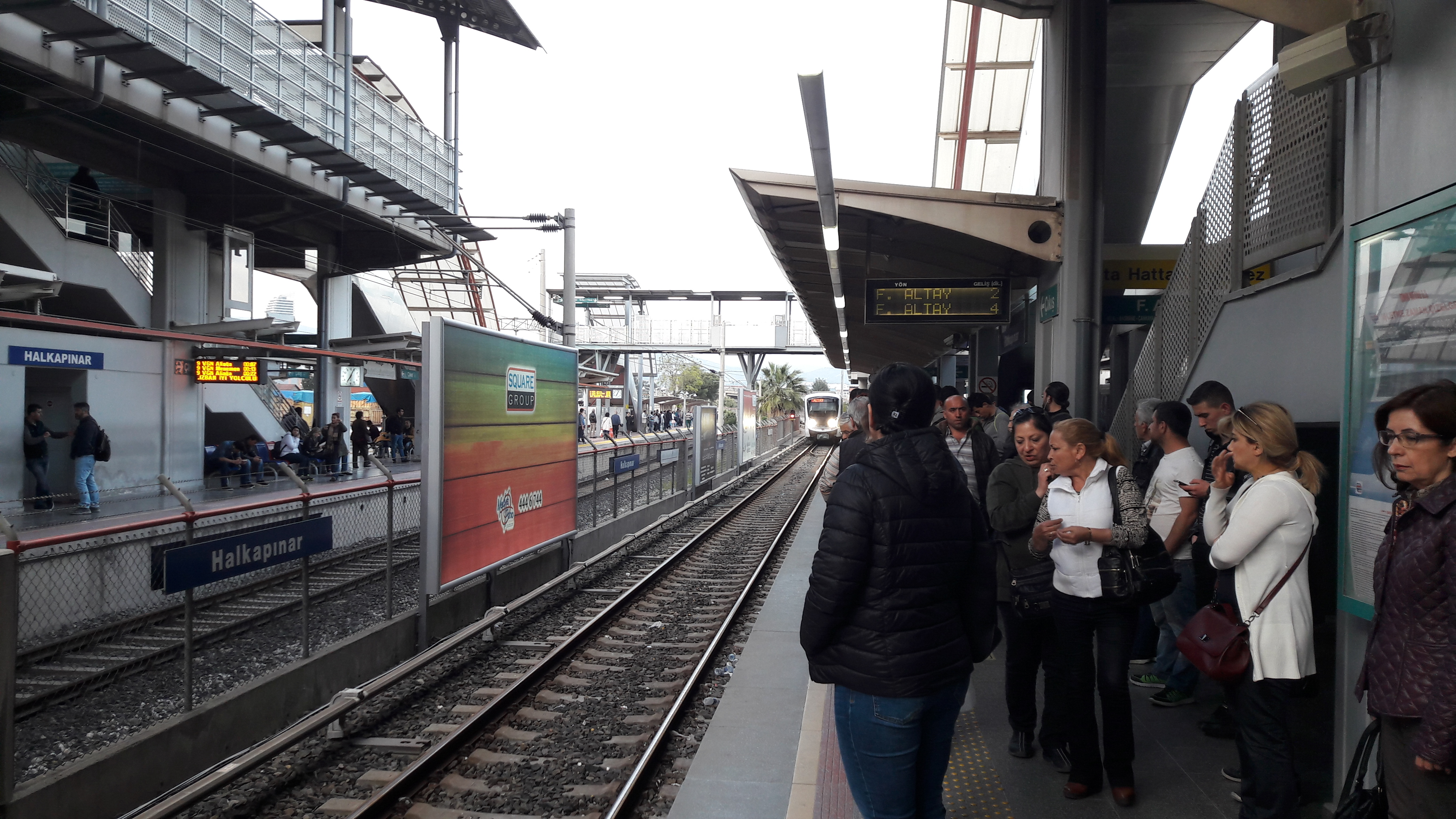
- Looking at the İZBAN platform from the westbound metro platform.

General information
- Coordinates: 38.260615°N 27.100646°E
- System: İZBAN commuter rail station İzmir Metro rapid transit station Tram İzmir light-rail station
- Owner: Turkish State Railways and İzmir Metropolitan Municipality
- Line: İzmir-Afyon railway
- Platforms: 1 island platform (İZBAN); 2 island platforms (İzmir Metro); 1 island platform (Konak Tram); 13 bus bays
- Tracks: 7
- Bus routes: ESHOT: Halkapınar: 53, 102, 154, 168, 364, 418, 475, 498, 501, 502, 503, 504, 513, 534, 543, 555, 560, 564, 599; Halkapınar 2: 77, 78, 125, 140, 147, 148, 240, 253, 335, 426, 434, 477, 577; Halkapınar Tramvay: 515, 539, 930

Construction
- Structure type: At-grade with bridges for intermodal connection
- Parking: No
- Cycle facilities: Yes
- Accessible: Yes

Other information
- Status: In Operation
- Station code: 3615 (TCDD); HAL (İzmir Metro)

History
- Opened: 20 July 1865 (railway station); 22 May 2000 (Transfer Center)
- Rebuilt: 2000, 2010
- Electrified: 2000 (750 V DC Third rail); 2001 (25 kV AC, 50 Hz OHLE)

Passengers
- 2016: 65,895 (Average daily ridership)

Services
Preceding station	İZBAN	Following station
Alsancak towards Cumaovası	Aliağa-Cumaovası	Salhane towards Aliağa
Alsancak towards Tepeköy	Menemen-Tepeköy	Salhane towards Menemen
Alsancak towards Tepeköy	Aliağa-Tepeköy (Late nights)	Salhane towards Aliağa
Preceding station	İzmir Metro	Following station
Hilal towards Narlıdere Kaymakamlık	M1	Stadyum towards Evka 3
Preceding station	Tram İzmir	Following station
Havagazı (Westbound only) towards Fahrettin Altay	T2	Terminus
Üniversite (Eastbound only) towards Fahrettin Altay	T2	Terminus
Future services
Preceding station	TCDD Taşımacılık	Following station
Terminus	Yüksek Hızlı Tren	Turgutlu towards Ankara
Preceding station	İzmir Metro	Following station
Terminus	M5	Vakıflar towards Otogar
Former services
Preceding station	Turkish State Railways	Following station
Hilal towards İzmir (Basmane)	Çiğli suburban	Çınarlı towards Çiğli
Hilal towards İzmir (Basmane)	Bornova suburban	Mersinli towards Ege Üniversitesi
Location

Halkapınar Transfer Center (Turkish: Halkapınar Aktarma Merkezi), commonly referred to as Halkapınar Metro or just Halkapınar, is a multi-modal transportation complex in İzmir, Turkey. Located in northeast Konak, it is the largest transportation complex in İzmir, as well as the Aegean Region. The complex offers connections between İZBAN commuter rail service, İzmir Metro rapid transit service, Tram İzmir tram service and ESHOT city bus service. Halkapınar Transfer Center was originally opened in 1865 as a railway station. The transfer center opened on 22 May 2000 together with a new metro station and bus terminals and was the first complex to offer direct connection between heavy rail and rapid transit service in Turkey.

== History ==
The oldest part of Halkapınar Transfer Center is the railway station. Originally built by the Smyrna Cassaba Railway (SCP), Halkapınar railway station opened on 20 July 1865 along with the railway from Basmane to Karşıyaka and Bornova. Halkapınar station was located just before the Bornova line diverged off the mainline to Karşıyaka and later Afyon. The SCP was bought by the Turkish State Railways in 1934, which continued to operate commuter trains that stopped at Halkapınar.

In a plan to improve rail service around İzmir, the city municipality began planning a commuter rail and rapid transit network. Halkapınar was designated to become the primary transfer point between the two systems. In 1994, the State Railways sold the Bornova Branch to the city of İzmir, which began construction of the İzmir Metro along its right-of-way. Construction of the İzmir Metro saw the addition of two new platforms and a maintenance facility at Halkapınar. The new facilities were completed in 1999 and Halkapınar Transfer Center officially opened on 22 May 2000. In anticipation for expanded commuter service to Aliağa, Halkapınar station was electrified with overhead wire. The station was electrified in 2001, but never used. In 2006, plans for a new commuter rail system, İZBAN, were finalized and the rehabilitation of the railway began. Between 2006 and 2010, Halkapınar saw a suspension of heavy rail trains, due to the construction of railway tunnels in Şirinyer and Karşıyaka. Service returned on 5 December 2010.

Ever since İZBAN began operating, Halkapınar has become the busiest station in İzmir and one of the busiest stations in Turkey. In order to accommodate the thousands of daily passengers, a second overpass was built to the east of the existing one in 2013. In 2016, Halkapınar saw a total of over 24 million boardings.

== Layout ==
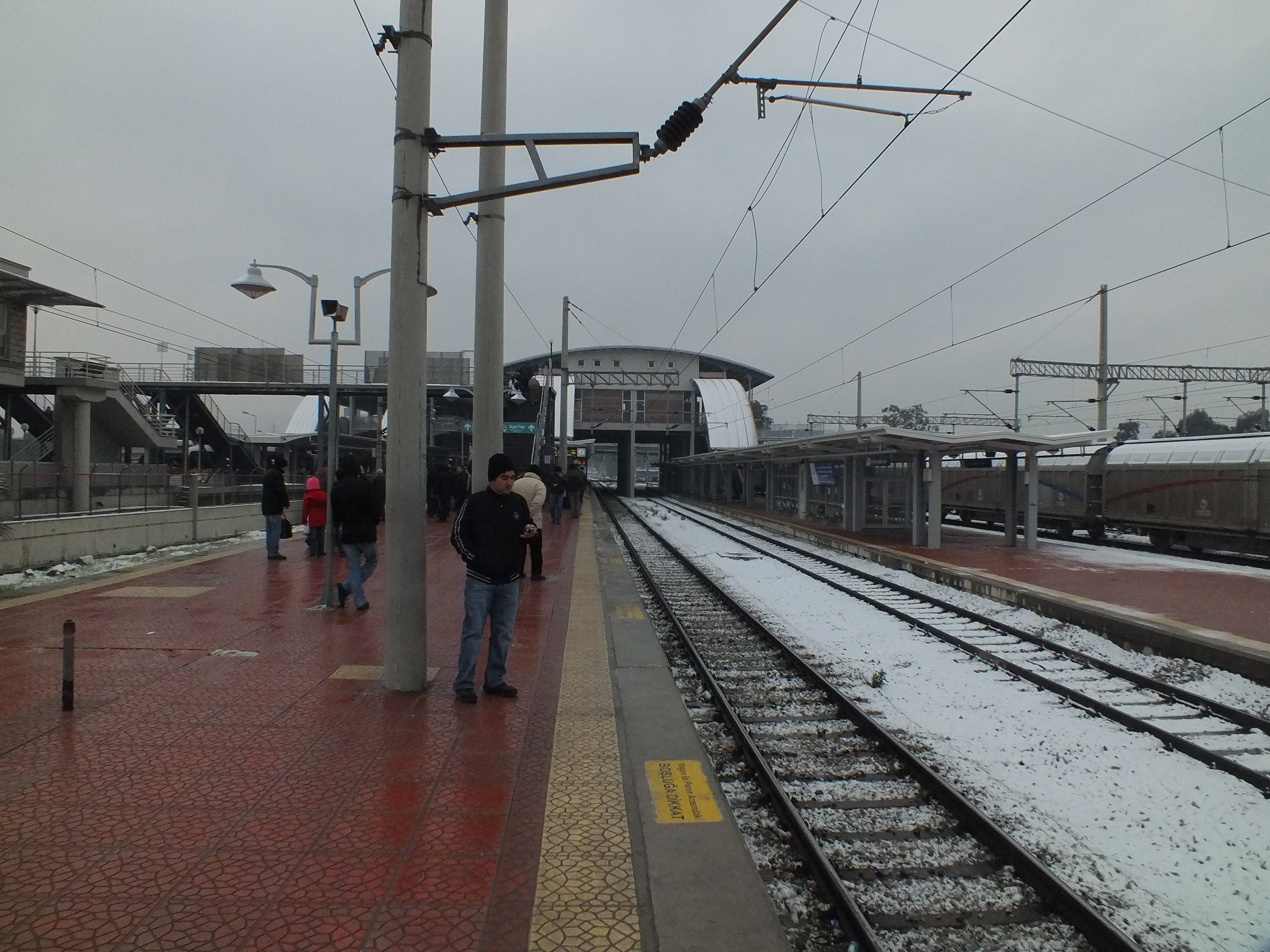
The İZBAN platform of Halkapınar looking towards the main overpass, the İzmir Metro station is to the left.

Halkapınar has a total of five island platforms serving nine tracks, three for metro, four for heavy rail in the main complex and two in the tram stop. The two island platforms on the southern side are for İzmir Metro trains on the M1 Line. Out of the other two platforms, the south platform (adjacent to the İzmir Metro platforms), is for İZBAN commuter trains, while the fourth platform is currently used for parking the freight stock. Prior to 2016, that platform was used by intercity and regional trains to Eskişehir, Balıkesir, Bandırma, Uşak and Konya.

On both sides of the platforms are railyards. On the north side is a small freight yard, used by TCDD Taşımacılık, for freight trains using the nearby Port of İzmir. On the south side is the İzmir Metro's Halkapınar Maintenance Facility, used for layovers and maintenance of their rolling stock. A new depot for Tram İzmir equipment has been built, next to the metro depot. Further south of the under construction tram depot is a bus garage, used by ESHOT, for their city bus fleet.

City buses arrive and depart from two separate bus terminals, located on opposite sides of the complex. The larger bus terminal, with 9 bus bays and 17 halts, is located to the southwest, accessible via Şehitler Avenue. The majority of buses depart from this terminal. The second and smaller one, with 6 bus bays and 8 halts, is located on the north side of the complex and is accessible via 1561st Street. Both terminals are accessible via the main overpass, connecting all facilities of the transfer center.

The tram station for the T2 Konak Tram is located on the southern side of the complex, along Şehitler Avenue. It is accessible via a walkway.

== Bus connections ==
ESHOT operates city bus service on Halkapınar Transfer Center.

ESHOT Bus service
Route number	Stop	Route	Location
53	Halkapınar Metro	MTK Altındağ — Halkapınar Metro	Halkapınar Transfer Center
77	Halkapınar Metro 2	Nafiz Gürman — Halkapınar Metro 2	Halkapınar Transfer Center
78	Halkapınar Metro 2	Yamanlar — Halkapınar Metro 2	Halkapınar Transfer Center
102	Halkapınar Metro	Alparslan Mah. — Halkapınar Metro	Halkapınar Transfer Center
125	Halkapınar Metro 2	Mustafa Kemal Mah. — Halkapınar Metro 2	Halkapınar Transfer Center
140	Halkapınar Metro 2	Örnekköy — Halkapınar Metro 2	Halkapınar Transfer Center
147	Halkapınar Metro 2	Postacı — Halkapınar Metro 2	Halkapınar Transfer Center
148	Halkapınar Metro 2	Onur Mah — Halkapınar Metro 2	Halkapınar Transfer Center
154	Halkapınar Metro	Altındağ — Halkapınar Metro	Halkapınar Transfer Center
168	Halkapınar Metro	Evka 4 — Halkapınar Metro	Halkapınar Transfer Center
240	Halkapınar Metro 2	Zübeyde Hanım Mah. — Halkapınar Metro 2	Halkapınar Transfer Center
253	Halkapınar Metro 2	H. Pınar Metro 2 — Konak	Halkapınar Transfer Center
335	Halkapınar Metro 2	Doğançay — Halkapınar Metro 2	Halkapınar Transfer Center
364	Halkapınar Metro	Gerikazanımcılar Sitesi — Halkapınar Metro	Halkapınar Transfer Center
418	Halkapınar Metro	Şirinyer Aktarma Merkezi — H. Pınar Metro	Halkapınar Transfer Center
426	Halkapınar Metro 2	Mustafa Kemal Mah. — Halkapınar Metro 2	Halkapınar Transfer Center
434	Halkapınar Metro 2	Körfez Mahallesi — Halkapınar Metro 2	Halkapınar Transfer Center
475	Halkapınar Metro	Tınaztepe Üniversitesi — Halkapınar Metro	Halkapınar Transfer Center
477	Halkapınar Metro 2	Nafiz Gürman — Halkapınar Metro 2	Halkapınar Transfer Center
498	Halkapınar Metro	Bornova Metro — Halkapınar Metro	Halkapınar Transfer Center
501	Halkapınar Metro	Çiçek Mah. — Halkapınar Metro	Halkapınar Transfer Center
502	Halkapınar Metro	Cengizhan — Halkapınar Metro	Halkapınar Transfer Center
503	Halkapınar Metro	Barış Kahvesi — Halkapınar Metro	Halkapınar Transfer Center
504	Halkapınar Metro	Fuat Edip Baksı — Halkapınar Metro	Halkapınar Transfer Center
513	Halkapınar Metro	Gazi Meydanı — Halkapınar Metro	Halkapınar Transfer Center
515	Halkapınar Tramvay	Tınaztepe — Evka 3 Metro	Halkapınar Transfer Center
534	Halkapınar Metro	Bayraklı Şehir Hastanesi — Halkapınar Metro	Halkapınar Transfer Center
539	Halkapınar Tramvay	Yenitepe Evleri — Salhane Aktarma Merkezi	Halkapınar Transfer Center
543	Halkapınar Metro	Bostanlı İskele — H. Pınar Metro	Halkapınar Transfer Center
555	Halkapınar Metro	Otogar — Halkapınar Metro	Halkapınar Transfer Center
560	Halkapınar Metro	Pınarbaşı — Halkapınar Metro	Halkapınar Transfer Center
564	Halkapınar Metro	Ayakkabıcılar Sitesi — Halkapınar Metro	Halkapınar Transfer Center
577	Halkapınar Metro 2	Nafiz Gürman — Halkapınar Metro 2	Halkapınar Transfer Center
599	Halkapınar Metro	M. Erener — Halkapınar Metro	Halkapınar Transfer Center
930 (night bus)	Halkapınar Tramvay	Bornova — Konak	Halkapınar Transfer Center

== Gallery ==
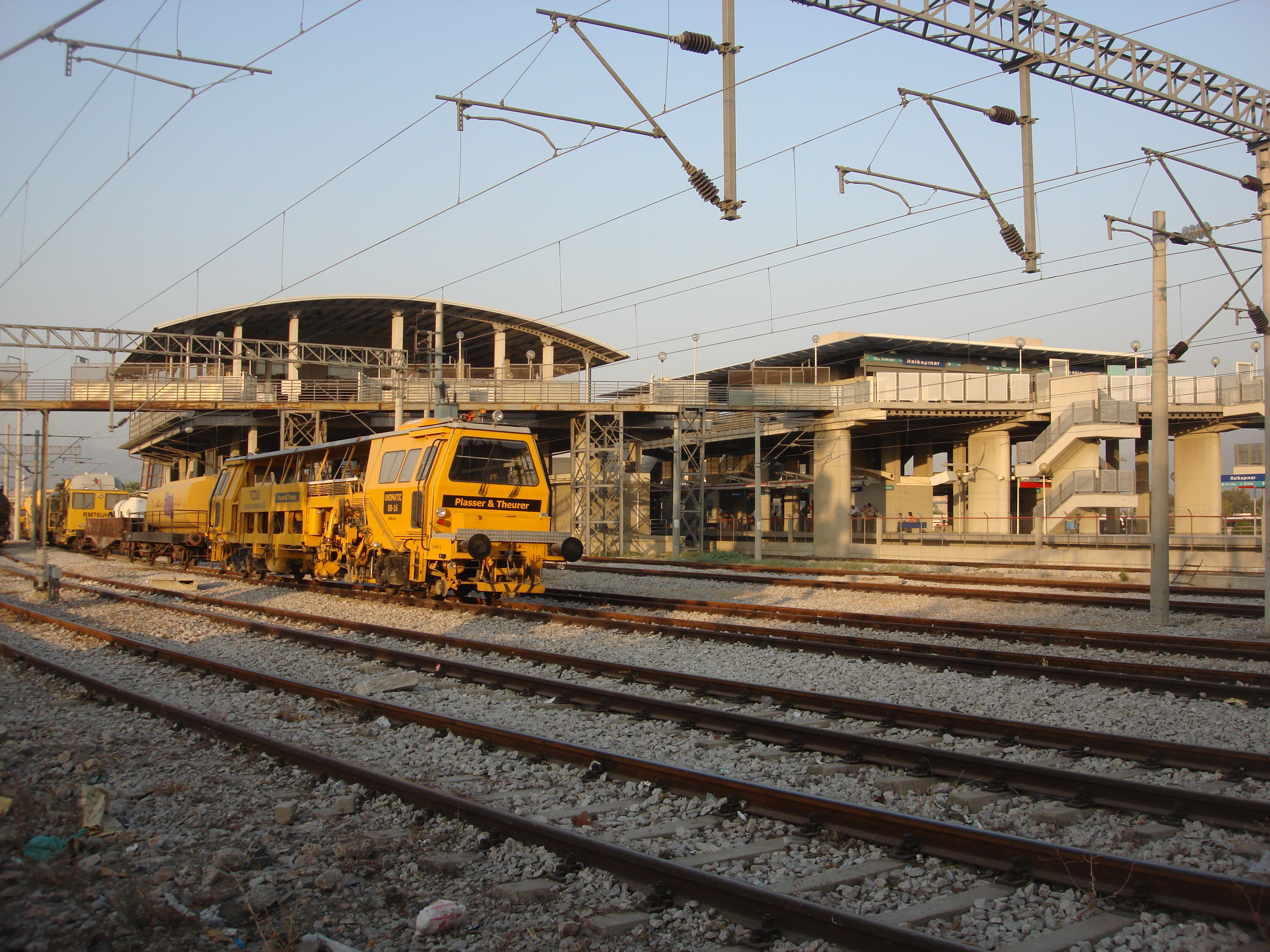
The western end of the station.
