= Responsibility =

Responsibility may refer to:

- Collective responsibility
- Corporate social responsibility
- Duty
- Legal liability
- Legal obligation
- Legal responsibility (disambiguation)
- Media responsibility
- Moral responsibility, or personal responsibility
- Obligation
- Professional responsibility
- Responsibility assumption, a doctrine in existential psychotherapy
- Social responsibility
- Single responsibility principle
- Responsibility for the burning of Smyrna
- Responsibility for the Holocaust
- The Westminster system constitutional conventions of:
  - Cabinet collective responsibility
  - Individual ministerial responsibility

== As a proper name ==
- Responsibility (novel), by Nigel Cox
- "Responsibility" (song), by punk band MxPx

== See also ==
- Accountability
- Blame
- Moral hazard
- "The Responsible", a 2011 episode of The Amazing World of Gumball
