= Narlıdere İtfaiye =

General information
- Location: Çamtepe Mah., 35320; Narlıdere
- Coordinates: 38.393721°N 27.014987°E
- System: İzmir Metro rapid transit station
- Owner: İzmir Metropolitan Municipality
- Operator: İzmir Metro A.Ş.
- Line: M1
- Platforms: 1 island platform
- Tracks: 2
- Connections: ESHOT Bus: 5, 6, 7, 8, 82, 321, 551, 909, 950, 975, 981, 982, 983, 984, 985, 987

Construction
- Parking: No
- Cycle facilities: No
- Accessible: Yes

History
- Opened: 24 February 2024; 2 years ago
- Electrified: 750V DC Third rail

Services
Preceding station	İzmir Metro	Following station
100. Yıl Cumhuriyet Şehitlik; towards Narlıdere Kaymakamlık	M1	Güzel Sanatlar towards Evka 3
Location

Narlıdere İtfaiye is an underground station on the M1 Line of the İzmir Metro in Narlıdere. Located under Mithatpaşa Avenue, it has one island platform servicing two tracks. The station was opened on 24 February 2024, after almost 6 years of construction.

== History ==
Construction of the seven station expansion of the subway line, west from Fahrettin Altay, began on 9 June 2018 with completion expected by December 2021. Narlıdere İtfaiye was opened on 24 February 2024, along with five other stations on the extension.

== Connections ==
ESHOT operates city bus services on Mithatpaşa Avenue.

ESHOT Bus service
Route Number	Stop	Route	Location
5	Narlıdere İtfaiye	Narlıdere — Üçkuyular İskele	Mithatpaşa Avenue
6	Narlıdere İtfaiye	Arıkent — Üçkuyular İskele	Mithatpaşa Avenue
7	Narlıdere İtfaiye	Sahilevleri — Üçkuyular İskele	Mithatpaşa Avenue
8	Narlıdere İtfaiye	Güzelbahçe — Fahrettin Altay Aktarma	Mithatpaşa Avenue
82	Narlıdere İtfaiye	Siteler — Fahrettin Altay Aktarma	Mithatpaşa Avenue
321	Narlıdere İtfaiye	Çamlı Mahallesi — Fahrettin Altay Aktarma	Mithatpaşa Avenue
551	Narlıdere İtfaiye	Narlıdere — Fahrettin Altay Aktarma	Mithatpaşa Avenue
909	Narlıdere İtfaiye	Zeytinalanı — Fahrettin Altay Aktarma	Mithatpaşa Avenue
950	Narlıdere İtfaiye	Narlıdere — Konak	Mithatpaşa Avenue
975	Narlıdere İtfaiye	Seferihisar — Fahrettin Altay Aktarma	Mithatpaşa Avenue
981	Narlıdere İtfaiye	Balıklıova — Fahrettin Altay Aktarma	Mithatpaşa Avenue
982	Narlıdere İtfaiye	İYTE — Fahrettin Altay Aktarma	Mithatpaşa Avenue
983	Narlıdere İtfaiye	Bademler — Fahrettin Altay Aktarma	Mithatpaşa Avenue
984	Narlıdere İtfaiye	Urla — Fahrettin Altay Aktarma	Mithatpaşa Avenue
985	Narlıdere İtfaiye	Seferihisar — Fahrettin Altay Aktarma	Mithatpaşa Avenue
987	Narlıdere İtfaiye	Ürkmez — Fahrettin Altay Aktarma	Mithatpaşa Avenue

== Station layout ==
S	Street level	Exit/entrance, buses
M	Mezzanine level	Ticket machines, turnstiles
P Platform level	Westbound	← toward Kaymakamlık (100. Yıl Cumhuriyet Şehitlik)
P Platform level	Island platform, doors will open on the left
P Platform level	Eastbound	toward Evka 3 (Güzel Sanatlar) →
