= Güzel Sanatlar (İzmir Metro) =

General information
- Location: Ilıca Mah., 35320; Narlıdere
- Coordinates: 38.392508°N 27.023539°E
- System: İzmir Metro rapid transit station
- Owner: İzmir Metropolitan Municipality
- Operator: İzmir Metro A.Ş.
- Line: M1
- Platforms: 1 island platform
- Tracks: 2
- Connections: ESHOT Bus: 5, 6, 7, 8, 82, 305, 321, 551, 909, 950, 971, 975, 981, 982, 983, 984, 985, 987

Construction
- Parking: No
- Cycle facilities: No
- Accessible: Yes

History
- Opened: 24 February 2024; 2 years ago
- Electrified: 750V DC Third rail

Services
Preceding station	İzmir Metro	Following station
Narlıdere İtfaiye towards Narlıdere Kaymakamlık	M1	Dokuz Eylül Üniversitesi Hastanesi towards Evka 3
Location

Güzel Sanatlar is an underground station on the M1 Line of the İzmir Metro in Narlıdere. Located under Mithatpaşa Avenue, it has one island platform servicing two tracks. The station was opened on 24 February 2024, after almost 6 years of construction.

== History ==
Construction of the seven station expansion of the subway line, west from Fahrettin Altay, began on 9 June 2018 with completion expected by December 2021. Güzel Sanatlar was opened on 24 February 2024, along with five other stations on the extension.

== Connections ==
ESHOT operates city bus services on Mithatpaşa Avenue.

ESHOT Bus service
Route number	Stop	Route	Location
5	Güzel Sanatlar Fakültesi	Narlıdere — Üçkuyular İskele	Mithatpaşa Avenue
6	Güzel Sanatlar Fakültesi	Arıkent — Üçkuyular İskele	Mithatpaşa Avenue
7	Güzel Sanatlar Fakültesi	Sahilevleri — Üçkuyular İskele	Mithatpaşa Avenue
8	Güzel Sanatlar Fakültesi	Güzelbahçe — Fahrettin Altay Aktarma	Mithatpaşa Avenue
82	Güzel Sanatlar Fakültesi	Siteler — Fahrettin Altay Aktarma	Mithatpaşa Avenue
305	Güzel Sanatlar Fakültesi	2. İnönü Mahallesi — Fahrettin Altay Aktarma	Mithatpaşa Avenue
321	Güzel Sanatlar Fakültesi	Çamlı Mahallesi — Fahrettin Altay Aktarma	Mithatpaşa Avenue
551	Güzel Sanatlar Fakültesi	Narlıdere — Fahrettin Altay Aktarma	Mithatpaşa Avenue
909	Güzel Sanatlar Fakültesi	Zeytinalanı — Fahrettin Altay Aktarma	Mithatpaşa Avenue
950	Güzel Sanatlar Fakültesi	Narlıdere — Konak	Mithatpaşa Avenue
971	Güzel Sanatlar Fakültesi	Narbel — Fahrettin Altay Aktarma	Mithatpaşa Avenue
975	Güzel Sanatlar Fakültesi	Seferihisar — Fahrettin Altay Aktarma	Mithatpaşa Avenue
981	Güzel Sanatlar Fakültesi	Balıklıova — Fahrettin Altay Aktarma	Mithatpaşa Avenue
982	Güzel Sanatlar Fakültesi	İYTE — Fahrettin Altay Aktarma	Mithatpaşa Avenue
983	Güzel Sanatlar Fakültesi	Bademler — Fahrettin Altay Aktarma	Mithatpaşa Avenue
984	Güzel Sanatlar Fakültesi	Urla — Fahrettin Altay Aktarma	Mithatpaşa Avenue
985	Güzel Sanatlar Fakültesi	Seferihisar — Fahrettin Altay Aktarma	Mithatpaşa Avenue
987	Güzel Sanatlar Fakültesi	Ürkmez — Fahrettin Altay Aktarma	Mithatpaşa Avenue

== Station layout ==
S	Street level	Exit/entrance, buses
M	Mezzanine level	Ticket machines, turnstiles
P Platform level	Westbound	← toward Kaymakamlık (Narlıdere İtfaiye)
P Platform level	Island platform, doors will open on the left
P Platform level	Eastbound	toward Evka 3 (Dokuz Eylül Üniversitesi Hastanesi) →
