= Balçova (İzmir Metro) =

General information
- Location: Bahçelerarası Mah., 35330; Balçova
- Coordinates: 38.395729°N 27.056956°E
- System: İzmir Metro rapid transit station
- Owner: İzmir Metropolitan Municipality
- Operator: İzmir Metro A.Ş.
- Line: M1
- Platforms: 1 island platform
- Tracks: 2
- Connections: ESHOT Bus: 5, 6, 7, 8, 82, 305, 311, 321, 510, 551, 650, 811, 909, 971, 975, 981, 982, 983, 984, 985, 987

Construction
- Parking: Yes
- Cycle facilities: No
- Accessible: Yes

History
- Opened: 24 February 2024; 2 years ago
- Electrified: 750V DC Third rail

Services
Preceding station	İzmir Metro	Following station
Çağdaş towards Narlıdere Kaymakamlık	M1	Fahrettin Altay towards Evka 3
Location

Balçova is an underground station on the M1 Line of the İzmir Metro in Balçova. Located next to Mithatpaşa Avenue, it has one island platform servicing two tracks. The station was opened on 24 February 2024, after almost 6 years of construction.

== History ==
Construction of the seven station expansion of the subway line, west from Fahrettin Altay, began on 9 June 2018 with completion expected by December 2021. Balçova was opened on 24 February 2024, along with five other stations on the extension.

A parking lot with a capacity of 186 vehicles will be built near the station.

== Connections ==
ESHOT operates city bus services on Mithatpaşa Avenue.

ESHOT Bus service
Route number	Stop	Route	Location
5	Balçova Kahveler	Narlıdere — Üçkuyular İskele	Mithatpaşa Avenue
6	Balçova Kahveler	Arıkent — Üçkuyular İskele	Mithatpaşa Avenue
7	Balçova Kahveler	Sahilevleri — Üçkuyular İskele	Mithatpaşa Avenue
8	Balçova Kahveler	Güzelbahçe — Fahrettin Altay Aktarma	Mithatpaşa Avenue
82	Balçova Kahveler	Siteler — Fahrettin Altay Aktarma	Mithatpaşa Avenue
305	Balçova Kahveler	2. İnönü Mahallesi — Fahrettin Altay Aktarma	Mithatpaşa Avenue
311	Balçova Kahveler	İnciraltı — Fahrettin Altay	Mithatpaşa Avenue
321	Balçova Kahveler	Çamlı Mahallesi — Fahrettin Altay Aktarma	Mithatpaşa Avenue
510	Balçova Kahveler	Gaziemir — Balçova	Mithatpaşa Avenue
551	Balçova Kahveler	Narlıdere — Fahrettin Altay Aktarma	Mithatpaşa Avenue
650	Balçova Kahveler	Fuar İzmir — Balçova	Mithatpaşa Avenue
811	Balçova Kahveler	Engelliler Merkezi — Montrö	Mithatpaşa Avenue
909	Balçova Kahveler	Zeytinalanı — Fahrettin Altay Aktarma	Mithatpaşa Avenue
971	Balçova Kahveler	Narbel — Fahrettin Altay Aktarma	Mithatpaşa Avenue
975	Balçova Kahveler	Seferihisar — Fahrettin Altay Aktarma	Mithatpaşa Avenue
981	Balçova Kahveler	Balıklıova — Fahrettin Altay Aktarma	Mithatpaşa Avenue
982	Balçova Kahveler	İYTE — Fahrettin Altay Aktarma	Mithatpaşa Avenue
983	Balçova Kahveler	Bademler — Fahrettin Altay Aktarma	Mithatpaşa Avenue
984	Balçova Kahveler	Urla — Fahrettin Altay Aktarma	Mithatpaşa Avenue
985	Balçova Kahveler	Seferihisar — Fahrettin Altay Aktarma	Mithatpaşa Avenue
987	Balçova Kahveler	Ürkmez — Fahrettin Altay Aktarma	Mithatpaşa Avenue

== Station layout ==
S	Street level	Exit/entrance, buses
M	Mezzanine level	Ticket machines, turnstiles
P Platform level	Westbound	← toward Kaymakamlık (Çağdaş)
P Platform level	Island platform, doors will open on the left
P Platform level	Eastbound	toward Evka 3 (Fahrettin Altay) →
