= 100. Yıl Cumhuriyet Şehitlik =

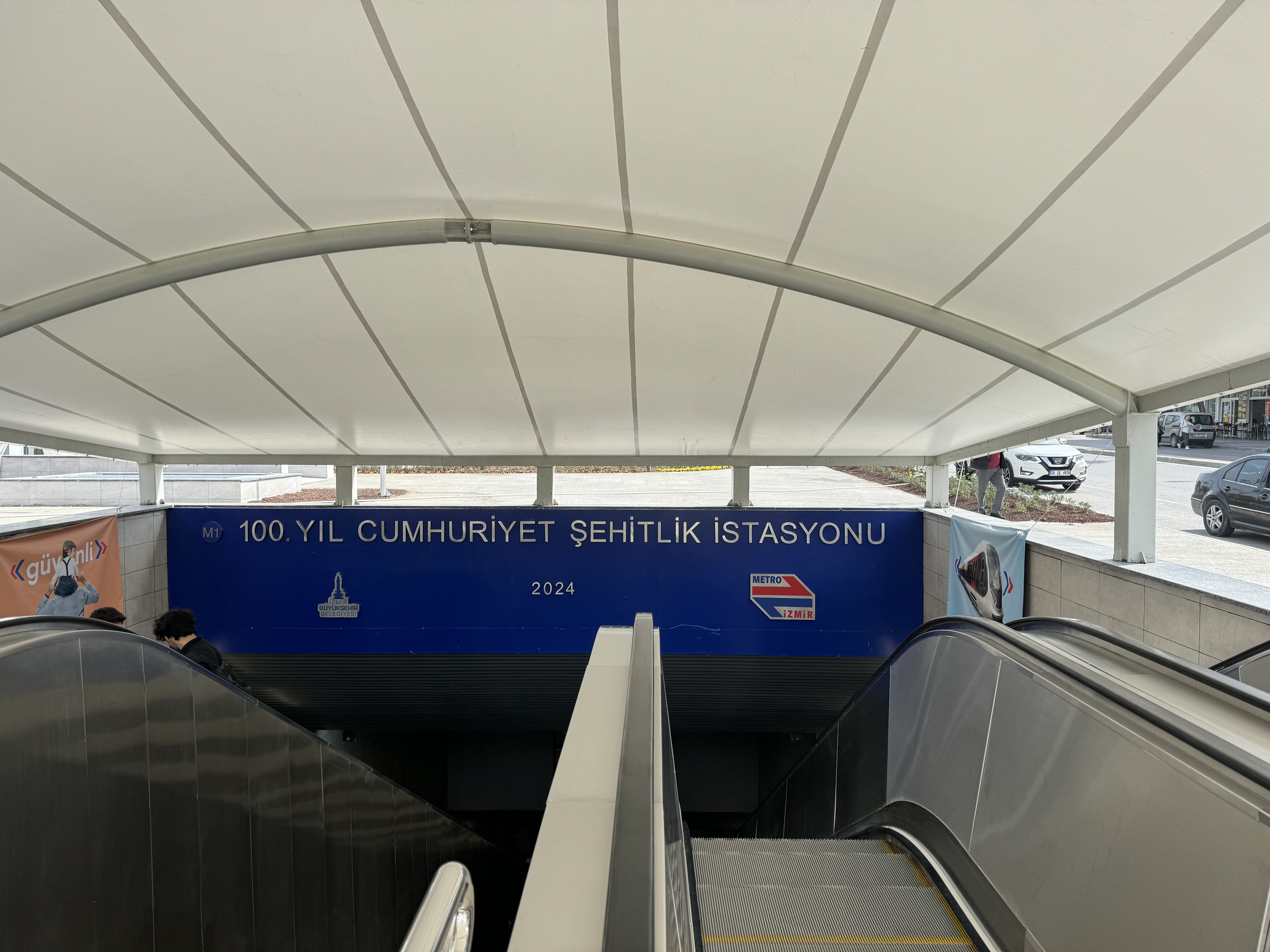
- Station entrance on Mithatpaşa Avenue

General information
- Other names: Şehitlik
- Location: Çatalkaya Mah. — Narlı Mah., 35320; Narlıdere
- Coordinates: 38.395934°N 27.001025°E
- System: İzmir Metro rapid transit station
- Owner: İzmir Metropolitan Municipality
- Operator: İzmir Metro A.Ş.
- Line: M1
- Platforms: 1 island platform
- Tracks: 2
- Connections: ESHOT Bus: 5, 6, 7, 8, 82, 321, 551, 909, 950, 975, 981, 982, 983, 984, 985, 987

Construction
- Parking: No
- Cycle facilities: No
- Accessible: Yes

History
- Opened: 24 February 2024; 2 years ago
- Electrified: 750V DC Third rail

Services
| Preceding station | İzmir Metro | Following station |
|---|---|---|
| Narlıdere Kaymakamlık Terminus | M1 | Narlıdere İtfaiye towards Evka 3 |
Location

100. Yıl Cumhuriyet Şehitlik is an underground station on the M1 Line of the İzmir Metro in Narlıdere. Located under Mithatpaşa Avenue, it has one island platform servicing two tracks. The station was opened on 24 February 2024, after almost 6 years of construction.

== History ==
Construction of the seven station expansion of the subway line, west from Fahrettin Altay, began on 9 June 2018 with completion expected by December 2021. 100. Yıl Cumhuriyet Şehitlik was opened on 24 February 2024, along with five other stations on the extension.

== Connections ==
ESHOT operates city bus services on Mithatpaşa Avenue.

ESHOT Bus service
| Route number | Stop | Route | Location |
|---|---|---|---|
| 5 | Şehitlik | Narlıdere — Üçkuyular İskele | Mithatpaşa Avenue |
| 6 | Şehitlik | Arıkent — Üçkuyular İskele | Mithatpaşa Avenue |
| 7 | Şehitlik | Sahilevleri — Üçkuyular İskele | Mithatpaşa Avenue |
| 8 | Şehitlik | Güzelbahçe — Fahrettin Altay Aktarma | Mithatpaşa Avenue |
| 82 | Şehitlik | Siteler — Fahrettin Altay Aktarma | Mithatpaşa Avenue |
| 321 | Şehitlik | Çamlı Mahallesi — Fahrettin Altay Aktarma | Mithatpaşa Avenue |
| 551 | Şehitlik | Narlıdere — Fahrettin Altay Aktarma | Mithatpaşa Avenue |
| 909 | Şehitlik | Zeytinalanı — Fahrettin Altay Aktarma | Mithatpaşa Avenue |
| 950 | Şehitlik | Narlıdere — Konak | Mithatpaşa Avenue |
| 975 | Şehitlik | Seferihisar — Fahrettin Altay Aktarma | Mithatpaşa Avenue |
| 981 | Şehitlik | Balıklıova — Fahrettin Altay Aktarma | Mithatpaşa Avenue |
| 982 | Şehitlik | İYTE — Fahrettin Altay Aktarma | Mithatpaşa Avenue |
| 983 | Şehitlik | Bademler — Fahrettin Altay Aktarma | Mithatpaşa Avenue |
| 984 | Şehitlik | Urla — Fahrettin Altay Aktarma | Mithatpaşa Avenue |
| 985 | Şehitlik | Seferihisar — Fahrettin Altay Aktarma | Mithatpaşa Avenue |
| 987 | Şehitlik | Ürkmez — Fahrettin Altay Aktarma | Mithatpaşa Avenue |

== Station layout ==
| S | Street level | Exit/entrance, buses |
| M | Mezzanine level | Ticket machines, turnstiles |
| P Platform level | Westbound | ← toward Narlıdere Kaymakamlık (Narlıdere Kaymakamlık) |
| P Platform level | Island platform, doors will open on the left |
| P Platform level | Eastbound | toward Evka 3 (Narlıdere İtfaiye) → |
