= Responsibility for the burning of Smyrna =

Debate about the side responsible for the burning of Smyrna

The question of who was responsible for starting the burning of Smyrna continues to be debated, with Turkish sources mostly attributing responsibility to Greeks or Armenians, and vice versa. Other sources, on the other hand, suggest that at the very least, Turkish inactivity played a significant part on the event.

The majority of non-Turkish researchers agree that the fire was caused by Turkish soldiers in order to completely eradicate the Christian presence in Anatolia.

== Sources claiming Turkish responsibility ==
=== George Horton ===
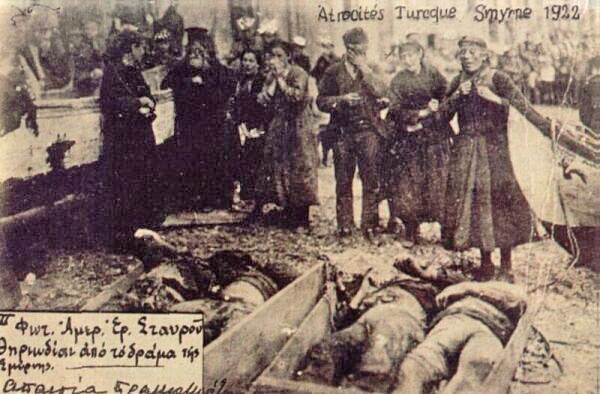
Greek refugees mourning victims of the Smyrna events.

George Horton was the U.S. Consul General of Smyrna. He was compelled to evacuate Smyrna on 13 September, and arrived in Athens on 14 September. In 1926, he published his own account of what happened in Smyrna, titled The Blight of Asia. He included testimonies from a number of eyewitnesses, and quoted a number of contemporary scholars.

==== Origins of the fire ====
Horton's account states that the last of the Greek soldiers had abandoned Smyrna during the evening of 8 September, since it was known in advance that Turkish soldiers would arrive on 9 September. He said that Turkish soldiers set the fire on 13 September:

They set fire to the Armenian quarter on the thirteenth of September, 1922. The last Greek soldiers had passed through Smyrna on the evening of the eighth, that is to say, the Turks had been in full, complete and undisputed possession of the city for five davs before the fire broke out and for much of this time they had kept the Armenian quarter cut off by military control while conducting a systematic and thorough massacre. If any Armenians were still living in the localities at the time the fires were lighted they were hiding in cellars too terrified to move, for the whole town was overrun by Turkish soldiers, especially the places where the fires were started. In general, all the Christians of the city were keeping to their houses in a state of extreme and justifiable terror for themselves and their families, for the Turks had been in possession of the city for five days, during which time they had been looting, raping and killing. It was the burning of the houses of the Christians which drove them into the streets and caused the fearful scenes of suffering which will be described later. Of this state of affairs, I was an eye-witness.

The Turkish soldiers first cleared the Armenian quarter, and then torched a number of houses simultaneously behind the American Intercollegiate Institute. They waited for the wind to blow in the right direction, away from the homes of the Muslim population, before starting the fire. This report is backed up by the eyewitness testimony of Miss Minnie Mills, the dean of the Intercollegiate Institute:

I could plainly see the Turks carrying the tins of petroleum into the houses, from which, in each instance, fire burst forth immediately afterward. There was not an Armenian in sight, the only persons visible being Turkish soldiers of the regular army in smart uniforms.

This was confirmed by the eyewitness report of Mrs King Birge, the wife of an American missionary, who viewed events from the tower of the American College at Paradise:

I went up into the tower of the American College at Paradise, and, with a pair of field-glasses, could plainly see Turkish soldiers setting fire to houses. I could see Turks lurking in the fields, shooting at Christians. When I drove down to Smyrna from Paradise to Athens, there were dead bodies all along the road.

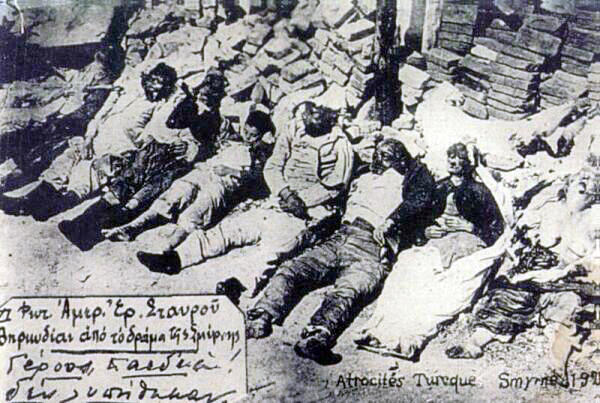
Greek victims of the Smyrna events.

==== Contemporary scholars quoted ====
Horton quoted contemporary scholars within his account, including the historian William Stearns Davis: "The Turks drove straight onward to Smyrna, which they took (9 September 1922) and then burned." Also, Sir Valentine Chirol, lecturer at the University of Chicago: "After the Turks had smashed the Greek armies they turned the essentially Greek city (Smyrna) into an ash heap as proof of their victory."

==== Summary of the destruction of Smyrna ====
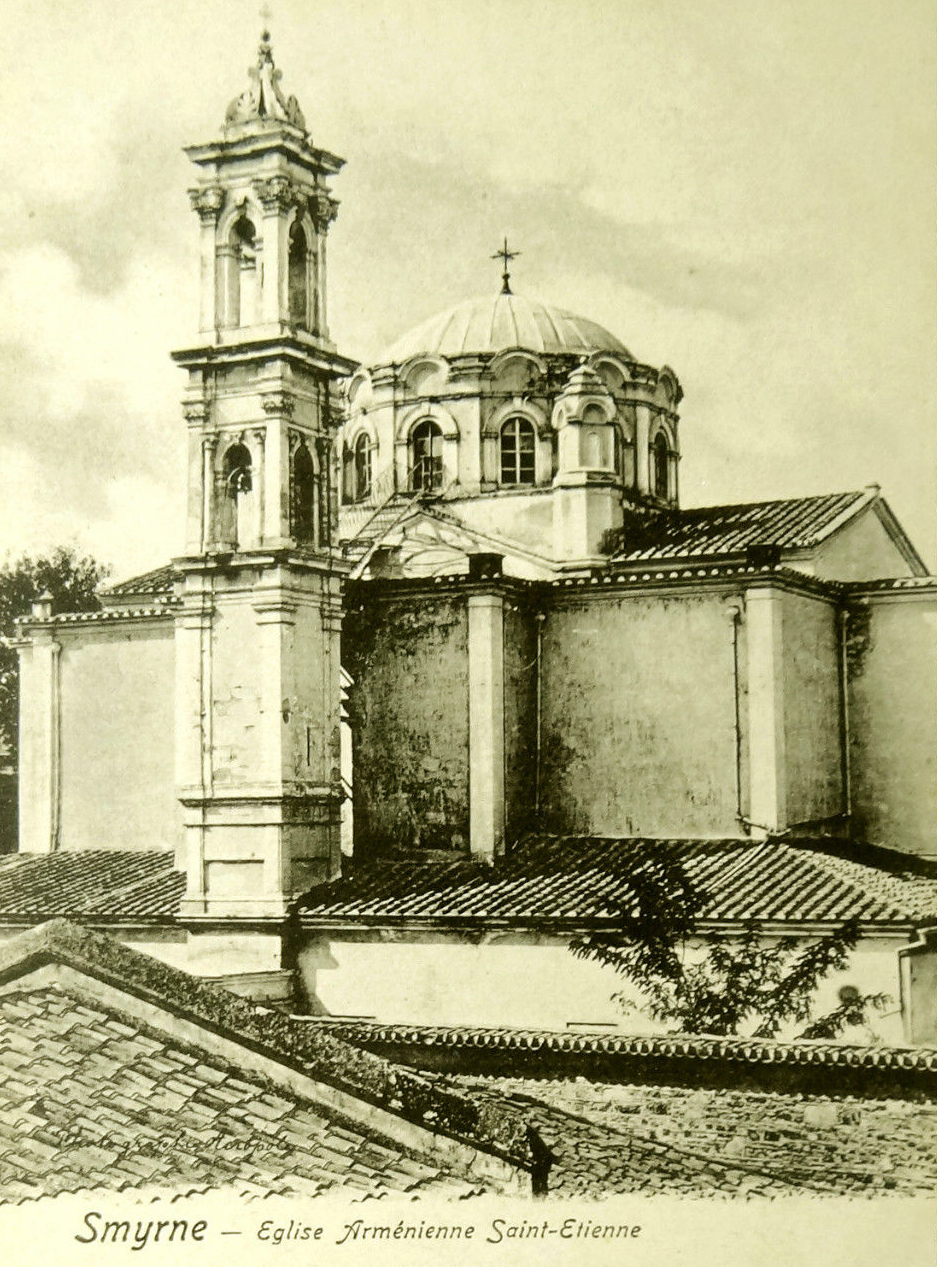
The St. Stepanos Armenian Church located in the Basmane district served the Armenian community of Smyrna. It was reportedly set on fire by Turkish troops during the burning of Smyrna.

The following is an abridged summary of notable events in the destruction of Smyrna described in Horton's account:

- Turkish soldiers cordoned off the Armenian quarter during the massacre. Armed Turks massacred Armenians and looted the Armenian quarter.
- After their systematic massacre, uniformed Turkish soldiers set fire to Armenian buildings using tins of petroleum and flaming rags soaked in flammable liquids.
- Soldiers planted small bombs under paving slabs around the Christian parts of the city to take down walls. One of the bombs was planted near the American Consulate and another at the American Girls' School.
- The fire was started on 13 September. The last Greek soldiers had evacuated Smyrna on 8 September. The Turkish Army was in full control of Smyrna from 9 September. All Christians remaining in the city who evaded massacre stayed within their homes, fearing for their lives. The burning of the homes forced Christians into the streets. Horton personally witnessed this.
- The fire was initiated at one edge of the Armenian quarter when a strong wind was blowing toward the Christian part of town and away from the Muslim part of town. Citizens of the Muslim quarter were not involved in the catastrophe. The Muslim quarter celebrated the arrival of the Turkish Army.
- Turkish soldiers guided the fire through the modern Greek and European section of Smyrna by pouring flammable liquids into the streets. These were poured in front of the American Consulate to guide the fire, as witnessed by C. Clafun David, the Chairman of the Disaster Relief Committee of the Red Cross (Constantinople Chapter) and others who were standing at the door of the consulate. Mr Davis testified that he put his hands in the mud where the flammable liquid was poured and indicated that it smelled like mixed petroleum and gasoline. The soldiers who were observed doing this had started from the quay and proceeded towards the fire, thus ensuring the rapid and controlled spread of the fire.
- Dr Alexander Maclachlan, the president of the American College, together with a sergeant of the American Marines, were stripped and beaten with clubs by Turkish soldiers. In addition, a squad of American Marines was fired on.

=== Charles Dobson ===
Charles Dobson, an Anglican chaplain in Smyrna, was convinced that the Turks started the fire. He wrote multiple reports stating this belief in response to Turkish denial of responsibility.

=== Winston Churchill ===
Winston Churchill, future Prime Minister of the United Kingdom, then-Secretary of State for the Colonies, wrote in 1929: "Mustapha Kemal's Army...celebrated their triumph by the burning of Smyrna to ashes and by a vast massacre of its Christian population".

=== Oran Raber ===
Oran Raber, an assistant professor of botany at the University of Wisconsin, was visiting Smyrna as a tourist when the fire broke out. According to his statement, hundreds of Armenians had gathered in the Armenian church in their search for protection, but they still held on to their guns and ammunition. When they refused to surrender and come out, the Turks threw a bomb at the church, thereby setting it on fire and blowing up the ammunition of the Armenians. As such, instead of attempting to extinguish the fire, the Turks aided and directed it by petrol.

=== Other American eyewitnesses ===
One of the witnesses in Marjorie Housepian Dobkin's account was the American industrial engineer Mark Prentiss, a foreign trade specialist in Smyrna, who was also acting as a freelance correspondent for the New York Times. He was an eyewitness to many of the events which occurred in Smyrna. He was initially quoted in The New York Times as putting the blame on the Turkish military. Prentiss arrived in Smyrna 8 September 1922, one day before the Turkish Army marched into Smyrna. He was a special representative of the Near East Relief (an American charity organization whose purpose was to watch over and protect Armenians during the war). He arrived on the destroyer USS Lawrence, under the command of Captain Wolleson. His superior was Rear Admiral Mark Lambert Bristol, U.S. High Commissioner to the Ottoman Empire from 1919 to 1927, present in Constantinople. Bristol was intent on securing economic concessions for the United States from Turkey and made a concerted effort to prevent any news report to appear to show any favor to the Armenians or Greeks. He once remarked that "I hate the Greeks. I hate the Armenians and I hate the Jews. The Turks are fine fellows."

The former American vice-consul to Persia was so incensed by Bristol's efforts to stifle news coming out of Smyrna, that he took out an op-ed in New York Times to write, "The United States cannot afford to have its fair name besmirched and befouled by allowing such a man to speak for the American soul and conscience."

Prentiss' initial published statements were as follows:

Many of us personally saw – and are ready to affirm the statement – Turkish soldiers often directed by officers throwing petroleum in the street and houses. Vice-Consul Barnes watched a Turkish officer leisurely fire the Custom House and the Passport Bureau while at least fifty Turkish soldiers stood by. Major Davis saw Turkish soldiers throwing oil in many houses. The Navy patrol reported seeing a complete horseshoe of fires started by the Turks around the American school.

Critics of Prentiss point out that Prentiss changed his story, giving two very different statements of events at different times. Initially, Prentiss had cabled his account, which was printed in The New York Times on 18 September 1922 as "Eyewitness Story of Smyrna's Horror; 200,000 Victims of Turks and Flames". Upon his return to the United States, he was pressured by Mark Bristol, a pro-Turkish American admiral who harboured viciously anti-Greek and anti-Armenian sentiments, to put a different version on record. Prentiss then claimed that it was the Armenians who had set the fire. Bristol reported that during the Turkish capture of Smyrna and the ensuing fire the number of deaths due to killings, fire, and execution did not exceed 2,000. He is the only one to offer such a low estimate of fatalities. William H. King even introduced a resolution in the U.S. Senate asking for an investigation into Bristol's pro-Turkish attitude.

=== Theodore Bartoli ===
Theodore Bartoli, an Italian resident of Smyrna, stated that from 11 September, Turkish soldiers had secretly placed bombs in Armenian houses with the intention of 'discovering' them later and using them as a pretext to massacre the inhabitants, rob their homes and set fire to their houses. Fighting between Armenian bands and Turkish soldiers continued throughout the next day, until on 13 September a large crowd of Armenians had barricaded themselves in the St. Stepanos Church. Demanding that they come out, the Turkish soldiers shot 500 Armenians as they left the church; the soldiers then went in, spread petrol on the floor and burnt the remaining Armenians alive in their church. Bartoli writes that the Turkish troops repeated this measure with two Greek churches. As such, according to this account, the Turks not only started the fire, but also actively spread it.

=== Non-contemporary sources ===
==== René Puaux ====
A near-contemporaneous account is given by René Puaux, correspondent for the respected Paris newspaper Le Temps, who had been posted in Smyrna since 1919. Based on multiple eyewitness accounts, he concluded that "by Wednesday [13 September] the putrefaction of the bodies, left unattended since the 9th in the evening, became untolerable, explaining what happened. The Turks, having pillaged the Armenian quarter and massacred a great portion of its inhabitants, resorted to fire to erase the trace of their actions." He also quoted a telegraph by Major General F. Maurice, special correspondent for the Daily News in Constantinople, concluding that "The fire started on the 13th, in the afternoon, in the Armenian quarter, but the Turkish authorities did nothing serious to stop it. The next day eyewitnesses saw a large number of Turkish soldiers throwing gasoline and setting houses on fire. The Turkish authorities could have prevented the fire from reaching the European quarters. Turkish soldiers, acting deliberately, are the primary cause of the terrible spread of the disaster."

==== Giles Milton ====
British author Giles Milton's Paradise Lost: Smyrna 1922 (2008) is a graphic account of the sack of Smyrna (modern İzmir) in 1922 recounted through the eyes of the city's Levantine community. Milton's book is based on eyewitness accounts of those who were there, making use of unpublished diaries and letters written by Smyrna's Levantine elite: He contends that their voices are among the few impartial ones in a highly contentious episode of history.

Paradise Lost chronicles the violence that followed the Greek landing through the eyewitness accounts of the Levantine community. The author offers a reappraisal of Smyrna's first Greek governor, Aristidis Stergiadis, whose impartiality towards both Greeks and Turks earned him considerable enmity amongst the local Greek population.

The third section of Paradise Lost is a day-by-day account of what happened when the Turkish army entered Smyrna. The narrative is constructed from accounts written principally by Levantines and Americans who witnessed the violence first hand, in which the author seeks to apportion blame and discover who started the conflagration that was to cause the city's near-total destruction. According to Milton, the fire was started by the Turkish army, who brought in thousands of barrels of oil and poured them over the streets of Smyrna, with the exception of the Turkish quarter. The book also investigates the role played by the commanders of the 21 Allied warships in the bay of Smyrna, who were under orders to rescue only their own nationals, abandoning to their fate the hundreds of thousands of Greeks and Armenian refugees gathered on the quayside.

==== Heinz Richter ====
German historian Heinz A. Richter in his 2016 book The Greek–Turkish War 1919–1922, concluded that: "The two main culprits responsible for the atrocities that followed the capture of Smyrna by the Turks were the city's governor, General Nureddin Pasha, and his commander-in-chief, Mustafa Kemal, who was the one who appointed him to this position".

=== Turkish sources claiming Turkish responsibility ===
==== Falih Rıfkı Atay ====
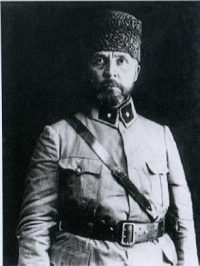
The commander of the Turkish First Army Mirliva "Sakallı" Nureddin Pasha

Falih Rıfkı Atay, a Turkish journalist and author of national renown, is quoted as having lamented that the Turkish army had burnt Smyrna to the ground in the following terms:

Gavur [infidel] İzmir burned and came to an end with its flames in the darkness and its smoke in daylight. Were those responsible for the fire really the Armenian arsonists as we were told in those days? ... As I have decided to write the truth as far as I know I want to quote a page from the notes I took in those days. 'The plunderers helped spread the fire ... Why were we burning down İzmir? Were we afraid that if waterfront konaks, hotels and taverns stayed in place, we would never be able to get rid of the minorities? When the Armenians were being deported in the First World War, we had burned down all the habitable districts and neighbourhoods in Anatolian towns and cities with this very same fear. This does not solely derive from an urge for destruction. There is also some feeling of inferiority in it. It was as if anywhere that resembled Europe was destined to remain Christian and foreign and to be denied to us.

If there were another war and we were defeated, would it be sufficient guarantee of preserving the Turkishness of the city if we had left Izmir as a devastated expanse of vacant lots? Were it not for Nureddin Pasha, whom I know to be a dyed-in-the-wool fanatic and rabblerouser, I do not think this tragedy would have gone to the bitter end. He has doubtless been gaining added strength from the unforgiving vengeful feelings of the soldiers and officers who have seen the debris and the weeping and agonized population of the Turkish towns which the Greeks have burned to ashes all the way from Afyon.

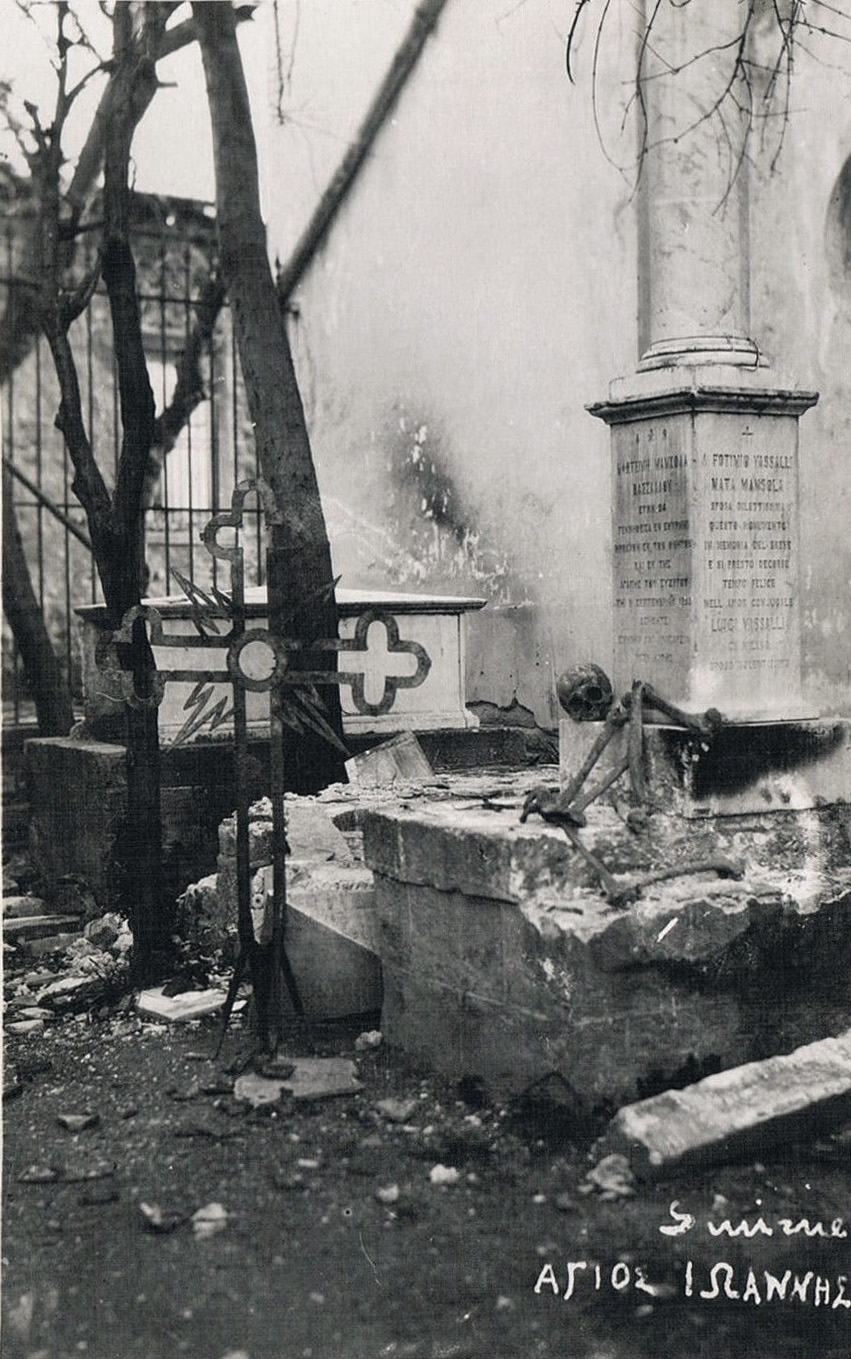
Desecrated graves at the Greek cemetery of Saint John

Falih Rifki Atay implied that Nureddin Pasha was the person responsible for the fire in his account: "At the time it was said that Armenian arsonists were responsible. But was this so? There were many who assigned a part in it to Nureddin Pasha, commander of the First Army, a man whom Kemal had long disliked..."

==== Professor Biray Kolluoğlu Kırlı ====
Biray Kolluoğlu Kırlı, a Turkish professor of sociology at Boğaziçi University, published a paper in 2005 in which she argues that Smyrna was burned by the Turkish Army to create a Turkish city out of the cosmopolitan fabric of the old city.

==== Reşat Kasaba's essay ====
Turkish historian Reşat Kasaba noted in a short essay that various pro-Turkish sources offer different and even contradicting explanations for this event. He lists some pro-Turkish accounts: Some of them completely ignore the event or they claim that there was not a fire at all. Additional pro-Turkish accounts claim that the Greeks had severed "all the rubber pipes of the fire brigade", while others suggest that there were many fires, some started by Christians and some by Turks, or that "actual culpability has never been proven" and finally some other pro-Turkish accounts place the blame violent Çetes as a way of clearing the regular nationalist army and the Ottoman and Turkish governments from any responsibility in the events surrounding the fire.

Kasaba later reports that Smyrna's fire brigade was underwritten by the London Insurance Company and included both non-Muslim and Muslim firefighters and adds that:

During the great fire, some from this brigade confronted the Turkish troops and accused them of torching the buildings while the firefighters were trying to put out the flames to which a soldier responded, "You have your orders and I have mine". According to one contemporary account, on 10 September, "the Turkish Military Governor, learning that there were still twelve Greeks in the fire department, ordered their immediate expulsion and arrest."

== Sources claiming Greek or Armenian responsibility ==
=== Contemporary newspapers and witnesses ===
==== Mustafa Kemal's telegram ====
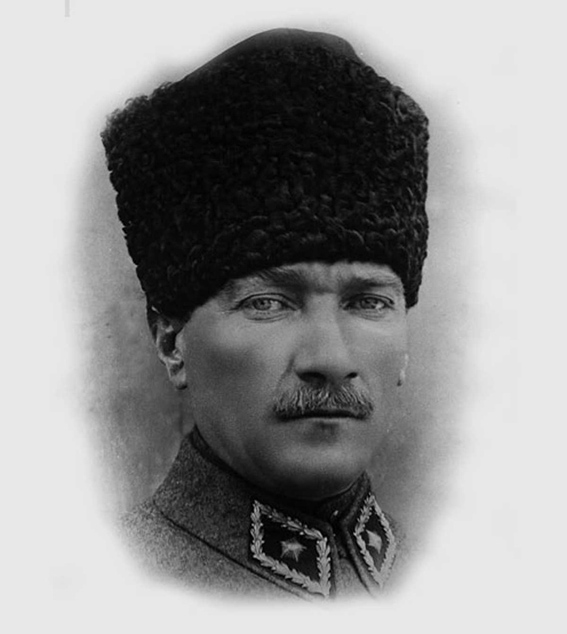
Commander-in-Chief of the TBMM government Müşir Mustafa Kemal Pasha

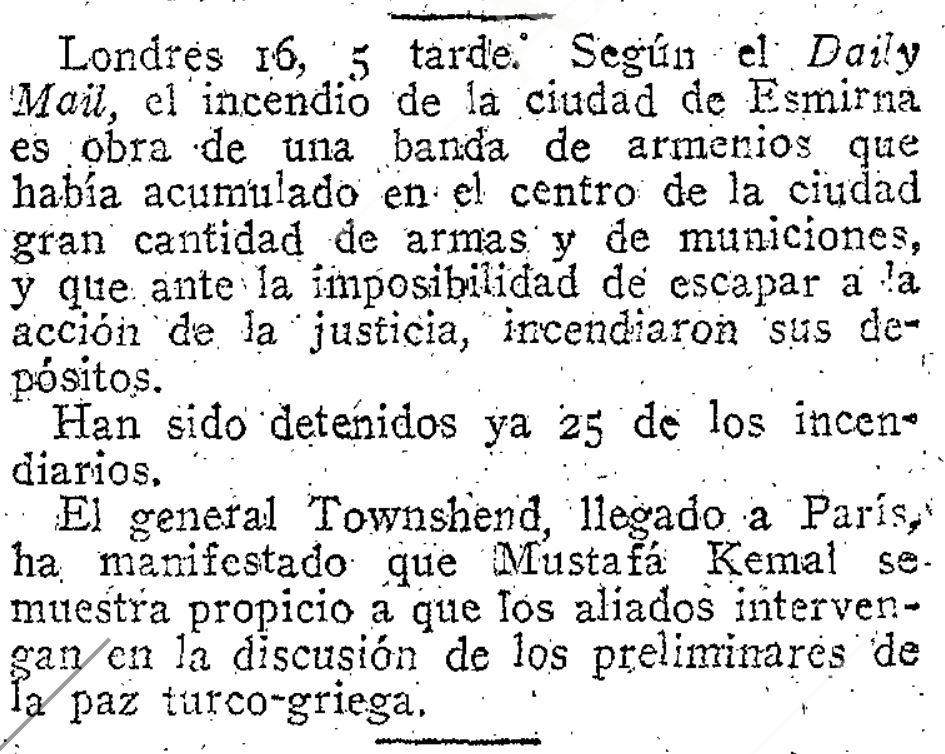
The Spanish newspaper ABC, on 17 September 1922: "The fire in the city of Smyrna is the work of an Armenian gang that had accumulated a large quantity of weapons and ammunition in the center of the city, and who, unable to escape justice, set fire to their deposits."

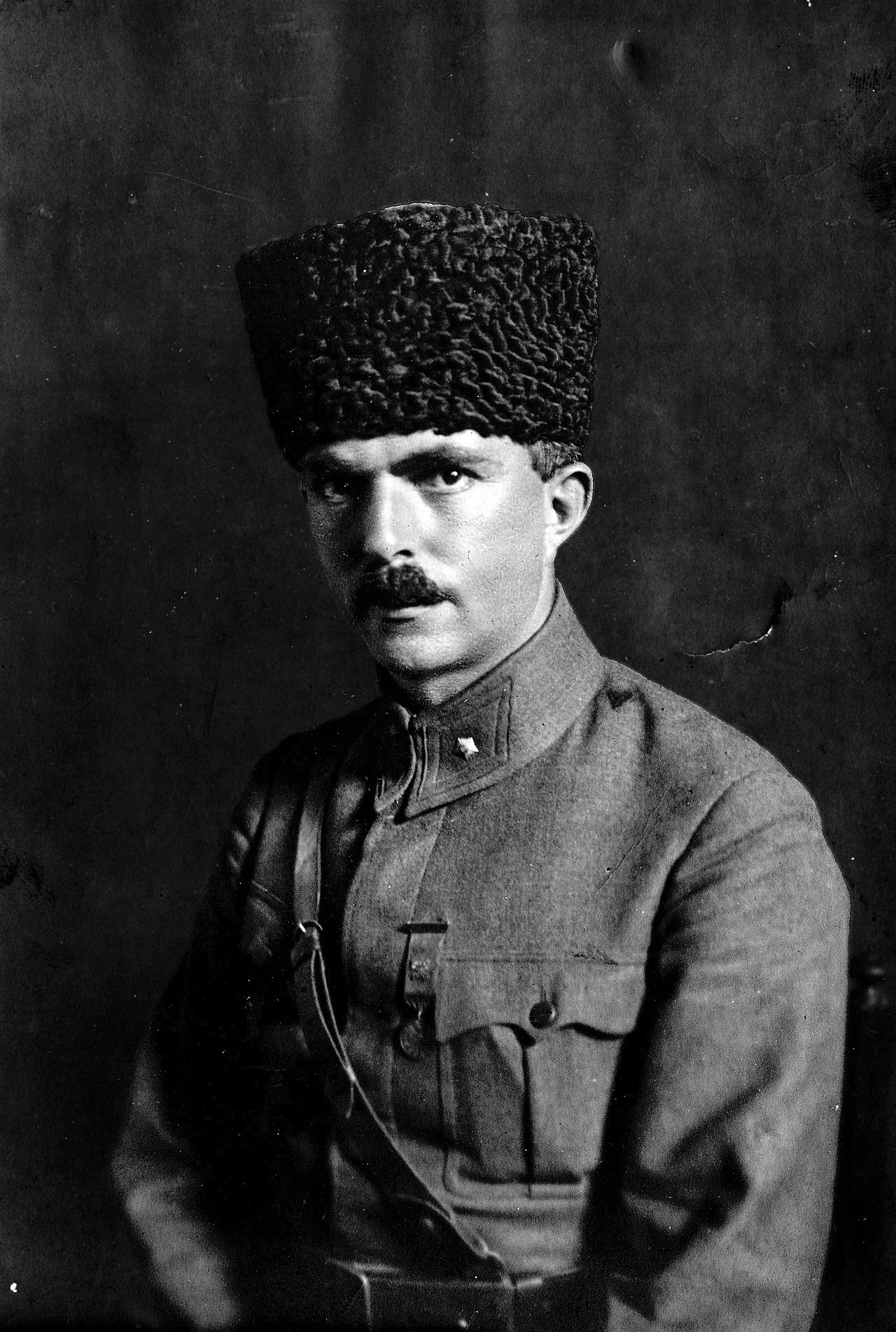
İzzettin (Çalışlar) Paşa during the Turkish War of Independence.

On 17 September, when the massacre and the fire in the city had come to an end, Mustafa Kemal Atatürk, future Turkish President and then-Commander-in-Chief of the Turkish armies, sent the Minister of Foreign Affairs Yusuf Kemal the following telegram, describing the official version of events in the city:

FROM COMMANDER IN CHIEF GAZI MUSTAFA KEMAL PASHA TO THE MINISTER OF FOREIGN AFFAIRS YUSUF KEMAL BEY

Tel. 17.9.38 (1922) (Arrived 4.10.38)

To be transmitted with care. Important and urgent.

Find hereunder the instruction I sent to Hamid Bey with Admiral Dumesmil, who left for İstanbul today.

Commander-In-Chief

Mustafa KEMAL

Copy To Hamid Bey,

1. It is necessary to comment on the fire in İzmir for future reference.

Our army took all the necessary measures to protect İzmir from accidents, before entering the city. However, the Greeks and the Armenians, with their pre-arranged plans have decided to destroy İzmir. Speeches made by Chrysóstomos at the churches have been heard by the Muslims, the burning of İzmir was defined as a religious duty. The destruction was accomplished by this organization. To confirm this, there are many documents and eyewitness accounts. Our soldiers worked with everything that they have to put out the fires. Those who attribute this to our soldiers may come to İzmir personally and see the situation. However, for a job like this, an official investigation is out of the question. The newspaper correspondents of various nationalities presently in İzmir are already executing this duty. The Christian population is treated with good care and the refugees are being returned to their places.

A pro-Kemalist French journalist, Berthe Georges-Gaulis, who had covered the Turkish War of Independence, arrived in Smyrna shortly after the flames had died down. She wrote:

The first defeat of the nationalists had been this enormous fire. Within forty-eight hours, it had destroyed the only hope of immediate economic recovery. For this reason, when I heard people accusing the winners themselves of having provoked it to get rid of the Greeks and Armenians who still lived in the city, I could only shrug off the absurdity of such talk. One had to know the Turkish leaders very little indeed to attribute to them so generously a taste for unnecessary suicide.

Salih Bozok, a lifelong friend of Atatürk, gave an account of his experiences and observations accompanying Kemal in Smyrna to the Turkish newspaper Cumhuriyet, which published the interview on 30 January 1939. He states that Kemal entered the city on 10 September, greeted by representatives of the local community. The fire erupted shortly after a place of residence was chosen for Kemal and his entourage, forcing them to relocate. Bozok puts the blame for the fire on "arsonists" without specifying their ethnicity. The interview includes a transcription of the conversation between Kemal and his future wife Latife Uşşaki as they watched the fire from distance:

Atatürk asked Lady Latife:

"In the area affected by the fire, is there any estate that belongs to you?"

Lady Latife replied:

"An important part of our estate is in the burning area!"

Then she added with great enthusiasm:

"My Pasha... Even if all of it burns... you being alive is enough. What value would property have for people who see these happy days? The nation has been saved, after all. We can rebuild them later, and in a more perfect form!"

Atatürk really liked this answer. His eyes grew wet:

"Yes!" he roared. "Let [it] burn and crash down! Fixing all of it is possible!"

The conversation is further corroborated by a letter written by Uşşaki more than a month after the fire.

Kemal also pointed at the burning city, and declared it a "sign that Turkey is purged of the traitors, the Christians, and of the foreigners, and that Turkey is for the Turks".

In Kemal's later speech to the Grand National Assembly on 4 October 1922, and in his famous Nutuk speech in 1927, Kemal did not mention the fire at all. According to historian Biray Kolluoḡlu Kırlı, the elimination of the fire from these key speeches prepared the ground for wiping the episode out of the history of the new nation. Kemal only mentioned the fire briefly, once, in a 1923 speech, where he said:

Izmir was in flames and smoke. Everyone was sombre before this sad scene. They had tears in their eyes. However, upon brief inquiry I realized that these tears were not because of the fire and the devastation. This fire and this devastation did not have any influence on them..., their eyes were filled with tears from happiness because of witnessing our victorious army liberating them.

Historian Heinz A. Richter considers Mustafa Kemal to have been responsible for the atrocities during the burning.

==== İzzettin Çalışlar's Military Intelligence report ====
Military Governor of Smyrna after the 9th of September 1922 was the commander of the 1st Army Corps, Brigadier general İzzettin Çalışlar, a Greek-speaking Turkish officer and Mustafa Kemal Atatürk's Chief of Staff during the Turkish War of Independence, who was an eye-witness and present during and after the events. Within his Army Corps the only division that was allowed to enter Smyrna after the 10th of September was the 8th Infantry Division under the command of Major General Kâzım Sevüktekin. The 8th Infantry Division had lost nearly a battalion of its strength, 617 soldiers, 24 officers, as well as 86 war animals when they arrived in Smyrna on the evening of the 10th of September. Moreover, the Shock Battalion of the division was sent to protect Karşıyaka; an overwhelmingly Christian (Greek-Armenian-Levantine) neighborhood that was saved from the fire, where Turks were only 19% of the population in 1921. Its Artillery Battalion was spread outside the city center and was stationed in Naldöken, Yenikale, Abdullağa, Kadifekale against allied ships. The only military units that were in downtown during the fire were the reduced number of about more than 3 battalions of 189th and 131st Regiments, and one battalion (3rd Battalion) from the 135th Regiment; within the 8th division. Moreover, the Mounted Pursuit Company of the 1st Army Corps, along with the 57th Division of the Army Corps, was sent to pursue the remainder of the Greek troops under General Frangou in Çeşme; further reducing the number and animals of the division. Çalışlar wrote the following classified intelligence report on the 5th of October 1922 in Smyrna:

1st Army Corps Command

Intelligence

Number: 208/6122

5.10.1338 (1922)

İzmir

To the 1st Army Command

The great fire of Smyrna started on Wednesday, September the 13th, 38 (1922), at 14:15, from several points in the Armenian neighbourhood and continued until September the 15th. Neighbourhoods burned in this fire: Armenian neighbourhood, Çalgıcıbaşı, Ayadimitri (St. Demetrius), Ayakaterine (St. Catherine), Ayatrikona (St. Tryphon), Ayanikola (St. Nicholas), Mortakia, Hadji-Frangou neighbourhoods were burned wholly; Madamcani (aka Yenimahalle), Meyhaneboğazı, Fasolya, Plavmina, Frankish neighbourhoods and the First Kordon Ayavukla were partially burned. Type and quantity of burned buildings; approximately 20-25 thousand households, shops and stores. These include Smyrna Theatre, Grand Hotel Kraemer Palace, Smyrna Palace Hotel, İzmir (Ottoman) Post & Telegraph Office, Sporting Club, Café de Paris, French - Italian - British consulates, old Régie administration (Ottoman Tobacco Company), Ektayulo in the Frankish neighbourhood, Sherme, Bon Marche, Stein, Louvre department stores, Bakırcıyan and Papasyan warehouses, big business houses on Ayayorgi street, Çuha Bedesten, numerous large inns, Ferhanes (Caravanserais), big hotels around Passport, Athens, Salonica, Tunisia and Algeria (Orient Bank), Ottoman banks, Banco di Roma, Passport Office, Fasolya, Plavsina and Peştemalcılarbaşı police stations. In short: it includes the most prosperous and commercial part of the city. The sea front of the fire area is approximately 3200 meters and its depth from the sea is 5000 meters. The documents below indicate that this fire was deliberately started by Christians and especially Armenians, and all the documents are attached in the appendix.

1. The report of the 8th (Infantry) Division's Commander (Major General Kâzım Sevüktekin), who was the Commander of the Place at the time of the fire,

2. Reports of Monsieur Preskovic (Grescovich), Fire Brigade Commander of the Smyrna Insurance Companies,

3. The report of the (1st) Army Corps' Engineers Commander,

4. The handwritten report in French based on observations of German Monsieur Max Rozembleh, the American Kers company broker, a resident in house number 3 on Alyonti boulevard in Punta,

5. A joint report in French based on the observations of the tobacco merchant Monsieur Billişaber, an Italian subject, resident in Second Kordon, house number 34, in Izmir, and Monsieur Basil Rerku, a French subject, who lives in the same neighbourhood,

6. The report in French by Monsieur Zame M. Milyaki, from the commercial branch of the Crédit Français Algérien bank of the Esen Européen trading company, a French subject.

Apart from these, the following points also indicate that the fire was made by Christians:

1. As can be found in the Intelligence files of the 1st Army, Papoulas, the former Commander-in-Chief of the Greek Army, had publicly stated in his speech at an important meeting in the church of Ayafotini that "if they have to leave Anatolia, they will burn everywhere and leave it in ruins and ashes". This issue was even mentioned in newspaper columns. As a matter of fact, the withdrawal of the Greek Army by burning the cities, towns and villages that it evacuated from Afyonkarahisar to İzmir continuously tells that it acted within a systematic plan that was thought out and finalized beforehand, and that the burning of İzmir would naturally take place in this plan.

2. While trying to extinguish the fire in the area where the fire broke out, fires broke out from other places as well. For example, the Commander of the 3rd Battalion of 135th Regiment within the 8th Infantry Division, regarding the fire that broke out from the Athens Bank warehouse around Yemişçiler district on the night of 13/14 September 338 (1922), stated that "first of all, three gunshots and a bomb explosion was heard, and when they ran towards the sound of gunfire and bombs, he saw five or six horsemen fleeing quickly." The looting of this warehouse, which was especially full of timber, indicates that the fire was deliberately set by traitors.

3. The selection of each of the successive fire places in such a way as to block the water spaces of the companies also indicates that they were carried out in accordance with a previously thought-out plan.

4. The fact that the enemy made such scorched-earth fires not only in this retreat, but also in the retreat from Sakarya last year, is proof that they were already determined to burn the places they left a long time ago, and this was not a new plan.

5. The people of the burned villages and towns that the Army corps encountered in the pursuit operation said that the fire was always made by Christians together with the Greek troops, and that those who tried to extinguish their burning houses were shot with bullets and burned alive by throwing them into the fire, and that the Greek soldiers formed a cordon around the villages and towns to prevent them from rescuing themselves from the fires.

1st Army Corps Commander

Mirliva (Brigadier General)

İzzeddin

=== Non-contemporary sources ===
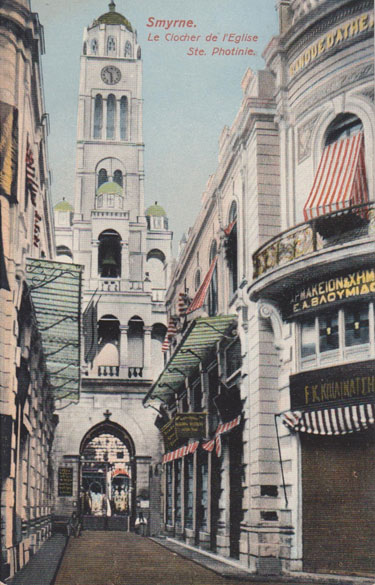
Belltower of the Greek Orthodox cathedral of Saint Fotini. It was intentionally blown up with dynamite by the Turkish authorities following the 15–20 September fire.

==== Donald Webster's version ====
According to US scholar Donald E. Webster, a "Turcophile" who taught at the International College in Izmir between 1931 and 1934:

All the world heard about the great fire which destroyed much of beautiful Izmir. While every partisan accuses enemies of the incendiarism, the preponderance of impartial opinion blames the terror-stricken Armenians, who had bet their money on the wrong horse – a separatist national rather than a cultural individuality within the framework of the new, laïque Turkey."

==== Turkish colonel Rachid Galib's claim ====
In an article published in Current History, Turkish Colonel Rachid Galib stated that Harry Harling Lamb, the British Consul General at Smyrna, reported that he "had reason to believe that Greeks in concert with Armenians had burned Smyrna".

However, Lamb actually reported that the Turks were the ones who deliberately burnt Smyrna and destroyed the city.

== Sources claiming joint Turkish and Armenian responsibility ==
=== Contemporary sources ===
==== Bilge Umar ====
Turkish author, researcher and jurist Bilge Umar, whose parents were witnesses to the event and long-time inhabitants of Smyrna, wrote in 1974 that both Turkish and the Armenian sides were guilty for the fire: "Turks and Armenians are equally to blame for this tragedy. All the sources show that the Greeks did not start the fire as they left the city. The fire was started by fanatical Armenians. The Turks did not try to stop the fire."

==== The "Grescovich report" ====
Paul Grescovich, an Austrian-born engineer and the chief of the Smyrna Fire Department, seen by Prentiss as "a thoroughly reliable witness", stated that the fire began in the Armenian quarter, after fighting between Armenian brigands and Turkish soldiers broke out. He reported that Smyrna had seen an abnormal amount of fires in the first week of September, some of which were arson cases. Once Turkish troops captured Smyrna, Gresovich asked for more men and equipment to fight the fires. The Turkish authorities didn't provide additional support immediately. They first arrested the Greek firemen, who made up about a fifth of Grescovich's force. The fire department went a few days with reduced staff. On the 11th and 12th, the Turkish army assisted the firefighters in extinguishing fires across the city.

At the same time, Grescovich reported, Armenians were caught setting fires. He stated especially that "his own firemen, as well as Turkish guards, had shot down many Armenian young men disguised either as women or as Turkish irregular soldiers, who were caught setting fires during Tuesday night [12 September] and Wednesday [13 September] morning". Prentiss reports Grescovich as stating that at least six fires were reported around freight terminal warehouses and the Adine railroad passenger station at 11:20, five more around the Turkish-occupied Armenian hospital at 12:00 and nearly at the same time at the Armenian Club, and several at the Cassaba railroad station. Grescovich then asked the military authorities for help, but got no assistance until 6 pm when he was given soldiers who, two hours later, started to blow up buildings to prevent the fire from spreading. Grescovich, however, also criticized the Turkish military for failing to prevent the fire and for responding to it negligently and ineffectively.

==== Criticism of the Grescovich report ====
The Grescovich Report has faced some criticism, including by Robert Shenk, a professor and retired captain in the U.S. Naval Reserve, who wrote that "any fire chief of a city utterly destroyed by fire might have many reasons to invent things in his report".

Turkish scholar Pelin Böke, notes that the report has not been published in any book in its original, whole, form and that it was either partly censored or mistranslated in the previous cases that it was quoted. Historian John Murat apparently references a version of the report which reads "GRESCOVICH REPORT Commander of the Smyrna Insurance Fire Brigade. Revealing the prearranged fire of Smyrna by the Turks. Constantinople 1922."

=== Non-contemporary sources ===
==== Lord Kinross's study ====
Echoing Umar's account, and devoting an entire chapter of his biography of Atatürk to the fire, Lord Kinross argues:

The internecine violence led, more or less by accident, to the outbreak of a catastrophic fire. Its origins were never satisfactorily explained. Kemal maintained to Admiral Dumesnil that it had been deliberately planned by an Armenian incendiary organization, and that before the arrival of the Turks speeches had been made in churches, calling for the burning of the city as a sacred duty. Fuel for the purpose had been found in the houses of Armenian women, and several incendiaries had been arrested. Others accused the Turks themselves of deliberately starting the fire under the orders or at least connivance of Nur-ed-Din Pasha, who had a reputation for fanaticism and cruelty. Most probably it started when the Turks, rounding up the Armenians to confiscate their arms, besieged a band of them in a building in which they had taken refuge. Deciding to burn them out, they set it alight with petrol, placing cordon of sentries around to arrest or shoot them as they escaped. Meanwhile the Armenians started other fires to divert the Turks from their main objective. The quarter was on the outskirts of the city. But a strong wind, for which they had not allowed, quickly carried flames towards the city. By the early evening several other quarters were on fire, and a thousand homes, built flimsily of lath and plaster, had been reduced to ashes. The flames were being spread by the looters, and doubtless also by Turkish soldiers, paying off scores. The fire brigade was powerless to cope with such a conflagration, and at Ismet's headquarters the Turks alleged that its hose pipes had been deliberately severed. Ismet himself chose to declare that the Greeks had planned to burn the city.

== Historiography ==
The Scotsman (18 September 1922) describing the burning of Smyrna, including the looting of churches, schools and foreign consulates, the discovery of mutilated and burned bodies, and the rape and massacre of women and girls

Turkish sources mostly attribute responsibility to Greeks or Armenians, and vice versa. Other sources, on the other hand, suggest that at the very least, Turkish inactivity played a significant part on the event. There is a historical consensus that the fire was caused by Turkish soldiers in order to completely eradicate the Christian presence in Anatolia.

A number of studies have been published on the Smyrna fire. Professor of literature Marjorie Housepian Dobkin's 1971 study Smyrna 1922 concluded that the Turkish army systematically burned the city and killed Christian Greek and Armenian inhabitants. Her work is based on extensive eyewitness testimony from survivors, Allied troops sent to Smyrna during the evacuation, foreign diplomats, relief workers, and Turkish eyewitnesses. A study by historian Niall Ferguson comes to the same conclusion. Historian Richard Clogg categorically states that the fire was started by the Turks following their capture of the city. In his book Paradise Lost: Smyrna 1922, Giles Milton addresses the issue of the Smyrna Fire through original material (interviews, unpublished letters, and diaries) from the Levantine families of Smyrna, who were mainly of British origin. The conclusion of the author is that it was Turkish soldiers and officers who set the fire, most probably acting under direct orders. British scholar Michael Llewellyn-Smith, writing on the Greek administration in Asia Minor, also concluded that the fire was "probably lit" by the Turks as indicated by what he called "what evidence there is." Some, including Süleyman Külçe and Tessa Hofmann, blame Nureddin Pasha, in particular, for ordering the fire.

Stanford historian Norman Naimark has evaluated the evidence regarding the responsibility of the fire. He agrees with the view of American Lieutenant Merrill that it was in Turkish interests to terrorize Greeks into leaving Smyrna with the fire, and points out to the "odd" fact that the Turkish quarter was spared from the fire as a factor suggesting Turkish responsibility. He also points out that arguments can be made that burning the city was against Turkish interests and was unnecessary and that responsibility may lie with Greeks and/or Armenians as they "had own their good reasons", pointing out to the "Greek history of retreating" and "Armenian attack in the first day of the occupation". However, the Greek army departed from Smyrna on 9 September 1922, when Mustafa Kemal Atatürk and his army entered the city, while the fire began four days later, on 13 September 1922. Nevertheless, Naimark concludes that "the fire almost assuredly was purposely set by the Turkish troops".

Horton and Housepian are criticized by Heath W. Lowry and Justin McCarthy, who argue that Horton was highly prejudiced and Housepian makes an extremely selective use of sources. Lowry and McCarthy were both members of the now defunct Institute of Turkish Studies and have in turn been strongly criticized by other scholars for their denial of the Armenian Genocide and McCarthy has been described by Michael Mann as being on "the Turkish side of the debate."

Turkish author and journalist Falih Rıfkı Atay, who was in Smyrna at the time, and the Turkish professor Biray Kolluoğlu Kırlı agreed that Turkish nationalist forces were responsible for the destruction of Smyrna in 1922. More recently, a number of non-contemporary scholars, historians, and politicians have added to the history of the events by revisiting contemporary communications and histories. Leyla Neyzi, in her work on the oral history regarding the fire, makes a distinction between Turkish nationalist discourse and local narratives. In the local narratives, she points to the Turkish forces being held responsible for at least not attempting to extinguish the fire effectively, or, at times, being held responsible for the fire itself.

== See also ==
- List of massacres in Turkey
