= Çağdaş (İzmir Metro) =

General information
- Location: Bahçelerarası Mah., 35330; Balçova
- Coordinates: 38.394545°N 27.045412°E
- System: İzmir Metro rapid transit station
- Owner: İzmir Metropolitan Municipality
- Operator: İzmir Metro A.Ş.
- Line: M1
- Platforms: 1 island platform
- Tracks: 2
- Connections: ESHOT Bus: 5, 6, 7, 8, 82, 305, 311, 321, 510, 551, 650, 811, 909, 971, 975, 981, 982, 983, 984, 985, 987

Construction
- Parking: No
- Cycle facilities: No
- Accessible: Yes

History
- Opened: 24 February 2024; 2 years ago
- Electrified: 750V DC Third rail

Services
Preceding station	İzmir Metro	Following station
Dokuz Eylül Üniversitesi Hastanesi towards Narlıdere Kaymakamlık	M1	Balçova towards Evka 3
Location

Çağdaş is an underground station on the M1 Line of the İzmir Metro in Balçova. Located under Mithatpaşa Avenue, it has one island platform servicing two tracks. The station was opened on 24 February 2024, after almost 6 years of construction.

== History ==
Construction of the seven station expansion of the subway line, west from Fahrettin Altay, began on 9 June 2018 with completion expected by December 2021. Çağdaş was opened on 24 February 2024, along with five other stations on the extension.

== Connections ==
ESHOT operates city bus services on Mithatpaşa Avenue.

ESHOT Bus service
Route number	Stop	Route	Location
5	Teleferik	Narlıdere — Üçkuyular İskele	Mithatpaşa Avenue
6	Teleferik	Arıkent — Üçkuyular İskele	Mithatpaşa Avenue
7	Teleferik	Sahilevleri — Üçkuyular İskele	Mithatpaşa Avenue
8	Teleferik	Güzelbahçe — Fahrettin Altay Aktarma	Mithatpaşa Avenue
82	Teleferik	Siteler — Fahrettin Altay Aktarma	Mithatpaşa Avenue
305	Teleferik	2. İnönü Mahallesi — Fahrettin Altay Aktarma	Mithatpaşa Avenue
311	Teleferik	İnciraltı — Fahrettin Altay	Mithatpaşa Avenue
321	Teleferik	Çamlı Mahallesi — Fahrettin Altay Aktarma	Mithatpaşa Avenue
510	Teleferik	Gaziemir — Balçova	Mithatpaşa Avenue
551	Teleferik	Narlıdere — Fahrettin Altay Aktarma	Mithatpaşa Avenue
650	Teleferik	Fuar İzmir — Balçova	Mithatpaşa Avenue
811	Teleferik	Engelliler Merkezi — Montrö	Mithatpaşa Avenue
909	Teleferik	Zeytinalanı — Fahrettin Altay Aktarma	Mithatpaşa Avenue
971	Teleferik	Narbel — Fahrettin Altay Aktarma	Mithatpaşa Avenue
975	Teleferik	Seferihisar — Fahrettin Altay Aktarma	Mithatpaşa Avenue
981	Teleferik	Balıklıova — Fahrettin Altay Aktarma	Mithatpaşa Avenue
982	Teleferik	İYTE — Fahrettin Altay Aktarma	Mithatpaşa Avenue
983	Teleferik	Bademler — Fahrettin Altay Aktarma	Mithatpaşa Avenue
984	Teleferik	Urla — Fahrettin Altay Aktarma	Mithatpaşa Avenue
985	Teleferik	Seferihisar — Fahrettin Altay Aktarma	Mithatpaşa Avenue
987	Teleferik	Ürkmez — Fahrettin Altay Aktarma	Mithatpaşa Avenue

== Station layout ==
S	Street level	Exit/entrance, buses
M	Mezzanine level	Ticket machines, turnstiles
P Platform level	Westbound	← toward Kaymakamlık (Dokuz Eylül Üniversitesi Hastanesi)
P Platform level	Island platform, doors will open on the left
P Platform level	Eastbound	toward Evka 3 (Balçova) →
