= Ken Gorbey =

New Zealand museum director and consultant (born 1942)

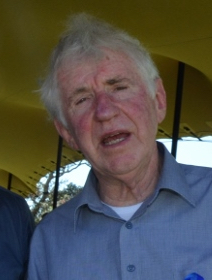
Gorbey in 2014

Kenneth Coulton Gorbey CNZM (born 1942) is a New Zealand museum director and consultant. He has designed and created exhibitions at the Museum of New Zealand Te Papa Tongarewa and the Jewish Museum Berlin.

== Early life ==
Gorbey was born in 1942 and grew up in Maungatautari. He studied at the University of Auckland where he graduated with a Master of Arts degree in archaeology.

== Career ==
Gorbey commenced his career with the New Zealand Historic Places Trust in 1968 by conducting an archaeological survey of the Kapuni natural gas pipeline route.

From 1971 to 1983, he was director of the Waikato Museum in Hamilton. From there he became Director of the Museum Project and head of exhibition planning for the new Museum of New Zealand Te Papa Tongarewa (Te Papa) where he worked with Cliff Whiting, Jock Phillips, Cheryl Sotheran and Nigel Cox. He held that position for 15 years.

In 1999, he was engaged by Mike Blumenthal to design the exhibitions for the Jewish Museum Berlin, where he became project director and deputy president. His vision was to create a museum that did not concentrate solely on the Holocaust, but told Jewish history using storytelling and as "magical theatre". To this end he hired his colleague from Te Papa, writer Nigel Cox, to work with him.

Since 1984, Gorbey has continued to work as a consultant on museum projects.

== Honours and awards ==
In the 2007 Queen's Birthday Honours, Gorbey was appointed a Companion of the New Zealand Order of Merit, for services to museums.

== Selected works ==
- Gorbey, Ken (February 1998). "Design definitions". Architecture New Zealand. Special issue: 20–21.
