= Responsibility (novel) =

2005 novel by Nigel Cox

- Author: Nigel Cox
- Language: English
- Publication date: 2005
- Publication place: New Zealand

Responsibility is a novel by New Zealand author Nigel Cox, published by Victoria University Press in 2005.

The novel is set in contemporary Berlin, and tells the story of an expatriate New Zealander who, whilst working as a consultant for German museums, becomes embroiled in criminal activity out of boredom. The novel is notable for combining noir and detective fiction clichés with comedy, as well as having a serious emotional centre.

Much of the book's source material is drawn from Nigel Cox's own experiences living in Berlin, and working at the Jewish Museum there, between 2000 and 2005.

== See also ==
- Dirty Work (New Zealand novel)
