= Waikato Museum =

Museum in Hamilton, New Zealand

Coordinates: 37°47′23″S 175°17′09″E

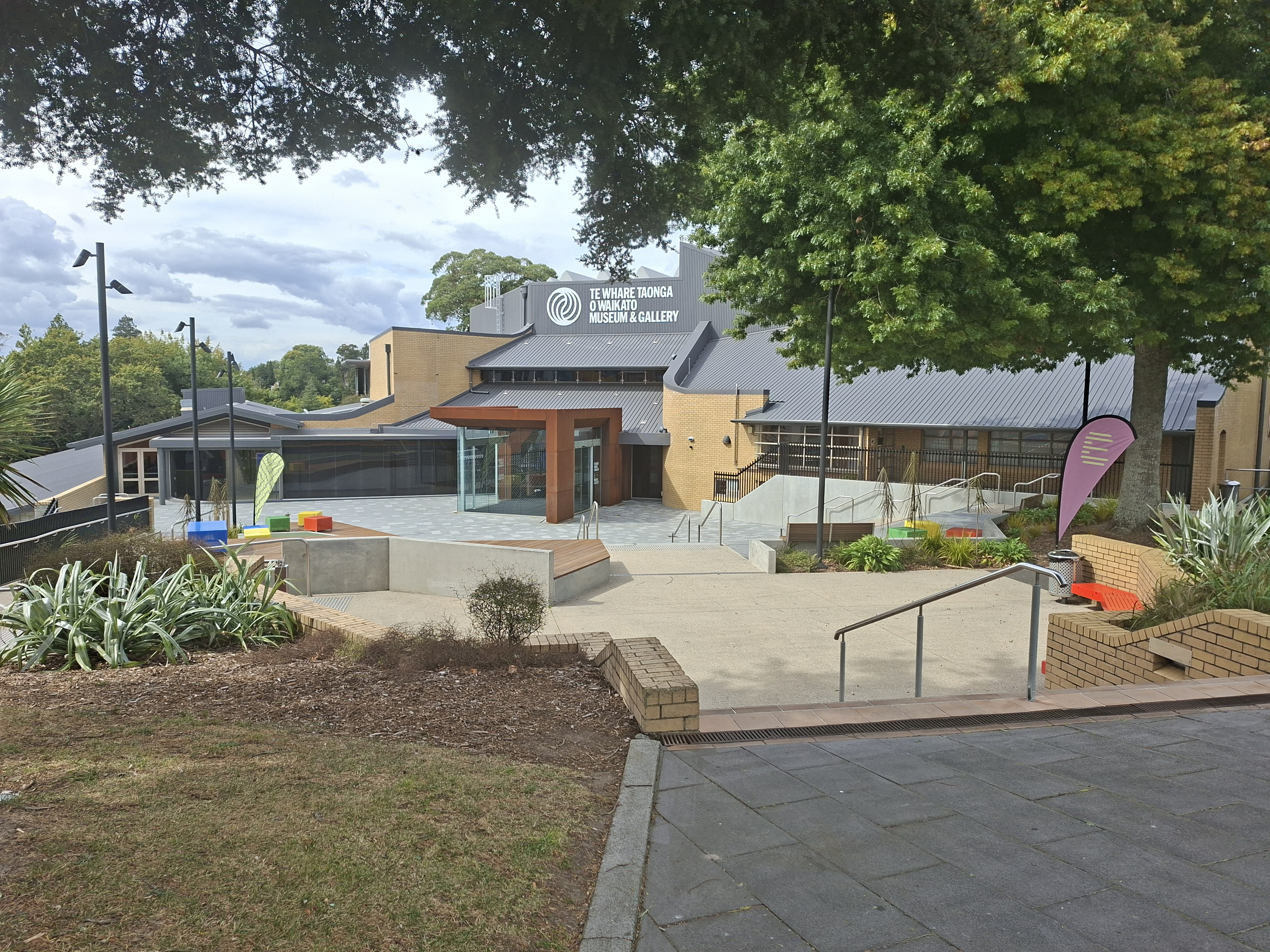
The front entrance and courtyard of Te Whare Taonga o Waikato Museum & Gallery

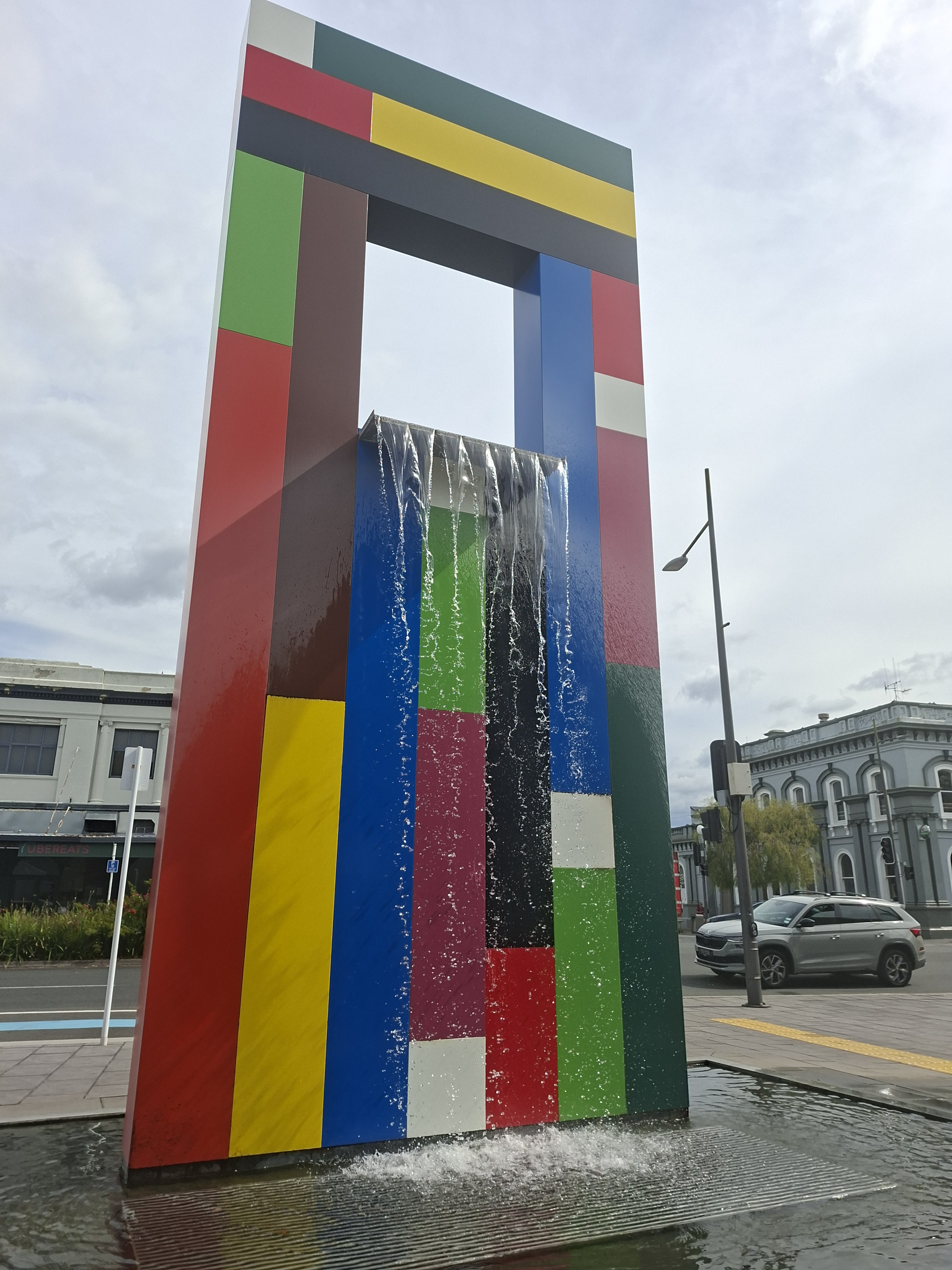
'Tongue of the Dog' sculpture by Michael Parekōwhai sits directly outside the museum.

Te Whare Taonga o Waikato Museum & Gallery (Māori: Te Whare Taonga o Waikato) is a regional museum located in Hamilton, New Zealand. The museum is managed by the Hamilton City Council. Outside the museum is The Tongue of The Dog, a sculpture by Michael Parekōwhai that has helped to increase visitor numbers. The sculpture was commissioned by MESH Sculpture Trust, Hamilton.

The museum's most popular attraction is Te Winika, the waka taua that was restored after being buried in the peat bogs for almost a century. This was to protect it from Gustav von Tempsky, who was known as "the waka-breaker".

== Building and history ==
The current Waikato Museum building is located at 1 Grantham Street in Hamilton's central business district on the west bank of the Waikato River. It was designed by Ivan Mercep of the Auckland architectural firm JASMad Group Ltd (now named Jasmax), who later designed Te Papa.

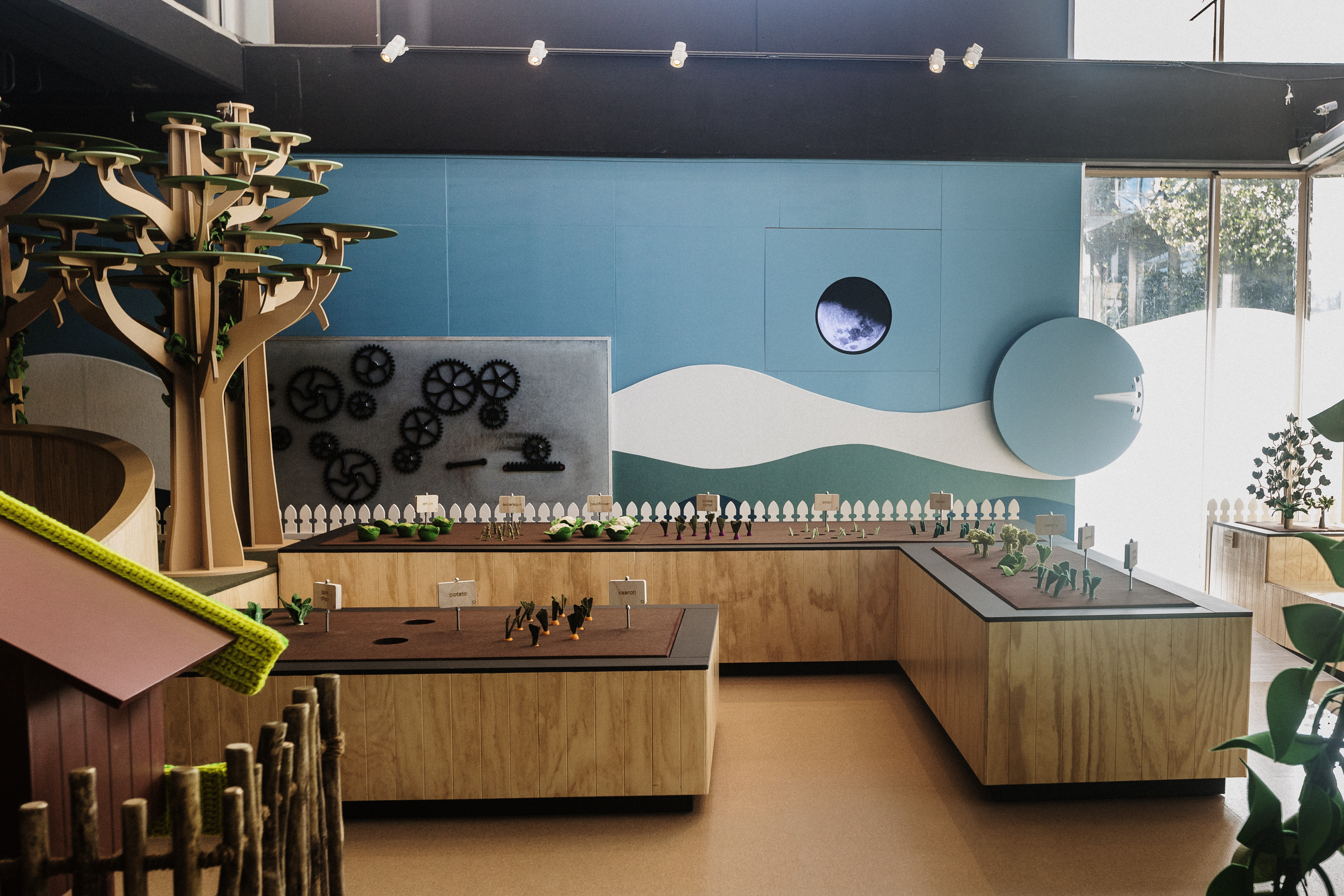
Part of Exscite – the children's science learning area at the museum. Part of Exscite – the children's science learning area at the museum.

Waikato Museum of Art and History opened in its current building in 1987. The event was the culmination of years of planning and debate surrounding the need for a combined regional museum and art gallery. The name of the institution has since been changed to Waikato Museum Te Whare Taonga O Waikato, to better reflect and honour the local iwi (tribe) Tainui. The museum is situated on Ngaati Wairere land, a haapuu (sub-tribe) of Waikato, Tainui. Of major significance to the museum's history is the Kiingitanga (the King Movement). The museum is kaitiaki or caretakers of taonga tuku iho (rare and sacred objects).

The interior and exterior of the museum building are inspired by and integrated with the environment. The design is oriented toward the steep riverbank on which the museum is situated. This approach is in keeping with Hamilton's long-term urban strategy to enhance its river frontage.

=== Museum directors ===
- Campbell Smith
- Ken Gorbey 1971–1983
- Bruce Robinson (1984 - 1995)
- Cherie Meecham
- Elizabeth Cotton
- Rachel Davies

== Exhibitions, education and public programmes ==
Waikato Museum offers a range of exhibitions (curated in-house and touring), as well as a full complement of education and public programmes. Waikato Museum's education, collections and research, and public programmes have four area of focus: art, social history, science, and tangata whenua. The overall aim of the institution is to reflect the passions, history, heritage and culture of the Waikato region.

Highlights for visitors include the majestic 200-year-old waka taua (war canoe) Te Winika and accompanying interpretation; Exscite the interactive science gallery for children; and Te Mauri o te Iwi, a sculptural interpretation of a traditional marae waharoa (entryway) by local artist Fred Graham.

In April 2015, the museum opened a major exhibition to mark the centenary of the World War I. Funded by a grant from the Lotteries Commission, For Us They Fell tells the untold stories of the Waikato men who served in the Great War and the families they left behind.

The museum offers a range of events including artist talks, workshops and a popular school holiday programme during each of the four mid-term holidays. From 2010 until 2020, the museum has hosted Bat Tours, supported by the Waikato Regional Council. Participants enjoy a presentation before being led on a tour to the bat-nesting site and can have encounters with longtailed bats, glow worms, shortfin eels and other native species.

Since 2006 Waikato Museum have hosted the National Contemporary Art Award (NCAA) that was started by the Waikato Society of Arts in 2000 (formally the award was called the Trust Waikato National Contemporary Art Awards). NCAA attracts entries from New Zealand artists both based in New Zealand and overseas. Past winners include Ayesha Green (2019), Boris Dornbusch (2007), Dieneke Jansen (2013) and Kim Pieters (2017).

== Landing ==
In 2021 a $1.03m floating pontoon on the Waikato River was opened, just below the museum. Its structure includes 5 decorated pou, representing stories from Ngāti Māhanga, Ngāti Tamainupō, Ngāti Wairere, Ngāti Korokī Kahukura and Ngāti Hauā. On 19 July 2021 a ferry began, linking the landing with Swarbrick's Landing, Braithwaite Park and Hamilton Gardens.
