= Nigel Cox (author) =

New Zealand writer (1951–2006)

- Born: 21 January 1951
- Died: 28 July 2006 (aged 55)
- Citizenship: New Zealand
- Occupations: Author and museum director

Nigel Cox ( 1951 January 13 – 2006 July 28 ) was a New Zealand author and museum director, with five novels published as of early 2006.

== Childhood and early career ==
Born in 1951 in Pahiatua, Cox grew up in the Wairarapa and Lower Hutt area. He worked in various jobs up until 1977; in the words of his author page on the Victoria University Press website, "His early working life reads like an author trying to find his way: advertising account executive, assembly line worker at Ford, deck hand, coalman, door-to-door turkey salesman, driver." Later, between 1977 and 1993, he worked as a bookseller in Auckland and Wellington.

== First novels ==
His first two novels, Waiting for Einstein (1984) and Dirty Work (1987) were both written while he was working in bookstores in Wellington and Auckland. Both these novels have Wellington settings.

For Dirty Work, Cox was awarded the Bucklands Memorial Literary Prize in 1988, as well as the 1991 Katherine Mansfield Memorial Fellowship. From 1995, he took up work as senior writer at the Museum of New Zealand Te Papa Tongarewa. He published a number of articles during this time, but did not produce any new novels.

== 2000–2006 ==
As of the publication of Skylark Lounge in 2000, Cox had not published a new novel since Dirty Work, thirteen years previously. The same year, he left New Zealand to join Ken Gorbey, his colleague at Te Papa, on the project team at the Jewish Museum Berlin. In 2001 he became the museum's Head of Exhibitions and Communications.

While in Berlin, Cox completed his fourth novel, Tarzan Presley (2004). The book was notable for fusing the life story of Elvis Presley and the fictional character Tarzan into a single original narrative. The book was nominated in the fiction category of the Montana New Zealand Book Awards in 2005, where it was judged runner-up, despite being embroiled in copyright controversy in the United States.

Cox returned to New Zealand in March 2005, rejoining Te Papa as Director – Experience. His fifth novel, Responsibility (2005), set in Berlin, combined elements from noir and detective fiction with a comedic edge. It was runner-up in the 2006 Montana New Zealand Book Awards.

In 2006, Dirty Work was republished by Victoria University Press.

On 28 July 2006, just four days after attending the Montana New Zealand Book Awards where he was the Fiction runner-up, he died due to cancer which he had had for some time. He was working on the final draft of a sixth novel, The Cowboy Dog, when he died. It was published in November 2006.

== Novels ==
- Waiting for Einstein (1984)
- Dirty Work (1987)
- Skylark Lounge (2000)
- Tarzan Presley (2004)
- Responsibility (2005)
- The Cowboy Dog (2006)

== See also ==
- Victoria University Press
