= Legal responsibility =

Responsibility, in the context of the law, may refer to:

- Legal obligation
- A measure of mental capacity, used in deciding the extent to which a person can be held accountable for a crime; see diminished responsibility.
- Specific duties imposed upon persons to care or provide for others, such as the parents' duty to the child or the guardianship of a ward.
- A person's role in causing an event to happen. A chain of causation means an individual is responsible for an event. This is part of the law of legal liability and public liability.

== See also ==
- Responsibility (disambiguation)
