= Dirty Work (Cox novel) =

1987 novel by Nigel Cox

- Author: Nigel Cox
- Language: English
- Genre: Novel
- Publication date: 1987
- Publication place: New Zealand

Dirty Work is a 1987 novel by New Zealand author Nigel Cox.

Set in Wellington City, New Zealand, the book revolves around the lives of staff and guests in a low-rent hotel, and the conflict between hotel owner Hendrick van Eesen ('Hendy') and his newly hired shift manager, Gina Tully.

The novel won the Bucklands Memorial Literary Prize shortly after its release, and was also optioned for film.

The book was re-published by Victoria University Press in 2006.

== Bibliography ==
Nigel Cox, Dirty Work, Victoria University Press: Wellington, NZ, 2006.
