= St. Stepanos Church =

Armenian church in İzmir, Turkey

Coordinates: 38°25′26″N 27°8′17″E

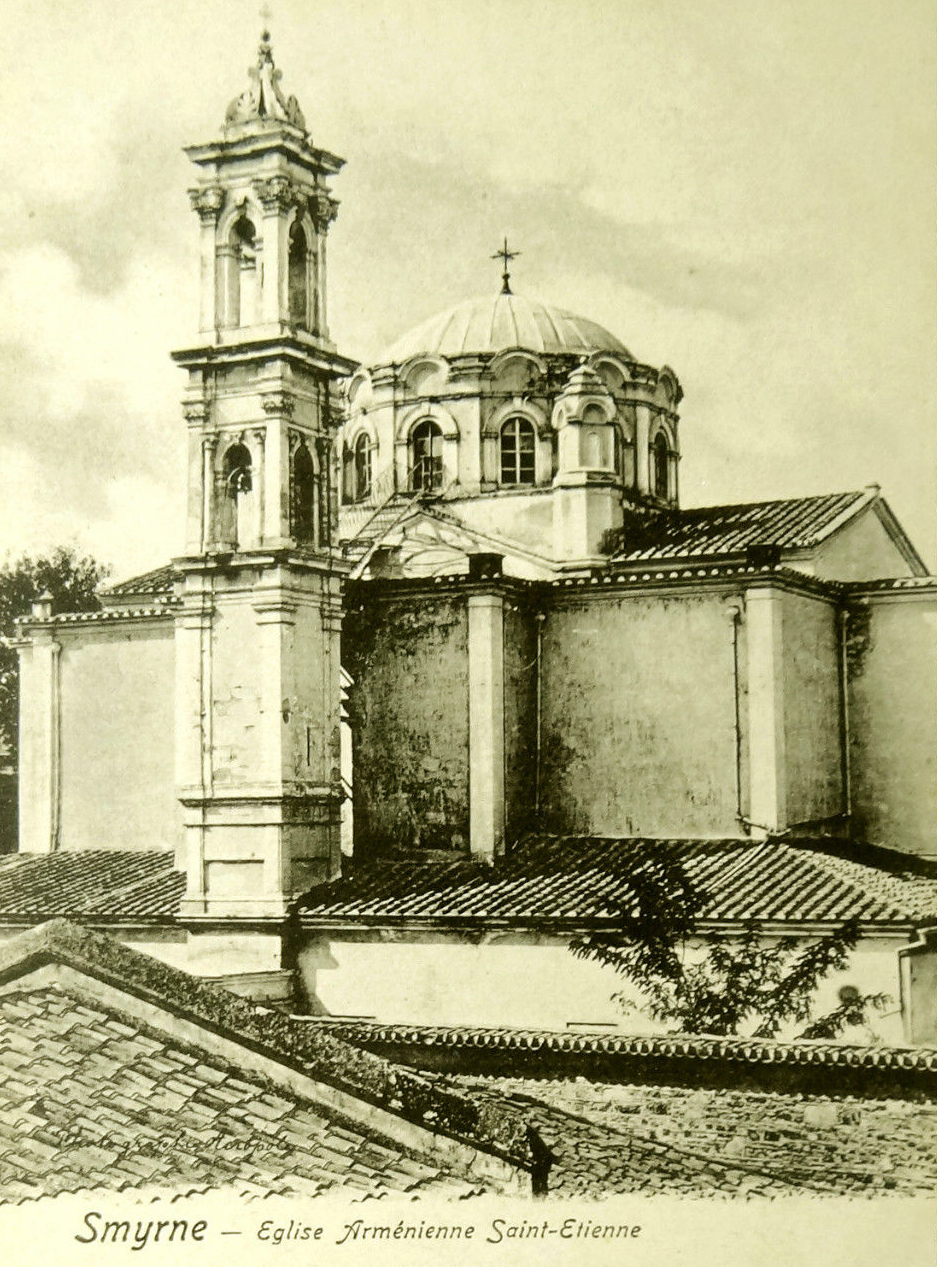
1907 French postcard depicting St. Stepanos Church.

The St. Stepanos Church (Armenian: Սուրբ Ստեփանոս եկեղեցի, romanized: Surb Stepanos yekeghetsi) was a historic Armenian church located in the Basmane district of the city of Smyrna (now İzmir), Turkey.

== Location and architecture ==
It was the most prominent Armenian church in the city, until it was destroyed by the Great Fire of Smyrna in 1922. The church was located in the Armenian quarter of the city and served the Armenian community along with the Surp Mesrop Boarding School for Boys and Surp Hripsime School for Girls. The schools were also located in the Basmane district. The church building was surrounded a huge yard and a high wall.

The church building build ca. 1863 was a basilica with a dome. The front of the temple portico was spacious and the church gate had bronze door panels with a large reliefs, one of them depicting the protomartyr Saint Stephen.

== Great Fire of Smyrna events ==
During the Great Fire of Smyrna, more than a thousand local Armenians, as well as a number of Greek, were barricaded in order to avoid atrocities committed by Turkish troops and irregulars. According to some estimates the number of civilians there reached 8,000, while 2,000 of them were children. Turkish troops attempted to destroy the walls by shooting with mortar fire. Finally most of the civilians were saved due to intervention by the metropolitan bishop of Ephesus. The latter informed the local Catholic bishop who managed to take the initiative to transfer the civilians to the Levantine quarter of the city. However, on the way, atrocities by Turkish troops were not avoided, many of the civilians were beaten, while a number was sent to concentration camps.

The church was looted by Turkish troops after the evacuation.
