= Narlıdere Kaymakamlık =

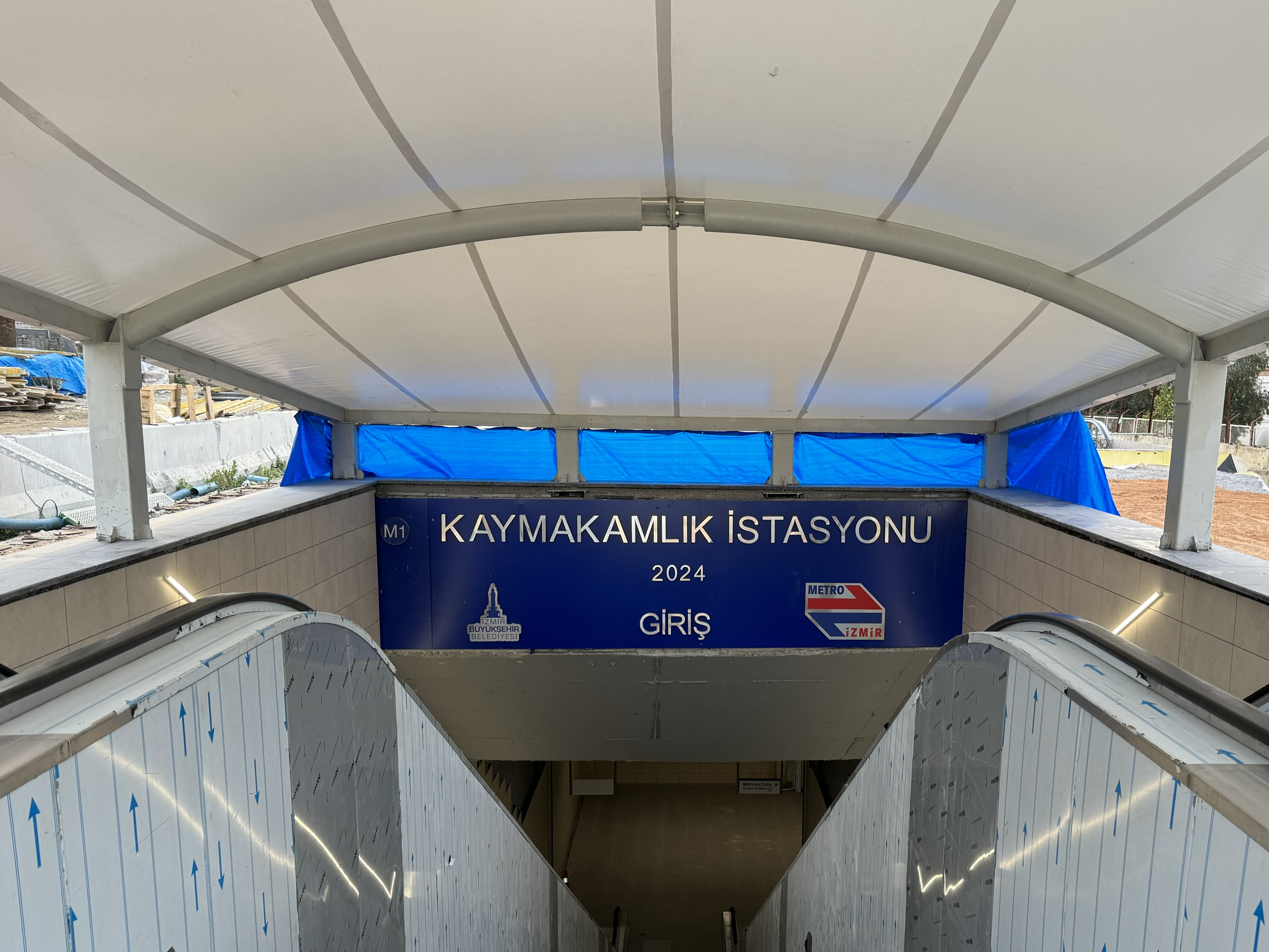
- Station entrance on Açelya Street

General information
- Other names: Kaymakamlık
- Location: Huzur Mah., 35320; Narlıdere
- Coordinates: 38.394996°N 26.991392°E
- System: İzmir Metro rapid transit station
- Owner: İzmir Metropolitan Municipality
- Operator: İzmir Metro A.Ş.
- Line: M1
- Platforms: 1 island platform
- Tracks: 2
- Connections: ESHOT Bus: 5, 8, 82, 321, 551, 909, 975, 981, 982, 983, 984, 985, 987

Construction
- Parking: Yes
- Cycle facilities: No
- Accessible: Yes

History
- Opened: 4 March 2024; 2 years ago
- Electrified: 750V DC Third rail

Services
Preceding station	İzmir Metro	Following station
Terminus	M1	100. Yıl Cumhuriyet Şehitlik; towards Evka 3
Location

Narlıdere Kaymakamlık is the western terminus of the İzmir Metro's only operating line, the M1. Located near the Narlıdere District Governorship Building, the station has one island platform servicing two tracks. The station was opened on 4 March 2024, after almost 6 years of construction.

== History ==
Construction of the seven station expansion of the subway line, west from Fahrettin Altay, began on 9 June 2018 with completion expected by December 2021. The first six stations on the extension were completed on 24 February 2024, with the last station, Narlıdere Kaymakamlık, opening its doors on 4 March 2024.

A parking lot with a capacity of 33 vehicles will be built near the station.

== Connections ==
ESHOT operates city bus services on Mithatpaşa Avenue and Açelya Street.

ESHOT Bus service
Route number	Stop	Route	Location
5	Narlıdere Huzur	Narlıdere — Üçkuyular İskele	Açelya Street
8	Narlıdere Kaymakamlık	Güzelbahçe — Fahrettin Altay Aktarma	Mithatpaşa Avenue
82	Narlıdere Kaymakamlık	Siteler — Fahrettin Altay Aktarma	Mithatpaşa Avenue
321	Narlıdere Kaymakamlık	Çamlı Mahallesi — Fahrettin Altay Aktarma	Mithatpaşa Avenue
551	Narlıdere Kaymakamlık	Narlıdere — Fahrettin Altay Aktarma	Mithatpaşa Avenue
909	Narlıdere Kaymakamlık	Zeytinalanı — Fahrettin Altay Aktarma	Mithatpaşa Avenue
975	Narlıdere Kaymakamlık	Seferihisar — Fahrettin Altay Aktarma	Mithatpaşa Avenue
981	Narlıdere Kaymakamlık	Balıklıova — Fahrettin Altay Aktarma	Mithatpaşa Avenue
982	Narlıdere Kaymakamlık	İYTE — Fahrettin Altay Aktarma	Mithatpaşa Avenue
983	Narlıdere Kaymakamlık	Bademler — Fahrettin Altay Aktarma	Mithatpaşa Avenue
984	Narlıdere Kaymakamlık	Urla — Fahrettin Altay Aktarma	Mithatpaşa Avenue
985	Narlıdere Kaymakamlık	Seferihisar — Fahrettin Altay Aktarma	Mithatpaşa Avenue
987	Narlıdere Kaymakamlık	Ürkmez — Fahrettin Altay Aktarma	Mithatpaşa Avenue

== Station layout ==
S	Street level	Exit/entrance, buses
M	Mezzanine level	Ticket machines, turnstiles
P Platform level	Westbound	Terminus, passenger drop-off only
P Platform level	Island platform, doors will open on the left
P Platform level	Eastbound	toward Evka 3 (100. Yıl Cumhuriyet Şehitlik) →
