= Narlıdere =

- District and municipality
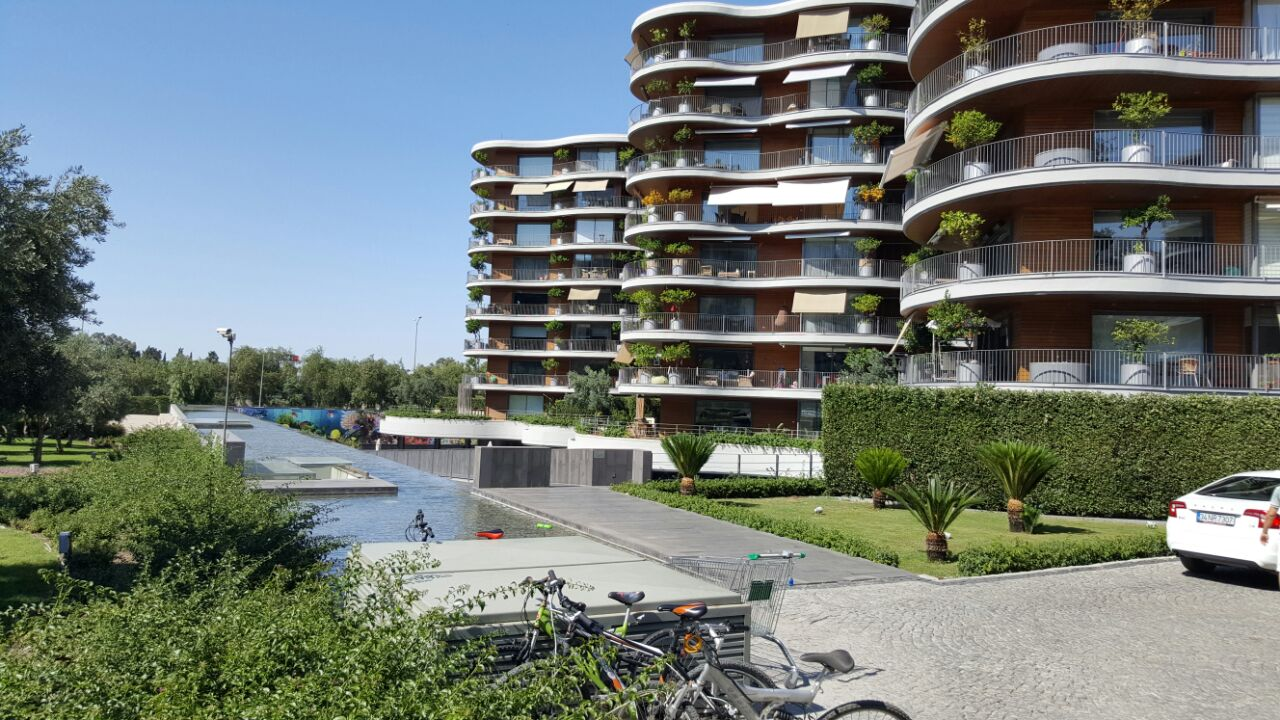

- Map showing Narlıdere District in İzmir Province

- Location within Turkey Location within İzmir
- Coordinates: 38°23′28″N 27°00′10″E
- Country: Turkey
- Province: İzmir

Government
  - Mayor: Erman Uzun (CHP)
- Area: 50 km^{2} (19 sq mi)
- Population (2022): 62,923
  - Density: 1,300/km^{2} (3,300/sq mi)
- Time zone: UTC+3 (TRT)
- Postal code: 35320
- Area code: 0232
- Website: www.narlidere-bld.gov.tr

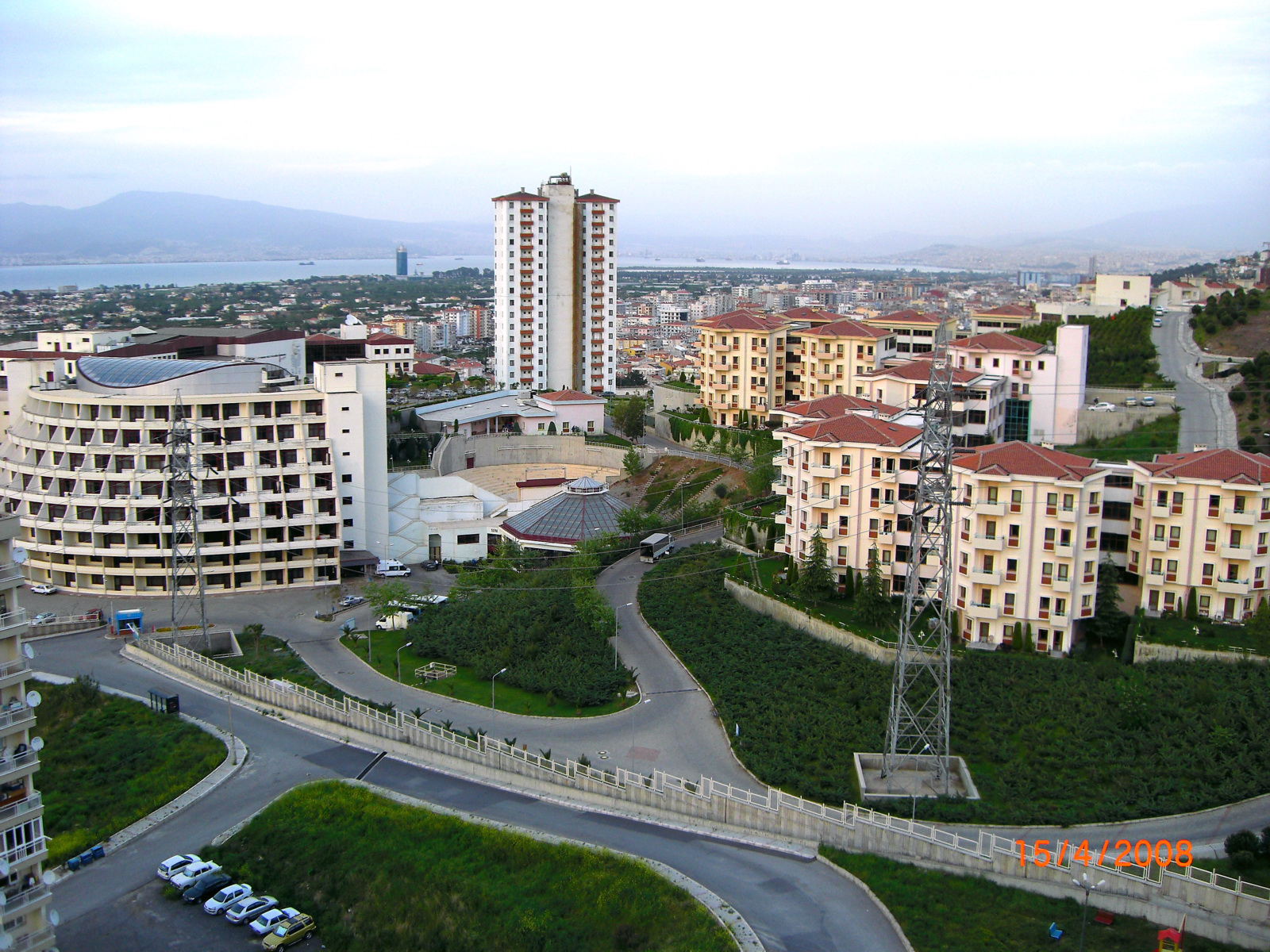
Narlıdere Nursing Home

Narlıdere is a municipality and district of İzmir Province, Turkey. Its area is 50 km^{2}, and its population is 62,923 (2022). It is fully (100%) urbanized. Narlıdere district area follows the southern coastline of the inner Gulf of İzmir. Narlıdere center is at a distance of 10 km (6 mi) to the west from the traditional center of İzmir (Konak). Narlıdere district area neighbors the district areas of Balçova to the east, Menderes to the south and Güzelbahçe to the west, this last also being westernmost among İzmir's metropolitan districts. Narlıdere district's overall levels of education are among the highest in Turkey, the literacy rate reaching 93 per cent, while the calculations for average yearly income per inhabitant situate Narlıdere rather below the national average, at 2.393 US Dollars, for which its open approach to outside immigration may have played a role. The overall appearance of Narlıdere leaves the impression of a locality where people are generally educated and who subsist on mid- to low-level revenues without being destitute.

== History ==
Narlıdere was founded as a village by semi-nomadic Tahtacı–Alevi Turkmens in the 18th century, whose descendants still constitute the backbone of the population, preserving their particular popular culture and folklore, and maintaining their recently restored seminary, called Cemevi. During the Greek Uprising, Greek pirates from Samos kidnapped these Tahtacı Türkmens for ransom from their relatives day and night and also stole animals and other property as there were no troops in the coast between İzmir and Urla. An Ottoman Archival document from the Porte in February 1825 to Hasan Pasha, Castellan of İzmir, make the distinction and use the word "Türkmen" instead of Türk" The economy is still largely based on agriculture (especially citrus fruit and flowers), although new housing projects putting Narlıdere's advantageous location to benefit and generally aimed at high-income residents started to be built in recent years, and there is a five-star hotel. As such, Narlıdere became in recent years one of İzmir's metropolitan districts where the economy grew the fastest.

Narlidere is home to the Turkish Army Combat Engineering School & Training Center.

== Composition ==
There are 11 neighbourhoods in Narlıdere District:

- 2. Inönü
- Altıevler
- Atatürk
- Çamtepe
- Çatalkaya
- Huzur
- Ilıca
- Limanreis
- Narlı
- Sahil Evleri
- Yenikale
