= İzmir =

City in the Aegean region of Turkey

İzmir Smyrna
- City and metropolitan municipality
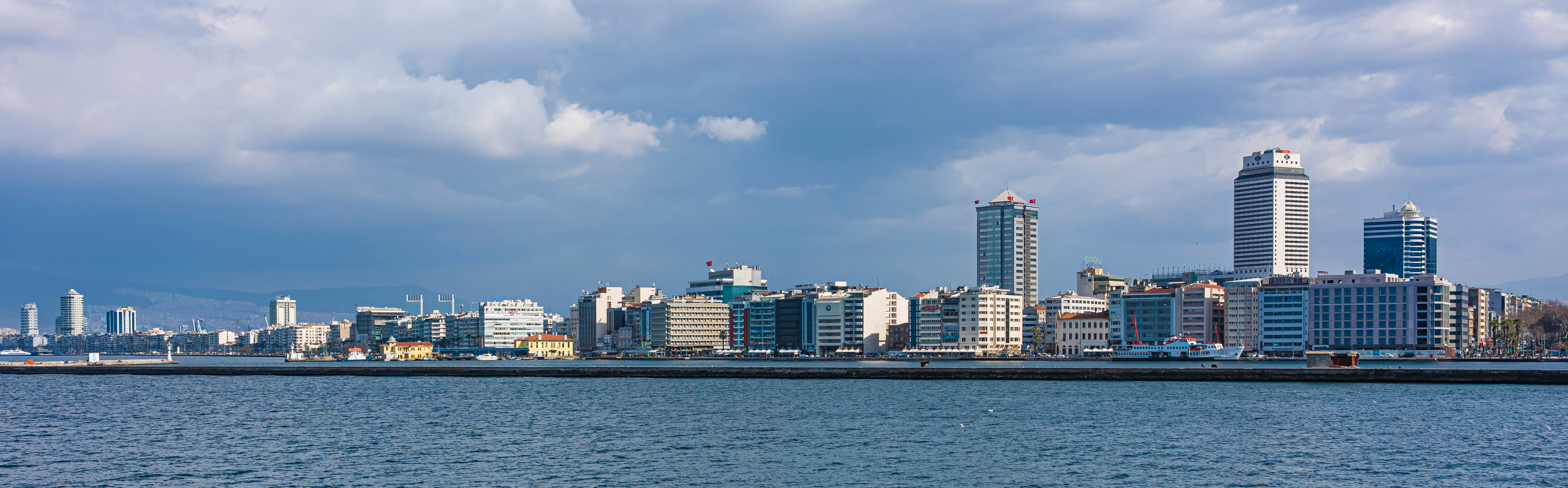
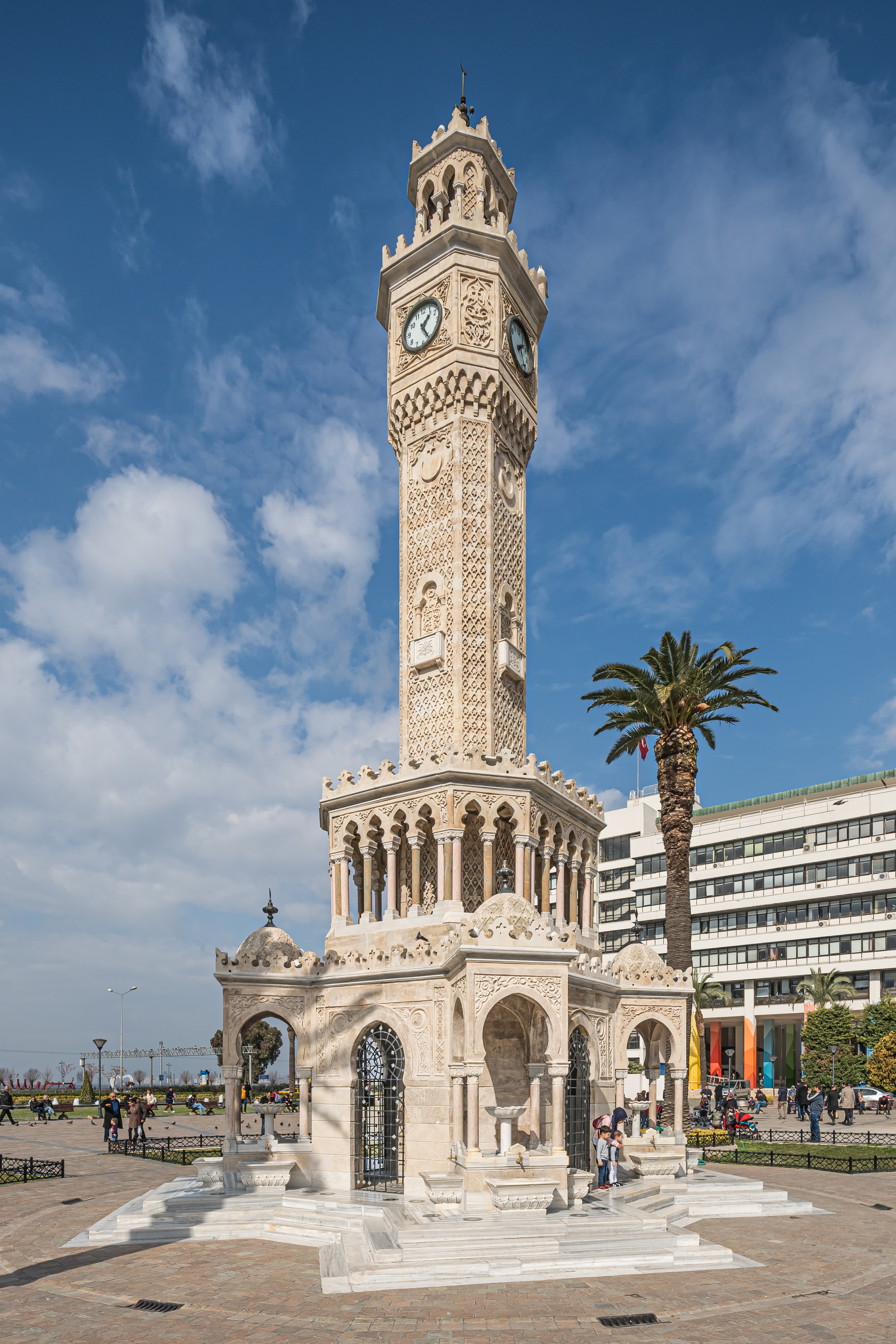
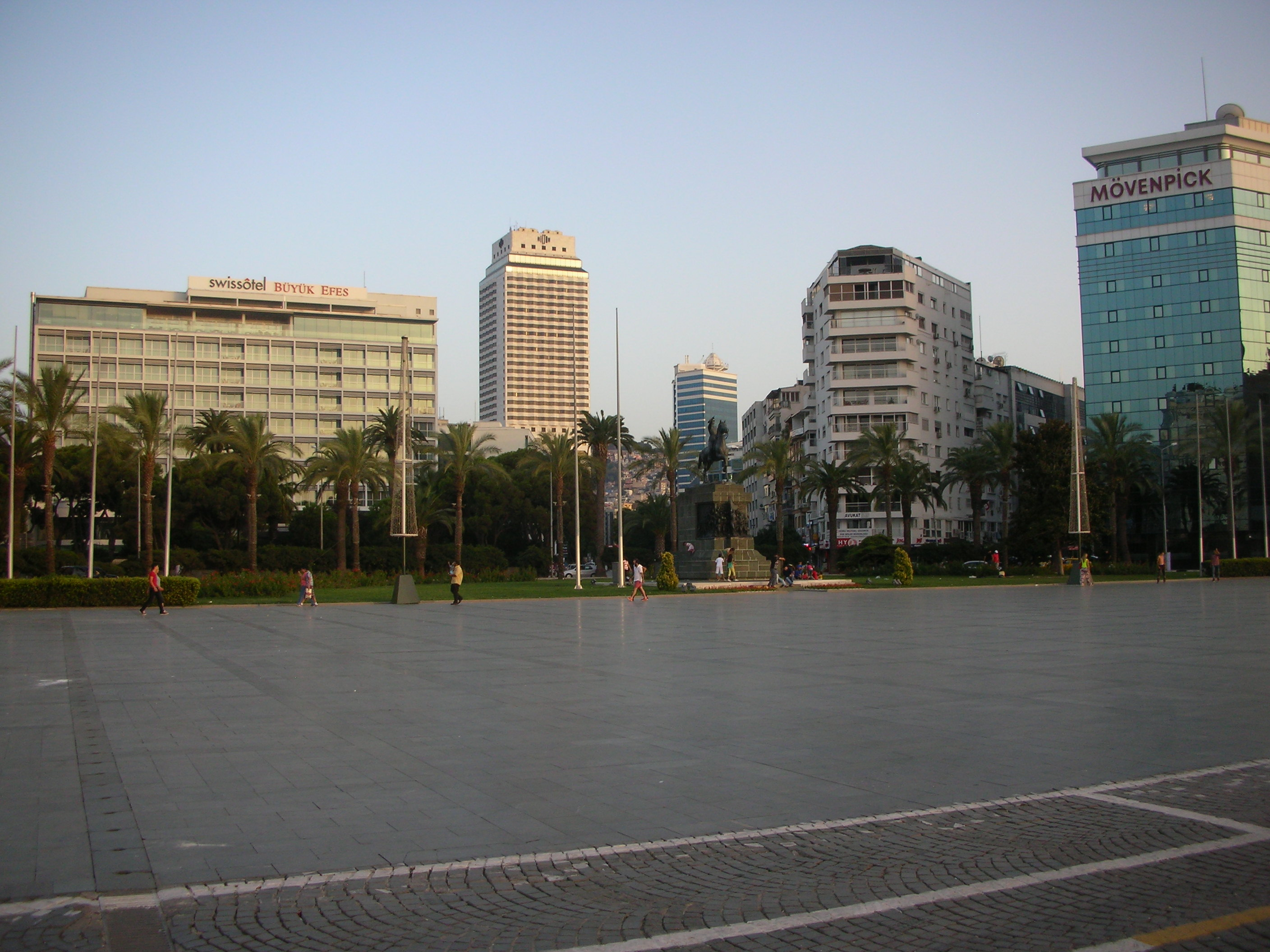
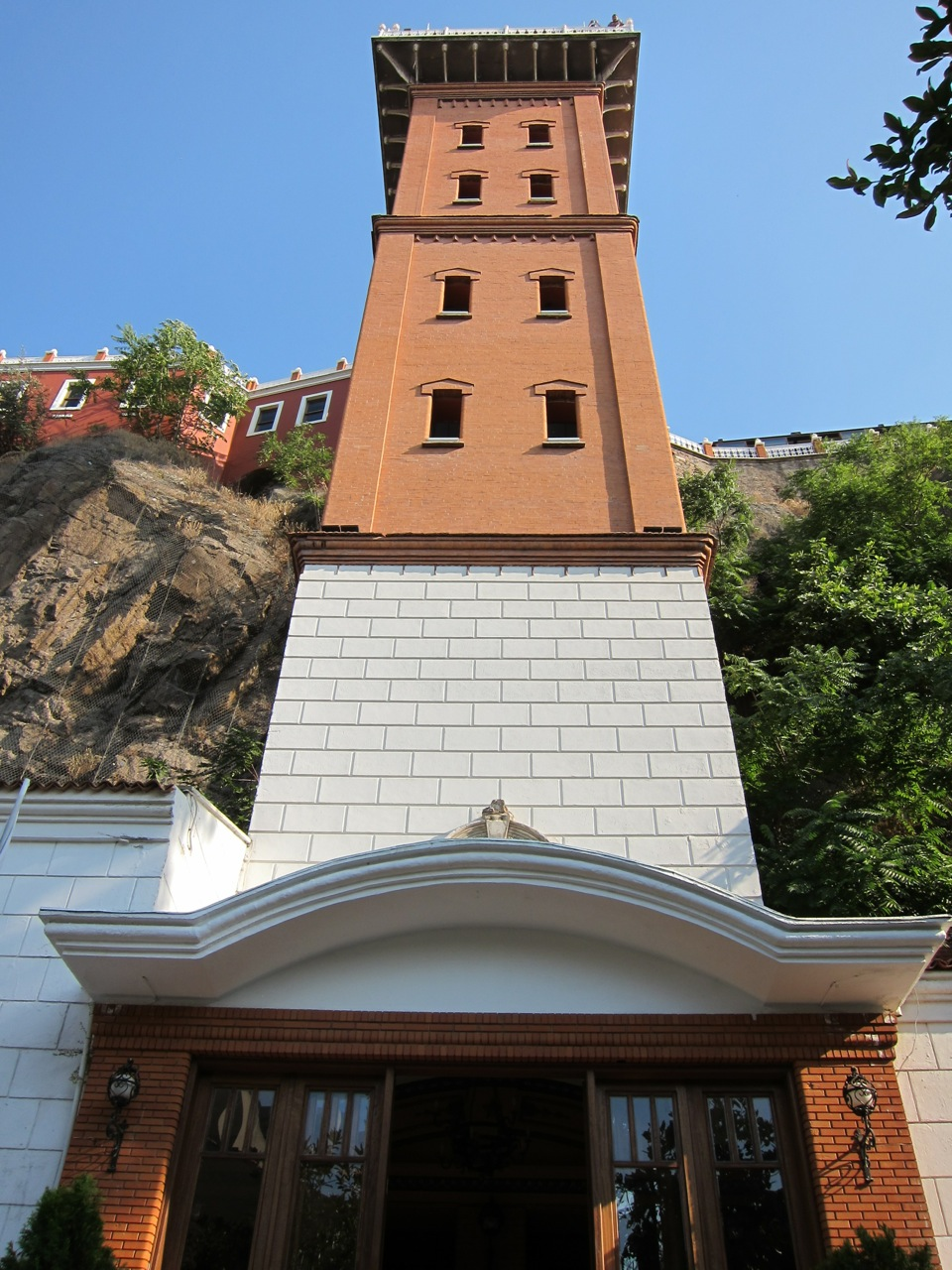
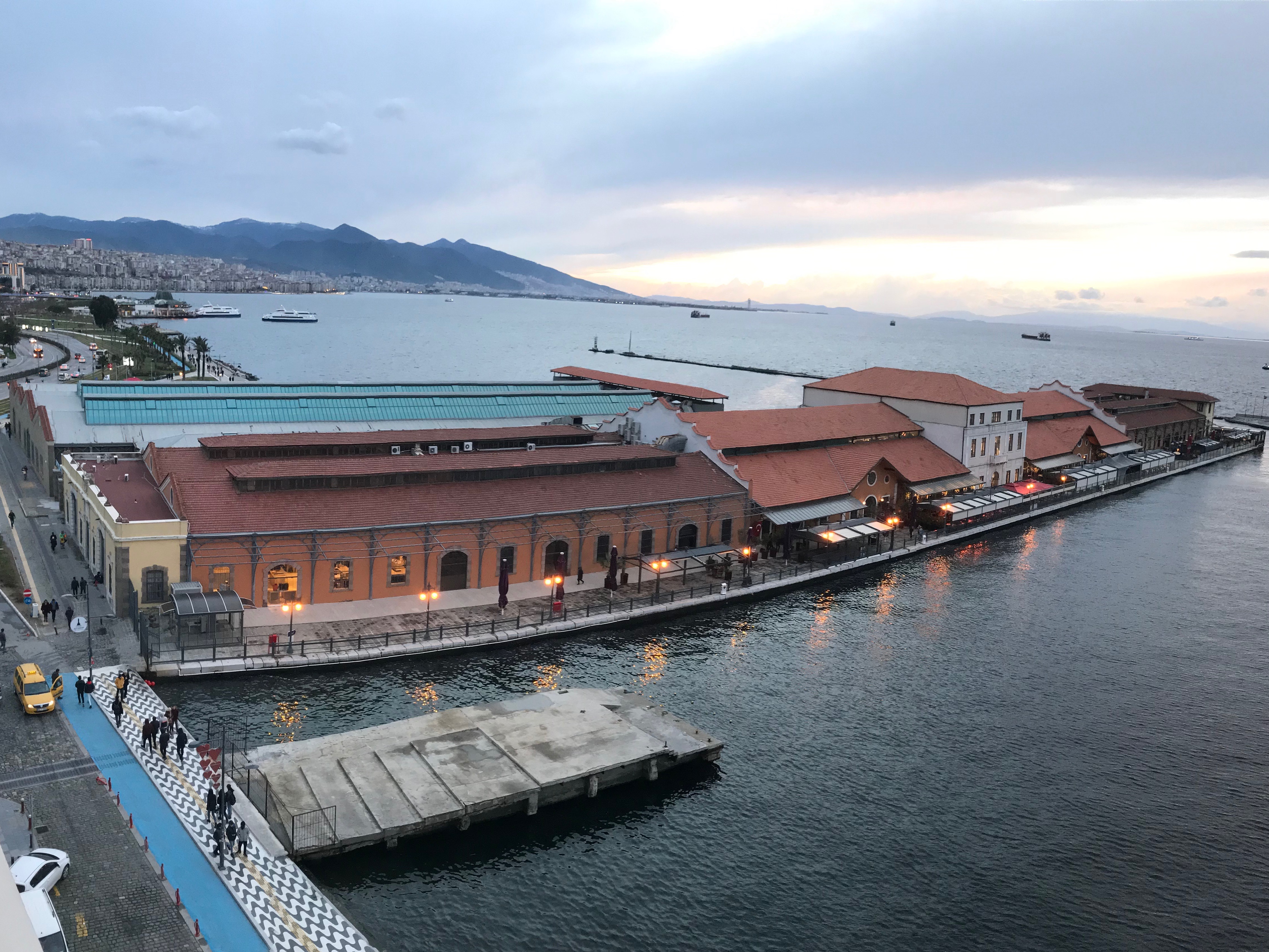
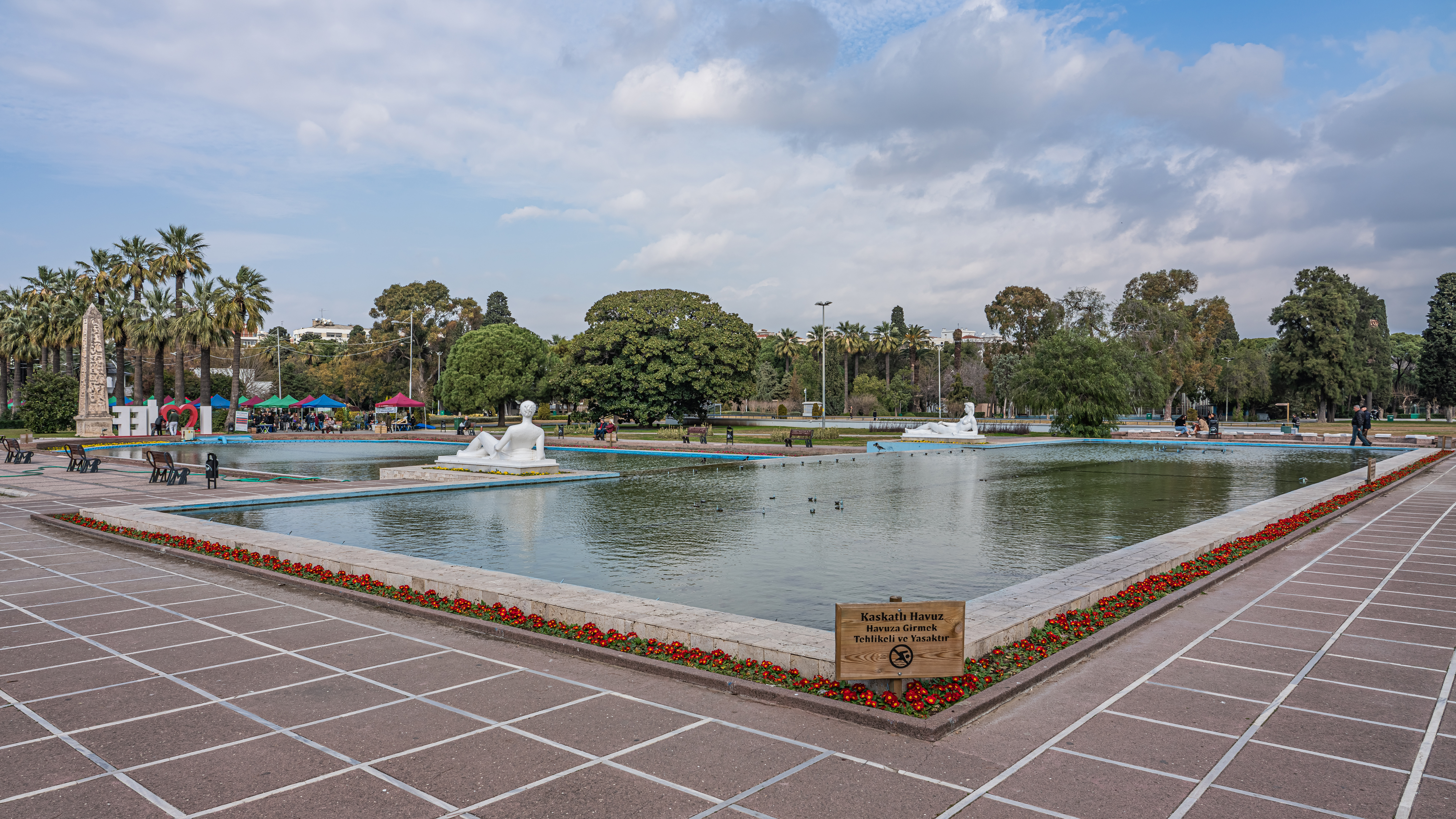
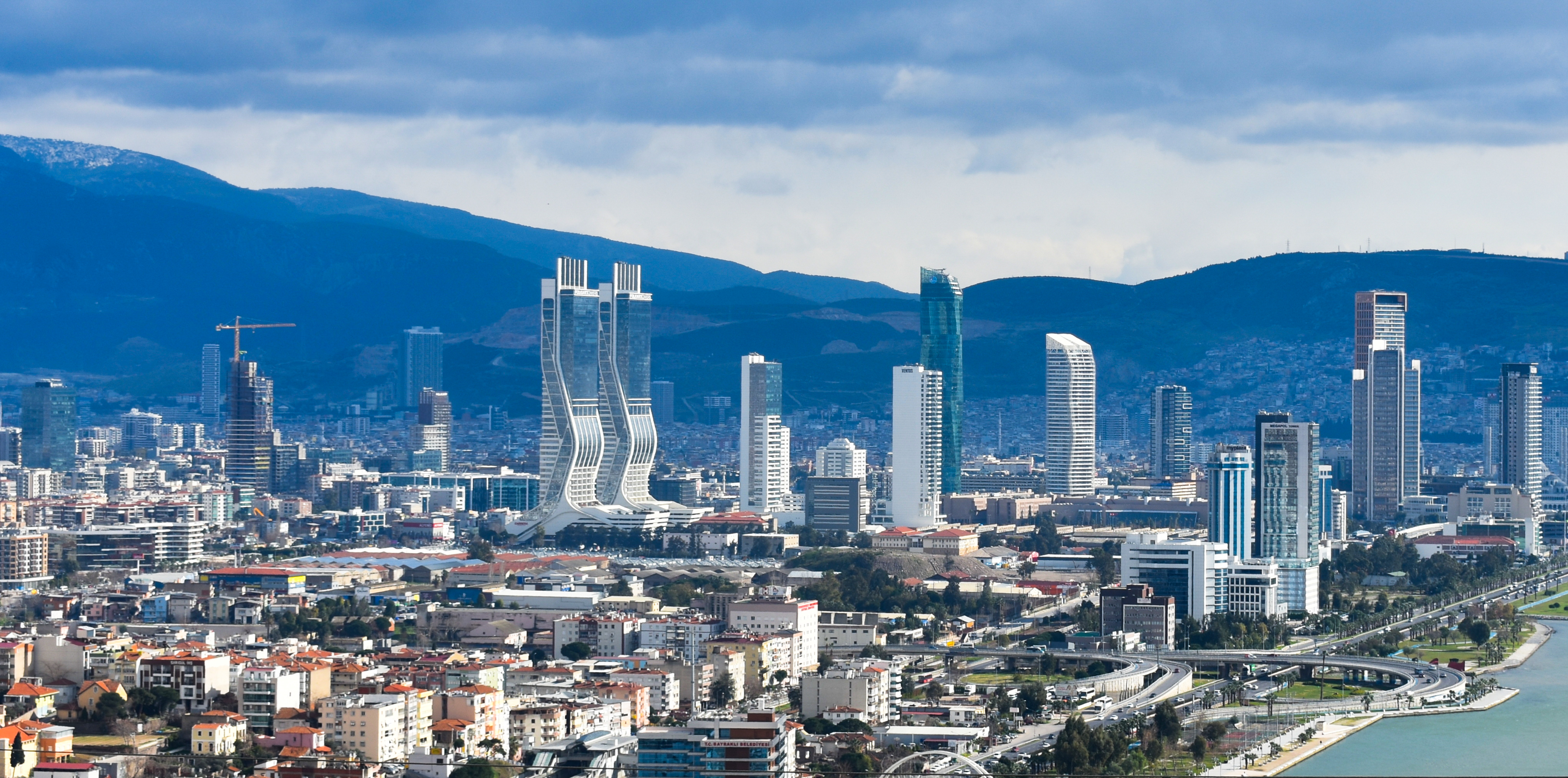
- Alsancak quarter in the Konak district Clock Tower Republic Square Asansör Konak Pier Kültürpark Skyline of Bayraklı business district

- Logo of Izmir Metropolitan Municipality

- Location within Turkey İzmir (Europe)
- Coordinates: 38°25′28″N 27°07′56″E
- Country: Turkey
- Region: Aegean
- Province: İzmir
- Earliest known settlement: c. 6500 BC (Yeşilova Mound in Bornova district)
- Founded: c. 11th century BC (as ancient Smyrna)

Government
  - Type: Mayor-council government
  - Mayor: Cemil Tugay (AK Party)
  - Municipal Council: 184 members: CHP (140); AKP (38); MHP (6)

Area
  - Urban: 919 km^{2} (355 sq mi)
  - Metro: 2,259 km^{2} (872 sq mi)
- Elevation: 2 m (6.6 ft)

Population
  - Rank: 3rd in Turkey
  - Urban: 3,025,000
  - Urban density: 4,761/km^{2} (12,330/sq mi)
  - Metro: 4,493,242
- Demonym(s): English: Izmirian; Turkish: İzmirli

GDP (nominal, 2024)
  - City: ₺2.563 trillion (US$101.172 billion)
  - Per capita: ₺556,376 (US$22,444)
- Time zone: UTC+3 (TRT)
- Postal code: 35xxx
- Area code: (+90) 232
- Licence plate: 35
- Website: www.izmir.bel.tr www.izmir.gov.tr

İzmir (Note: UK: /ˈɪzmɪər/ IZ-meer, US: /ɪzˈmɪər/ iz-MEER; Turkish pronunciation: [ˈizmiɾ]) also known as Smyrna is the third most populous city in Turkey, after Istanbul and Ankara, and the largest metropolitan area on the Aegean Sea. It is on the Aegean coast of Anatolia, and is the capital of İzmir Province. As of 2025 end of year estimate, İzmir Province has a total population of 4,504,184 while İzmir city is home to around 3.5 million inhabitants. (Note: There are not defined city boundaries in Turkey. TURKSTAT publishes population data only for provinces and districts which also includes rural neighborhoods. However, around 3.5 million people live in the districts up to 20 miles to the city center. This rough estimate is the sum of resident populations of Balçova, Bayraklı, Bornova, Buca, Çiğli, Gaziemir, Kemalpaşa, Güzelbahçe, Karabağlar, Menemen, Menderes, Karşıyaka, Konak, Narlıdere and figures for official Syrian refugee population of the province which is excluded in TURKSTAT population estimates.) It extends along the outlying waters of the Gulf of İzmir and inland to the north across the Gediz River Delta; to the east along an alluvial plain created by several small streams; and to slightly more rugged terrain in the south. İzmir's climate is Mediterranean.

İzmir has more than 3,000 years of recorded urban history, and up to 8,500 years of history as a human settlement since the Neolithic period. In classical antiquity, the city was known as Smyrna – a name which remained in use in English and various other languages until around 1930, when government efforts led the Greek name to be phased out internationally in favor of its Turkish counterpart İzmir.

Lying on an advantageous location at the head of a gulf running down in a deep indentation, midway along the western Anatolian coast, İzmir has been one of the principal mercantile cities of the Mediterranean Sea for much of its history. Until 1923 population exchange, İzmir had a very large Greek-speaking (Rum Milleti) population. Present-day İzmir is an important port, and also home to large Balkan Turkish communities. It hosts the annual İzmir International Fair.

== Names and etymology ==
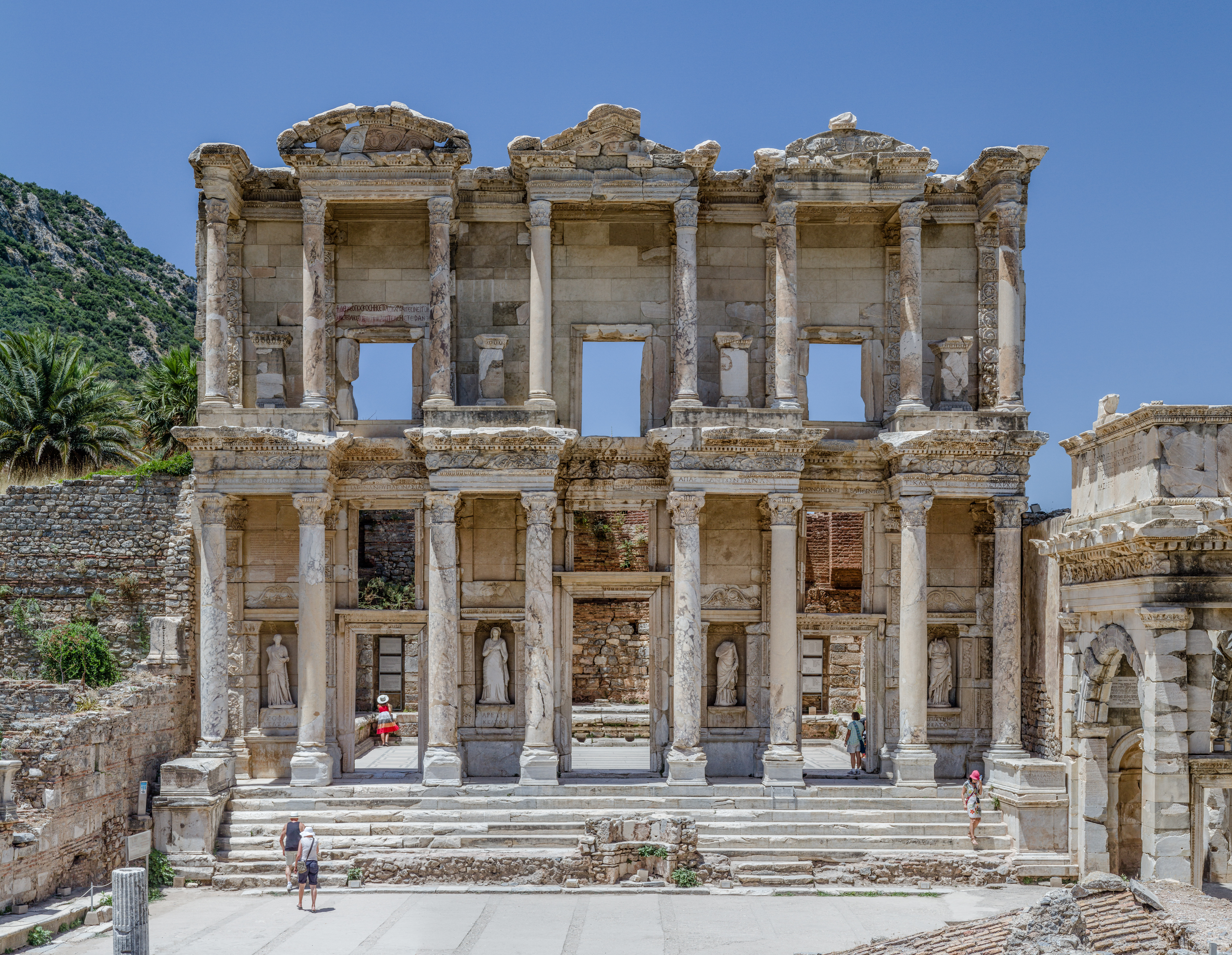
The ancient city of Ephesus is in the Province of İzmir.

In ancient Anatolia, the name of a locality called Ti-smurna is mentioned in some of the Level II tablets from the Assyrian colony in Kültepe (first half of the 2nd millennium BC), with the prefix ti- identifying a proper name, although it is not established with certainty that this name refers to modern-day İzmir.

The modern name İzmir is the Turkish rendering of the Greek name Smyrna (/ˈsmɜːrnə/ SMUR-nə; Greek: Σμύρνη, romanized: Smýrni/Smýrnē). In medieval times, Westerners used forms like Smire, Zmirra, Esmira, Ismira, which was rendered as İzmir into Turkish, originally written as ازمير with the Ottoman Turkish alphabet.

The region of İzmir was situated on the southern fringes of the Yortan culture in Anatolia's prehistory, knowledge of which is almost entirely drawn from its cemeteries. In the second half of the 2nd millennium BC, it was in the western end of the extension of the still largely obscure Arzawa Kingdom, an offshoot and usually a dependency of the Hittites, who themselves spread their direct rule as far as the coast during their Great Kingdom. That the realm of the 13th century BC local Luwian ruler, who is depicted in the Kemalpaşa Karabel rock carving at a distance of only 50 km (31 mi) from İzmir was called the Kingdom of Myra may also leave grounds for association with the city's name.

The latest known rendering in Greek of the city's name is the Aeolic Greek Μύρρα Mýrrha, corresponding to the later Ionian and Attic Σμύρνα (Smýrna) or Σμύρνη (Smýrnē), both presumably descendants of a Proto-Greek form *Smúrnā. Some would see in the city's name a reference to the name of an Amazon called Smyrna said to have seduced Theseus, leading him to name the city in her honor. Others link the name to the Myrrha commifera shrub, a plant producing the aromatic resin called myrrh that is indigenous to the Middle East and northeastern Africa, which was the city's chief export in antiquity. The Romans took over this name as Smyrna, which is still the name used in English when referring to the city in pre-Turkish times. In Ottoman Turkish the town's name was ازمير Izmīr.

In English, the city was called Smyrna into the 20th century. Izmir (sometimes İzmir) was adopted in English and most foreign languages after Turkey adopted the Latin alphabet in 1928 and urged other countries to use the city's Turkish name. However, the historic name Smyrna is still used today in some languages, such as Italian (Smirne), and Catalan, Portuguese, and Spanish (Esmirna).

== History ==
Historical affiliations
133 BC – 395	Roman Empire
395–1076	Byzantine Empire
1076–1081	Seljuk Empire
1081–1097	Chaka Bey
1097–1204	Byzantine Empire
1204–1209	Knights Hospitaller
1209–1261	Empire of Nicaea
1261–1330	Byzantine Empire
1330–1344	Beylik of Aydin
1344–1402	Knights Hospitaller and Beylik of Aydin
1402–1405	Timurid Empire
1405–1425	Beylik of Aydin
1425–1919	Ottoman Empire
1919–1922	Kingdom of Greece
1922–present	Republic of Turkey

=== Prehistory and ancient history ===
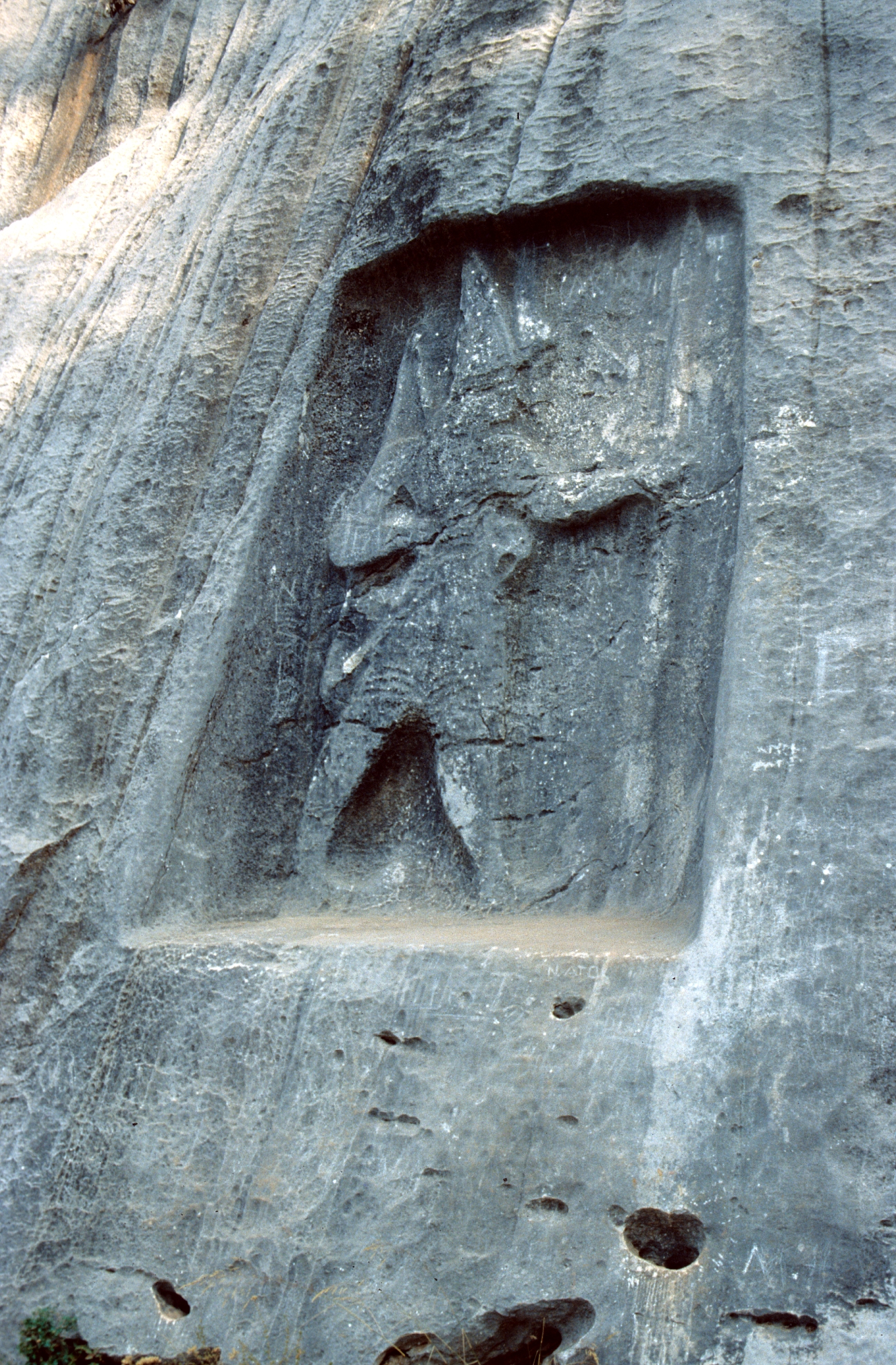
Karabel relief of the Luwian local leader "Tarkasnawa, King of Myra" is near Kemalpaşa, a few kilometres to the east of İzmir.

The city is one of the oldest settlements of the Mediterranean basin. The 2004 discovery of Yeşilova Höyük and the neighboring Yassıtepe, in the small delta of Meles River, now the Bornova plain, reset the starting date of the city's past further back than previously thought. Findings from two seasons of excavations carried out in the Yeşilova Höyük by a team of archaeologists from İzmir's Ege University indicate three levels, two of which are prehistoric. Level 2 bears traces of early to mid-Chalcolithic, and Level 3 of Neolithic settlements. These two levels would have been inhabited by the indigenous peoples of the area, very roughly, between the 7th millennium BC and the 4th millennium BC. As the seashore receded with time, the site was later used as a cemetery. Several graves containing artifacts dating roughly from 3000 BC, and contemporary with the first city of Troy, were found.

=== Bronze Age ===
The first settlement to have commanded the Gulf of İzmir as a whole was established on top of Mount Yamanlar, to the northeast of the inner gulf. In connection with the silt brought by the streams which join the sea along the coastline, the settlement to form later the core of "Old Smyrna" was founded on the slopes of the same mountain, on a hill (then a small peninsula connected to the mainland by a small isthmus) in the present-day neighborhood of Tepekule in Bayraklı. The Bayraklı settlement is thought to have stretched back in time as far as the 3rd millennium BC.

Archaeological findings of the late Bronze Age show a certain degree of Mycenaean influence in the settlement and the surrounding region, though further excavations of Bronze Age layers are needed to propose Old Smyrna of that time as a Mycenaean settlement. In the 13th century BC, however, invasions from the Balkans (the so-called Sea Peoples) destroyed Troy VII, and Central and Western Anatolia as a whole fell into what is generally called the period of "Anatolian" and "Greek" Dark Ages of the Bronze Age collapse.

=== Iron Age ===
At the dawn of İzmir's recorded history, Pausanias describes "evident tokens" such as "a port called after the name of Tantalus and a sepulcher of him by no means obscure", corresponding to the city's area and which have been tentatively located to date. The term "Old Smyrna" is used to describe the Archaic Period city located at Tepekule, Bayraklı, to make a distinction with the city of Smyrna rebuilt later on the slopes of Mount Pagos (present-day Kadifekale). The Greek settlement in Old Smyrna is attested by the presence of pottery dating from about 1000 BC onwards. The most ancient preserved ruins date back to 725–700 BC. According to Herodotus the city was founded by Aeolians and later seized by Ionians. The oldest house discovered in Bayraklı has been dated to 925 and 900 BC. The walls of this well-preserved house (2.45 by 4 metres or 8.0 by 13.1 feet), consisting of one small room typical of the Iron Age, were made of sun-dried bricks and the roof of the house was made of reeds. A house found in Old Smyrna with two floors and five rooms with a courtyard, built in the second half of the 7th century BC, is the oldest known house having so many rooms under its roof. Around that time, people started to build thick, protective ramparts made of sun-dried bricks around the city. Smyrna was built on the Hippodamian system, in which streets run north–south and east–west and intersect at right angles, in a pattern familiar in the Near East but the earliest example in a western city. The houses all faced south. The most ancient paved streets in the Ionian civilization have also been discovered in ancient Smyrna.

Homer, referred to as Melesigenes meaning "Child of the Meles Brook", is said to have been born in Smyrna in the 7th or 8th century BC. Combined with written evidence, it is generally admitted that Smyrna and Chios put forth the strongest arguments in claiming Homer and the main belief is that he was born in Ionia. The River Meles, still bearing the same name, is located within the city limits, although associations with the Homeric river is subject to controversy.

From the 7th century onwards, Smyrna achieved the identity of a city-state. About a thousand people lived inside the city walls, with others living in nearby villages, where fields, olive trees, vineyards, and the workshops of potters and stonecutters were located. People generally made their living from agriculture and fishing. The most important sanctuary of Old Smyrna was the Temple of Athena, which dates back to 640–580 BC and is partially restored today. Smyrna, by this point, was no longer a small town, but an urban center taking part in the Mediterranean trade. The city eventually became one of the twelve Ionian cities and was well on its way to becoming a foremost cultural and commercial center in the Mediterranean basin of that period, reaching its peak between 650 and 545 BC.

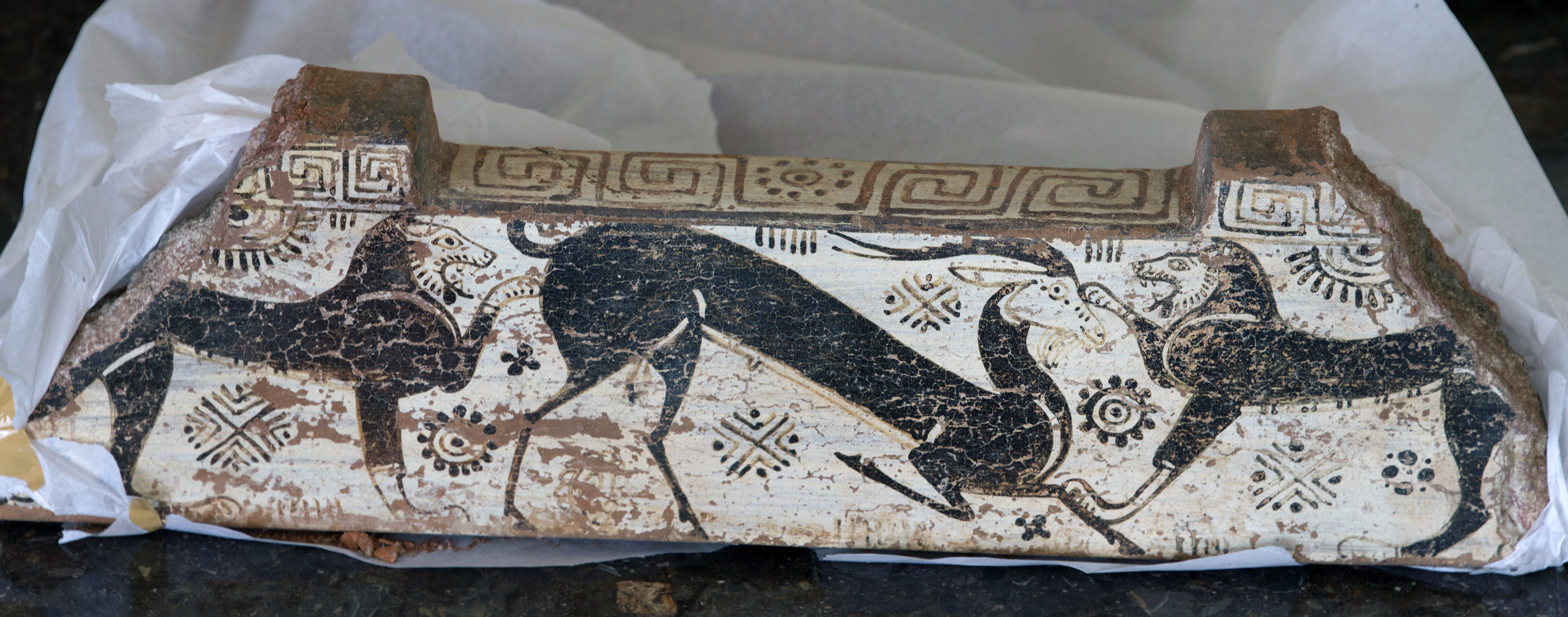
İzmir Archaeology Museum has exhibits from ancient sites like Bayraklı (ancient Smyrna), Ephesus, Pergamon, Miletus, Aphrodisias, Clazomenae, Teos, and Iasos.

The city's port position near their capital drew the Lydians to Smyrna. The army of Lydia's Mermnad dynasty conquered the city sometime around 610–600 BC and is reported to have burned and destroyed parts of the city, although recent analyses on the remains in Bayraklı demonstrate that the temple had been in continuous use or was very quickly repaired under the Lydian rule.

=== Classical Age ===
Soon afterwards, an invasion from outside Anatolia by the Persian Empire effectively ended Old Smyrna's history as an urban center of note. The Persian emperor Cyrus the Great attacked the coastal cities of the Aegean after conquering the capital of Lydia. As a result, Old Smyrna was destroyed in 545 BC.

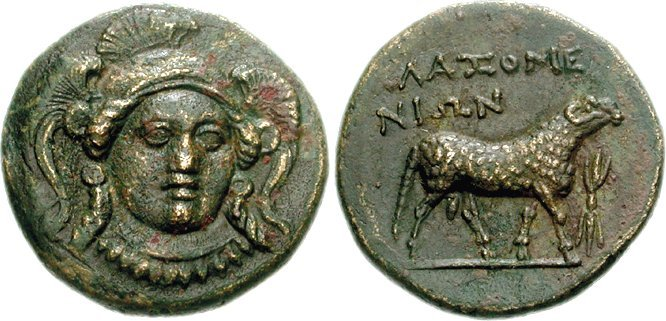
Coinage of Klazomenai, circa 386–301 BC in Urla, slightly outside İzmir urban zone, is associated with some of the oldest known records of trade in olive oil.

Alexander the Great re-founded the city at a new location beyond the Meles River around 340 BC. Alexander had defeated the Persians in several battles and finally the Emperor Darius III himself at Issus in 333 BC. Old Smyrna on a small hill by the sea was large enough only for a few thousand people. Therefore, the slopes of Mount Pagos (Kadifekale) were chosen for the foundation of the new city, for which Alexander is credited, and this act laid the ground for a resurgence in the city's population.

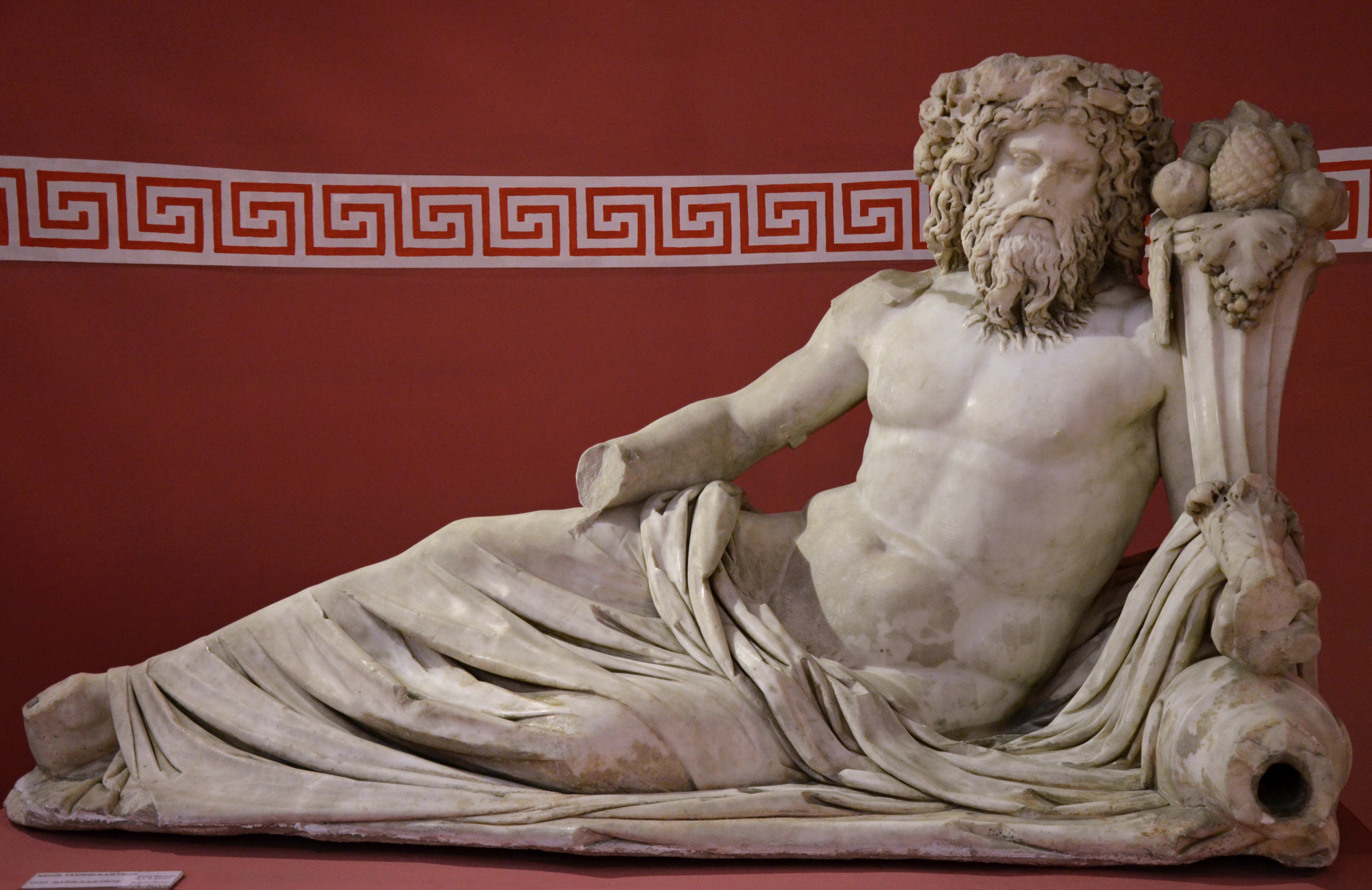
Statue of the river god Kaystros with a cornucopia, at the Museum of History and Art, Kültürpark, Izmir

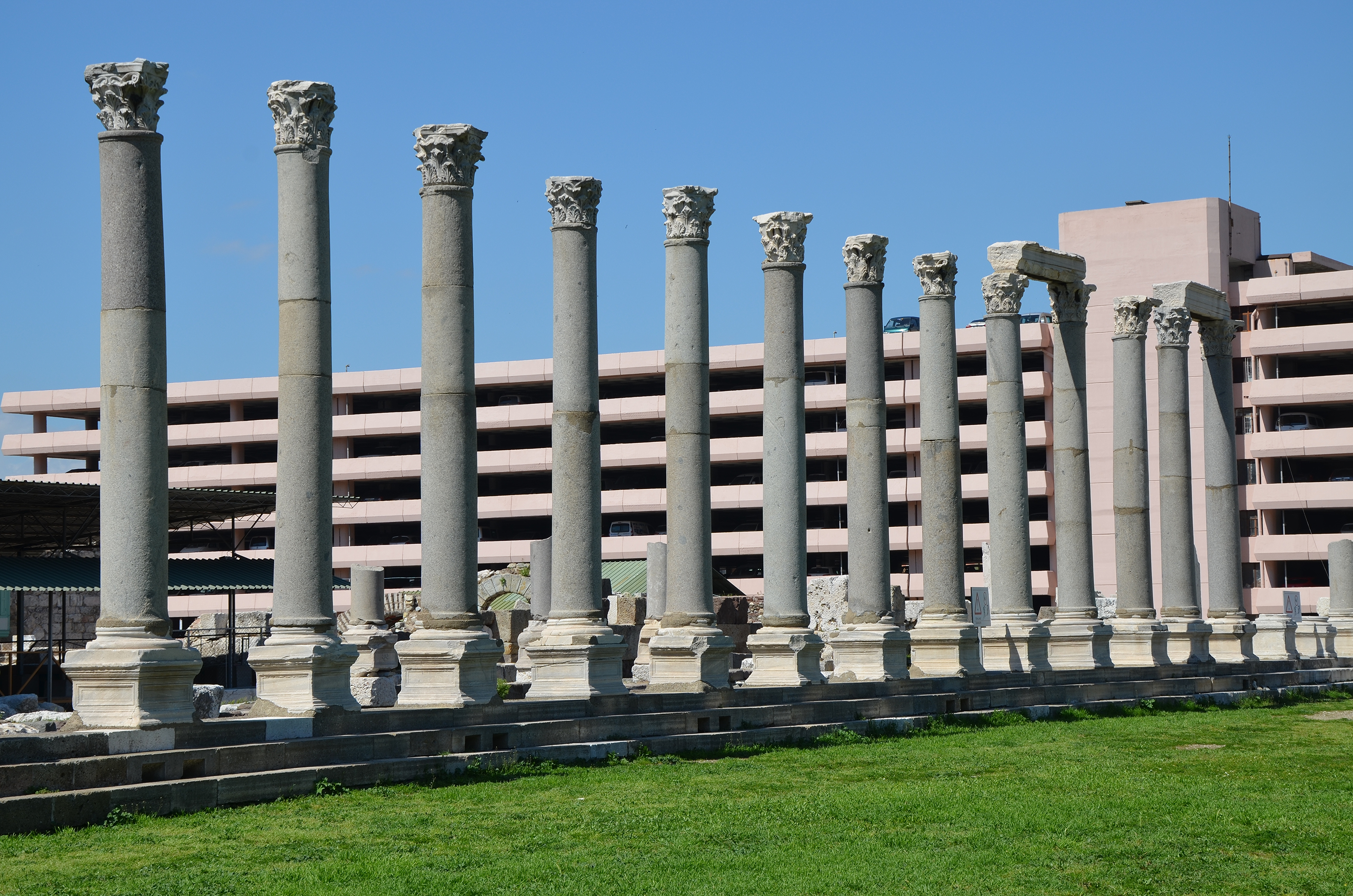
Agora of Smyrna, built during the Hellenistic era at the base of Pagos Hill and totally rebuilt under Marcus Aurelius after the destructive 178 AD earthquake in Smyrna

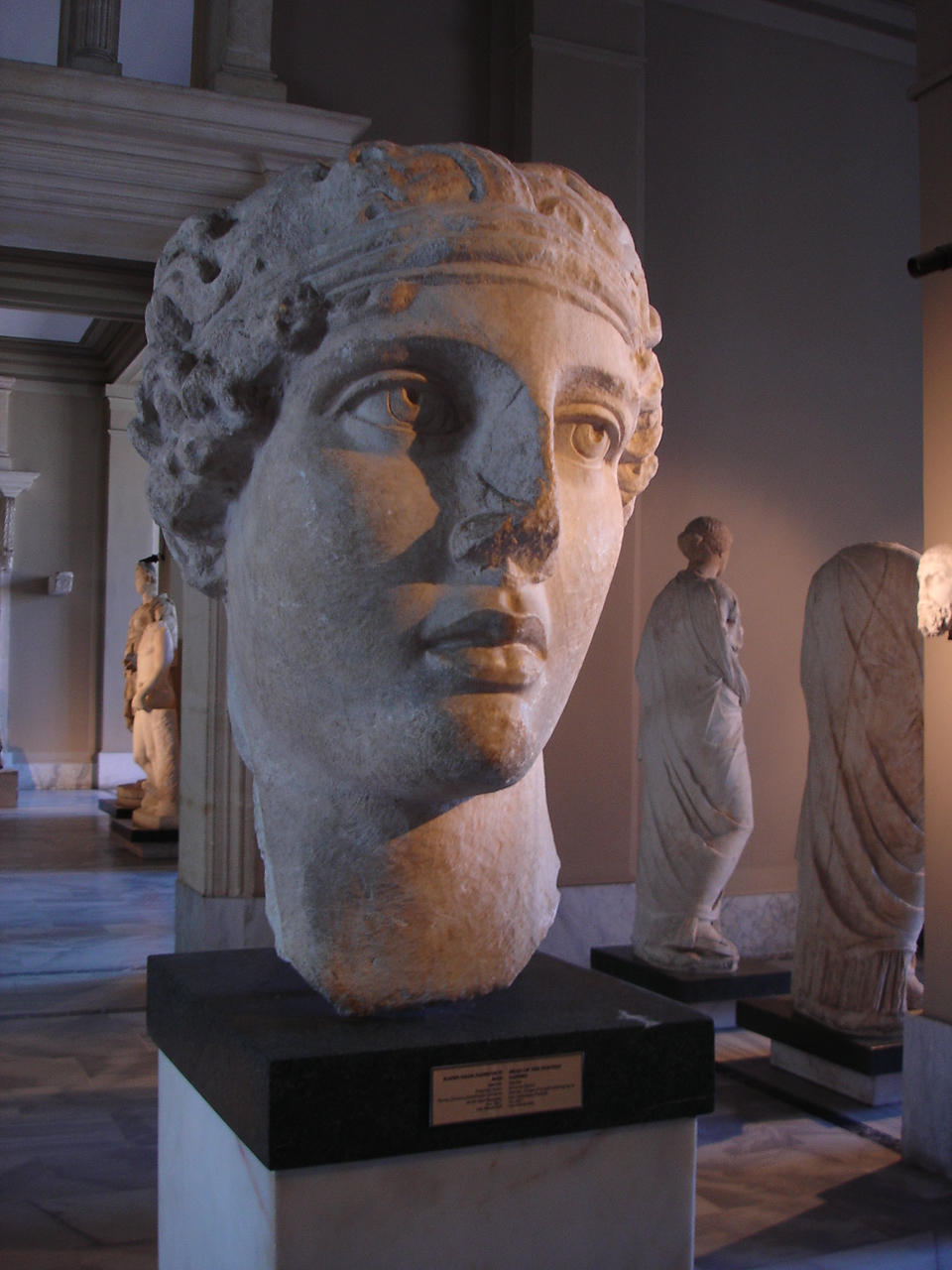
Head of the poet Sappho found in ancient Smyrna. Roman marble copy of an original statue from the Hellenistic period, at the Istanbul Archaeology Museums.

In 133 BC, Eumenes III, the last king of the Attalid Kingdom of Pergamon, was about to die without an heir. In his will, he bequeathed his kingdom to the Roman Republic, and this included Smyrna. The city thus came under Roman rule as a civil diocese within the Province of Asia and enjoyed a new period of prosperity. Towards the close of the 1st century, Smyrna was one of the seven churches of Asia mentioned in Revelation 2:9. John the Apostle urged his followers to remain Christians in Revelation 2:10: "Be faithful to the point of death, and I will give you the crown of life".

Given the importance of the city, Roman emperors who came to Anatolia also visited Smyrna. In early 124, Emperor Hadrian visited Smyrna on his journeys across the Empire and possibly Caracalla came in 214–215. Smyrna was a fine city with stone-paved streets.

In 178, the city was devastated by an earthquake. Emperor Marcus Aurelius contributed greatly to its rebuilding. During this period, the agora was restored. Many of the works of architecture from the city's pre-Turkish period date from this period.

After the Roman Empire was divided into two distinct entities, Smyrna became a territory of the Eastern Roman Empire. It remained a notable religious center in the early Byzantine period but never returned to Roman levels of prosperity.

=== Medieval period ===
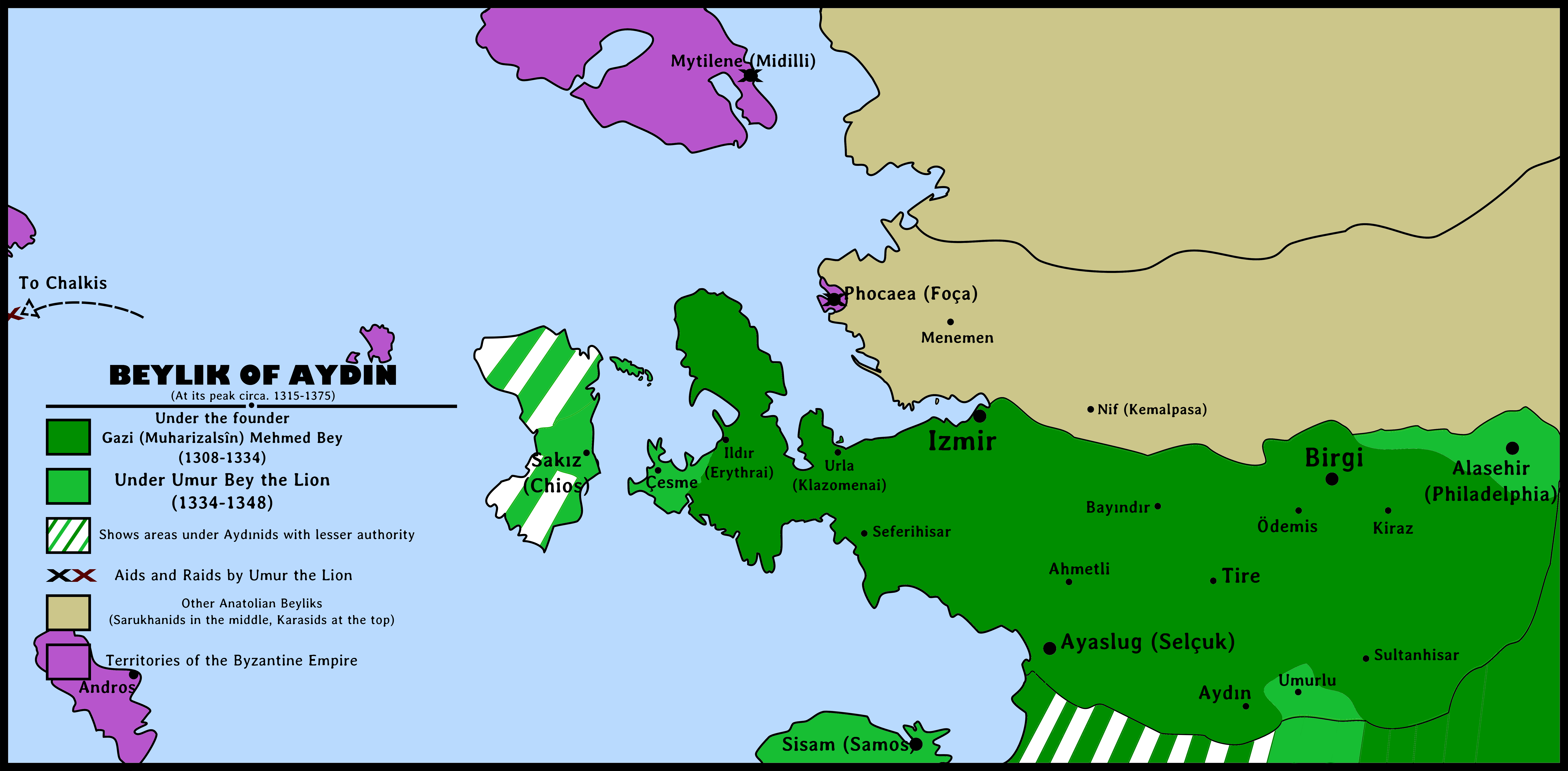
Beylik of Aydın in the 14th century

The Turkic peoples first captured Smyrna under the Seljuk commander Çaka Bey, called Tzachas by the Byzantines, in 1076, along with Klazomenai, Foça and a number of the Aegean Islands. Çaka Bey used İzmir as a base for his naval operations. In 1097, the Byzantine commander John Doukas recaptured the city and the neighboring region. The port city was then captured by the Knights of St John when Constantinople was conquered by the Crusaders during the Fourth Crusade in 1204, but the Nicaean Empire would reclaim possession of the city soon afterward, albeit by giving vast concessions to their Genoese allies, who kept one of the city's castles and the lordship of the towns of Old Phocaea and New Phocaea (now part of the İzmir Province) from 1275 to 1340.

Smyrna was captured again in the 14th century by Umur Bey, the son of the founder of the Beylik of Aydın who first took the upper fort of Mount Pagos (after that called Kadifekale), and then the lower port castle of Neon Kastron (called "St. Peter" by the Genoese and "Ok Kalesi" by the Turks). As Çaka Bey had done two centuries before, Umur Bey used the city as a base for naval raids. In 1344, a coalition of forces coordinated by Pope Clement VI took back the lower castle in a surprise attack in the Smyrniote crusades. Sixty years of uneasy cohabitation between the two powers, the Beyliks holding the upper castle and the Knights the lower, followed by Umur Bey's death in 1348.

=== Ottoman period ===
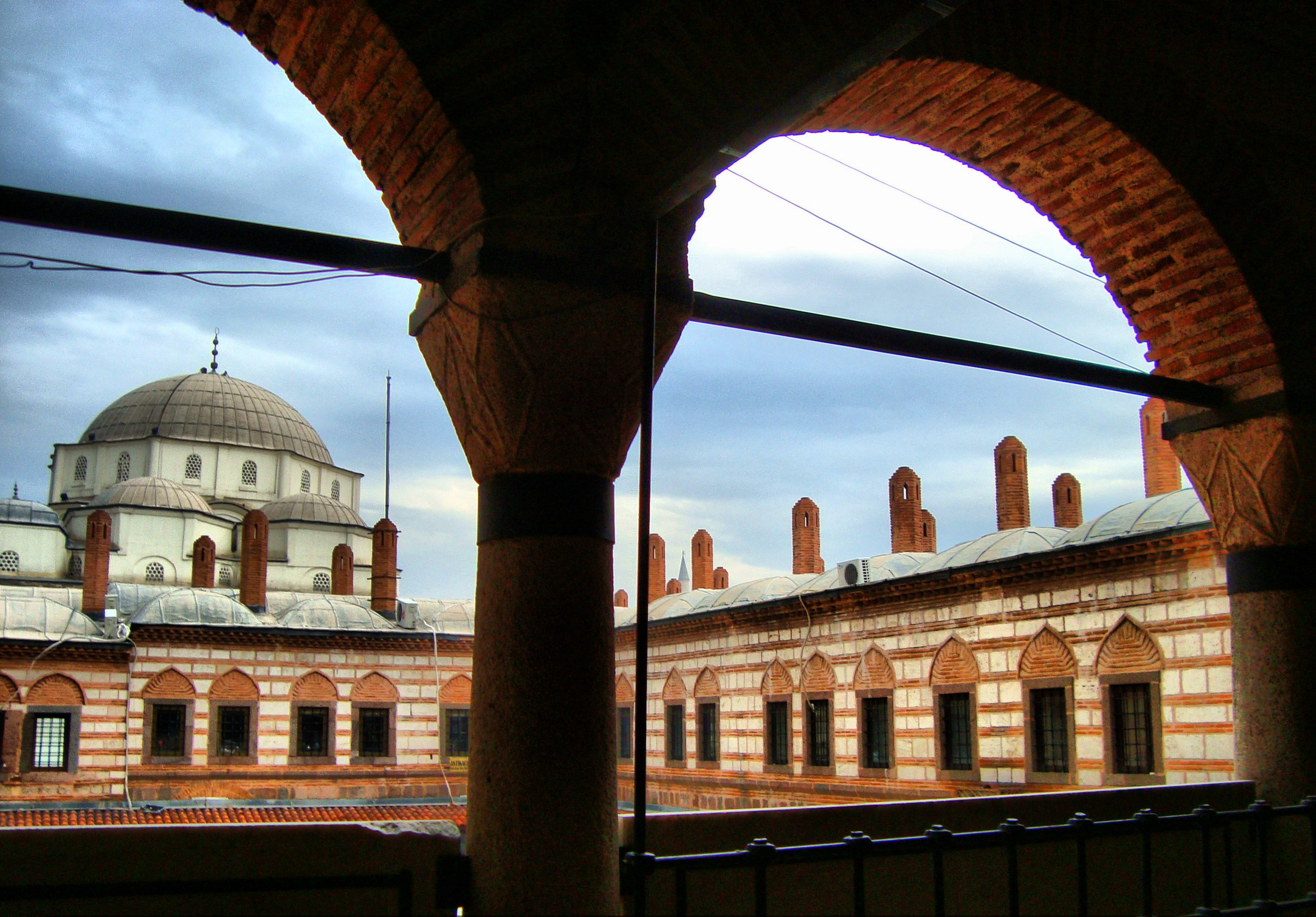
Hisar Mosque (1592–1598) in the Kemeraltı neighbourhood of İzmir

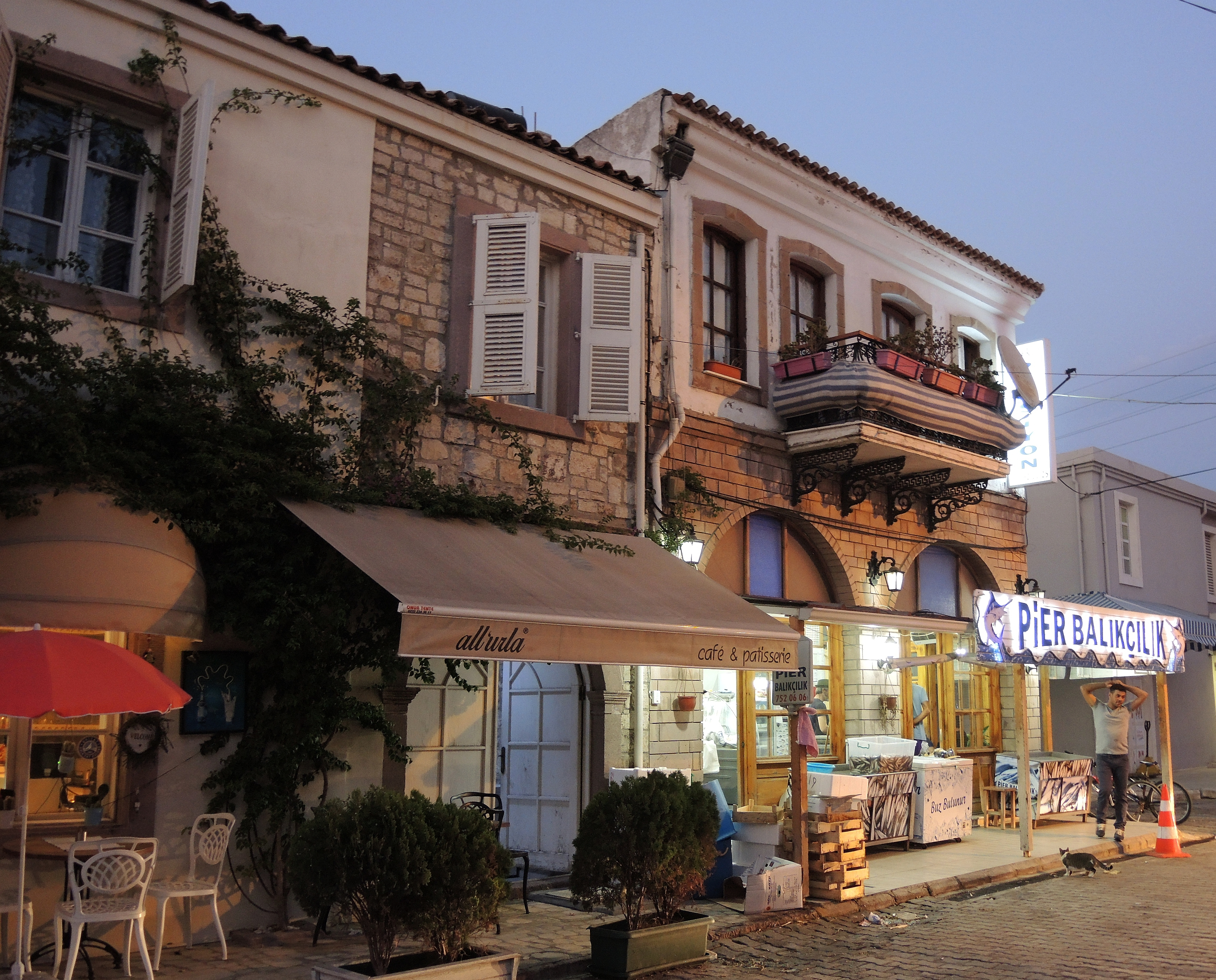
Old Ottoman houses in Urla, İzmir

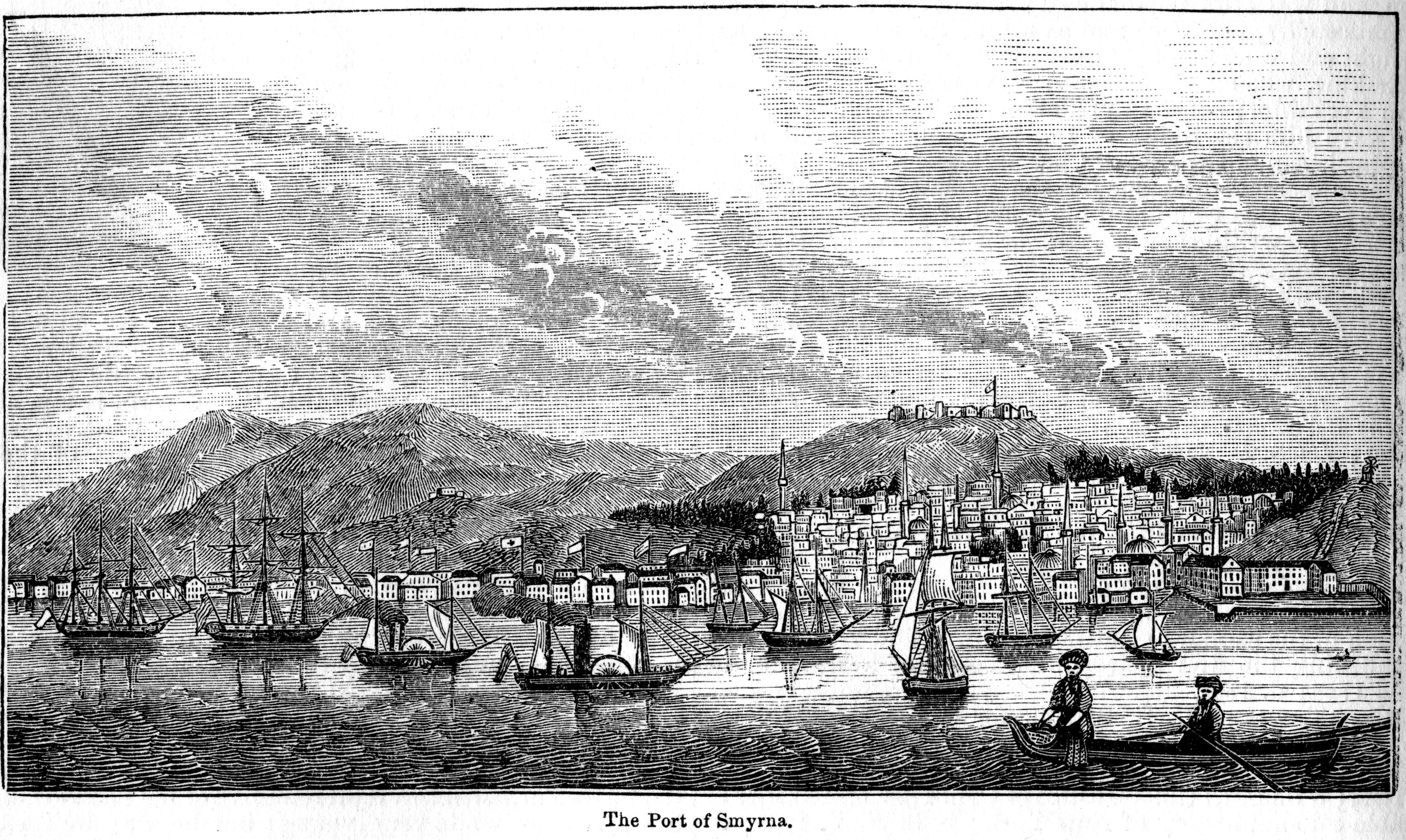
The port of İzmir, from an 1883 encyclopedia

The upper city of İzmir was captured from its Aydinid rulers by the Ottomans for the first time in 1389 during the reign of Bayezid I, who led his armies toward the five Western Anatolian Beyliks in the winter of the same year he had come to the throne. In 1402, however, Timur (Tamerlane) won the Battle of Ankara against the Ottomans, putting a serious check on the Ottoman state for the two following decades and handing back the territories of most of the Beyliks to their former ruling dynasties. Timur attacked and destroyed Smyrna and was responsible for the massacre of most of the Christian population, which constituted the vast majority in Smyrna. In 1415, Mehmet I took back İzmir for the Ottomans for the second time. With the death of the last bey of Aydın, İzmiroğlu Cüneyd Bey, in 1426 the city passed fully under Ottoman control. İzmir's first Ottoman governor was Alexander, a converted son of the Bulgarian Shishman dynasty. During the campaigns against Cüneyd, the Ottomans were assisted by the forces of the Knights Hospitaller who pressed the Sultan to return the port castle to them. However, the sultan refused to make this concession, despite the resulting tensions between the two camps, and he gave the Hospitallers permission to build a castle (the present-day Bodrum Castle) in Petronium (Bodrum) instead.

In a landward-looking arrangement somewhat against its nature, the city and its present-day dependencies became an Ottoman sanjak (sub-province) either inside the larger vilayet (province) of Aydın part of the eyalet of Anatolia, with its capital in Kütahya or in "Cezayir" (i.e. "Islands" referring to "the Aegean Islands"). In the 15th century, two notable events for the city were a surprise Venetian raid in 1475 and the arrival of Sephardic Jews from Spain after 1492; they later made İzmir one of their principal urban centers in Ottoman lands. İzmir may have been a rather sparsely populated place in the 15th and 16th centuries, as indicated by the first extant Ottoman records describing the town dating from 1528. In 1530, 304 adult males, both tax-paying and tax-exempt were on record, 42 of them Christians. There were five urban wards, one of these situated in the immediate vicinity of the port, rather active despite the town's small size and where the non-Muslim population was concentrated. By 1576, İzmir had grown to house 492 taxpayers in eight urban wards and had a number of dependent villages. This corresponded to a total population estimated between 3500 and 5000.

==== International port city ====
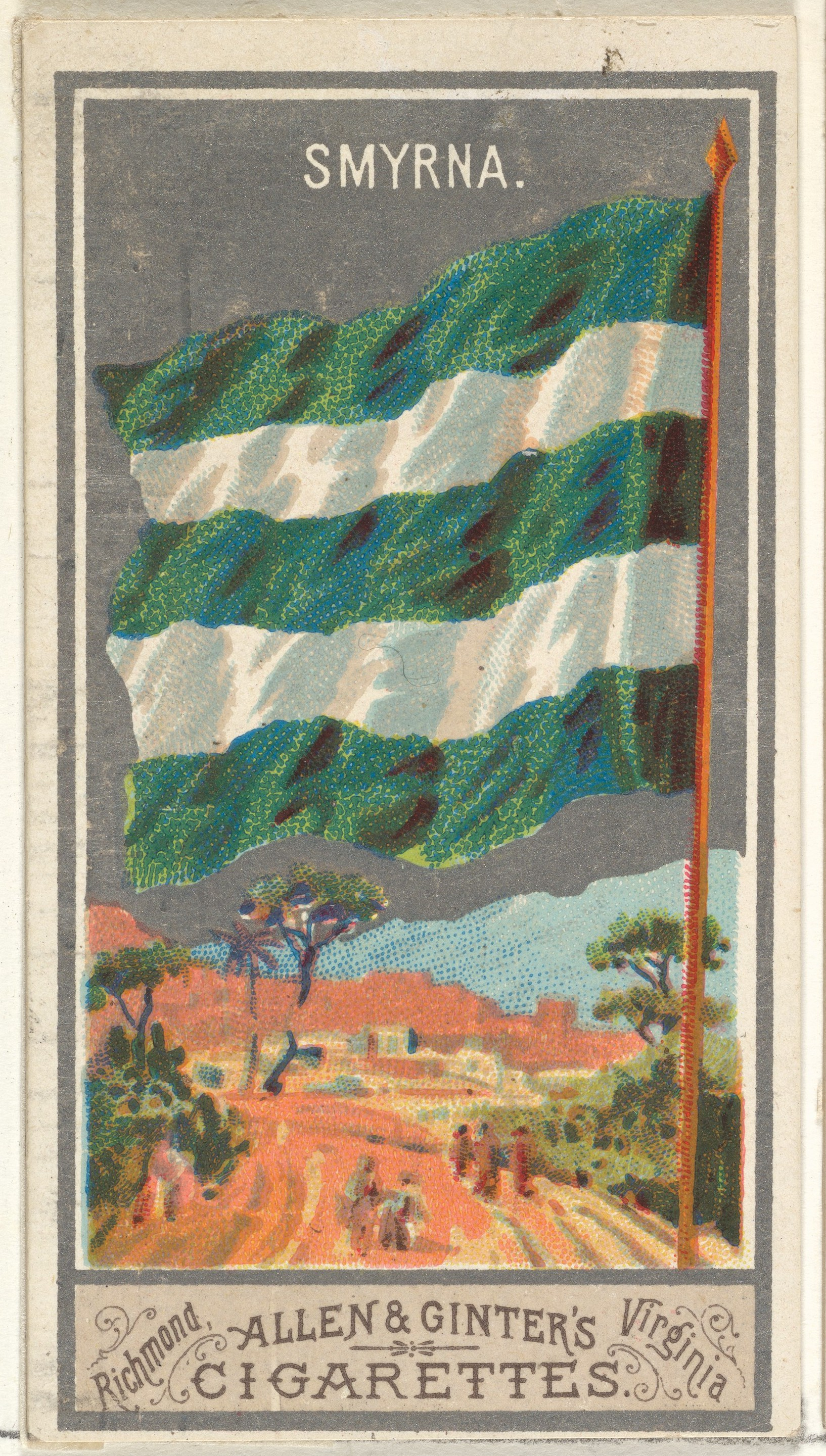
Maritime flag of İzmir during the late Ottoman period

İzmir's remarkable growth began in the late 16th century when cotton and other products of the region brought French, English, Dutch and Venetian traders here. The emergence of İzmir as a major international port by the 17th century was largely a result of the attraction it exercised over foreigners and the city's European orientation. With the privileged trading conditions accorded to foreigners in 1620 (these were the infamous capitulations that were later to cause a serious threat and setback for the Ottoman state in its decline), İzmir began to be one of the foremost trade centers of the Empire. Foreign consulates moved from Chios to the city by the early 17th century (1619 for the French Consulate, 1621 for the British), serving as trade centers for their nations. Each consulate had its own quay, where the ships under their flag would anchor. The long campaign for the conquest of Crete (22 years between 1648 and 1669) also considerably enhanced İzmir's position within the Ottoman realm since the city served as a port of dispatch and supply for the troops. İzmir was also one of the few Ottoman port cities which had a maritime flag.

Despite facing a plague in 1676, an earthquake in 1688, and a great fire in 1743, the city continued to grow. By the end of the 17th century, the population was estimated at ninety thousand, the Turks forming the majority (about 60,000); there were also 15,000 Greeks, 8,000 Armenians and 6,000 to 7,000 Jews, as well as a considerable section made up of French, English, Dutch and Italian merchants. In the meantime, the Ottomans had allowed İzmir's inner bay dominated by the port castle to silt up progressively (the location of the present-day Kemeraltı bazaar zone) and the port castle ceased to be of use.

In 1770, the Ottoman fleet was destroyed by Russian forces at the Battle of Çeşme, located near the city. This triggered fanatical Muslim groups to proceed to the massacre of c. 1,500 local Greeks. Later, in 1797 a riot resulting from the indiscipline of janissaries corps led to massive destruction of the Frankish merchant community and the killing of 1,500 members of the city's Greek community. In 1818, traveller William Jowett described the distribution of Smyrna's population: Turks 60,000, Greeks 40,000, Jews 10,000, Latins 3,000, Armenians 7,000.

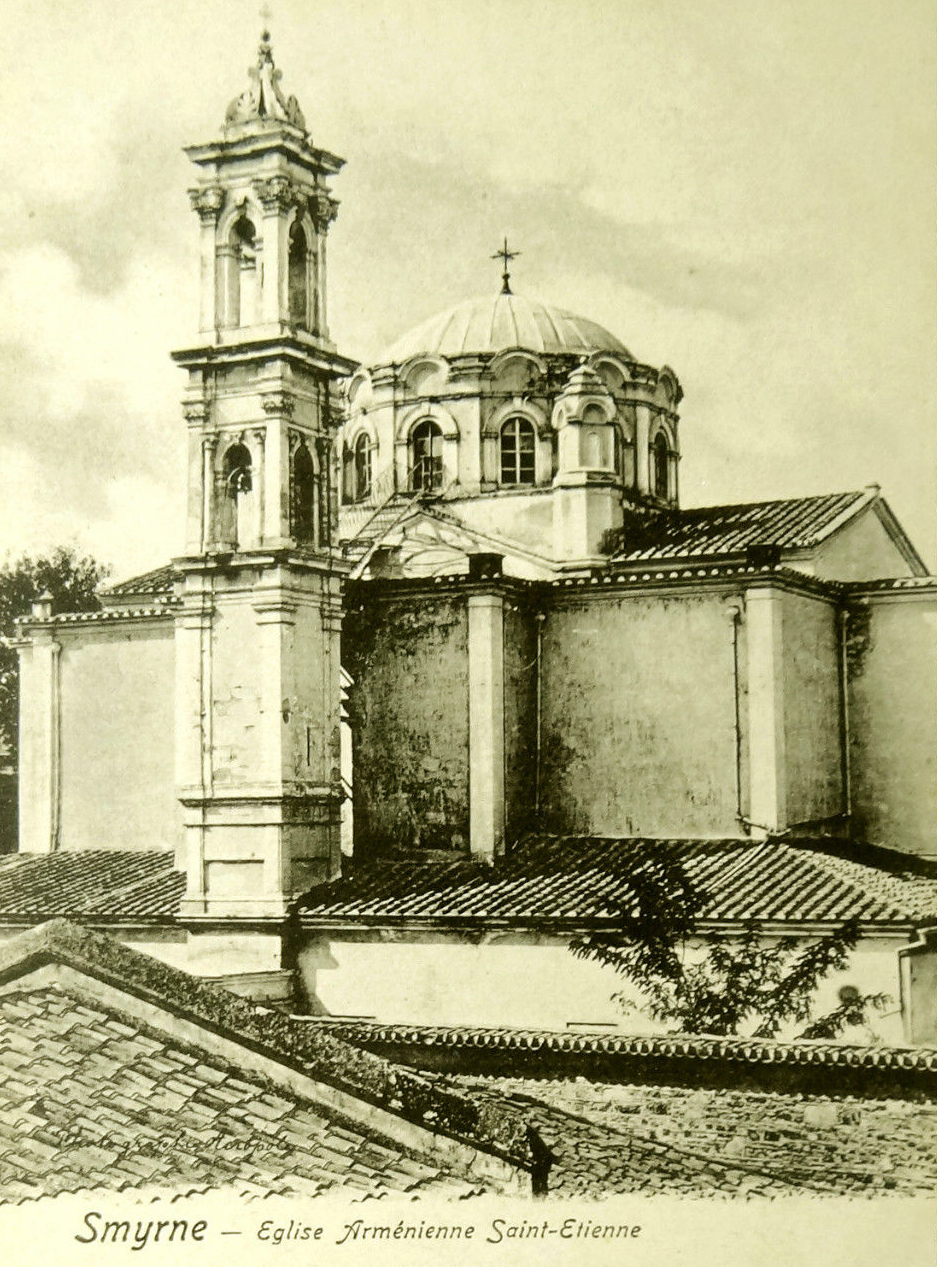
The St. Stepanos Armenian Church (1863) located in the Basmane district served the Armenian community of İzmir. It was burned during the Great Fire of Smyrna in 1922.

The first railway lines to be built within the present-day territory of Turkey went from İzmir. A 130 km (81 mi) İzmir-Aydın railway was started in 1856 and finished in 1867, a year later than the Smyrna-Cassaba Railway, itself started in 1863. In 1865 the population was estimated by the British (Hyde Clarke) at 180,000 with minorities of 80,000 Greeks, 8,000 Armenians and 10,000 Jews. The wide arc of the Smyrna-Cassaba line advancing in a wide arc to the north-west from İzmir, through the Karşıyaka suburb, contributed greatly to the development of the northern shores as urban areas. These new developments, typical of the industrial age and the way the city attracted merchants and middlemen gradually changed the demographic structure of the city, its culture and its Ottoman character. In 1867, İzmir finally became the center of its own vilayet, still called by neighboring Aydın's name but with its own administrative area covering a large part of Turkey's present-day Aegean Region.

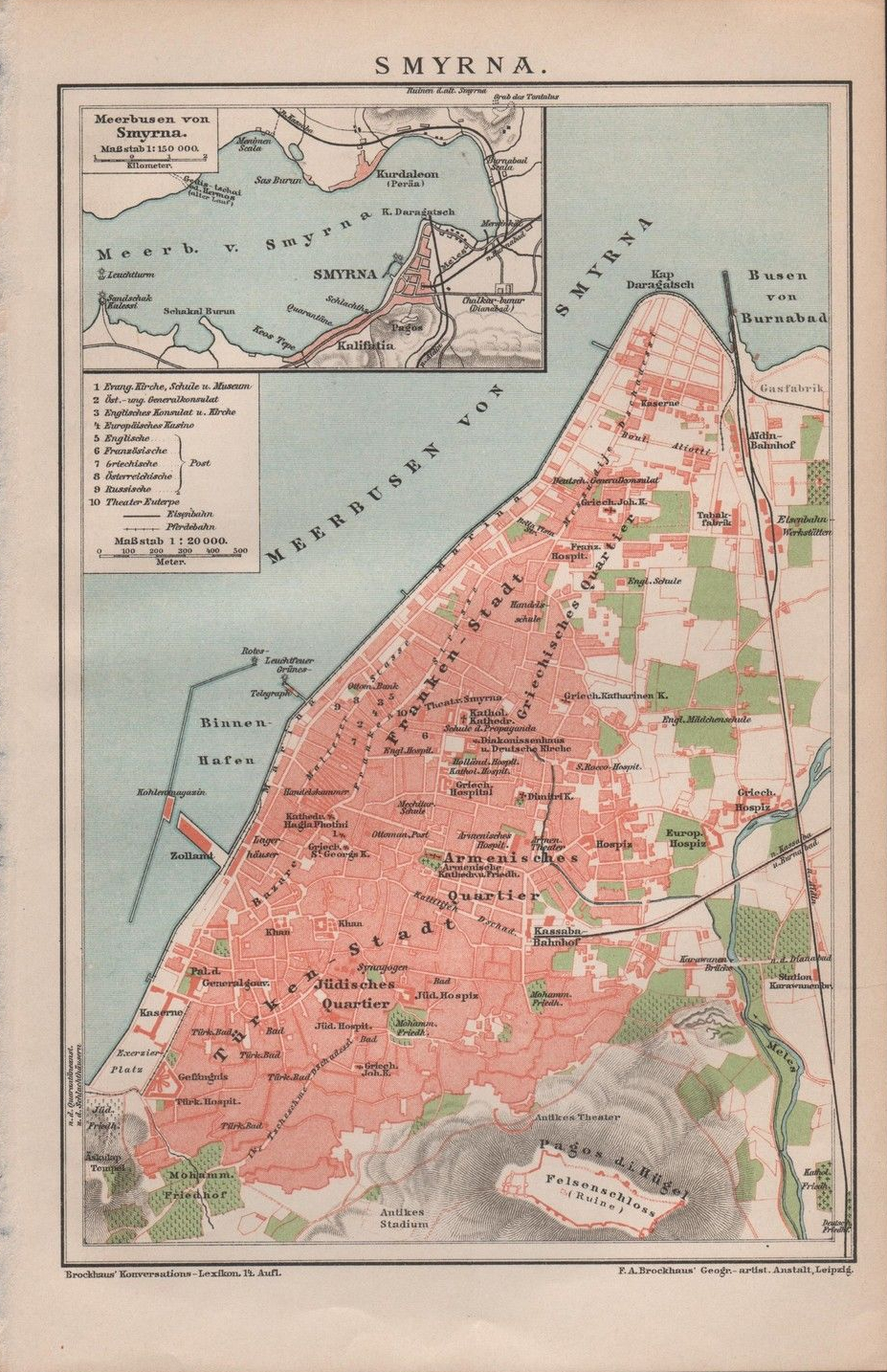
German map of Ottoman Smyrna in 1895, showing the different ethnoreligious quarters (namely Turkish, Greek, Levantine, Armenian and Jewish) of the city.

In the late 19th century, the port was threatened by a build-up of silt in the gulf and an initiative, unique in the history of the Ottoman Empire, was undertaken in 1886. In order to redirect the silt, the bed of the Gediz River was redirected to its present-day northern course, so that it no longer flowed into the gulf. The beginning of the 20th century saw İzmir take on the look of a global metropolis with a cosmopolitan city center. According to the 1893 Ottoman census, more than half of the population was Turkish, with 133,800 Greeks, 9,200 Armenians, 17,200 Jews, and 54,600 foreign nationals. According to author Katherine Flemming, by 1919, Smyrna's 150,000 Greeks made up just under half of the population, outnumbering the Turks in the city two to one, while the American Consul General, George Horton, records 165,000 Turks, 150,000 Greeks, 25,000 Jews, 25,000 Armenians, and 20,000 foreigners (Italians, French, British, Americans). According to Henry Morgenthau and Trudy Ring, before World War I, the Greeks alone numbered 130,000, out of a total population of 250,000. Moreover, according to various scholars, prior to the war, the city hosted more Greeks than Athens, the capital of Greece. The Ottoman ruling class of that era referred to the city as Infidel Smyrna (Gavur İzmir) due to its strong Greek presence.

=== Contemporary period ===
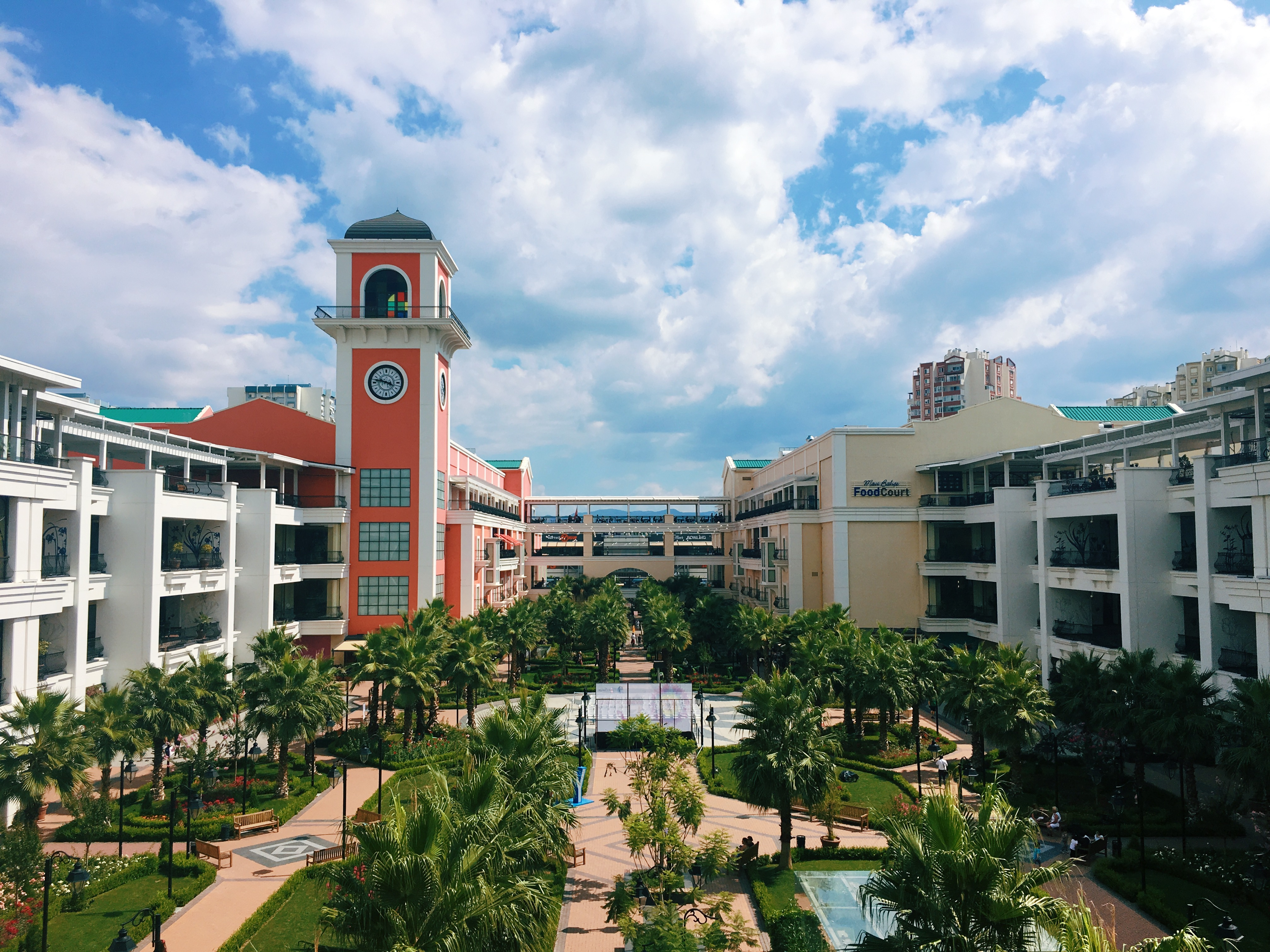
MaviBahçe

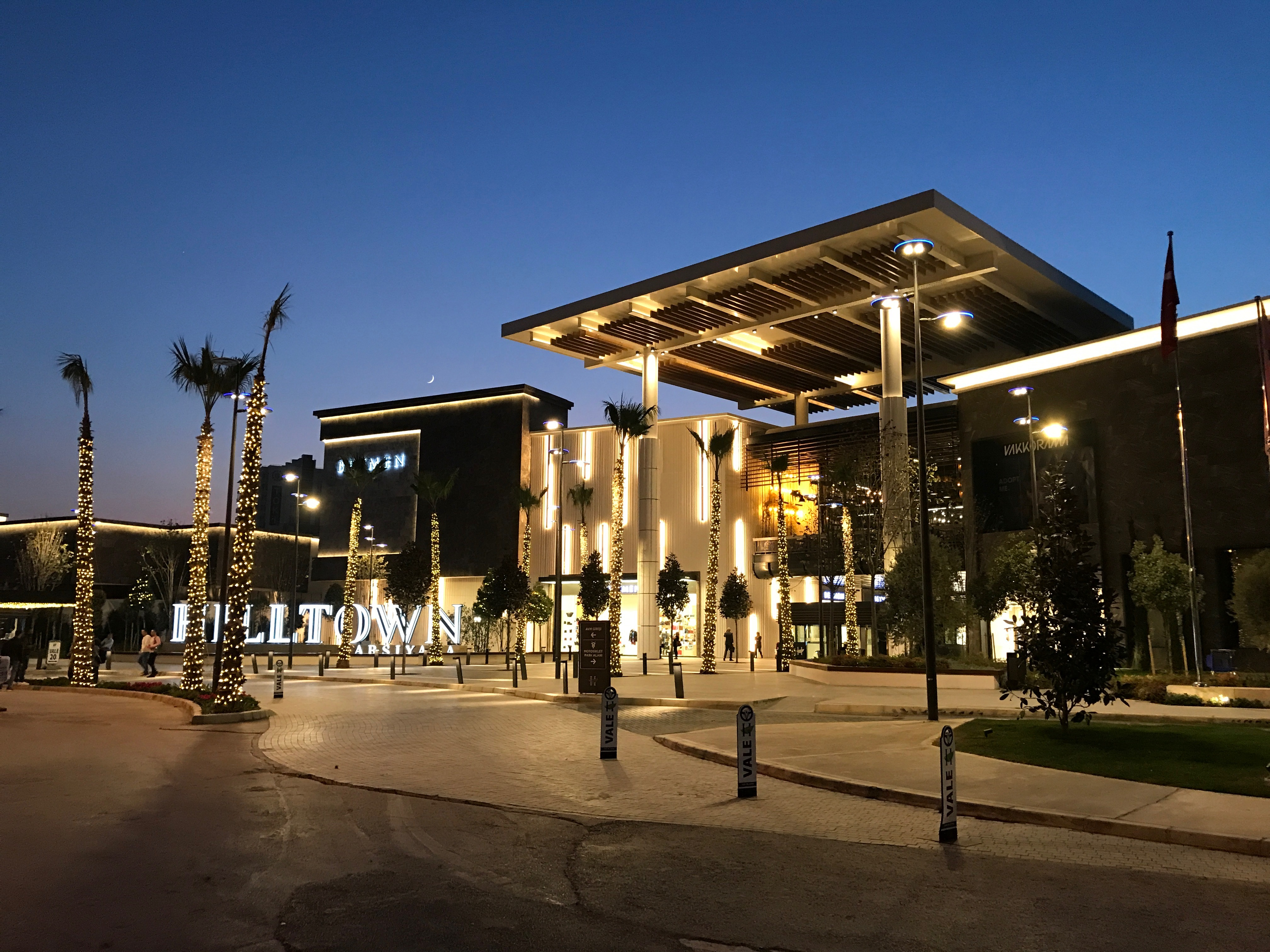
Hilltown Karşıyaka

Shopping malls in the Mavişehir quarter of Karşıyaka

Following the defeat of the Ottoman Empire in World War I, the victors had, for a time, intended to carve up large parts of Anatolia into respective zones of influence and offered the western regions of Turkey to Greece under the Treaty of Sèvres. On 15 May 1919, the Greek Army landed in Smyrna, but the Greek expedition towards central Anatolia was disastrous for both that country and for the local Greeks of Anatolia. By September 1922 the Greek army had been defeated and the last Greek soldiers left Smyrna on 8 September 1922.

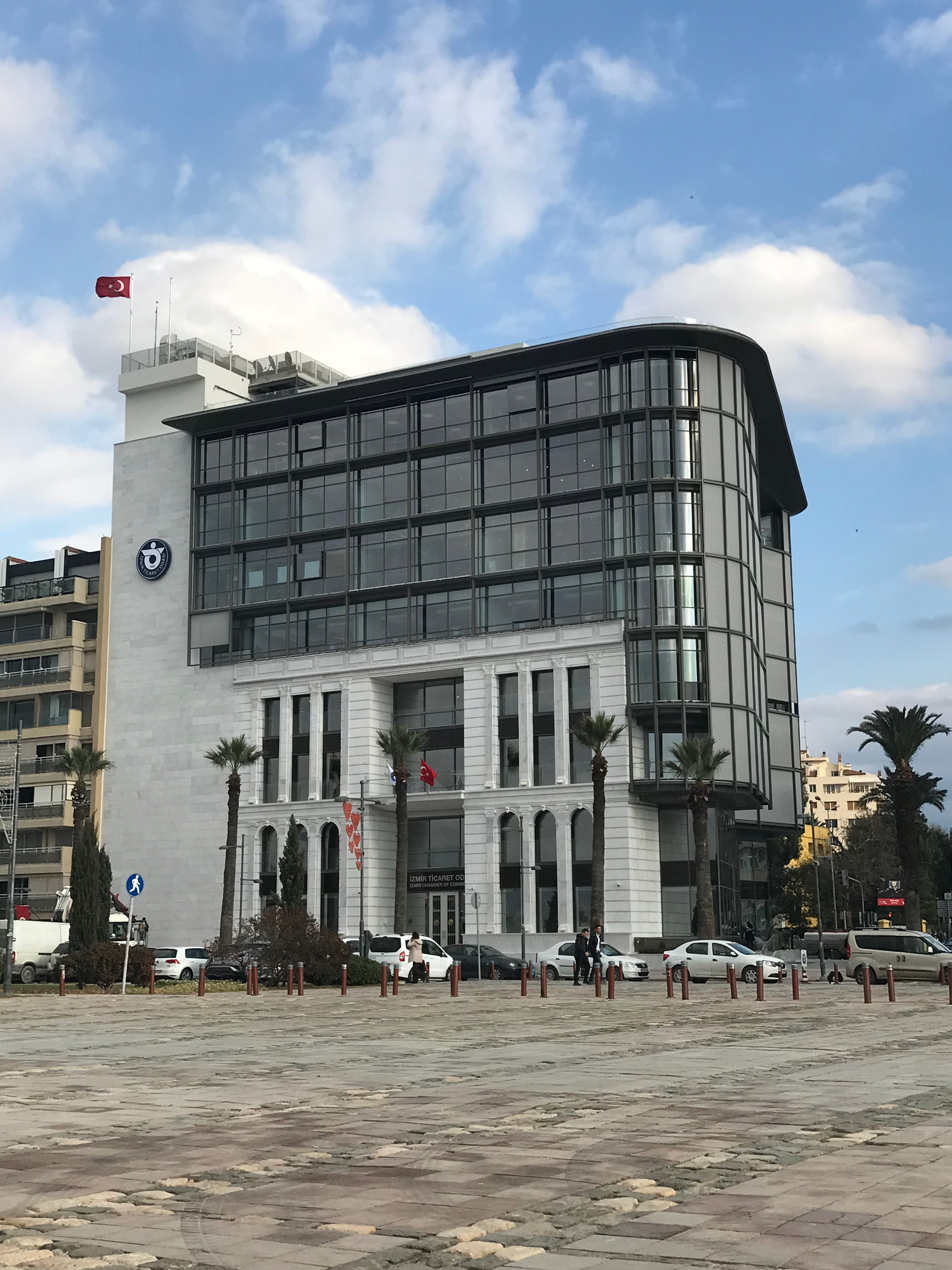
İzmir Chamber of Commerce in Konak

The Turkish Army retook possession of the city on 9 September 1922, effectively ending the Greco-Turkish War (1919–1922). Four days later, on 13 September 1922, a great fire broke out in the city, lasting until 22 September. The fire completely destroyed the Greek and Armenian quarters, while the Muslim and Jewish quarters escaped damage. Estimated Greek and Armenians deaths resulting from the fire range from 10,000 to 100,000 Approximately 50,000 to 400,000 Greek and Armenian refugees crammed the waterfront to escape from the fire and were forced to remain there under harsh conditions for nearly two weeks. The systematic evacuation of Greeks on the quay started on 24 September when the first Greek ships entered the harbor under the supervision of Allied destroyers. Some 150,000 to 200,000 Greeks were evacuated in total. The remaining Greeks were expelled to Greece in 1923, as part of the population exchange between Greece and Turkey, a stipulation of the Treaty of Lausanne, which formally ended the Greco-Turkish War.

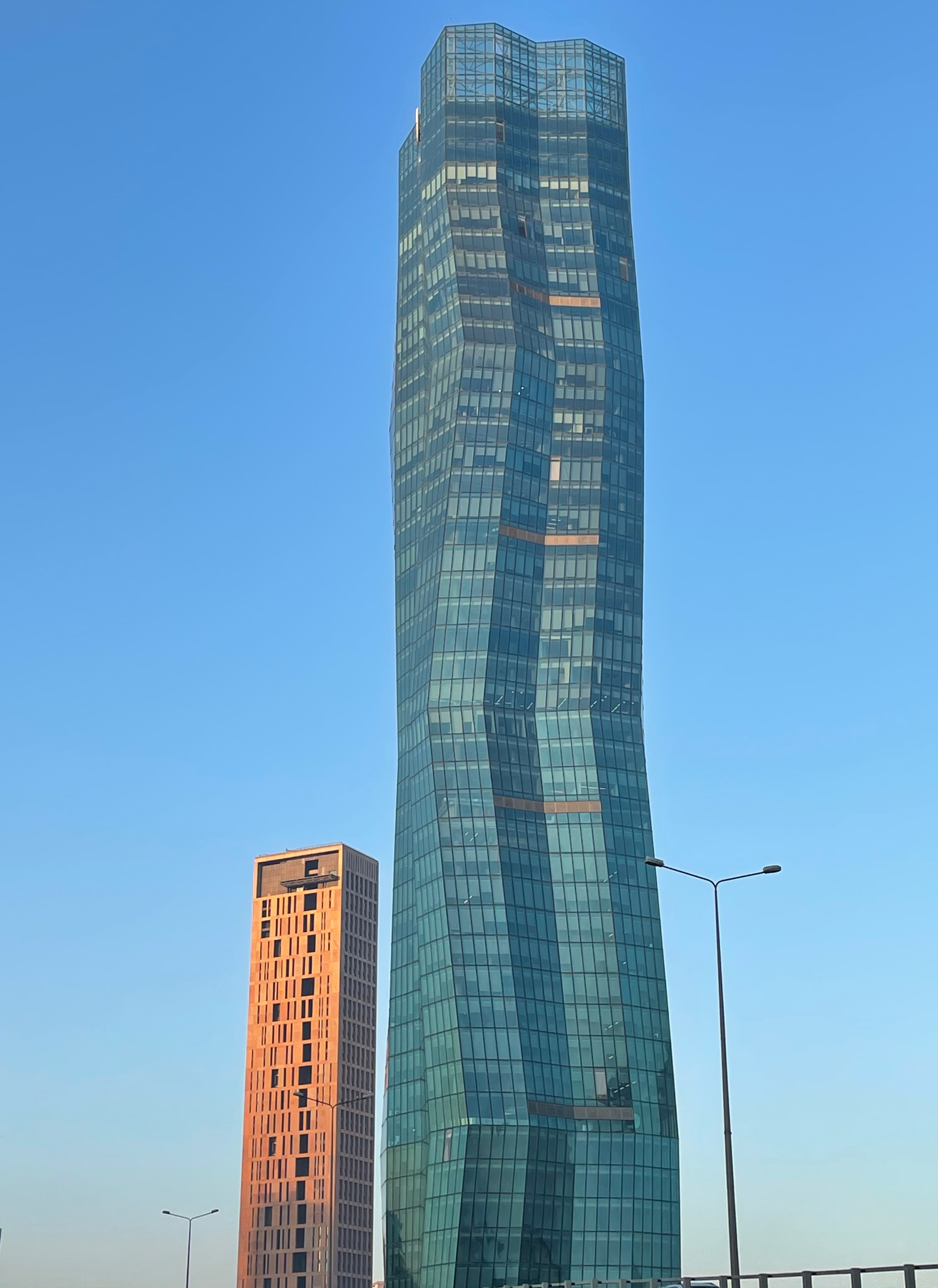
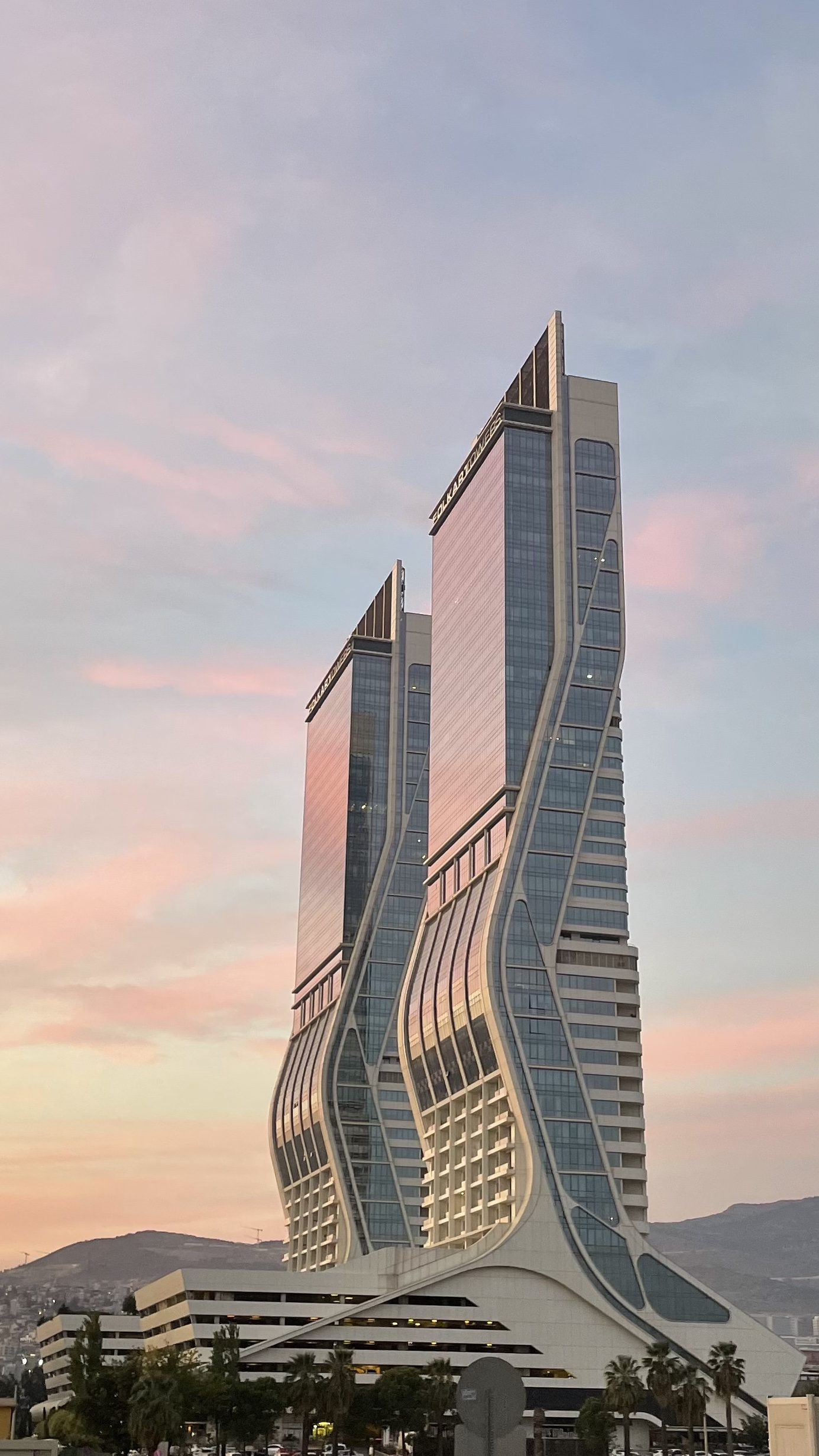
Mistral Office Tower (left) and Folkart Towers (right) in the Bayraklı district, where the city's tallest skyscrapers are located

The war, and especially the events that took place in İzmir, such as the fire, probably the greatest disaster the city has ever experienced, continue to influence the psyches of the two nations to this day. The Turks have claimed that the Greek army landing was marked from the very first day by the "first bullet" fired on Greek detachments by the journalist Hasan Tahsin and the bayonetting to death of Colonel Fethi Bey and his unarmed soldiers in the city's historic barracks (Sarı Kışla — the Yellow Barracks), for refusing to shout "Zito o Venizelos" ("Long Live Venizelos"). The Greeks, on the other hand, have cited the numerous atrocities committed by the Turkish soldiers against the Greeks and Armenians (locals or hinterland refugees) in İzmir. These include the lynching of the Orthodox Metropolitan Chrysostomos following the recapture of the city on 9 September 1922 and the slaughter of Armenian and Greek males, who were then sent to the so-called labour battalions. The city was, once again, gradually rebuilt after the proclamation of the Turkish Republic in 1923.

The city of İzmir is composed of several metropolitan districts. Of these, the district of Konak corresponds to historical İzmir, with this district's area having constituted the city's central "İzmir Municipality" (Turkish: İzmir Belediyesi) until 1984. With the formation of the "İzmir Metropolitan Municipality" (Turkish: İzmir Büyükşehir Belediyesi), the city of İzmir at first grouped together its eleven (initially nine) urban districts – namely Balçova, Bayraklı, Bornova, Buca, Çiğli, Gaziemir, Güzelbahçe, Karabağlar, Karşıyaka, Konak, and Narlıdere – and later consolidated them with an additional nine of the province's districts outside the city proper. In 2013, the passing of Act 6360 established all thirty of İzmir Province's districts as part of İzmir's metropolitan area.

In 2020, the city was damaged by the Aegean Sea earthquake and tsunami, which was the deadliest seismic event of that year. 117 people died and 1,034 more were injured in Turkey, all but one of whom were from the city of İzmir.

== Demographics ==
Population of İzmir
Year	Population	Year	Population
1595	2,000	1955	286,000
1640	35,000–40,000	1960	371,000
1660	60,000–70,000	1965	442,000
1890	200,000	1970	554,000
1918	300,000	1985	1,489,817
1927	154,000	1990	1,758,780
1935	171,000	2000	2,232,265
1940	184,000	2007	2,606,294
1945	200,000	2009	2,727,968
1950	231,000	2014	2,847,691

In 2024, the city of İzmir had a population of 2,938,292 (in eleven urban districts), while İzmir Province had a total population of 4,493,242. Its built-up (or metro) area was home to 3,264,154 inhabitants. It extends along the outlying waters of the Gulf of İzmir and inland to the north across the Gediz River Delta; to the east along an alluvial plain created by several small streams; and to slightly more rugged terrain in the south.

In recent times, İzmir metropolitan area has displayed growth, especially along the western corridor, encouraged by the Çeşme motorway and extending to districts outside the city of İzmir proper, such as Seferihisar and Urla. İzmir is also home to Turkey's second largest Jewish community after Istanbul, numbering about 2,500. The Catholic Levantines of İzmir are mostly of Genoese and to a lesser degree of French and Venetian descent.

Turkey is home to tens of thousands of black citizens descended from the African slave trade in the Ottoman Empire that can be traced back to the 14th century. Known as Afro-Turks, İzmir and the surrounding areas on the Aegean coast is a central hub for this population.

== Climate ==
İzmir has a hot-summer Mediterranean climate (Köppen climate classification: Csa, Trewartha climate classification: Cshk), which is characterized by prolonged, very hot, dry summers, and cool, rainy winters. İzmir's average yearly precipitation is quite ample, at 730.5 mm (28.76 in); however, the vast majority of the city's rainfall occurs from November through March, and there is usually very little rainfall from June to September, with frequent summer droughts. The city received its greatest daily rainfall, 145.3 mm (5.72 in), on September 29, 2006, while the highest wind speed of 127.1 km/h (79.0 mph) was recorded on March 29, 1970.

Maximum temperatures during the winter months are mostly between 10 and 16 °C (50 and 61 °F). Although it is rare, snow can fall in İzmir from December to February, which usually stays for a few hours rather than a whole day or more. The record 32 cm (13 in) of snow depth was recorded on January 31, 1945. Frost does occasionally occur at night almost every winter. During summer, the air temperature can climb as high as 40 °C (104 °F) from June to September; however, the high temperatures are usually between 30 and 36 °C (86 and 97 °F).

Etesian winds (Turkish: meltem, Greek: μελτέμι meltemi) of the Aegean Sea occur regularly in the Gulf and city of İzmir.

Climate data for İzmir (1991–2020, extremes 1938–present)
Month	Jan	Feb	Mar	Apr	May	Jun	Jul	Aug	Sep	Oct	Nov	Dec	Year
Record high °C (°F)	22.5 (72.5)	27.0 (80.6)	31.1 (88.0)	32.5 (90.5)	37.6 (99.7)	41.8 (107.2)	43.2 (109.8)	43.0 (109.4)	40.1 (104.2)	36.0 (96.8)	30.3 (86.5)	25.2 (77.4)	43.2 (109.8)
Mean daily maximum °C (°F)	12.7 (54.9)	14.0 (57.2)	17.2 (63.0)	21.3 (70.3)	26.5 (79.7)	31.3 (88.3)	33.8 (92.8)	33.6 (92.5)	29.5 (85.1)	24.6 (76.3)	18.8 (65.8)	14.0 (57.2)	23.1 (73.6)
Daily mean °C (°F)	9.0 (48.2)	9.9 (49.8)	12.4 (54.3)	16.2 (61.2)	21.1 (70.0)	26.0 (78.8)	28.6 (83.5)	28.5 (83.3)	24.2 (75.6)	19.5 (67.1)	14.4 (57.9)	10.5 (50.9)	18.4 (65.1)
Mean daily minimum °C (°F)	6.0 (42.8)	6.6 (43.9)	8.6 (47.5)	11.8 (53.2)	16.2 (61.2)	20.9 (69.6)	23.5 (74.3)	23.7 (74.7)	19.5 (67.1)	15.4 (59.7)	10.9 (51.6)	7.7 (45.9)	14.2 (57.6)
Record low °C (°F)	−8.2 (17.2)	−5.2 (22.6)	−3.8 (25.2)	0.6 (33.1)	4.3 (39.7)	9.5 (49.1)	15.4 (59.7)	11.5 (52.7)	10.0 (50.0)	3.6 (38.5)	−2.9 (26.8)	−4.7 (23.5)	−8.2 (17.2)
Average precipitation mm (inches)	127.5 (5.02)	107.2 (4.22)	77.8 (3.06)	50.1 (1.97)	32.9 (1.30)	14.4 (0.57)	3.0 (0.12)	6.7 (0.26)	23.5 (0.93)	56.5 (2.22)	99.6 (3.92)	131.3 (5.17)	730.5 (28.76)
Average precipitation days	11.57	12.00	10.23	9.00	7.10	3.67	0.67	0.83	3.07	6.67	9.07	13.30	87.2
Average relative humidity (%)	68.9	67.3	63.5	60.3	57.6	51.6	48.7	50.7	56.0	63.1	67.4	70.1	60.4
Mean monthly sunshine hours	140.4	145.5	202.6	234.3	299.1	345.2	381.6	361.0	291.1	235.9	172.6	129.3	2,938.5
Mean daily sunshine hours	4.5	5.2	6.6	7.9	9.7	11.5	12.3	11.6	9.7	7.6	5.8	4.2	8.0
Percentage possible sunshine	42	49	54	59	69	80	84	81	76	63	50	40	67
Average ultraviolet index	2	3	5	6	8	9	10	9	7	5	3	2	6
Source 1: Turkish State Meteorological Service
Source 2: NOAA (humidity, sun 1991-2020), Weather atlas (UV index)

== Main sights ==
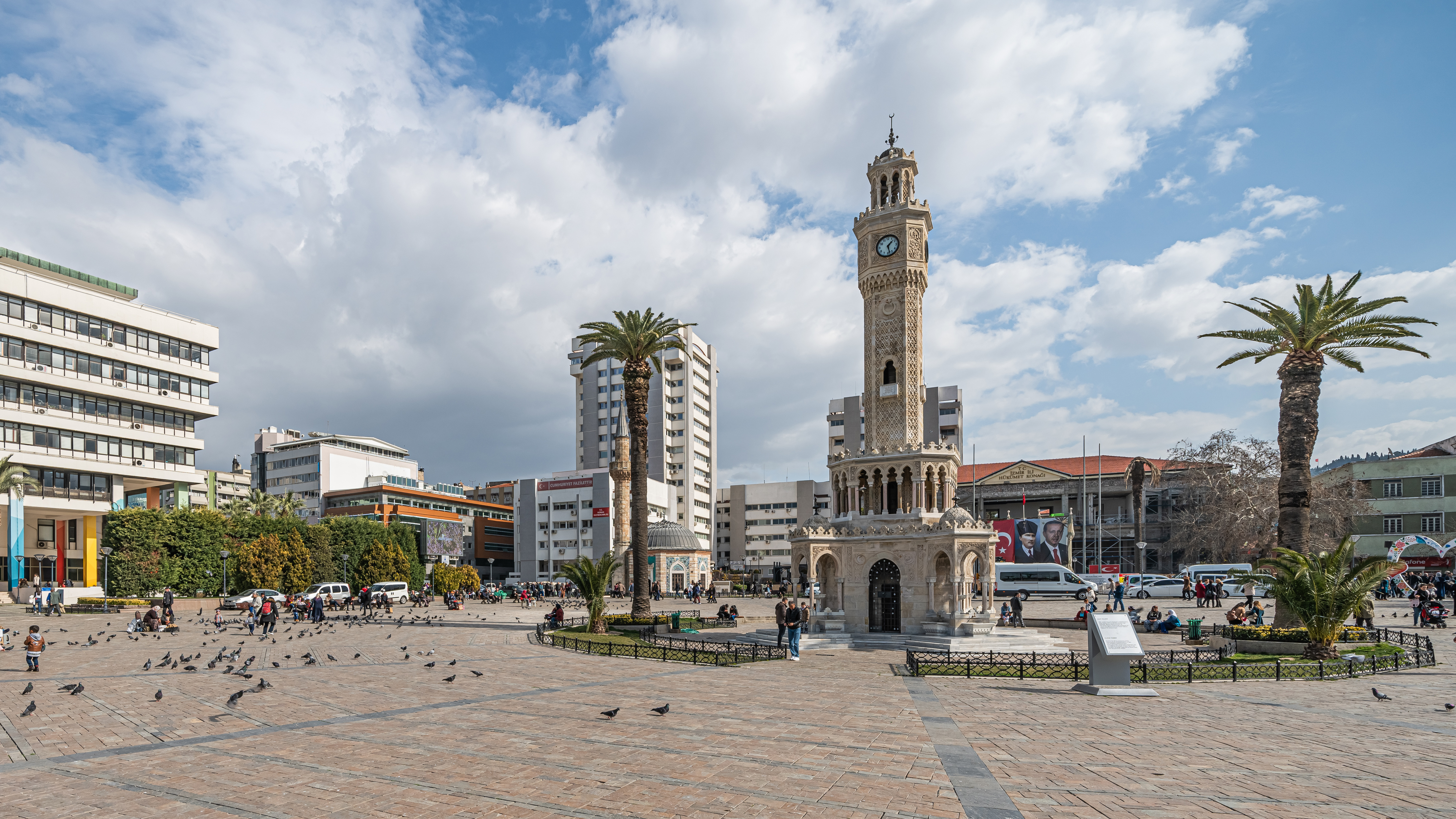
The Clock Tower is the symbol of the city.

Standing on Mount Yamanlar, the tomb of Tantalus was excavated by Charles Texier in 1835 and is an example of the historic traces in the region prior to the Hellenistic Age, along with those found in nearby Kemalpaşa and Mount Sipylus.

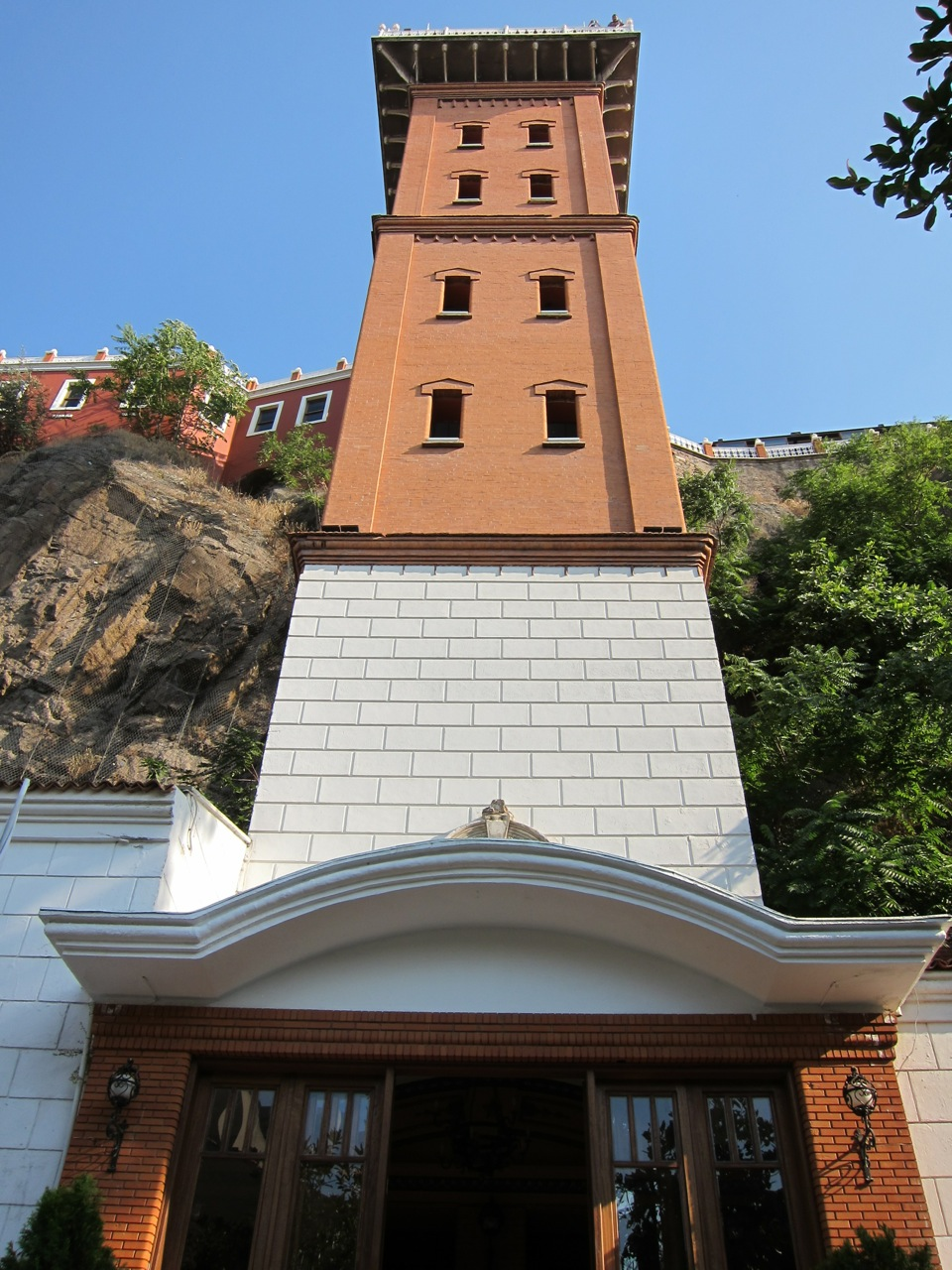
Asansör (1907) offers panoramic views of the city.

The Agora of Smyrna is well preserved, and is arranged into the Agora Open Air Museum of İzmir, although important parts buried under modern buildings wait to be brought to light. Serious consideration is also being given to uncovering the ancient theatre of Smyrna where St. Polycarp was martyred, buried under an urban zone on the slopes of Kadifekale. It was distinguishable until the 19th century, as evident by the sketches done at the time. At top of the same hill stands an ancient castle, one of İzmir's landmarks. Other ancient monument include also the Kızılçullu aqueducts in Buca district.

One of the more pronounced elements of İzmir's harbor is the Clock Tower, a marble tower in the middle of the Konak district, standing 25 m (82 ft) in height. It was designed by Levantine French architect Raymond Charles Père in 1901 to commemorate the 25th anniversary of the ascension of Abdülhamid II to the Ottoman throne in 1876. The tower features four fountains placed around the base in a circular pattern, and the columns are inspired by North African themes.

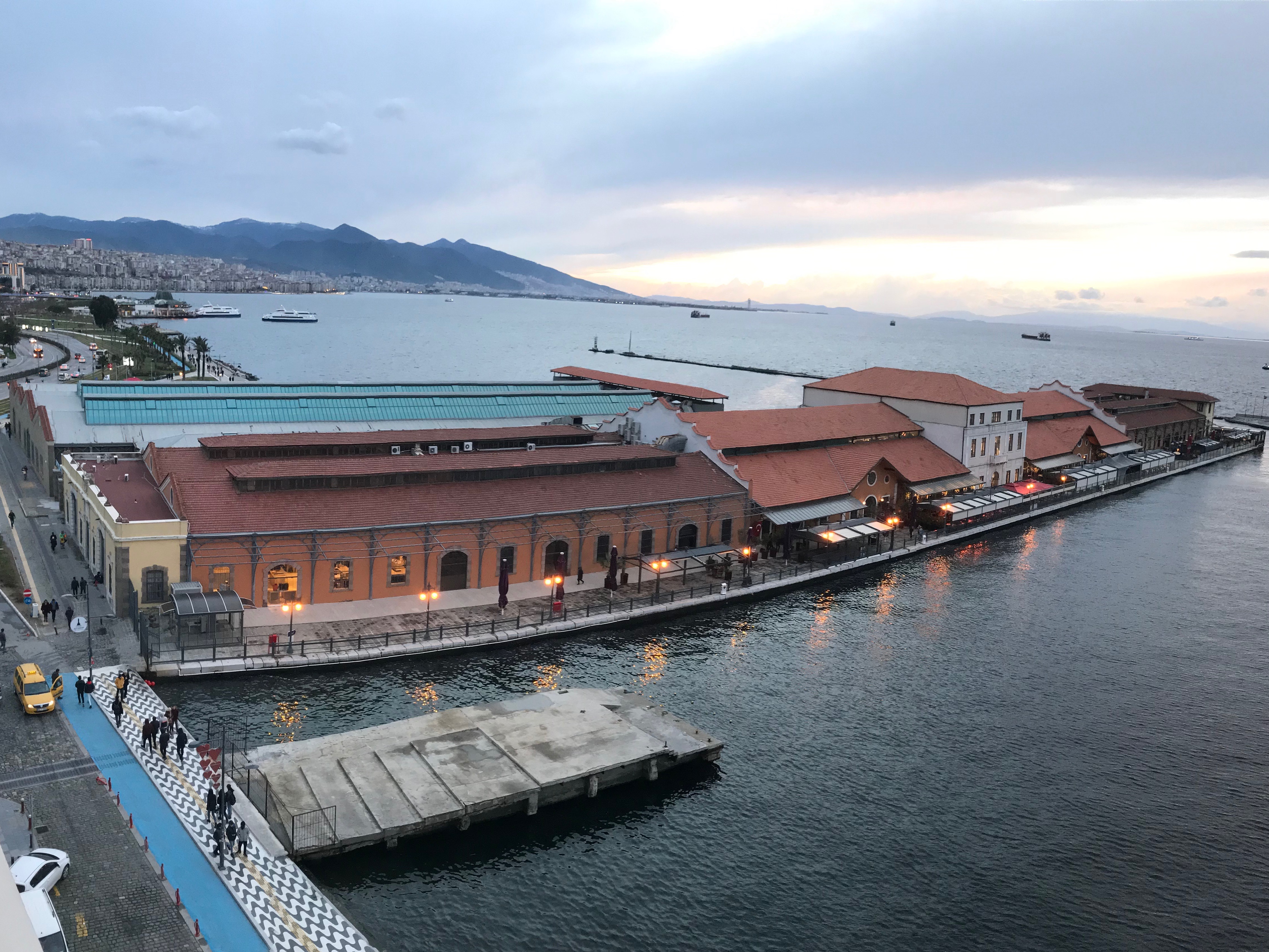
Designed by Gustave Eiffel in 1890, the Konak Pier has numerous shops, cafés and restaurants.

The Kemeraltı bazaar zone set up by the Ottomans, combined with the Agora, rests near the slopes of Kadifekale. İzmir has had three castles historically – Kadifekale (Pagos), the portuary Ok Kalesi (Neon Kastron, St. Peter), and Sancakkale, which remained vital to İzmir's security for centuries. Sancakkale is situated in the present-day İnciraltı quarter between the Balçova and Narlıdere districts, on the southern shore of the Gulf of İzmir. It is at a key point where the strait allows entry into the innermost tip of the Gulf at its narrowest, and due to shallow waters through a large part of this strait, ships have sailed close to the castle.

There are nine synagogues in İzmir, concentrated either in the traditional Jewish quarter of Karatas or in Havra Sokak (Synagogue street) in Kemeraltı, and they all bear the signature of the 19th century when they were built or re-constructed in depth on the basis of former buildings.

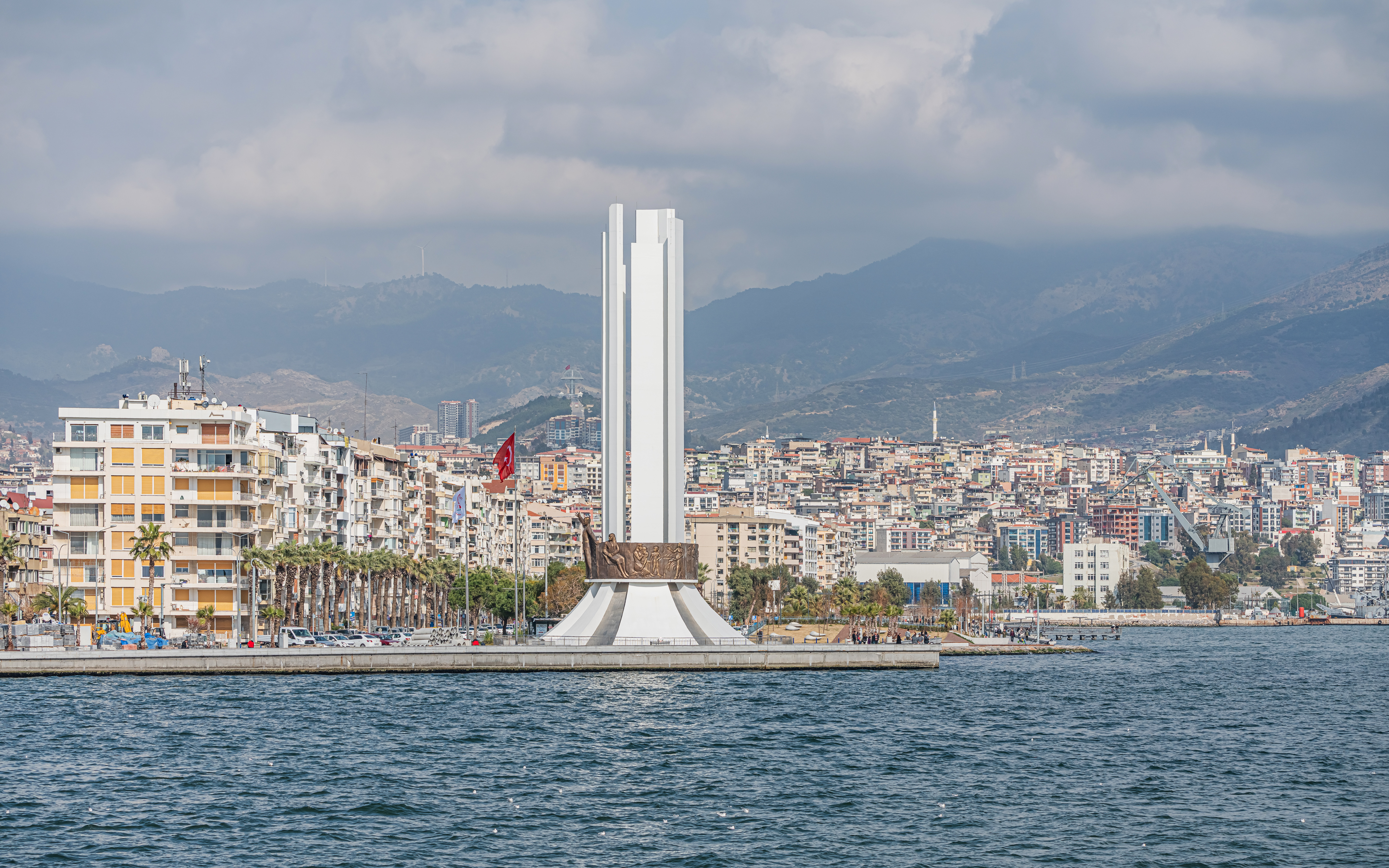
The Atatürk, His Mother and Women's Rights Monument in the Karşıyaka district of İzmir

The Atatürk Mask (Turkish: Atatürk Maskı) is a large concrete relief of the head of Mustafa Kemal Atatürk, founder of modern Turkey, located to the south of Kadifekale the historical castle of İzmir.

The İzmir Bird Paradise (İzmir Kuş Cenneti) in Çiğli, a bird sanctuary near Karşıyaka, has 205 recorded species of birds, including 63 species that are resident year-round, 54 species of summer migratory birds, 43 species of winter migratory birds, and 30 transient species. 56 species of birds have bred in the park. The sanctuary, which covers 80 square kilometres, was registered as "the protected area for water birds and for their breeding" by the Turkish Ministry of Forestry in 1982. A large open-air zoo was established in the same district of Çiğli in 2008 under the name Sasalı Park of Natural Life.

== Culture ==
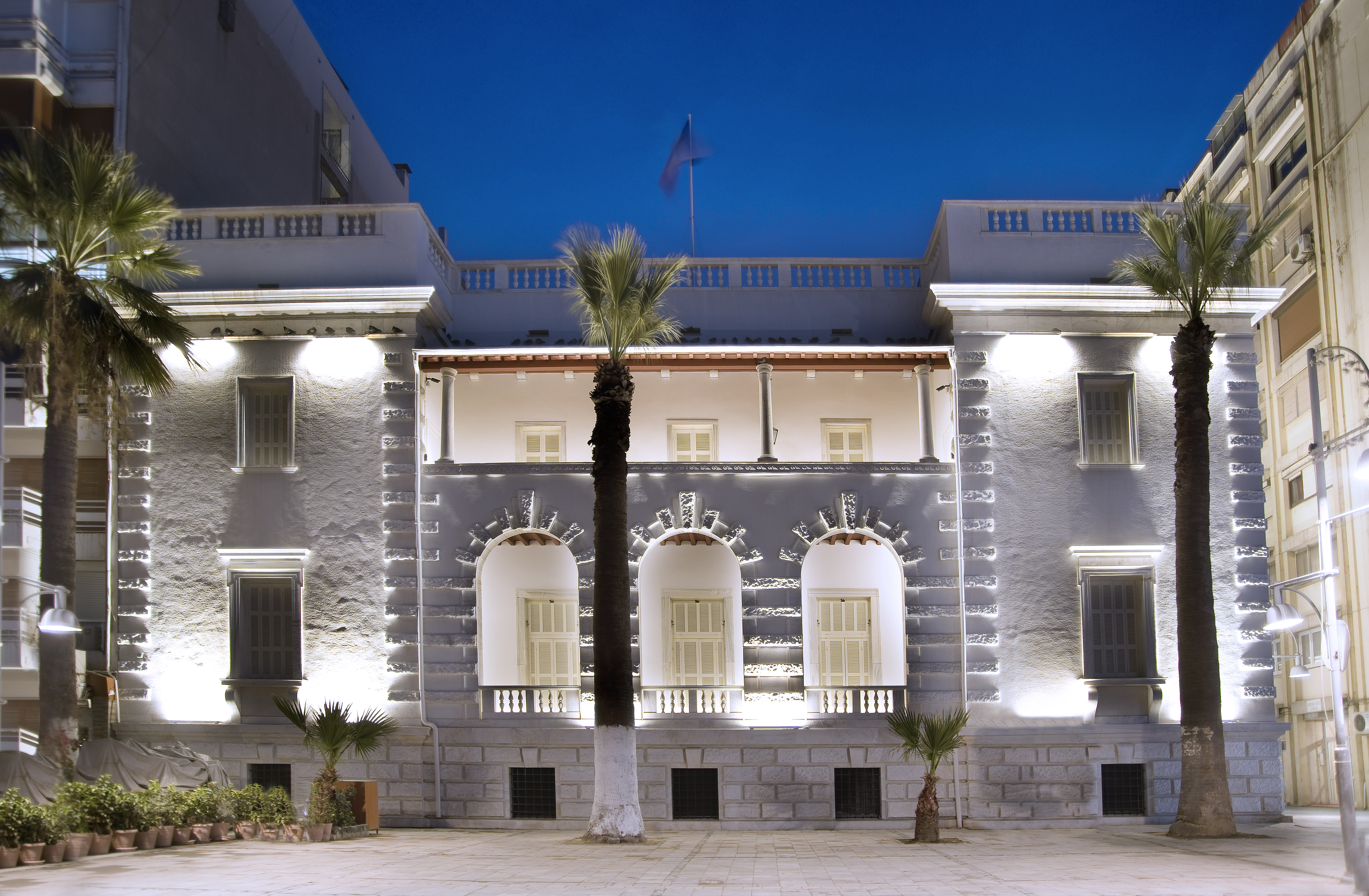
Arkas Art Centre in Kültür

=== Museums ===
The most remarkable museums in İzmir are located in Konak, the city centre. Built for the French Consulate-General in 1906, the seashore façade of the building, the Arkas Art Centre, has become one of the most venerable cultural hubs after its acquisition by private initiative in 2011. İzmir Archeological Museum is one of the largest museums in the city, with over 200 thousand artefacts of Ancient Greek, Roman, and Byzantine heritage. The former St. Roche Hospital is now in use as the Ethnography Museum, which is dedicated to the Turkish and Ottoman legacy.

İzmir Art and Sculpture Museum is another tourist attraction ─ the exhibitions held by the Turkish government introduce pieces from all over Europe to art enthusiasts. The other featuring museums within the urban sprawl include İzmir Women's Museum, which promotes the influential Turkish women, the İzmir Mask Museum, the first of its kind in Turkey with over 300 pieces of masks, TCDD 3rd Region Museum and Art Gallery, a railway museum located next to the Alsancak Gar, the İzmir History and Art Museum, featuring ancient artefacts recovered through modern excavations, the İzmir Atatürk Museum, a personal collection of Mustafa Kemal Atatürk and İsmet İnönü's items for the period they stayed in İzmir, and the Ahmet Piriştina Urban Archive and Museum, preserving late-modern İzmir's cultural heritage, historical structures, and the local government documents from the 19th century to this day. The Agora of Smyrna, a Tentative World Heritage Site, enjoys a rich variety of cultural, economic, and political buildings as the previous city centre of Smyrna. It is one of the largest agoras in the world that are located in urban area.

The opposite shore of the Gulf of İzmir, Karşıyaka, is home to the Bostanlı Open-air Archaeological Museum, featuring pillars and sculptures from 10th century BC to 3rd century AD. On the west end of the city, in Balçova, the İnciraltı Sea Museum operated by the Turkish Naval Forces displays the submarine TCG Piri Reis, the frigate TCG Ege with a naval utility helicopter, and the missile boat TCG Kasırga. In addition, a collection of Ottoman, Republican, and present naval uniforms, decorations, firearms, and weapon systems is available within the adjacent building.

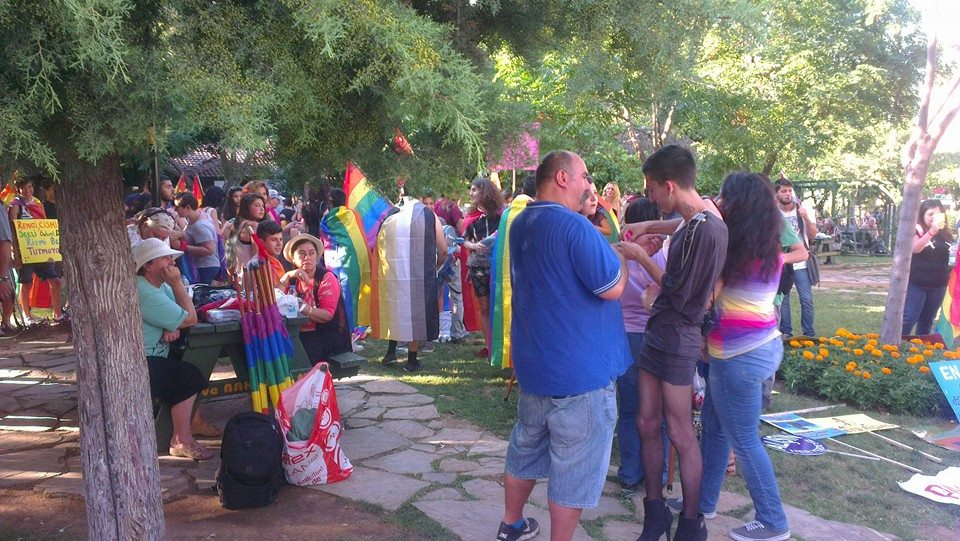
İzmir Pride in 2014

=== LGBT culture ===
İzmir is often considered the "most liberal city in Turkey". Having held first in 2012, İzmir Pride peaked by 50,000 participants in 2018, the second largest in Muslim-majority countries after Istanbul. The democratic backsliding ended up with a ban on pride parades by the central government, yet people still preserve the annual tradition through tricking the police with bait pre-set event date and locations.

The local government has a dedicated directorate to address the challenges encountered by LGBTQ+ individuals, and many politicians openly engage in activities to cooperate with the civil society.

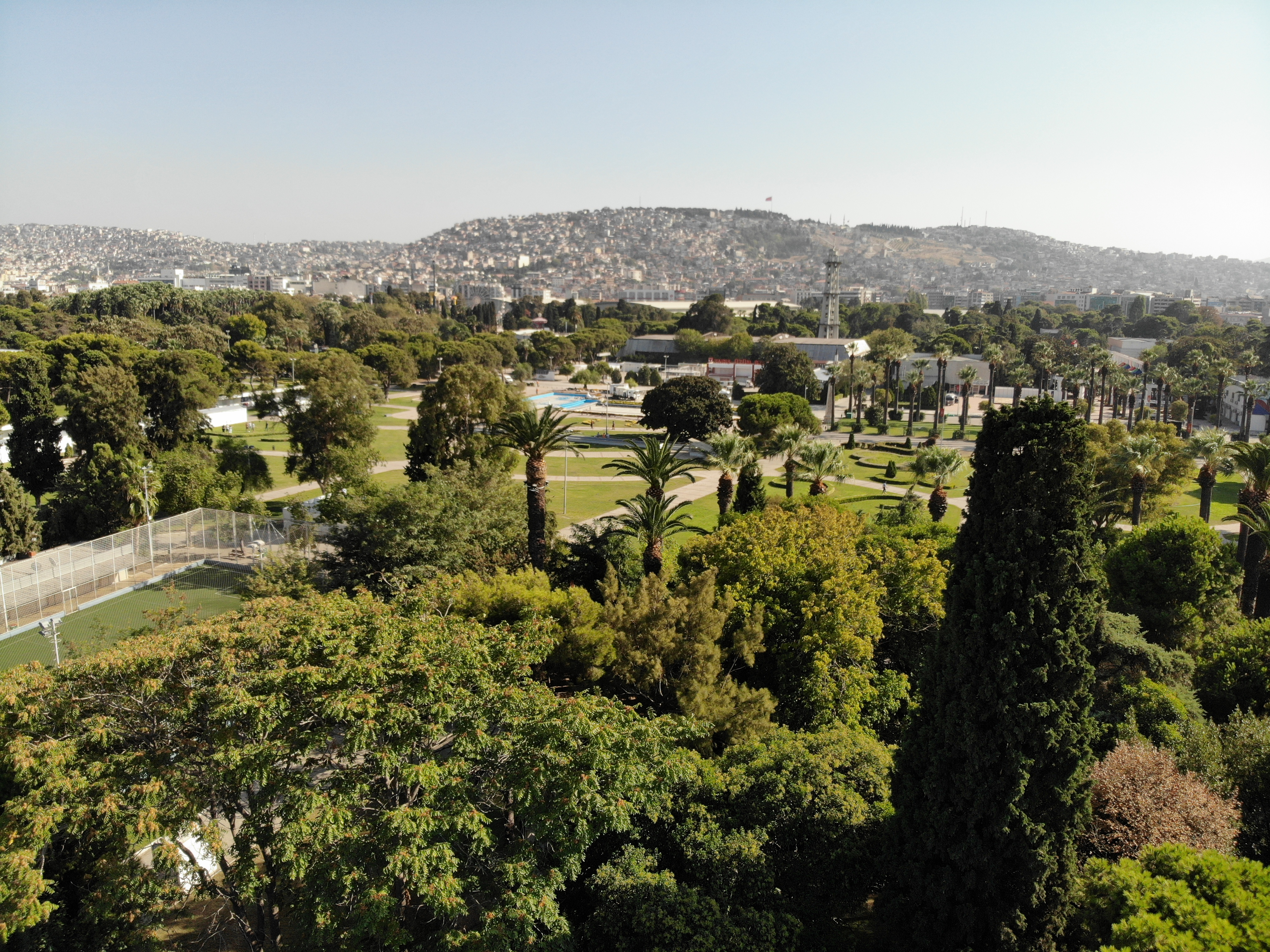
A view of Kültürpark in central İzmir

=== İzmir International Fair ===
İzmir prides itself with its busy schedule of trade fairs, exhibitions and congresses. The fair and the festival are held in the compound of İzmir's vast inner city park named Kültürpark in the first days of September, and organized by İZFAŞ, a depending company of İzmir Metropolitan Municipality.

=== Festivals ===
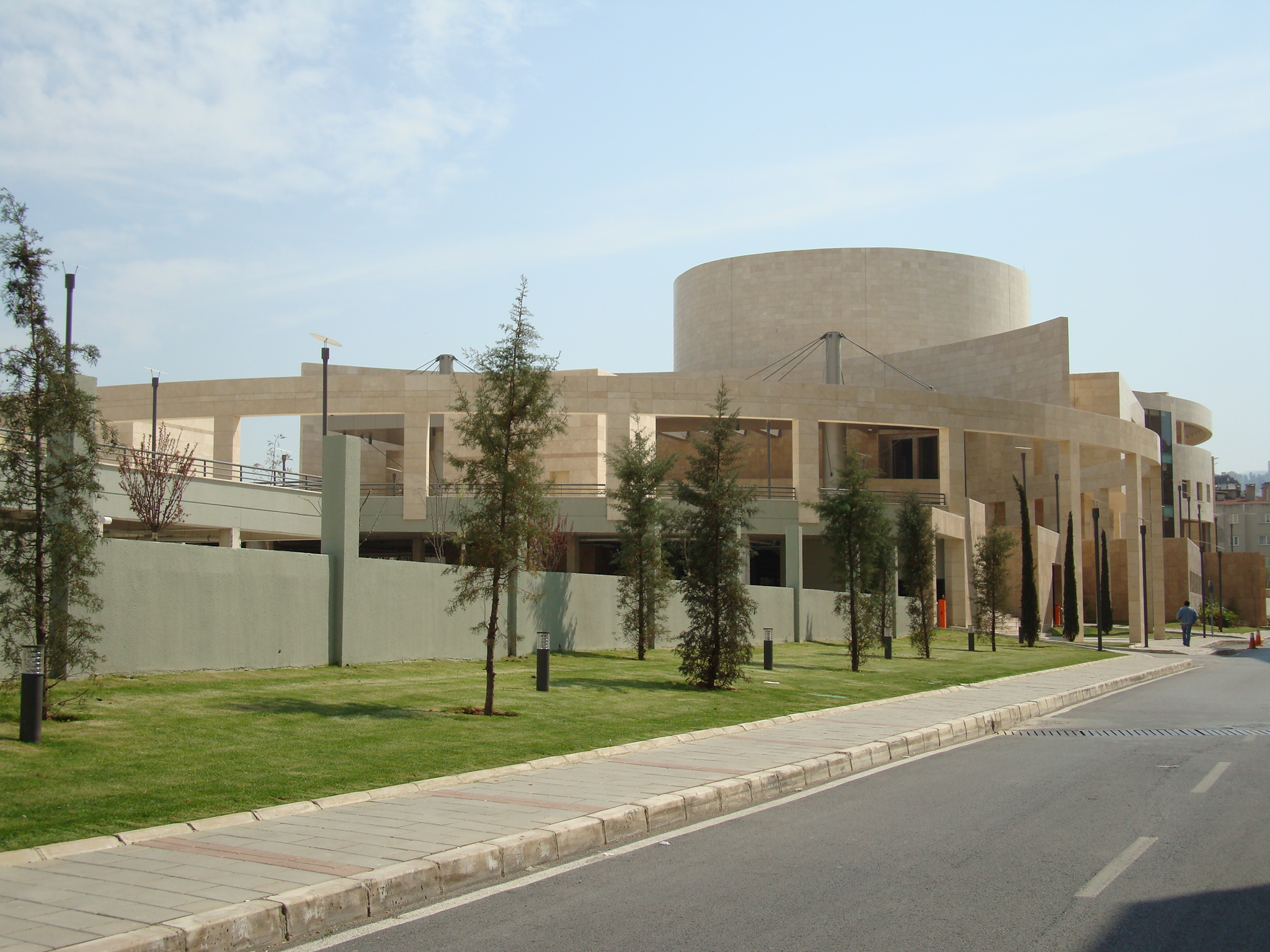
Ahmed Adnan Saygun Arts Center

The annual International İzmir Festival, which begins in mid-June and continues until mid-July, has been organized every year since 1987. During the festival, many world-class performers such as soloists and virtuosi, orchestras, dance companies, rock and jazz groups have given recitals and performances at various venues in the city and its surrounding areas; including the ancient theatres at Ephesus (near Selçuk) and Metropolis (an ancient Ionian city situated near the town of Torbalı.) The festival is a member of the European Festivals Association since 2003.

The İzmir European Jazz Festival is among the numerous events organized every year by the İKSEV (İzmir Foundation for Culture, Arts and Education) since 1994. The festival aims to bring together masters and lovers of jazz with the aim to generate feelings of love, friendship and peace.

The International İzmir Short Film Festival is organized since 1999 and is a member of the European Coordination of Film Festivals.

İzmir Metropolitan Municipality has built the Ahmet Adnan Saygun Art Center on a 21,000 m^{2} land plot in the Güzelyalı district, in order to contribute to the city's culture and art life. The acoustics of the center have been prepared by ARUP which is a noted company in this field.

=== Music ===
In 2015 the Barış Youth Symphony Orchestra was founded, incorporating children with limited opportunities in low-income regions of the city, with the purpose to keep them away from crime on the street. The orchestra, grown up to nearly one hundred members, gives concerts accompanied by notable classic music artists.

=== Cuisine ===
İzmir's cuisine has largely been affected by its multicultural history, hence the large variety of food originating from the Aegean and Mediterranean regions. Population movement from Eastern and South East Anatolia regions has enriched the local cuisine. Another factor is the large and fertile area of land surrounding the region which grows a rich selection of vegetables. There is considerable culinary usage of green leaf vegetables and wild plants amongst the residents, especially those with insular heritage, such as the immigrants from Crete. Some of the common dishes found here are the tarhana soup (made from dried yoghurt and tomatoes), "İzmir" köfte, sulu köfte, keşkek (boiled wheat with meat), zerde (sweetened rice with saffron) and mücver (made from zucchine and eggs). A Sephardic contribution to the Turkish cuisine, boyoz and lokma are pastries associated with İzmir. Kumru is a special kind of sandwich that is associated particularly with the Çeşme district and features cheese and tomato in its basics, with sucuk also added sometimes.

== Economy ==
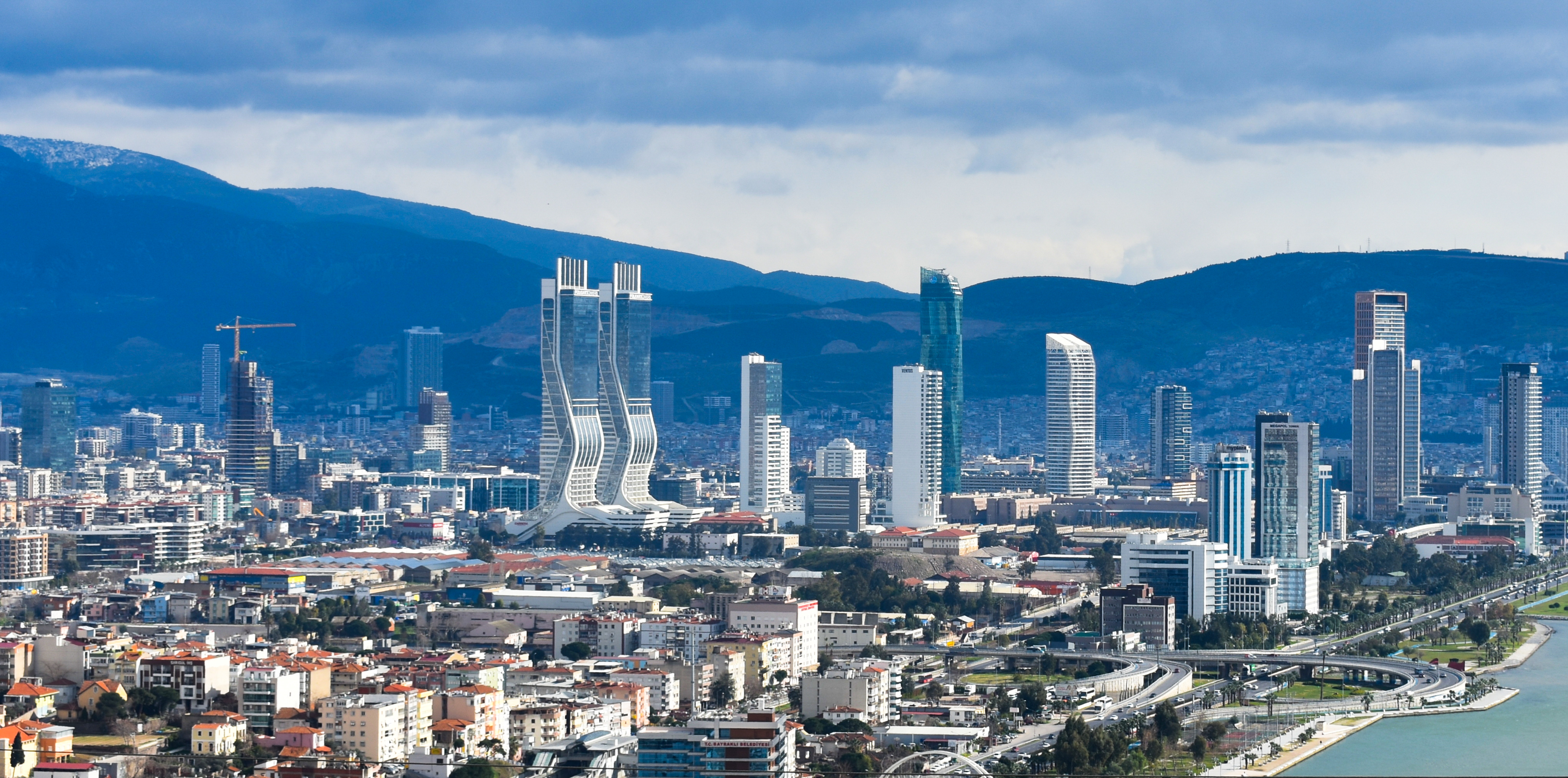
Skyscrapers in the Bayraklı district of İzmir

The port of İzmir is Turkey's main port for exports in terms of the freight handled and its free zone is the leader among the twenty in Turkey. The workforce, and particularly its rising class of young professionals, is concentrated either in the city or in its immediate vicinity (such as in Manisa and Turgutlu), and as either larger companies or SMEs, affirm their names with an increasingly wider global scale and intensity.

Trade through the city's port had a determinant importance for the economy of the Ottoman Empire at the beginning of the 19th century and the economic foundations of the early decades of Turkey's Republican era were also laid here during the İzmir Economic Congress.

At present, İzmir area's economy is divided in value between various types of activities, as follows: 30.5% for industry, 22.9% for trade and related services, 13.5% for transportation and communication and 7.8% for agriculture. In 2008, İzmir provided 10.5% of all tax revenues collected by Turkey and its exports corresponded to 6% and its imports to 4% of Turkey's foreign trade.

The province as a whole is Turkey's third largest exporter after Istanbul and Bursa, and the fifth largest importer. 85–90% of the region's exports and approximately one fifth of all Turkish exports are made through the Port of Alsancak with an annual container loading capacity of close to a million.

== Sports ==
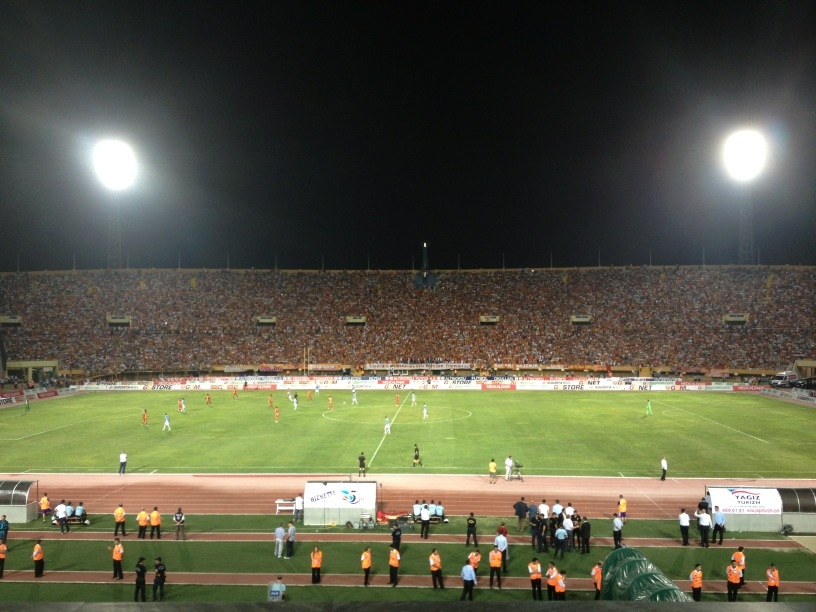
İzmir Atatürk Stadium, which has a seating capacity of 51,295, hosted the 1971 Mediterranean Games, the 2005 Summer Universiade and the 2011 European Team Championships, among other track and field events. It is also used by İzmir's football clubs.

Several important international sports events have been held in İzmir:

- 26–28 April 2013 – 2012–13 FIBA EuroChallenge Final Four,
- 18–19 June 2011 – 2011 European Team Championships First League,
- 28 August – 2 September 2010 – Group D of the 2010 FIBA World Championship,
- 3–13 September 2009 – Groups A, C, E, Semifinals & Final of the 2009 Men's European Volleyball Championship,
- 7–11 May 2008 – The 7th WTF World Junior Taekwondo Championship,
- 4–9 July 2006 – The 2006 European Seniors Fencing Championship,
- 14–23 July 2006 – The U20 European Basketball Championship for Men,
- 7–22 August 2005 – The 2005 Summer Universiade, the International University Sports Games,
- 2–7 September 2005 – Preliminary games of the 2005 European Women's Basketball Championship,
- 6–17 October 1971 – The 1971 Mediterranean Games.

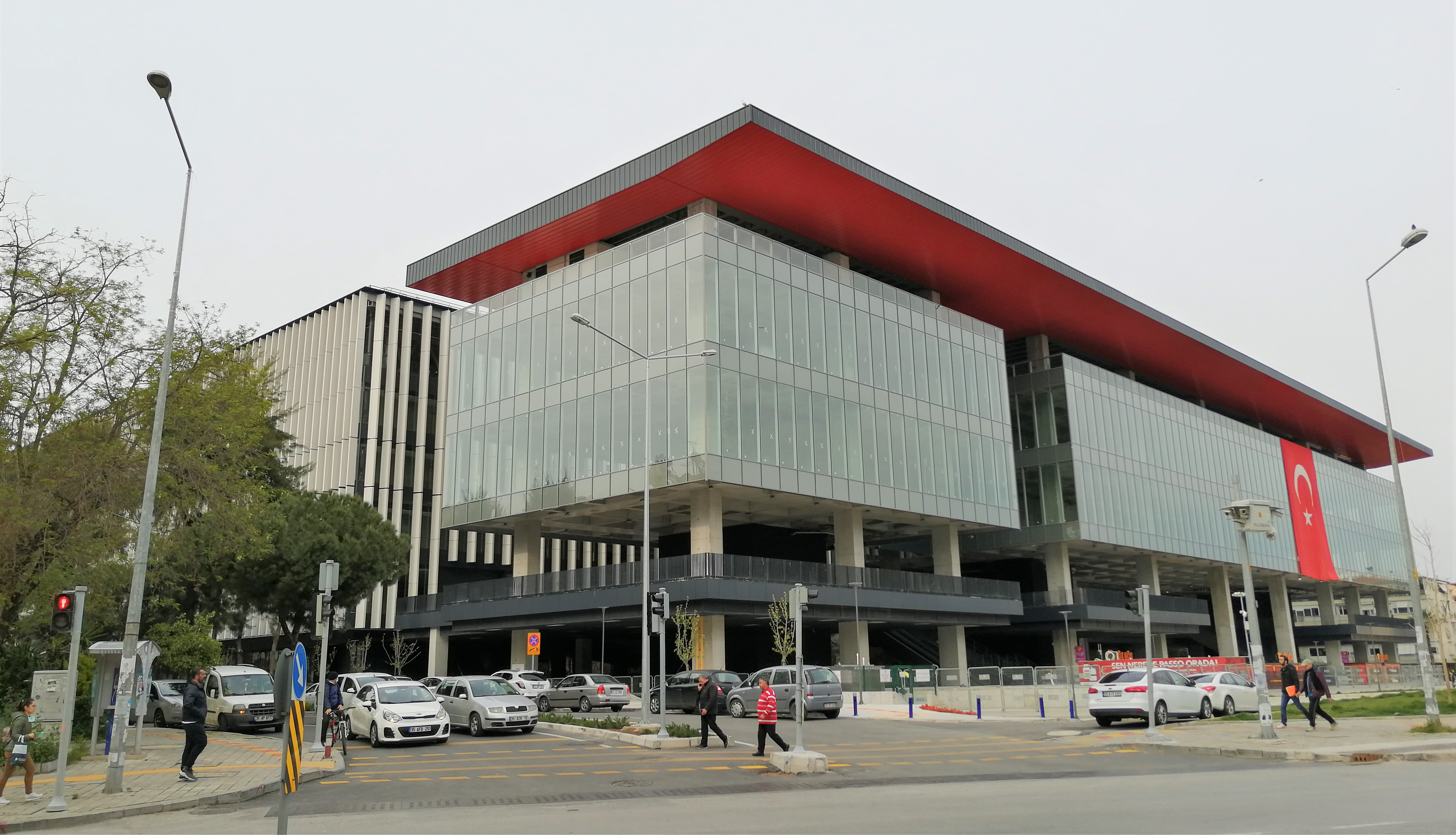
Gürsel Aksel Stadium, with a seating capacity of 20,040, is the home of Göztepe S.K. in Konak, İzmir.

The 51,295 capacity (all-seater) İzmir Atatürk Stadium regularly hosts, apart from Turkish Super League games of İzmir-based teams, many other Super League and Turkish Cup derby matches.

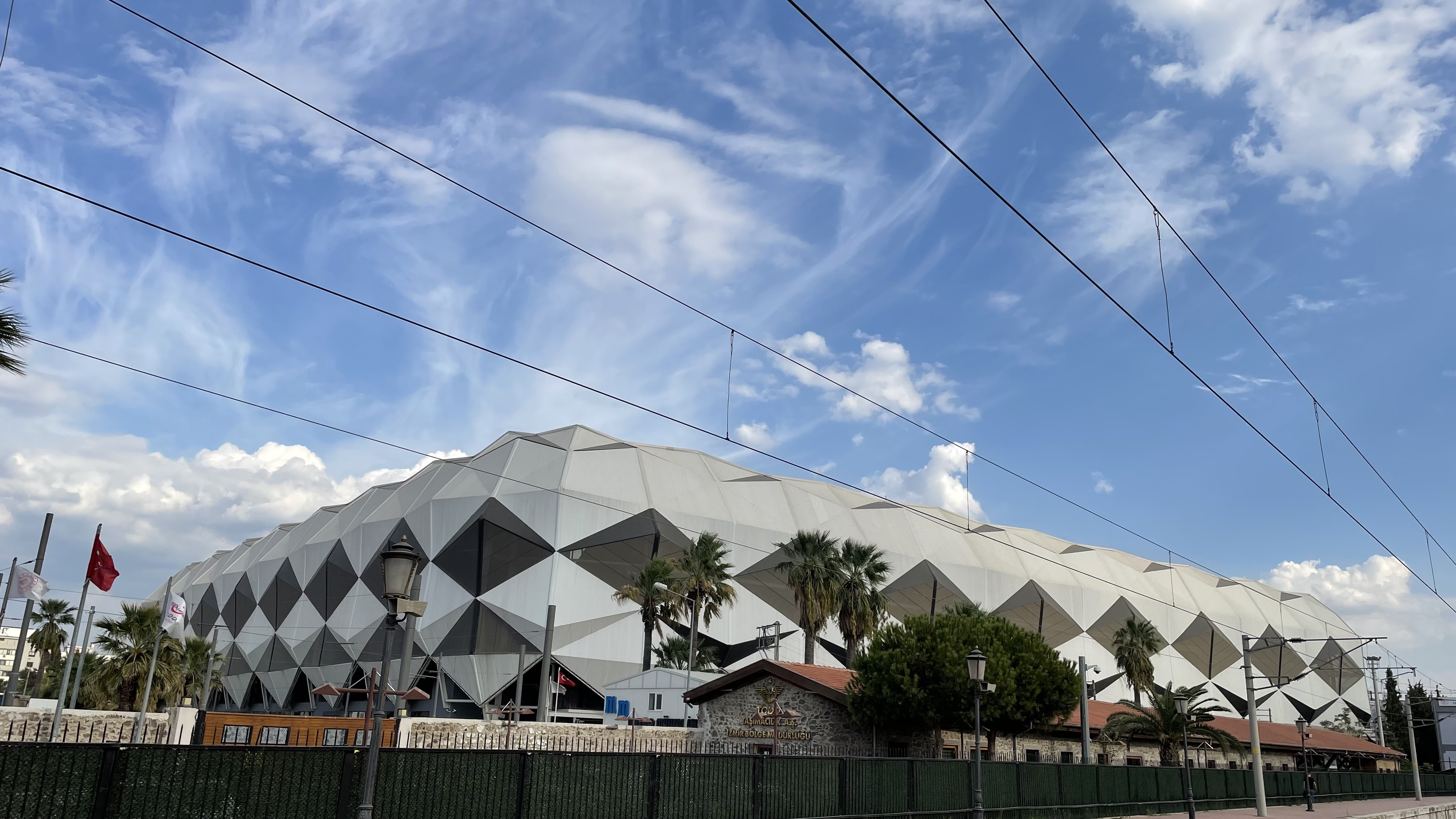
Renovated İzmir Alsancak Stadium has a seating capacity of 15,358.

The three big football clubs in İzmir are Altay (42 seasons in Süper Lig), Göztepe (30 seasons in Süper Lig), and Karşıyaka (16 seasons in Süper Lig). Other notable football clubs include: Bucaspor 1928, Altınordu, Menemen F.K., and İzmirspor. Bucaspor, now dissolved, were relegated from the top tier, Turkish Super League, at the end of the 2010–11 season.

Göztepe made sports history in Turkey by having played the semi-finals of the Inter-Cities Fairs Cup (which later became the UEFA Cup) in the 1968–69 season, and the quarter-finals of the UEFA Cup Winners' Cup in the 1969–70 season; becoming the first ever Turkish football club to play a semi-final game in Europe and the only one for two decades, until Galatasaray reached the semi-finals of the 1988–89 European Cup.

Göztepe and Altay have won the Turkish Cup twice for İzmir and all of İzmir's teams have periodically jumped in and out of Süper Lig. Historically, İzmir is also the birthplace of two Greek sports clubs, namely the multi-sport club Panionios and association football club Apollon Smyrnis which were founded in the city and moved to Athens after 1922.

Karşıyaka's basketball department Karşıyaka Basket won the Turkish Basketball League twice (in the 1986–87 and 2014–15 seasons), the Turkish Cup once (in the 2013–14 season) and the Presidential Cup twice (in 1987 and 2014). The team plays its games at the Karşıyaka Arena. The 10,000 capacity (all-seater) Halkapınar Sport Hall is currently İzmir's largest indoor sports arena and was among the venues of the 2010 FIBA World Championship in Turkey.

Arkas Spor is a successful volleyball club in the city, having won the Turkish Men's Volleyball League and the Turkish Cup several times, and the CEV Challenge Cup in the 2008–09 season. İzmir Atatürk Volleyball Hall regularly hosts the games of the city's volleyball teams.

The city boasts of several sports legends, past and present. Already at the dawn of its history, notable natives such as the son of its first port's founder Pelops had attained fame and kingdom with a chariot race and Onomastus is one of history's first recorded sportspeople, having won the boxing contest in the Olympiad of 688 BC.

Born in İzmir, and nicknamed Taçsız Kral (The Uncrowned King), 1960s football star Metin Oktay is a legend in Turkey. Oktay became the first notable Turkish footballer to play abroad, with Palermo in Italy's Serie A, during the 1961–1962 season. Two other notable football figures from İzmir are Alpay Özalan and Mustafa Denizli, the first having played for Aston Villa F.C. between 2000 and 2003 and the second, after a long playing career as the captain of İzmir's Altay S.K., still pursues a successful career as a coach, being the only manager in Turkish Super League history to win a championship title with each of Istanbul's "Big Three" clubs (Galatasaray, Fenerbahçe S.K., and Beşiktaş J.K.) and having guided the Turkish national football team to the UEFA Euro 2000 Quarter-Finals.

İzmir Metropolitan Municipality (İBB) Sports Club's ice hockey team began playing in the Turkish Ice Hockey Super League during the 2011–2012 season

== Government ==
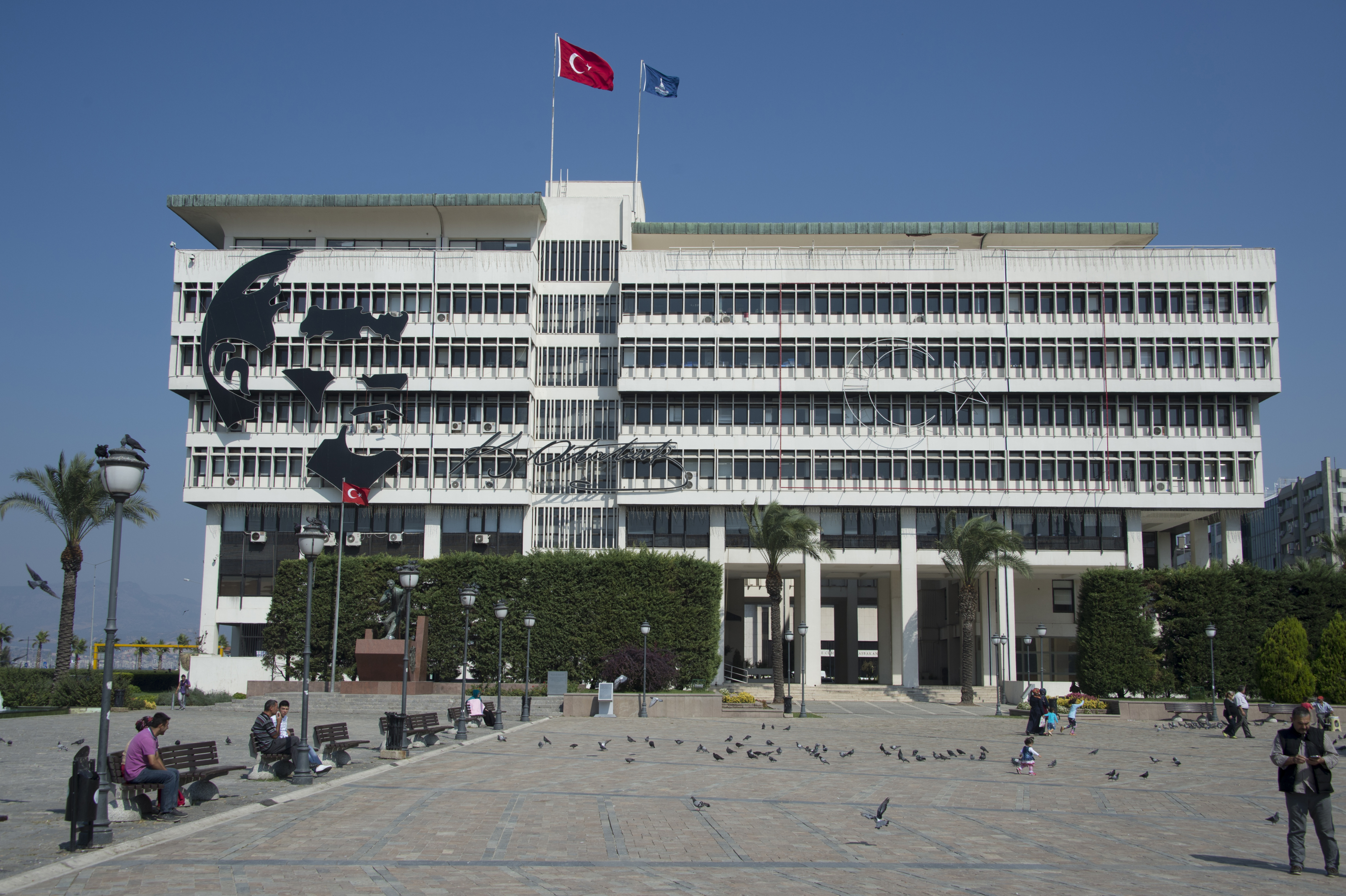
The İzmir Municipal Palace is located at Konak, the city centre.

The İzmir Metropolitan Municipality is the primary local government authority responsible for utilizing public services throughout the province. Constituted as a mayor-council government, the body consists of a mayor and 184 councillors at the Municipal Council of İzmir, who are elected for a five-year term.

In addition, İzmir is divided into 30 districts, each served by independent local authorities that provide a similar variety of services within their jurisdiction, yet they possess no authority over critical infrastructure, such as the public transportation and water supply. District municipalities often collaborate with each other and enjoy the expertise of the metropolitan government.

The local government in İzmir partakes in the establishment of numerous organizations in an attempt to enrich the city's cultural heritage. The İzmir Mediterranean Academy, which seeks to promote the adjacent cultures and encourage the academic research of the Mediterranean studies, and the İzmir Planning Agency, a government institution to prepare the city for "İzmir Vision 2074" are among the recently founded bodies.

Historically, İzmir has been considered the stronghold of the social democrats ─ the city is ruled by the left since the 1980s, albeit under different political parties. Following the rise of the Republican People's Party in 2004 local elections, the main opposition is in government to this day. It is one of the few cities that have never elected Recep Tayyip Erdoğan.

The central government tends to neglect the city, resulting in the disruption of public services. For instance, in 2025, the incumbent government allocated a symbolic 3000 Turkish lira (ca. $84 at early 2025 rate) in funds for a metro project that has been idling for 15 years, while a religious centre in the city received 236 million Turkish lira (ca. $6.5 million). Meanwhile, in contrast to Turkey's ruling Justice and Development Party platform in the rest of the country, conservative competitors in Izmir avoid the use of the political party logo, and pledge not to "interfere with the lifestyles".

== Media ==
İzmir has its own local media companies: there are 9 TV channels headquartered in İzmir and broadcasting in the Aegean Region, 26 local radio stations and 15 local newspapers. TRT Belgesel (TRT Documentary) is a Turkish national TV channel broadcasting from the TRT building in İzmir.

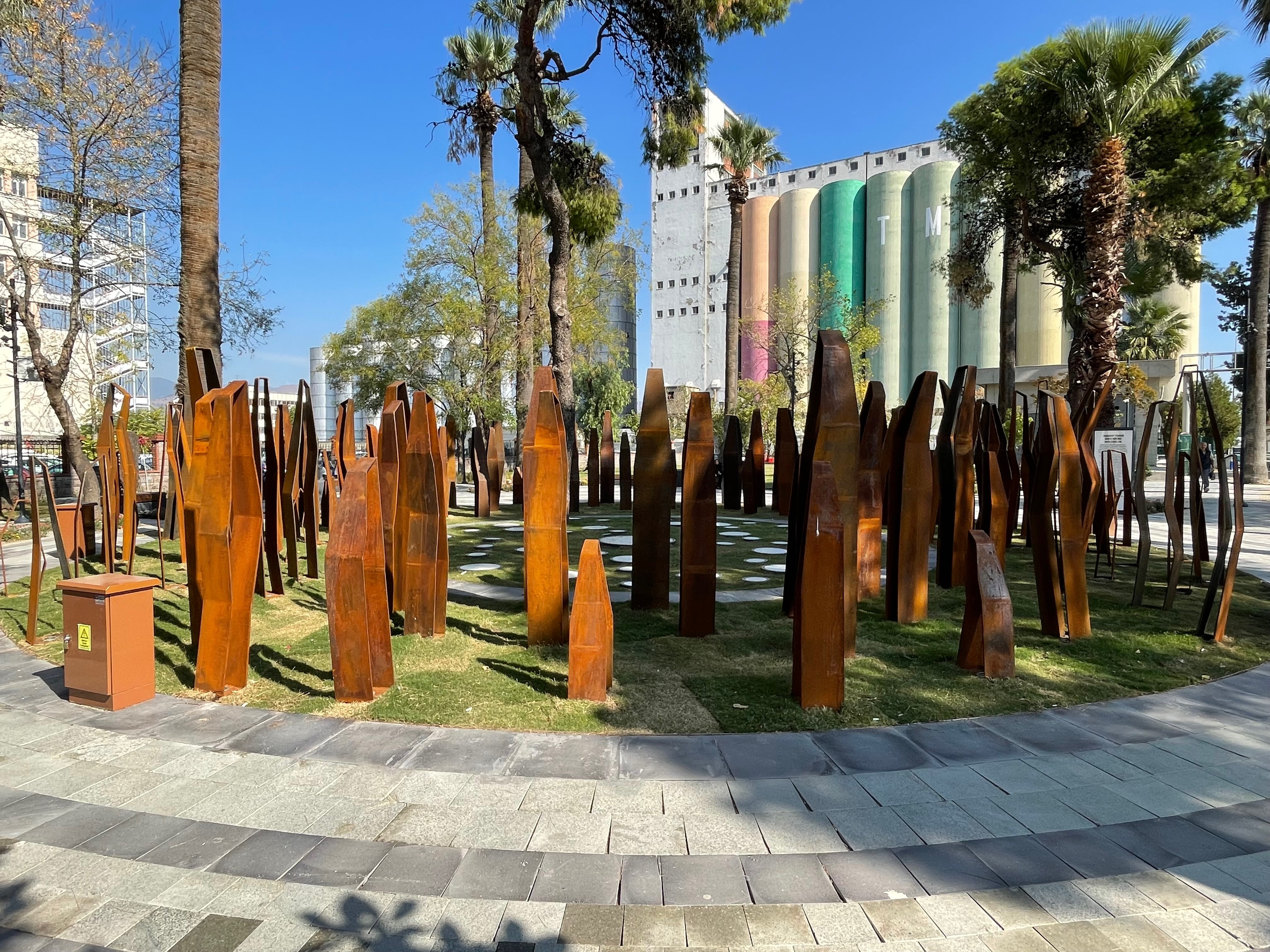
Circle of Life Memorial

=== İzmir in notable literary and artistic works ===
- The play L'impresario delle Smirne by Carlo Goldoni (1759).
- The poem "The Turkish Captive" in the poetry volume Les Orientales by Victor Hugo (1828).
- The solo piano piece "In Smyrna" by Edward Elgar (1905).
- The novel Mask of Dimitrios, Eric Ambler (1939)
- The film You Can't Win 'Em All, directed by Leo Gordon and starring Tony Curtis and Charles Bronson (1970).
- The travel book Scotch and Holy Water, John D. Tumpane (1981)
- The novel Farewell Anatolia, Dido Sotiriou (1962)
- The novel İzmir, E. Howard Hunt (2006)
- The novel Middlesex, Jeffrey Eugenides (2002)
- The novel/TV series The Witches of Smyrna by Mara Meimaridi (2004).
- The novel Birds Without Wings, Louis de Bernières (2005)

== Health ==
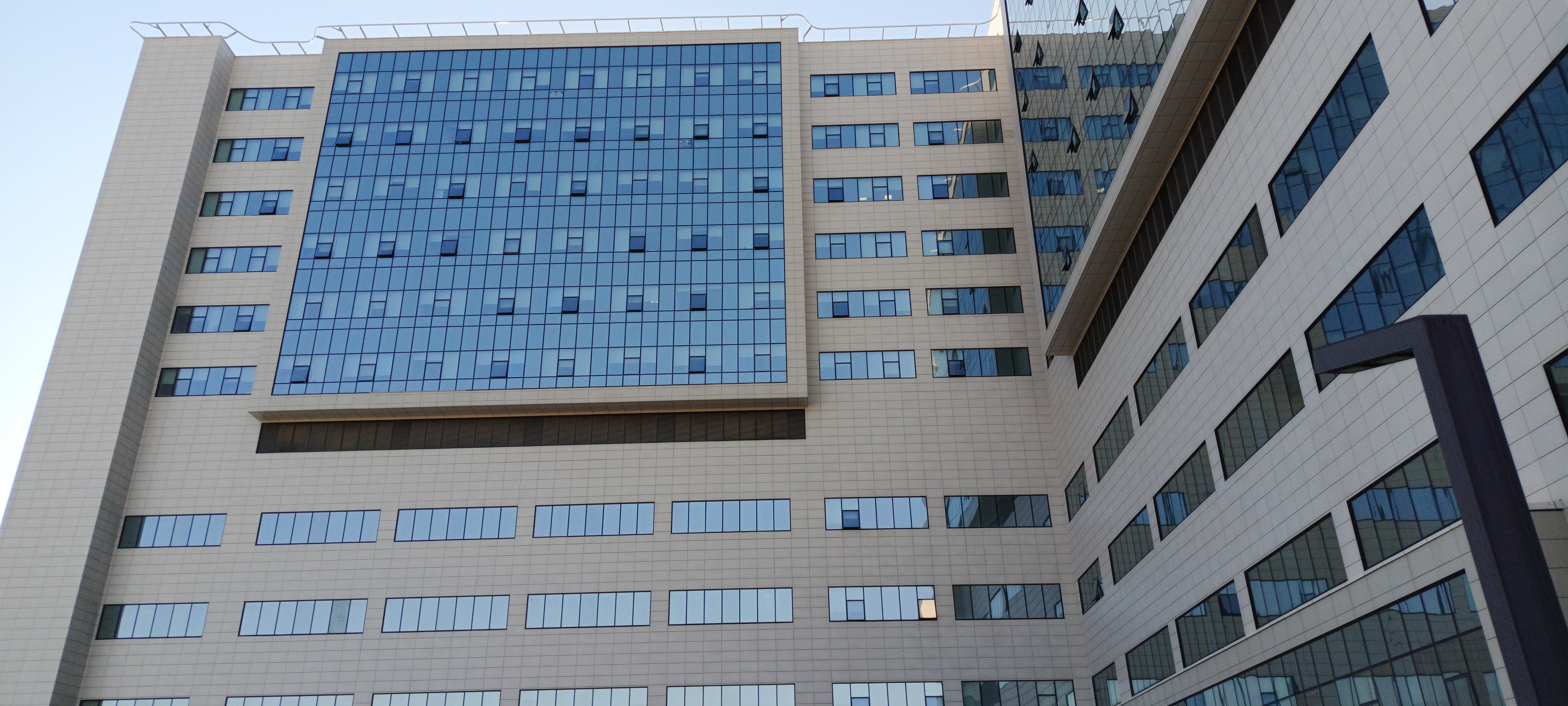
İzmir City Hospital

Air pollution in Turkey is a problem in the city, in part due to vehicle exhaust: a 2020 study of coal-fired residential heating estimated the cost of replacing it versus the reduction in illness and premature death. There are 21 public hospitals in İzmir. The healthcare system in Turkey consists of a mix of public and private hospitals. Turkey also has a universal health care insurance system (SGK) which provides medical treatment free of charge in public hospitals to residents registered with a Turkish identity card number. One of the largest hospitals in the Aegean Region, Izmir City Hospital is situated in the Bayraklı district of İzmir, constructed with a reported cost of 780 million Euros.

Eşrefpaşa Hospital serves as the only existing municipal hospital in Turkey, owned and operated by Izmir Metropolitan Municipality.

== Education ==
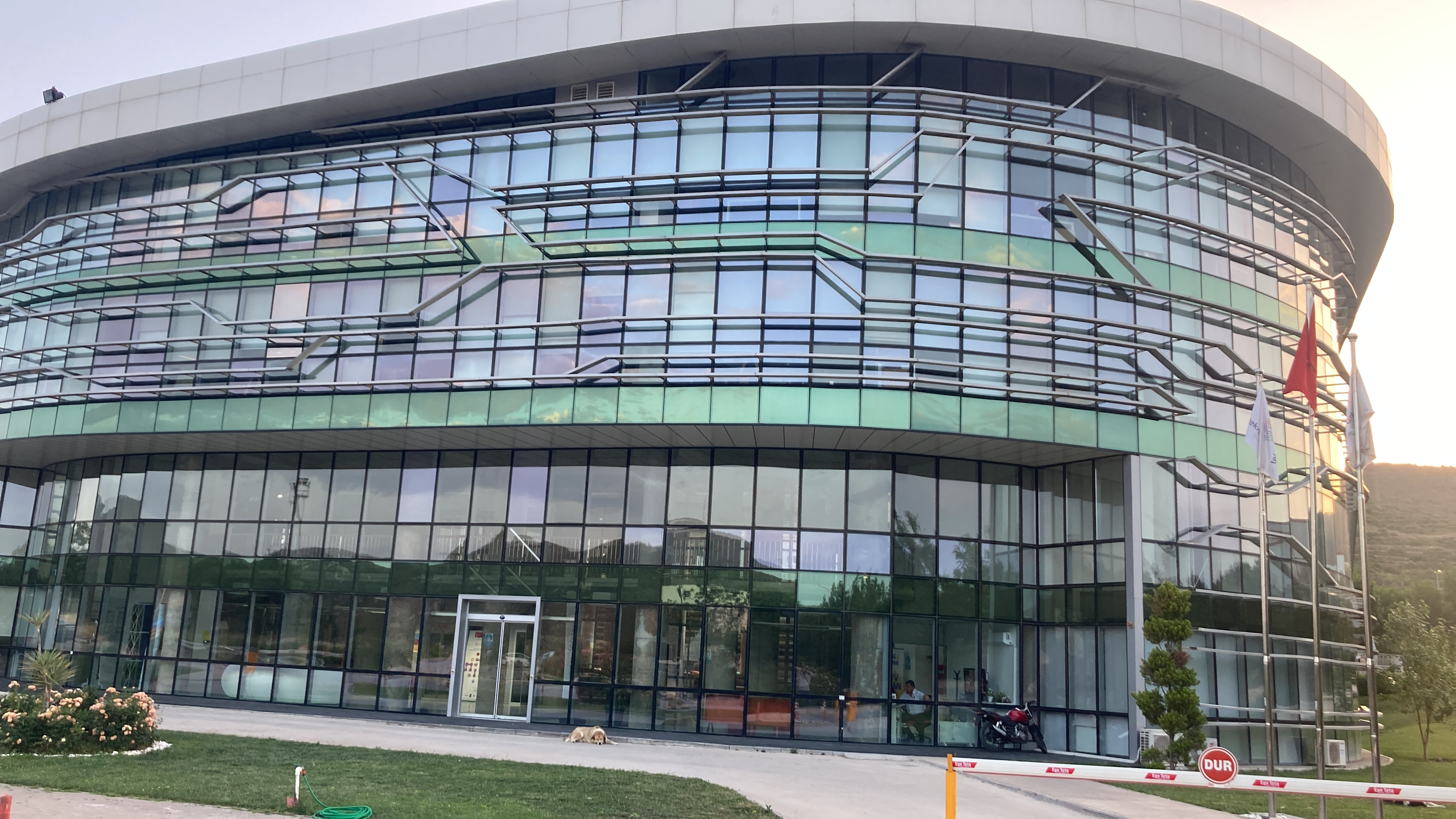
İzmir Institute of Technology

Historically, the education network in İzmir consisted of vocation-oriented national schools, and minority colleges that taught in foreign languages. There was no modern higher education institution until the founding of the Ionian University by the occupation forces in 1920. It was organized by the Greek mathematician and close friend of Albert Einstein, Constantin Carathéodory, on the instructions of the Greek government. However, it never operated due to the Greek defeat in the Greco-Turkish War. The novel Republic did not establish any counterpart as the government centered the resources on bolstering the educational infrastructure in Ankara, the new capital under construction. Established in 1944, the İzmir Higher Economy and Trade School was the first operational university. It was later converted to a social sciences school prior to its eventual merger with the Dokuz Eylül University.

=== Public universities ===
The Ege University was founded by the Turkish government in 1955. To this day, it remains the largest and the most influential university in İzmir. The subsequent Dokuz Eylül University is an alternative prominent generalist school.

Another government initiative, the İzmir Institute of Technology, albeit not located within the urban sprawl, is considered a compelling university in terms of research opportunities. Offering a scant variety of science degrees, it is the only university in the city where all programmes are taught in English.

- Ege University
- Dokuz Eylül University
- İzmir Institute of Technology
- İzmir Kâtip Çelebi University
- İzmir Bakırçay University
- İzmir Democracy University

=== Private universities ===
- İzmir University of Economics
- Yaşar University
- İzmir Tınaztepe University

There are a total of nine active universities in and near İzmir. The city is also home to well-rooted higher-education establishments that are renowned across Turkey, such as the İzmir Anatolian Vocational High School of Commerce (İzmir Anadolu Ticaret Lisesi) established in 1854, and the American Collegiate Institute (ACI) which was established in 1878.

Historically, during the late 19th and early 20th centuries, the city was an educational center of the Greek world, with a total of 67 male and 4 female schools. The most important Greek educational institution was the Evangelical School which operated from 1733 to 1922.

İzmir is also home to the third U.S. Space Camp in the world, Space Camp Turkey.

Gediz University, Izmir University and Şifa University were former private universities in the city, which were closed down as a result of 2016 Turkish coup attempt on the grounds that they were linked to the FETÖ. The universities' facilities were subsequently transferred to the government. Former main campus of Gediz University serves as the main campus of Bakırçay University, whereas campuses of Izmir University forms the initial campuses of Democracy University.

=== International schools in İzmir ===
- Deutsche Schule Izmir (German school)
- Scuola Primaria e dell'Infanzia Italiana di Smirne (Italian school)

== Transport ==
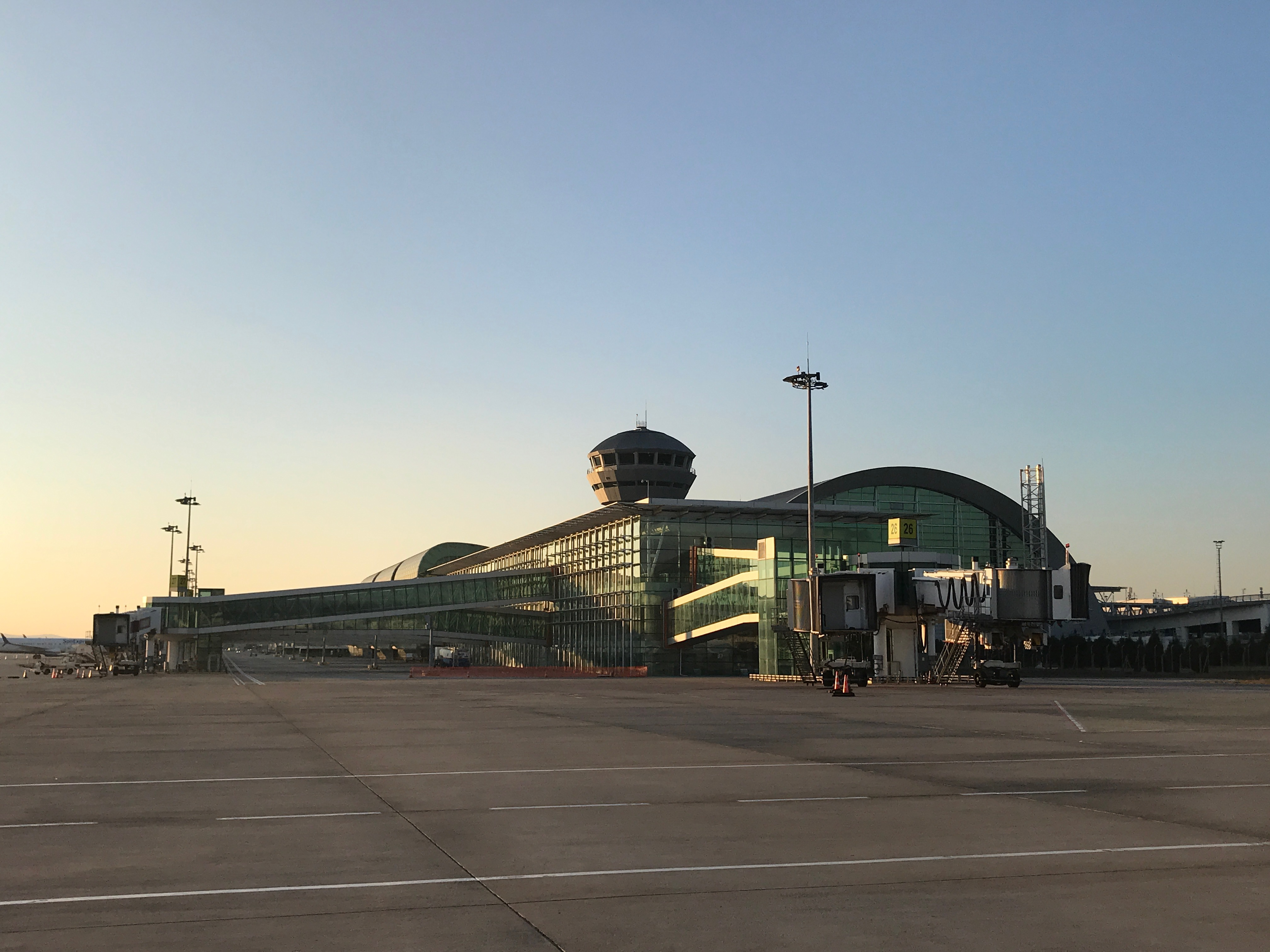
Adnan Menderes International Airport is the main airport in İzmir.

İzmir is served by domestic and international flights through the Adnan Menderes International Airport and by modern rapid transit systems serving the entirety of İzmir's metropolitan area. The city has attracted investors through its strategic location and its relatively new and highly developed technological infrastructure in transportation, telecommunications, and energy.

=== Inter-city transport ===
==== Air ====
The Adnan Menderes International Airport (ADB) is well served with connections to Turkish and international destinations. It is located in the Gaziemir district of İzmir.

==== Bus ====
A large bus terminal, the Otogar in the Pınarbaşı neighborhood of the city, has intercity buses to destinations across Turkey. Bus companies' shuttle services pick up customers from each of their branch offices scattered across the city at regular intervals, often free of charge. To facilitate easier access, a Halkapınar—Otogar metro line has long been deliberated but construction has never begun – though throughout his campaign and upon his election as mayor of İzmir in 2019, Tunç Soyer has outlined it as one of his priorities.

==== Rail ====
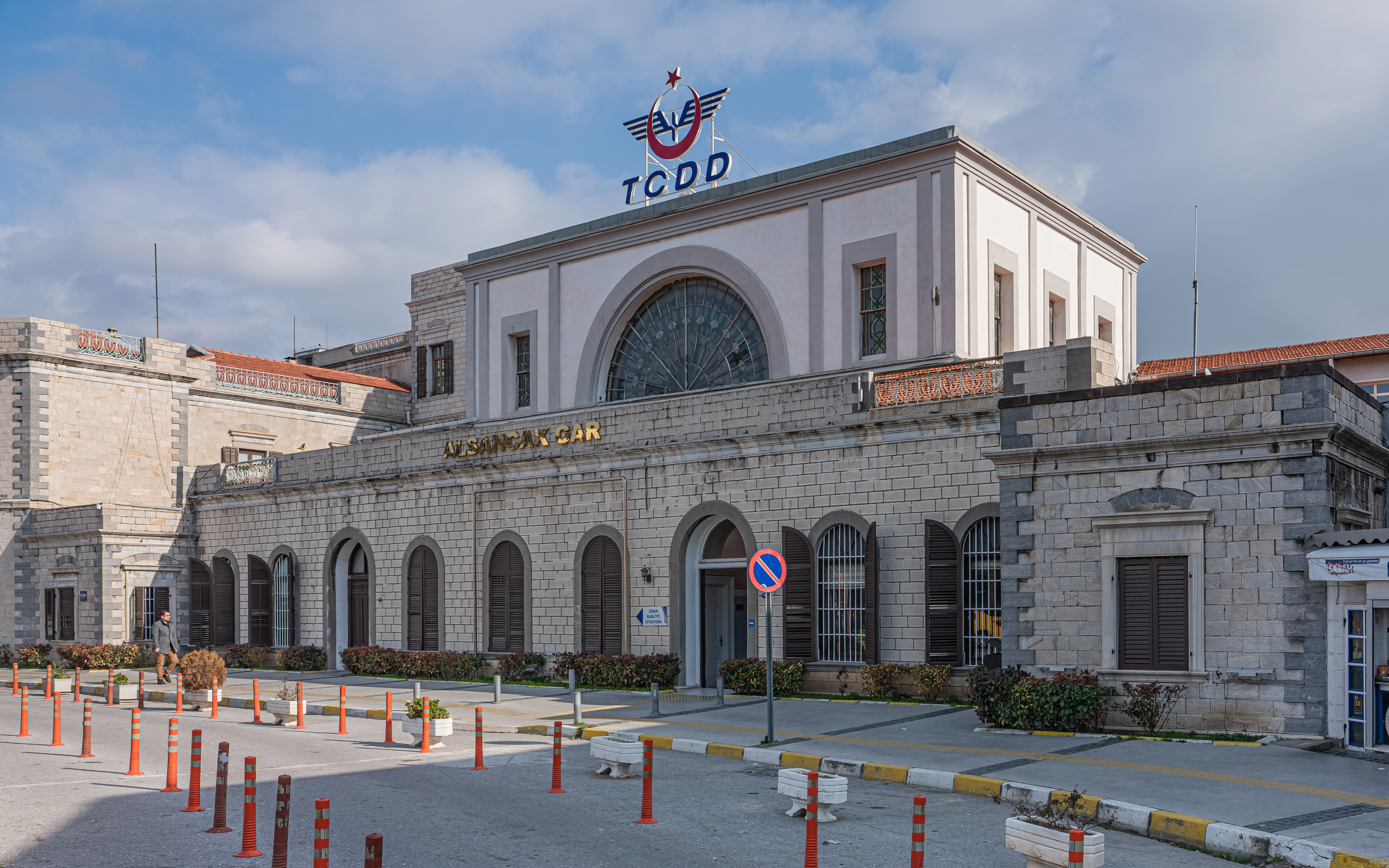
Alsancak railway station (1858) in İzmir was opened as the terminus of the İzmir–Aydın line, the oldest railway line in Turkey and the second-oldest railway line in the Ottoman Empire after the Cairo–Alexandria line (1856) in the Ottoman Eyalet of Egypt.

İzmir has two historical rail terminals in the city centre. Alsancak Terminal, built in 1858, and Basmane Terminal, built in 1866, are the two main railway stations of the city. The Turkish State Railways operates regional service to Ödemiş, Tire, Selçuk, Aydın, Söke, Nazilli, Denizli and Uşak, as well as longer-distance intercity service to Ankara, Afyon and Bandırma (and from there to Istanbul via İDO connection).

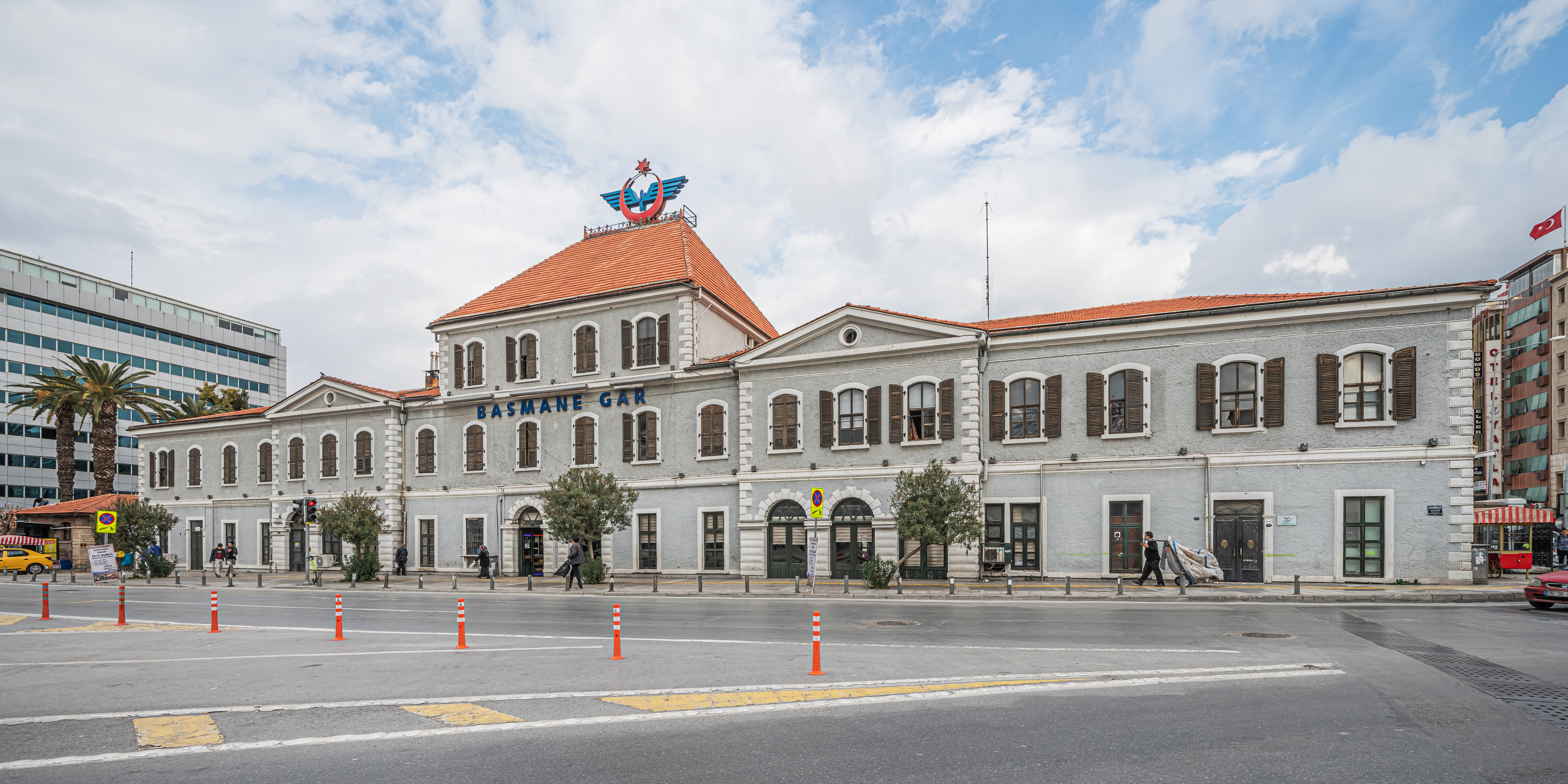
Basmane railway station (1866)

=== Inner-city transport ===
Coordinated public transportation was introduced to İzmir in 1999. A body known as UKOME gives strategic direction to the Metro, the ESHOT bus division, ferry operations, utilities and road developments. İzmir has an electronic, integrated pre-pay ticket known as the İzmirim Kart ('My İzmir' Card). The card is valid on all metro and commuter rail lines, buses, ferries, trams, and in certain other municipal facilities. The İzmirim Kart allows for the use of multiple forms of transport within a 120-minute window, combining for a single fare price.

==== Bus ====
All of İzmir's major districts are serviced by a dense, comprehensive municipal bus network under the name ESHOT. The acronym stands for "E elektrik (electricity); S su (water); H havagazı (gas); O otobüs (bus) and T troleybüs (trolleybus)." Electricity, water and gas are now supplied by separate undertakings, and İzmir's trolleybus system ceased to operate in 1992. However, the bus operations, the O of the acronym ESHOT, has retained the original name. ESHOT operates 322 lines with about 1,500 buses and a staff of 2,700. It has five garages at Çakalburnu, Çiğli, Adatepe, Aktepe, and Mersinli. A privately owned company, İzulaş, operates 400 buses from two garages, running services under contract for ESHOT. These scheduled services are supplemented by the privately owned minibus or dolmuş services.

==== Urban ferries ====
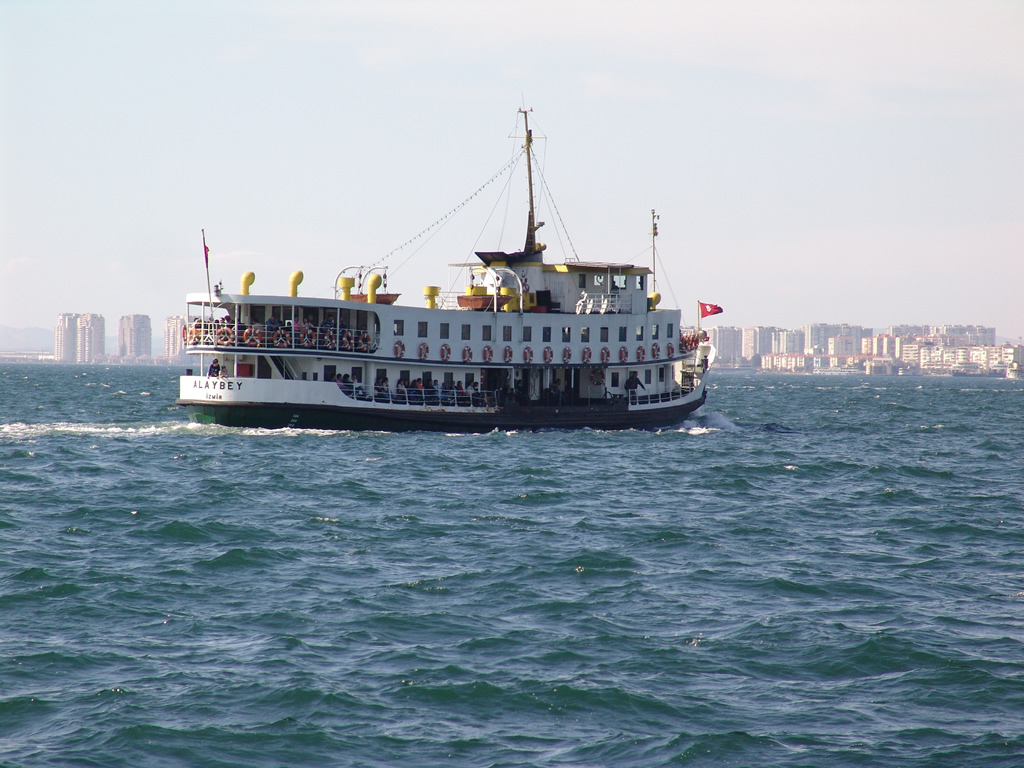
İzmir Municipality's urban ferry services in the Gulf of İzmir

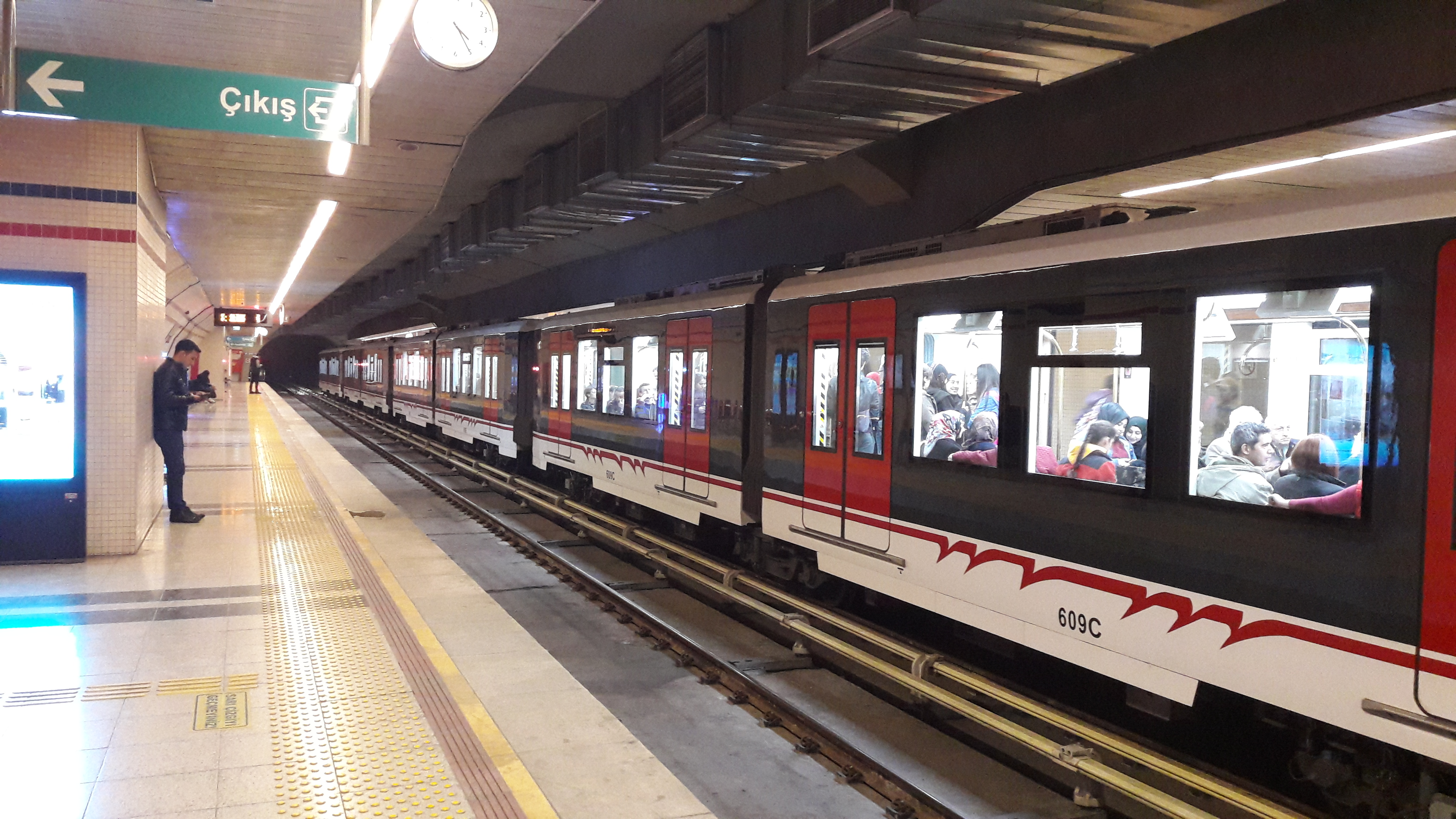
İzmir Metro has around 293 thousand daily passengers.

Taken over by İzmir Metropolitan Municipality since 2000 and operated within the structure of their private subsidiary company (İzdeniz), İzmir's urban ferry services for passengers and vehicles are very much a part of the life of the city's inhabitants. 24 ferries shuttle between 9 quays (clockwise: Bostanlı, Karşıyaka, Alsancak, Pasaport, Konak, Karantina, Göztepe and Üçkuyular.) Special lines to points further out in the gulf are also put in service during summer, transporting excursion or holiday makers. These services are cheap and it is not unusual to see natives or visitors taking a ferry ride simply as a pastime.

=== Metro ===
The metro in İzmir is operated by a municipally owned corporation that subordinates to the Izmir Metropolitan Municipality. It consists of one line, M1, as the rest of the urban sprawl is served by commuter rail and tram. Starting from Kaymakamlık station on the west end of the city, the line expands in between the city centre and provides coverage until Evka 3 in Bornova. The 27-kilometres long M1 carries over 293 thousand passengers on a daily basis.

Over the years, the hike in population and congestion caused the authorities to seek numerous additions to the network. As of 2025, M2, encompassing over Konak and Buca is still under construction and is expected to be introduced to service by 2027. M3, M4, and M5 are among the planned lines.

==== Regional rail ====
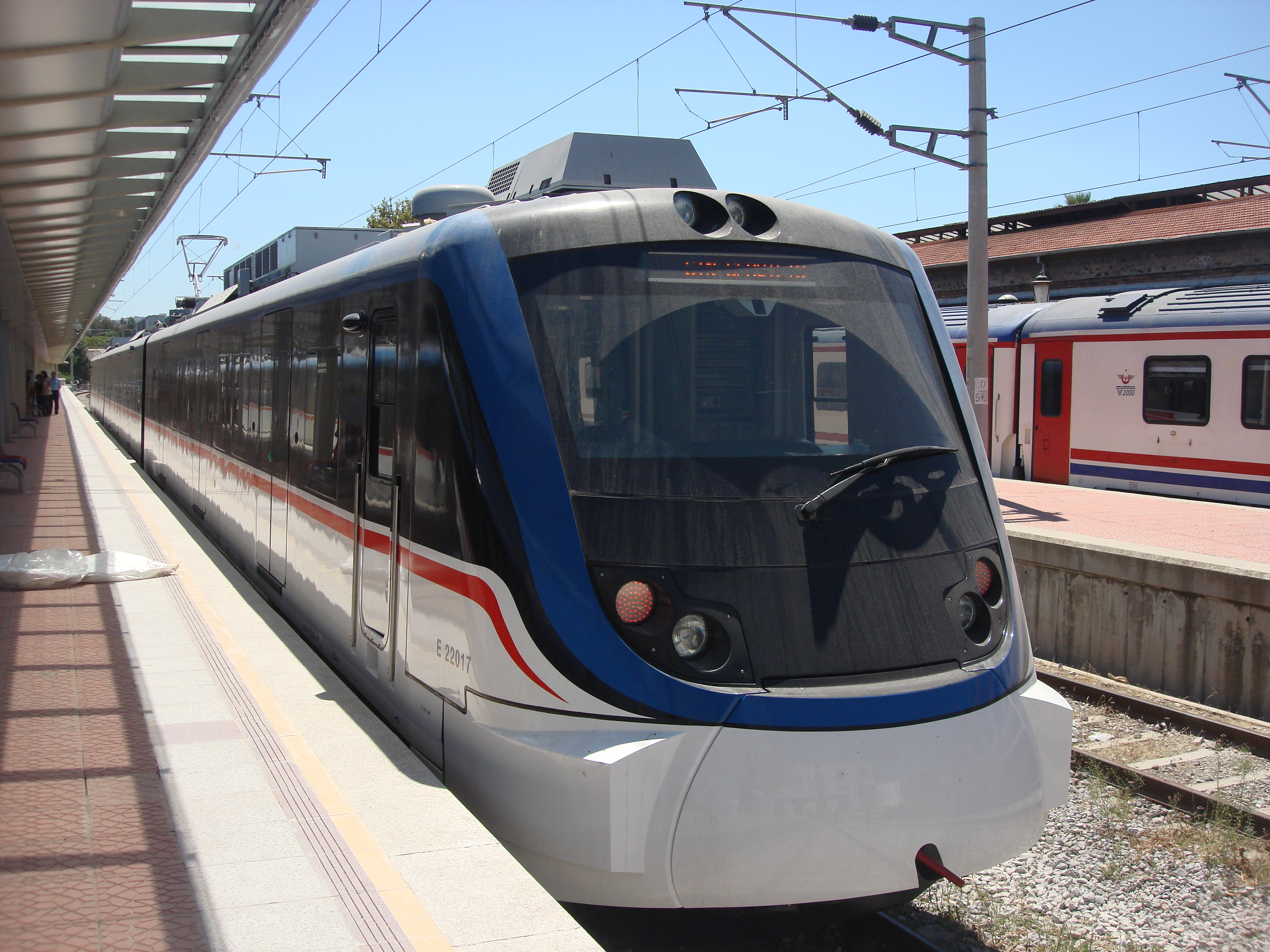
İZBAN commuter train

İZBAN, formerly known as Egeray, is a commuter rail system connecting metropolitan and suburban area of İzmir. It is the busiest commuter railway in Turkey, serving about 150,000 passengers daily. İZBAN is a portmanteau of the words "İzmir" and "Banliyö".

Established in 2006, İZBAN was formed to revive commuter rail in İzmir. İZBAN began operations in 2010 and currently operates a 136 km (85 mi) long system with 41 stations.

İZBAN A.Ş. operates the railway and is owned 50% by the Turkish State Railways and 50% by the İzmir Metropolitan Municipality.

==== Tram ====
İzmir's latest tram system is owned by the metropolitan municipality and operated by İzmir Metro A.Ş. in three independent lines – one in Karşıyaka, opened in 2017, one in Konak, opened in 2018, and one in Çiğli, opened in 2024.

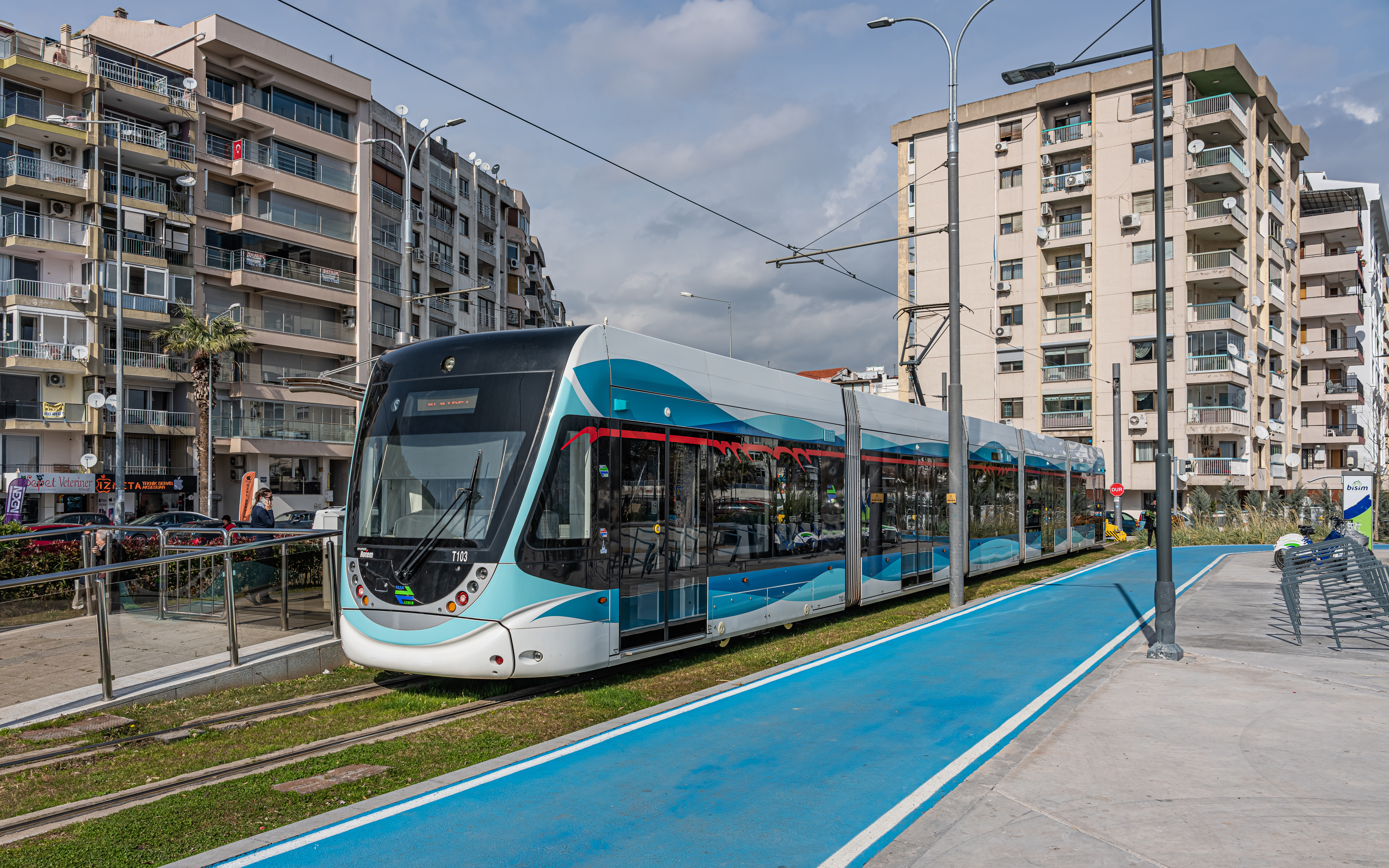
A Karşıyaka Tram at Alaybey

==== Public transportation statistics ====
The average amount of time people spend commuting with public transit in İzmir, for example to and from work on a weekday is 62 minutes, and 13% of public transit riders ride for more than 2 hours every day. The average amount of time people wait at a stop or station for public transit is 15 minutes, while 27% of riders wait for over 20 minutes on average every day. The average distance people usually ride in a single trip with public transit is 10.4 km, while 22% travel for over 12 km in a single direction.

== Twin towns and sister cities ==
The following is a list of İzmir's sister cities:

=== Europe ===
- Aarhus, Denmark, since 1991
- Ancona, Italy, (Cooperation Agreement) since 2005
- Bălți, Moldova, since 1996
- Bremen, Germany, since 1993
- Constanța, Romania, since 1995
- Famagusta, Cyprus / Northern Cyprus (Note: Disputed territory between Cyprus and the self-declared state of Northern Cyprus)
- Kardzhali, Bulgaria, since 2008
- Mostar, Bosnia and Herzegovina, since 1996
- North Nicosia, Cyprus / Northern Cyprus, since 2019
- Plzeň, Czech Republic, since 1987
- Sarajevo, Bosnia and Herzegovina, since 2022
- Split, Croatia, since 1996
- Turin, Italy, (Goodwill Agreement) since 2012
- Volgograd, Russia, since 2006

=== Asia ===
- Baku, Azerbaijan, since 1985
- Bishkek, Kyrgyzstan, since 1991
- Mumbai, India, since 1997
- Shymkent, Kazakhstan (Cooperation Agreement) since 2004
- Bukhara, Uzbekistan (Cooperation Agreement) since 1992
- Tel Aviv, Israel, since 1996
- Tianjin, China, since 1990
- Türkmenabat, Turkmenistan, since 1994
- Wuhan, Hubei, China, since 2013
- Xiamen, Fujian, China, since 2018

=== Africa ===
- Sousse, Tunisia, since 2006
- Cape Town, South Africa, (Cooperation Agreement) since 2014

=== Americas ===
- Cali, Colombia, since 2018
- Havana, Cuba, since 1996
- Long Beach, California, United States, since 2004
- São Paulo, Brazil, since 2007
- Tampa, Florida, United States, since 1990
- Esparza (canton), Puntarenas, Costa Rica, since 2024

== See also ==
- Pasaport Terminal
- List of people from İzmir
- List of museums in İzmir
- List of parks in İzmir
- List of hospitals in İzmir Province
- List of mayors of İzmir
- List of Ottoman mosques in İzmir
- Yeni Kavaflar Market
