= List of museums in İzmir =

Izmir Museums

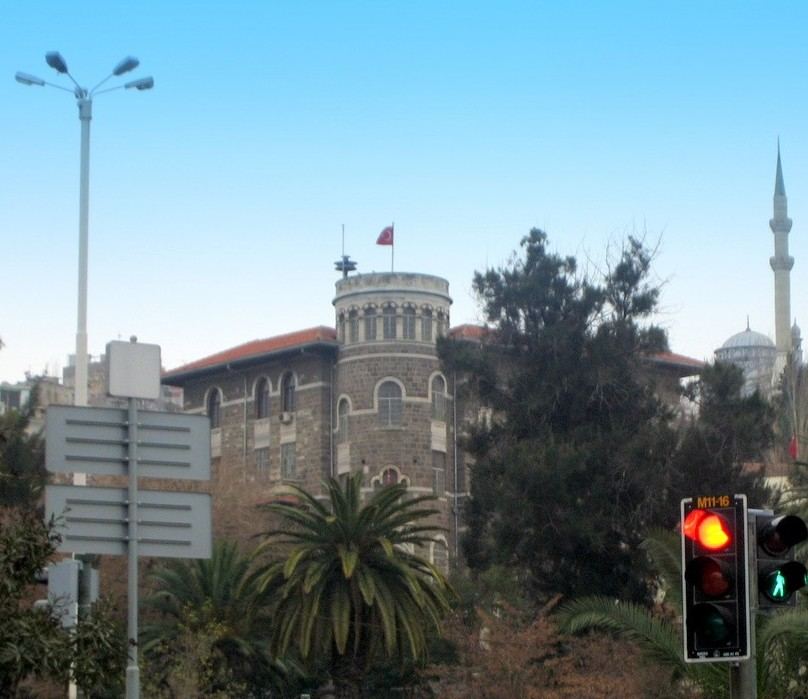
İzmir Ethnography Museum

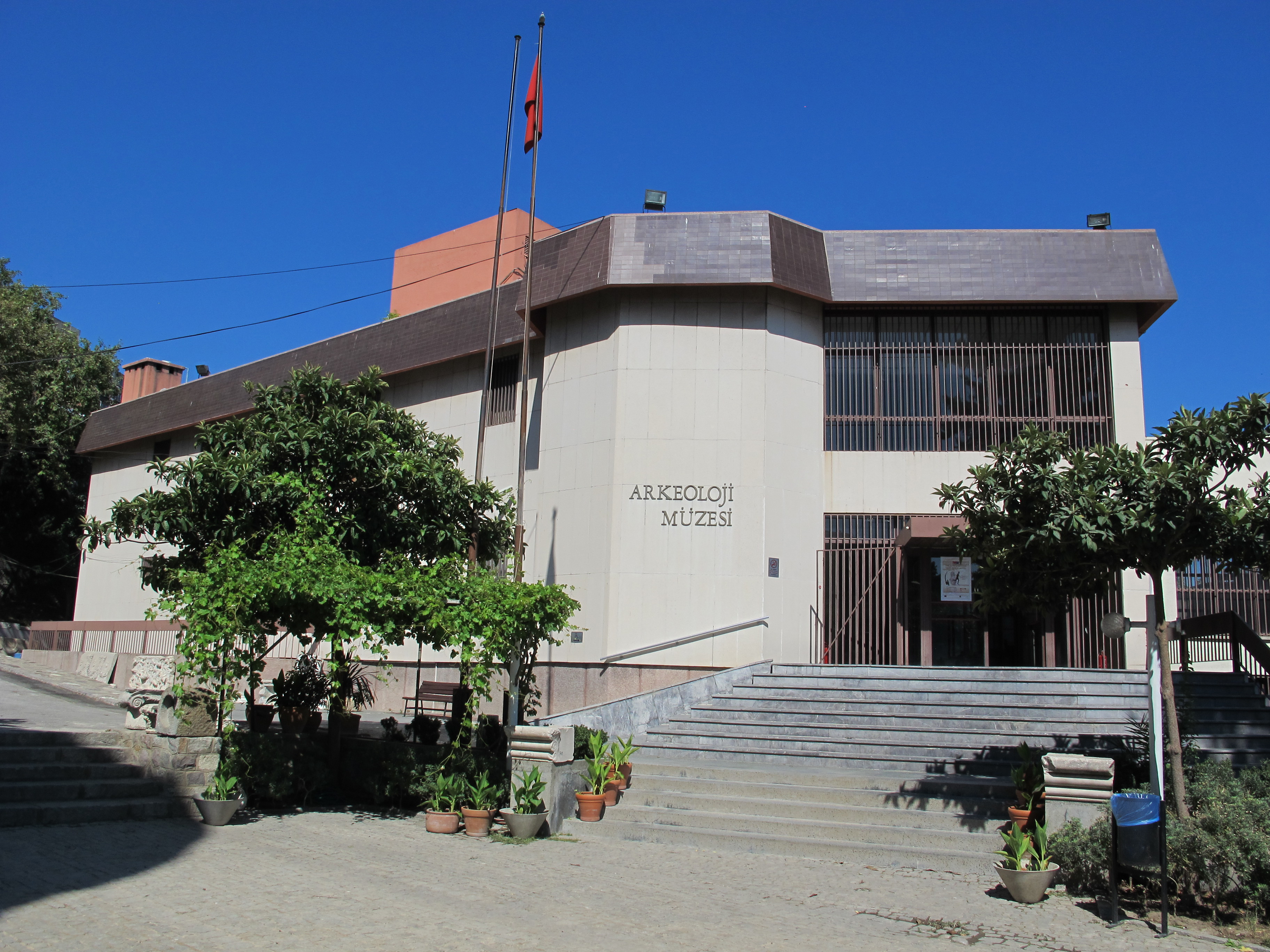
İzmir Archaeology Museum

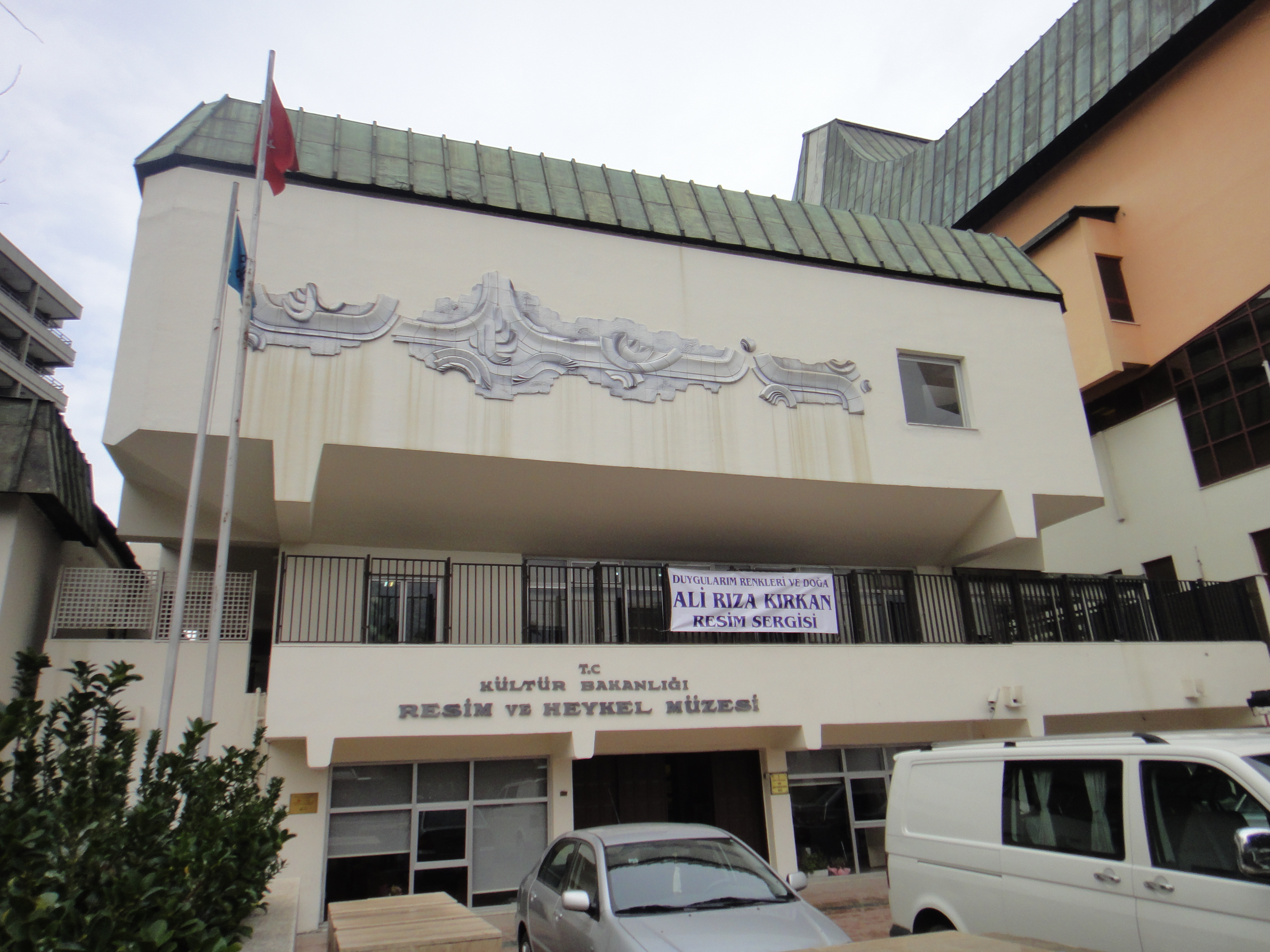
İzmir Art and Sculpture Museum

Below is a list of museums in İzmir, Turkey, indicated with the neighborhood and the district where each is located.

== Art museums ==
- İzmir Art and Sculpture Museum
- Selçuk Yaşar Museum of Arts, Alsancak, Konak

== Cultural and historical museums ==
- İzmir Archeology Museum, Bahribaba Park, Konak
- İzmir Ethnography Museum, Bahribaba Park, Konak
- İzmir Museum of History and Art, Kültürpark, Konak
- Ahmet Priştina Museum of Metropolitan History, Çankaya, Konak
- İzmir Museum of Commercial History, İzmir Chamber of Commerce Building, Alsancak, Konak
- Agora Open Air Museum of İzmir, Agora of Smyrna, Konak
- Bostanlı Open-air Archaeological Museum

== Memorial museums and commemorative collections ==
- İzmir Atatürk Museum, Alsancak, Konak

== Military museums ==
- İnciralti Sea Museum, İnciraltı, Balçova

== Technical and natural-history museums ==
- İzmir Railroad Museum, Alsancak, Konak

== Other ==
- İzmir Toy Museum
- İzmir Women's Museum

== See also ==
- List of museums in Turkey
