= List of hospitals in İzmir Province =

This is a list of hospitals in İzmir Province, Turkey.

== State hospitals ==
- Aliağa Devlet Hastanesi, Aliağa
- Bayındır Devlet Hastanesi, Bayındır
- Bergama Dr. Faruk İlker Devlet Hastanesi, Bergama
- Bornova Türkan Özilhan Devlet Hastanesi, Bornova
- Çeşme Alper Çizgenakat Devlet Hastanesi, Çeşme
- Dikili Devlet Hastanesi, Dikili
- Dr. Behçet Uz Çocuk Hastanesi, Alsancak
- İzmir City Hospital, Bayraklı
- Eşrefpaşa Hastanesi, Yenişehir, Konak
- Foça Devlet Hastanesi, Foça
- İzmir Eğitim Diş Hastanesi, Konak
- Kemalpaşa Devlet Hastanesi, Kemalpaşa
- Kiraz Devlet Hastanesi, Kiraz
- Menemen Devlet Hastanesi, Menemen
- Nevvar - Salih İşgören Alsancak Devlet Hastanesi, Alsancak, Konak
- Ödemiş Devlet Hastanesi, Ödemiş
- Seferihisar Necat Hepkon Devlet Hastanesi, Seferihisar
- Selçuk Devlet Hastanesi, Selçuk
- Tire Devlet Hastanesi, Tire
- Torbalı Devlet Hastanesi, Torbalı
- Urla Devlet Hastanesi, Urla

== Maternity hospitals ==
- Ege Üniversitesi Tıp Fakültesi Doğumevi, Bornova
- Tepecik Doğum Hastanesi, Yenişehir, Konak
- Buca Doğumevi ve Çocuk Hastalıkları Hastanesi, Buca
- Özel Çınarlı Kadın Doğum Hastanesi, Konak

== Teaching/university hospitals ==
=== Public ===
- Dokuz Eylül Üniversitesi Tıp Fakültesi Hastanesi, İnciraltı, Balçova
- Ege Üniversitesi Tıp Fakültesi Hastanesi, Bornova
- Tepecik Eğitim ve Araştırma Hastanesi, Yenişehir, Konak
- Dr. Suat Seren Göğüs Hastalıkları Eğitim ve Araştırma Hastanesi, Yenişehir, Konak
- İzmir Atatürk Eğitim ve Araştırma Hastanesi, Yeşilyurt, Konak
- Çiğli Eğitim ve Araştırma Hastanesi, Çiğli
- Buca Seyfi Demirsoy Eğitim ve Araştırma Hastanesi, Buca

=== Private ===
- Başkent Üniversitesi Zübeyde Hanım Hastanesi, Bostanlı, Karşıyaka
- İzmir Tınaztepe Üniversitesi Özel Buca Hastanesi, Buca
- İzmir Tınaztepe Üniversitesi Özel Galen Hastanesi, Buca
- İzmir Ekonomi Üniversitesi Özel Medical Point Hastanesi, Karşıyaka

== Private hospitals ==
- Özel Akut Kalp Damar Hastanesi, Gaziemir
- Özel Atakalp Hastanesi, Konak
- Özel Baki Uzun Hastanesi, Karabağlar
- BatıAnadolu Central Hospital, Bayraklı
- Ekol Kulak Burun Boğaz Hastanesi, Çiğli
- Özel Deniz Hastanesi, Yenişehir, Konak
- Özel Diabet Hastanesi, Yenişehir, Konak
- Özel Ege Sağlık Hastanesi, Alsancak, Konak
- Özel Egepol Hastanesi, Karabağlar
- Özel El Ve Mikrocerrahi Hastanesi, Alsancak, Konak
- Özel Gazi Hastanesi, Alsancak, Konak
- Özel Gözde Hastanesi, Yenişehir, Konak
- Özel Hayat Hastanesi, Konak
- Özel İzmir Hastanesi, Konak
- Özel Karataş Hastanesi, Karataş, Konak
- Özel Kaşkaloğlu Göz Hastanesi Alsancak, Konak
- Özel Kent Hastanesi, Çiğli
- Medical Park İzmir Hastanesi, Karşıyaka
- Özel Medifema Hastanesi, Torbalı
- Özel Su Hastanesi, Kahramanlar, Konak
- Özel Tınaztepe Torbalı Hastanesi, Torbalı
- Dentleon Hospital, Bornova

== Former hospitals ==
=== Public ===
- D.D.Y. Hastanesi, Alsancak, Konak
- Dr. E.Hayri Üstündağ Kadın Hastalıkları ve Doğum Hastanesi, Konak
- Karşıyaka Devlet Hastanesi, Serinkuyu, Karşıyaka
- Bozyaka Eğitim ve Araştırma Hastanesi, Bozyaka, Konak

=== Military ===
- Güzelyalı Hava Hastanesi, Üçkuyular, Konak
- İzmir Mevki Asker Hastanesi, Hatay, Konak (currently part of İzmir Atatürk Eğitim ve Araştırma Hastanesi)
