= Women's Museum Istanbul =

- İstanbul Kadın Müzesi
- Established: 2012; 14 years ago
- Type: Virtual museum, women's museum
- Curator: Meral Akkent
- Website: istanbulkadinmuzesi.org/en

Women's Museum Istanbul (Turkish: İstanbul Kadın Müzesi), located in Istanbul, Turkey, is an online museum devoted to the role played by women in the city. Launched online in 2012, the museum is Turkey's first-ever and the world's third city museum dedicated to women. The permanent exhibition of the Women's Museum Istanbul presents the biographies of women who chose a different lifestyle than that which was expected in their times. Short texts accompanying the installations in the permanent exhibition illustrate the social, cultural, economic and political dynamics of each life.

== History ==
The Women's Museum Istanbul is an online museum devoted to the role played by women in the city. Launched online in 2012 by the Women´s Culture Foundation İstanbul, the museum is Turkey's first-ever and the world's third city museum dedicated to women. The other women's museum in Turkey is the İzmir Women's Museum, which opened in 2014. The inaugural curator is Meral Akkent.

== Activities ==
The permanent exhibition of the Women's Museum Istanbul presents the biographies of women who chose a different lifestyle than that which was expected in their times. Short texts accompanying the installations in the permanent exhibition illustrate the social, cultural, economic and political dynamics of each life. The museum's other activities include events, an educational programme in schools, and the creation of a research archive. The Herstory Academic Archive is a record of academic studies on Turkish women's history. The museum also launched an annual prize series, the Women's History Research Prizes, which are awarded to the authors of studies on the subject of Turkish women's history.

== Gallery ==
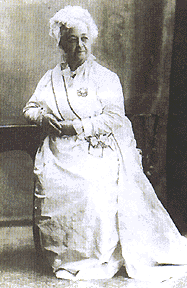
Leyla Saz

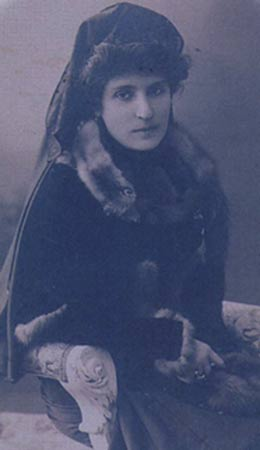
Nigâr Hanım

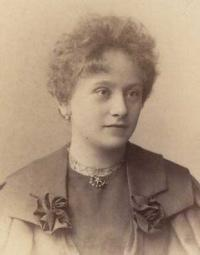
Mihri Müşfik

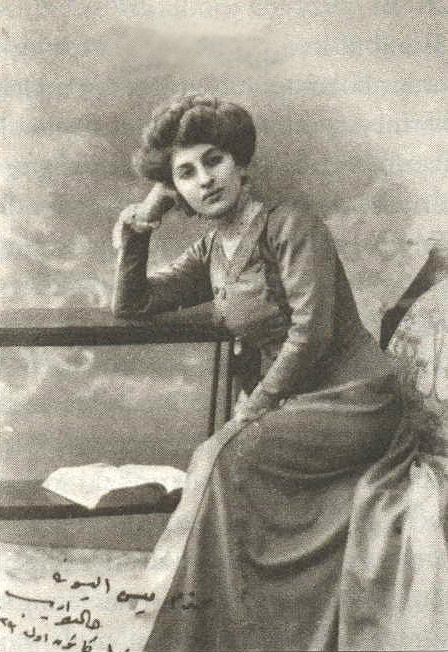
Halide Edip

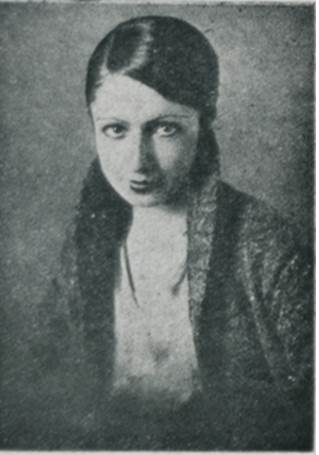
Hale Asaf
