= Barış Youth Symphony Orchestra =

- Youth orchestra
- Native name: Barış Çocuk Senfoni Orkestrası
- Founded: 2015; 10 years ago
- Location: Eşrefpaşa, İzmir, Turkey
- Concert hall: Ahmed Adnan Saygun Arts Center

Barış Youth Symphony Orchestra (Turkish: Barış Çocuk Senfoni Orkestrası, literally: Peace Children Symphony Orchestra) is a youth orchestra founded at İzmir, Turkey in 2015. The orchestra has nearly one hundred members. Various classic music artists have joined the orchestra for its concerts.

== History ==
Turkish soprano Selmin Öney Günöz was inspired by the El Sistema free music education program in Venezuela. She launched the Barış Youth Symphony Orchestra project in 2015 to provide free music education to children with limited opportunities living in troubled neighborhoods in İzmir. The program aims to keep children away from violence, crime, and addiction.

The initial children were provided with 20 violins with the support of volunteers. The first concert took place accompanied by the concert pianist Gülsin Onay. With the concert revenue, more music instruments were purchased, and the number of children in training increased to 60. In 2017, Öney Günöz founded the "Barış Çocuk Orkestrası Koruma ve Geliştirme Derneği" (English: Barış Children's Orchestra Conservation and Development Association) which manages grant money, instrument maintenance, and acquisition of new instruments.

The glass processing company Yorglass began sponsoring the orchestra in 2018, with the orchestra taking name "Yorglass Barış Youth Symphony Orchestra".

As of May 2022, 98 children played in the orchestra's concerts, and around 50 more were enrolled in music education. Most of the applicants to enter the orchestra are girls.

== Orchestra ==
The orchestra has given concerts with musicians including the flutist Ayla Caymaz, the Ümit Bulut Choir, drummer Burhan Öçal, Savaş Özkök, and the young concert pianist Can Çakmur. They have also done concerts with the concert pianist İdil Biret and conductors Howard Griffiths and Gürer Aykal. Their concerts are held at the Ahmed Adnan Saygun Arts Center in Konak, İzmir.

The children in the orchestra are aged between 7 and 17. They train and practice twice a week in the center at Eşrefpaşa.
