= List of tallest buildings in İzmir =

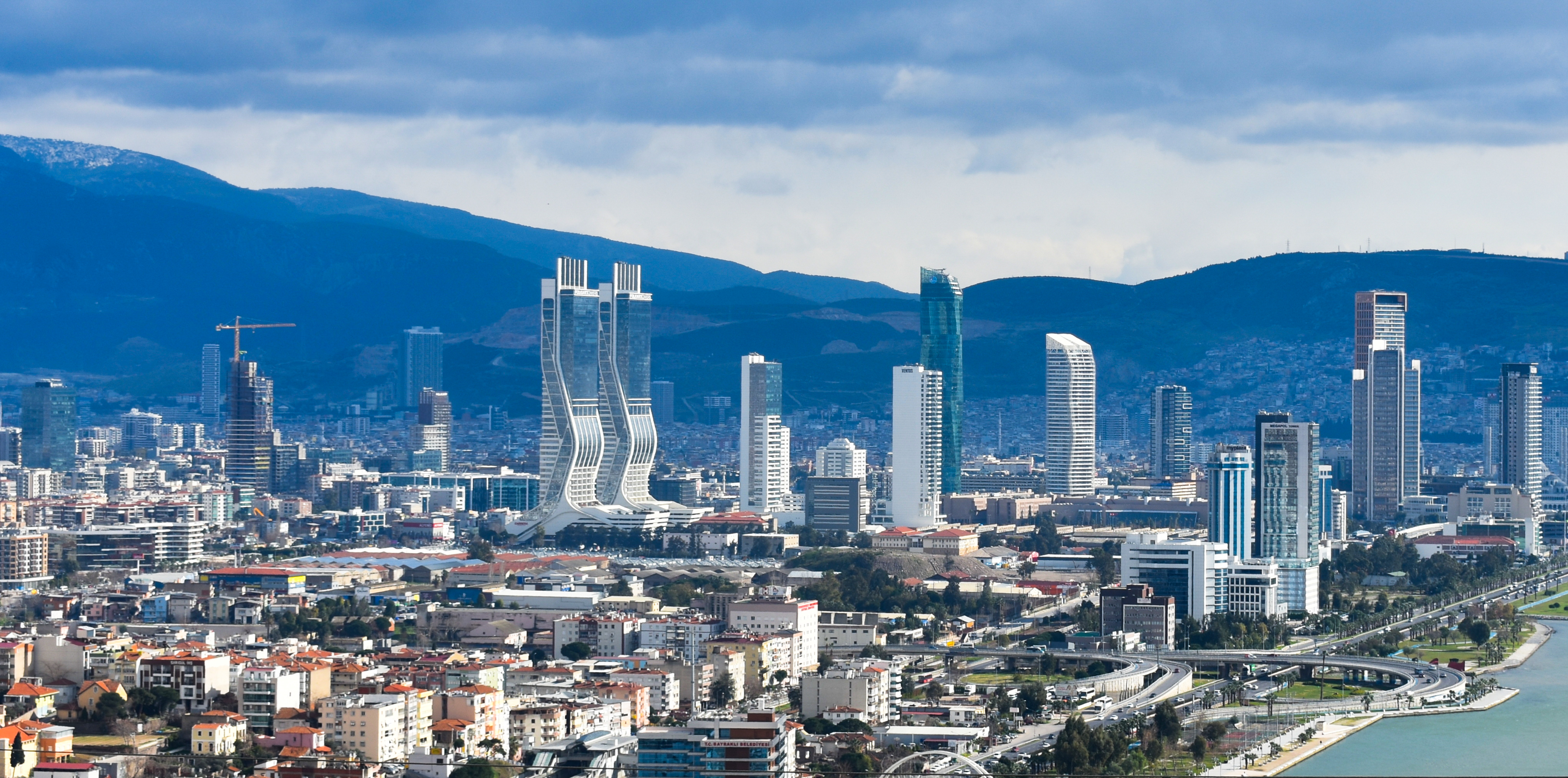
Modern İzmir skyline

İzmir, the third largest city in Turkey, is home to 45 buildings taller than 100 m (328 ft). Most of these buildings have been built after 2010 and are clustered near Bayraklı. The Hilton İzmir, built between 1987 and 1991, is considered to be the first skyscraper in the city and was the third tallest building in Turkey when it opened in 1991. The Mahall Bomonti, topped out in 2023, is the tallest building in Turkey outside of Istanbul, and the 6th tallest overall.

As of 2025, several more skyscrapers are either planned or under construction. Among them is the İnci Mega, which will become the tallest building in İzmir at 270m high (still no certain information about high) with 63 floors.

== Tallest buildings in İzmir ==
Was the tallest building in İzmir upon completion

Rank	Name	Image	Height m (ft)	Floors	District	Year	Notes
1	Mahall Bomonti		242 m (794 ft)	60	Konak	2024	(Note: Tallest building in İzmir then 2023.)
2	Mistral Office Tower		216 m (709 ft)	48	Konak	2017	(Note: Under construction, topped out in 2016. 11th tallest building in Turkey and 34th tallest building in Europe.)
3	Folkart Tower 1		200 m (660 ft)	47	Bayraklı	2014	(Note: Tallest building in İzmir between 2014 and 2016. First structure to reach a height of 200 meters in İzmir. 7th tallest building in Turkey and 47th tallest building in Europe.)
4	Folkart Tower 2		200 m (660 ft)	47	Bayraklı	2014	(Note: Tallest building in İzmir between 2014 and 2016. First structure to reach a height of 200 meters in İzmir. 7th tallest building in Turkey and 47th tallest building in Europe.)
5	Ege Perla Residence Tower		187 m (614 ft)	42	Konak	2016	
6	Point Bornova		168 m (551 ft)	50	Bornova	2018	
7	İnci Smyrna		165 m (541 ft)	47	Konak	2026	
8	Mistral Residence Tower		154 m (505 ft)	38	Konak	2016	(Note: 42nd tallest building in Turkey and 176th tallest building in Europe.)
9	Ikon Tower		152 m (499 ft)	39	Bornova	2018	(Note: Topped out in early 2018.)
10	Biva Tower		151 m (495 ft)	35	Bayraklı	2022	
11	Folkart Nova		143 m (469 ft)	38	Konak	2026	
12	Hilton Izmir		142 m (466 ft)	35	Konak	1991	(Note: Tallest building in İzmir between 1991 and 2014 and tallest building built in the city in the 1990s. First structure in İzmir to surpass 100 meters. 60th tallest building in Turkey.)
13	Ege Perla Office Tower		142 m (466 ft)	33	Konak	2016	
14	Megapol İzmir		140 m (460 ft)	38	Konak	2025	
15	Neva Yalı A		137 m (449 ft)	37	Bayraklı	2026	
16	Folkart Vega - A1		136 m (446 ft)	38	Konak	2022	
17	İzka Port		136 m (446 ft)	34	Bayraklı	2021	
18	Novus Tower		135 m (443 ft)	33	Bayraklı	2017	
19	Folkart Vega - B		133 m (436 ft)	37	Konak	2022	
20	Fors İzmir		129 m (423 ft)	33	Konak	2026	
21	Merkez Yaşam Konak		127 m (417 ft)	37	Konak	2025	
22	Livin İzmir		127 m (417 ft)	33	Karşıyaka	2020	
23	Ventus Tower		126 m (413 ft)	31	Bayraklı	2017	
24	Mia Port İzmir		125 m (410 ft)	34	Konak	2026	
25	Heris Tower		124 m (407 ft)	26	Konak	2001	(Note: Tallest building constructed in the 2000s.)
26	Crowne Plaza Izmir		113 m (371 ft)	27	Balçova	2002	
27	Megapol Tower		112 m (367 ft)	27	Bayraklı	2012	
28	The Port Residence		110 m (360 ft)	26	Konak	2009	
29	Varyant Tower		110 m (360 ft)	30	Bornova	2021	
30	Folkart Vega - A2		109 m (358 ft)	31	Konak	2022	
31	DAP İzmir A		109 m (358 ft)	30	Bornova	2021	
32	DAP İzmir B		109 m (358 ft)	30	Bornova	2021	
33	İstinye Park İzmir		108.6 m (356 ft)	25	Balçova	2021	
34	Ater Tower		106 m (348 ft)	27	Konak	2017	
35	My Plaza Tower		106 m (348 ft)	26	Bayraklı	2011	
36	İnci Premium		105 m (344 ft)	33	Konak	2025	
37	Port Marin		105 m (344 ft)	30	Karşıyaka	2019	
38	Neva Yalı B		104 m (341 ft)	28	Bayraklı	2026	
39	Neva Yalı C		104 m (341 ft)	28	Bayraklı	2026	
40	Folkart Incity A		100 m (328 ft)	29	Bornova	2020	
41	Folkart Incity B		100 m (328 ft)	29	Bornova	2020	
42	Bayraklı Tower		100 m (328 ft)	26	Bayraklı	2013	
43	Atılgan Royal		100 m (328 ft)	29	Karşıyaka	2019	
44	Ramada Encore İzmir		100 m (328 ft)	25	Balçova	2009	
45	Kılıçlar Tower		100 m (328 ft)	27	Bornova	2026	

== Number of high buildings in İzmir ==
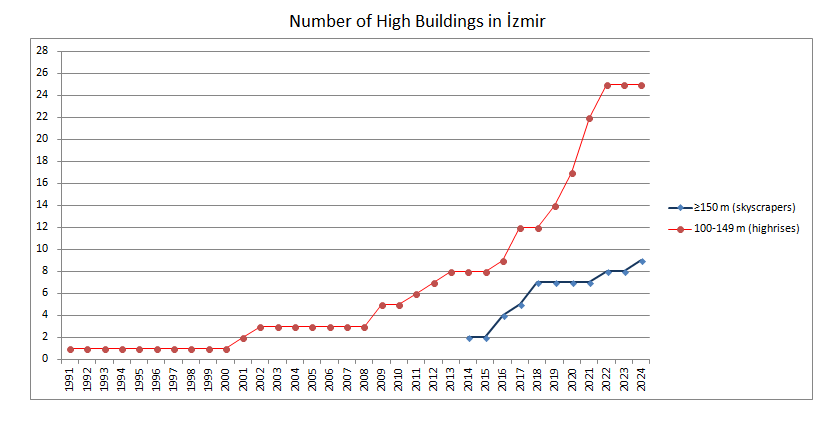

== Buildings under construction and preparation ==
Sıra	İsim	Height (m) (ft)	Floors	District	Scheduled Completion
1.	İnci Mega	275 m (902 ft)	64	Konak	2029
2.	V Yeni Konak A	187 m (614 ft)	51	Konak	2029
3.	Orion Stage 2-Hotel	173 m (568 ft)	50	Konak	2030
4.	Divan Residence	173 m (568 ft)	50	Konak	2028
5.	Orion Stage 1-A	163 m (535 ft)	45	Konak	2028
6.	Orion Stage 1-B	163 m (535 ft)	45	Konak	2028
7.	Teras 35 C	161 m (528 ft)	40	Bayraklı	2029
8.	Riva Yalı A	145 m (476 ft)	37	Bayraklı	2029
9.	Riva Yalı B	140 m (459 ft)	35	Bayraklı	2029
10.	Viven Tower	140 m (459 ft)	38	Bornova	On Hold
11.	İnci Center	135 m (443 ft)	36	Konak	2028
12.	Folkart Orion Office	132 m (433 ft)	31	Konak	2030
13.	Teras 35 D	128 m (420 ft)	31	Bayraklı	2029
14.	Bay Towers 1	123 m (404 ft)	36	Konak	2027
15.	Folkart Orion Hospital	110 m (361 ft)	28	Konak	Prep
16.	Bronz Kule	110 m (361 ft)	28	Bayraklı	2027
17.	Riva Yalı C	110 m (361 ft)	32	Bayraklı	2029
18.	V Yeni Konak B	108 m (354 ft)	28	Konak	2029
19.	Bay Towers 2	103 m (338 ft)	30	Konak	2027
20.	Azur Office	100 m (328 ft)	26	Konak	2028
21.	Velux Bayraklı	100 m (328 ft)	27	Konak	2027

== Timeline of Tallest buildings in İzmir ==
Name	Image	Height (m) (ft)	Floors	District	Year
Hilton İzmir		142 m (466 ft)	35	Konak	1991-2014
Folkart Towers		200 m (656 ft)	47	Bayraklı	2014-2017
Mistral Office Tower		216 m (709 ft)	48	Konak	2017-2024
Mahall Bomonti		242 m (794 ft)	58	Konak	2024-Present

Updated as of 8 February 2026.

- This list includes only completed or topped-out structures.

== Proposed buildings ==
Rank	Name	Height (m) (ft)	Floors	District
1.	Sabancı Tower 1	250 m (820 ft)	70	Bayraklı
2.	Viltur Villa Saray A	215 m (705 ft)	51	Bayraklı
3.	Viltur Villa Saray B	215 m (705 ft)	51	Bayraklı
4.	Zorlu Tower	200 m (656 ft)	50	Konak
5.	Sabancı Tower 2	180 m (591 ft)	45	Bayraklı
6.	Alsancak Residence A	180 m (591 ft)	50	Konak
7.	Alsancak Residence B	170 m (558 ft)	40	Konak
8.	Blue Sky Tower	165 m (541 ft)	40	Bayraklı
9.	Gümüş Tower	160 m (525 ft)	40	Bayraklı
10.	Bulvar Pera	130 m (427 ft)	37	Bayraklı
11.	Biva Twins	110 m (361 ft)	31	Bayraklı
12.	Biva Twins	110 m (361 ft)	31	Bayraklı
13.	Casa Mia Blu	100 m (328 ft)	28	Bayraklı

== See also ==
- List of tallest buildings in Europe
