= DDY =

DDY can refer to:

- Douglas DC-4 Skymaster, registration PH-DDY, an aircraft owned by the Dutch Dakota Association
- The Dudwindi railroad station in India
- D.D.Y. Hastanesi, a hospital in İzmir, Turkey
- Dennis DeYoung (born 1947), American musician
- Double Dare You, film production company associated with Guillermo del Toro
- Dirty Disco Youth, alias for German disc jockey and former Scooter member Phil Speiser
