= Folkart Towers =

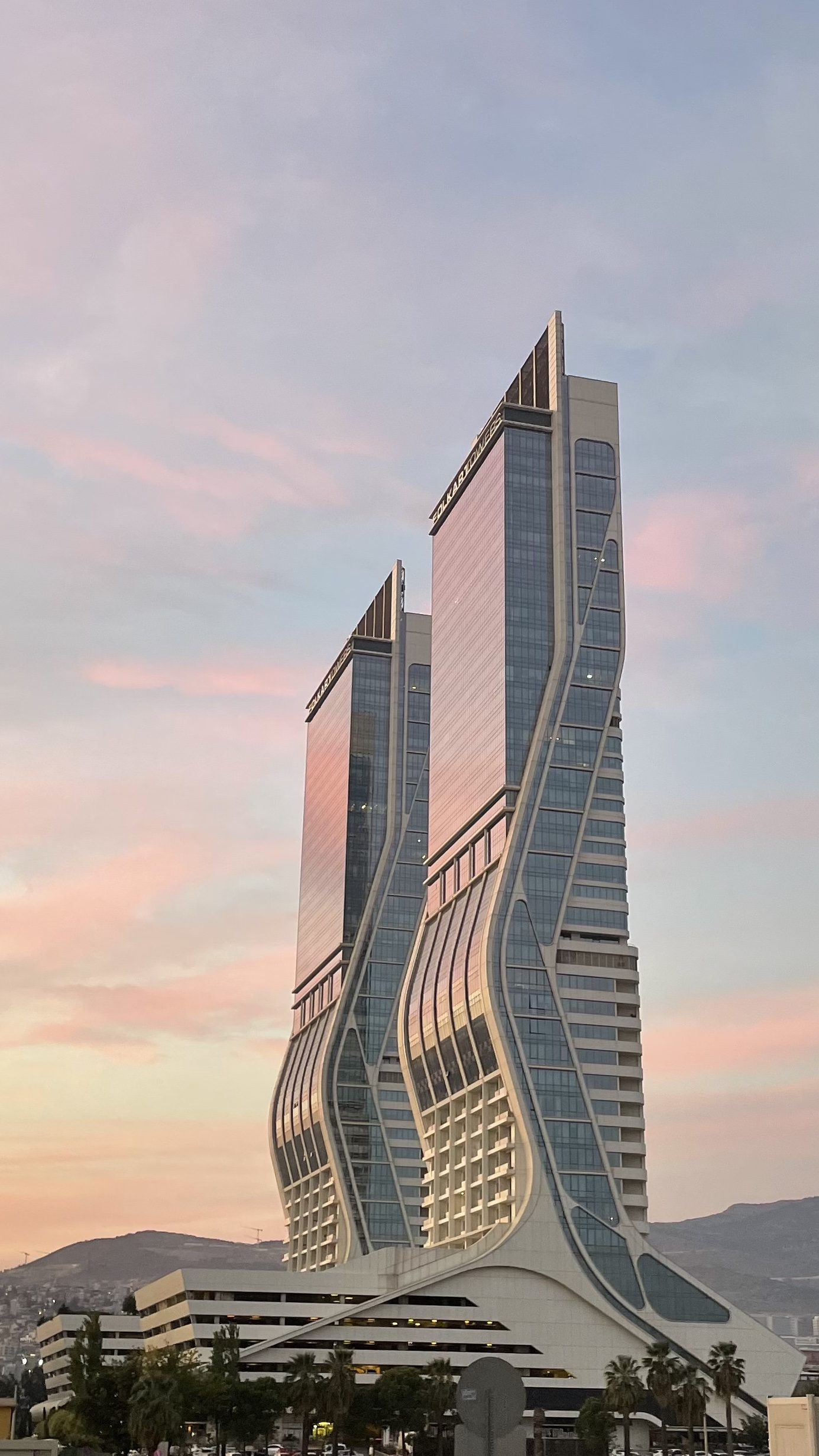
- Folkart Towers in İzmir
- Interactive map of the Folkart Towers area

General information
- Status: Completed
- Type: Mixed-use: Residential, Office
- Location: 37 Manas Boulevard, Bayraklı, İzmir, Turkey
- Coordinates: 38.449352°N 27.180125°E
- Construction started: 2011
- Opening: September 2014
- Cost: US$150,000,000

Height
- Architectural: 200 m (660 ft) (for both)

Technical details
- Floor count: 47 (above ground for both)

Design and construction
- Architect: Yağcıoğlu Architecture
- Developer: Folkart Construction

Folkart Towers is a mixed-use skyscraper complex consisting in two twin towers located in the Bayraklı district of the Turkish city of İzmir. Reaching a structural height of 200 m (656 ft) with 47 floors above ground level each, they were the tallest buildings in İzmir between 2014 and 2017, until the completion of the 48-floor (216 m (709 ft)) Mistral Office Tower.

The construction of the towers began in 2011 and in April 2013, they surpassed Hilton İzmir to become the tallest buildings in the city. The construction works were completed in 2014. During their construction, 1000 people were employed, and upon completion, they were expected to be the place of residence or work for 4000 people. In February 2015, the largest art gallery in Turkey was opened in the towers. The gallery has an area of 800 m^{2}.

== Images ==
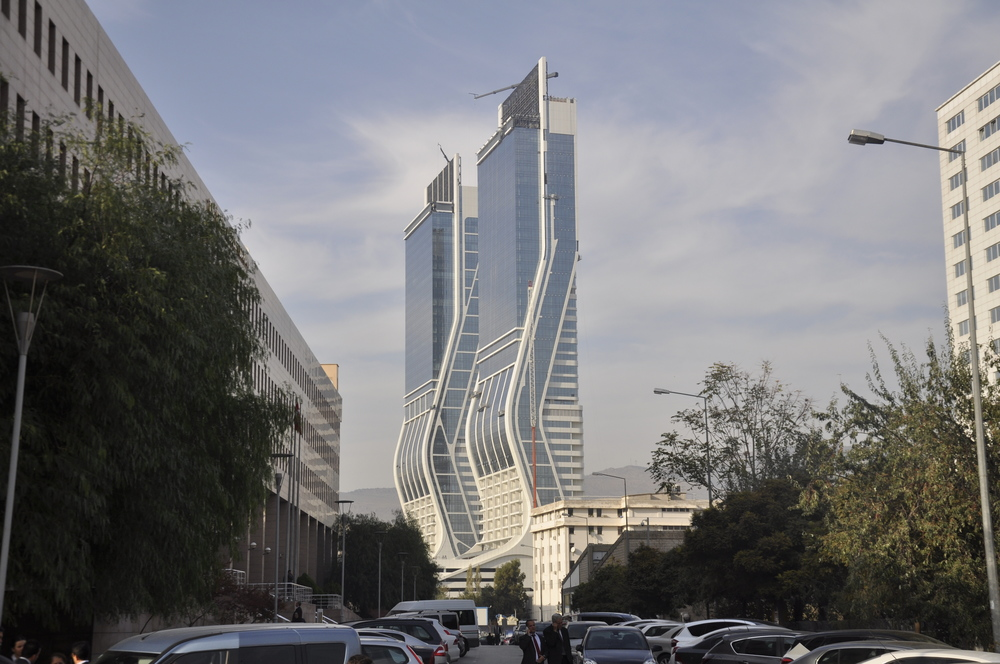
Folkart Towers

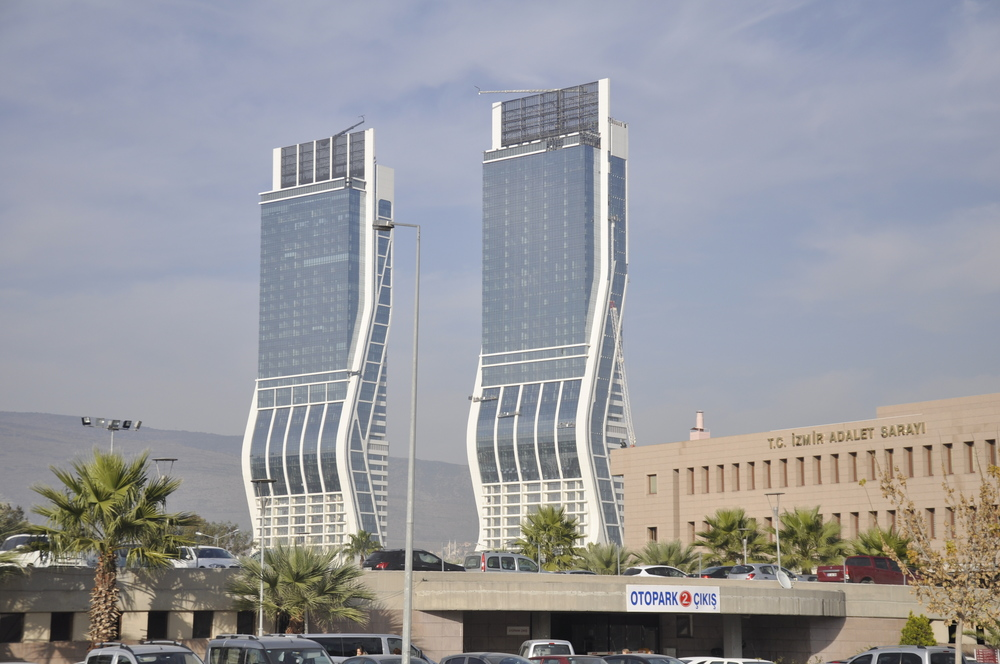
Folkart Towers

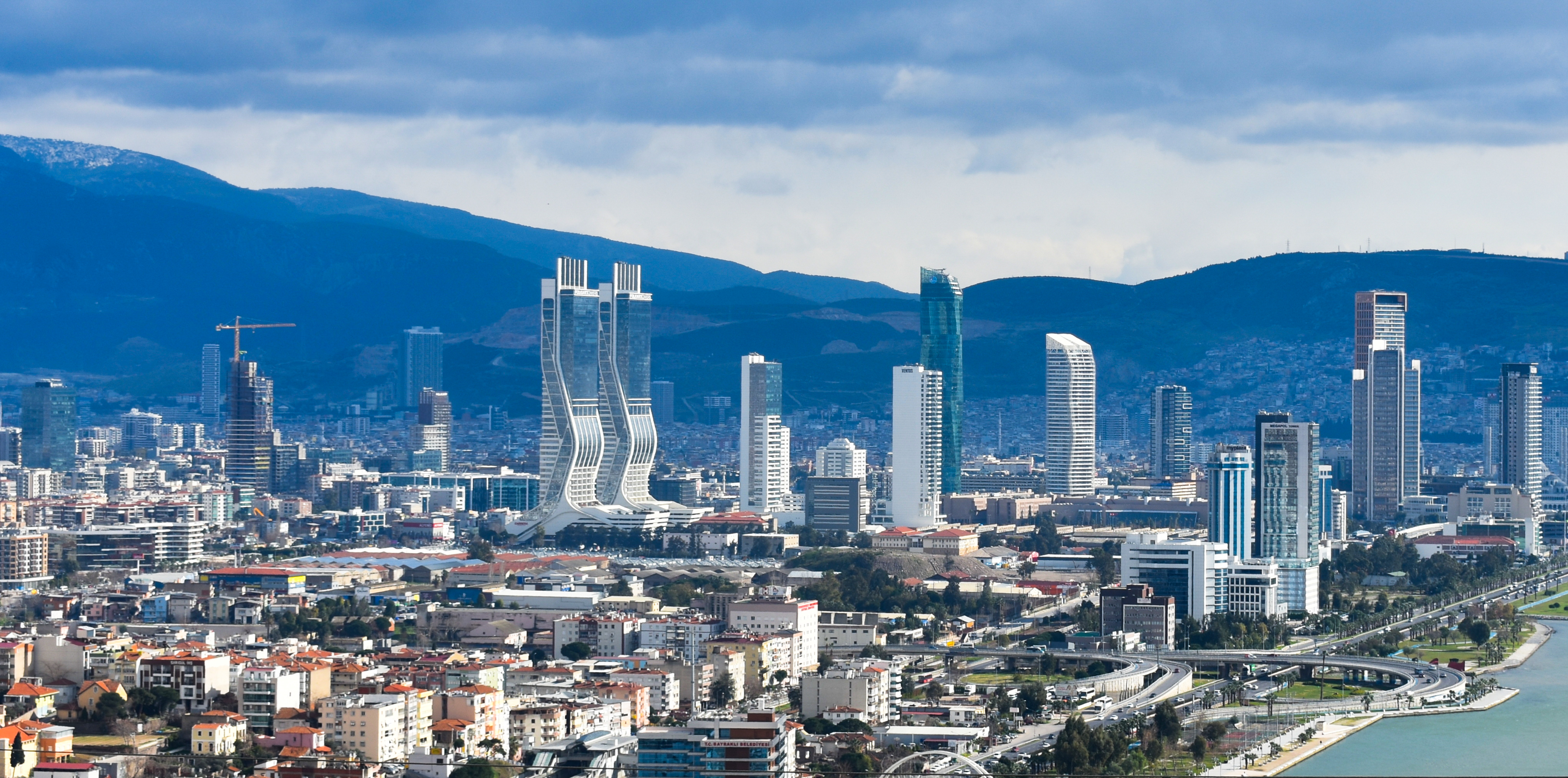
Folkart Towers in İzmir

== See also ==
- List of tallest buildings in İzmir
- List of tallest buildings in Turkey
