= Dr. Selahattin Akçiçek Cultural Center =

- Dr. Selahattin Akçiçek Kültür Merkezi
- Interactive map of the Dr. Selahattin Akçiçek Cultural Center area

General information
- Location: Konak, İzmir, İnönü Cad. 2/1, Bayramyeri, Turkey
- Coordinates: 38°24′39.3″N 27°07′40.5″E
- Owner: Konak Municipality Cultural and Social Affairs Directorate

Dr. Selahattin Akçiçek Cultural Center (Turkish: Dr. Selahattin Akçiçek Kültür Merkezi) is a building for art and cultural activities located in Konak, İzmir, Turkey. It is named after the former İzmir mayor Selahattin Akçiçek (1918–1977). The center facilitates art and culture activities for Konak district and Greater İzmir. It is affiliated with the Konak Municipality Cultural and Social Affairs Directorate.

== Facilities ==
The center facilitates the Avni Anıl Theater, a small hall, a painting workshop and a course room.

=== Avni Anıl Theater ===
Avni Anıl Theater
- Avni Anıl Sahnesi
- Interactive map of Avni Anıl Theater
- Capacity: 278 seated

The theater with 278 seats is used as a multipurpose concert, theater and panel hall.

=== Workshop ===
The painting workshop, with a capacity of 15 people, facilitates guitar and theater lessons additional to painting courses.

=== The halls ===
The small hall has a capacity of 40 people, and hosts choir activities.

The 1/A hall has a capacity of 30 people, and is used as a theater, guitar, choir or chess room.

== Cultural activities ==
The facility hosts many different cultural and art oriented activities. Some of the regularly given activities include choir, theater, chess and painting. The facilities also host other events such as architecture workshops for school children.

== Other ==
The Republican People's Party (CHP) holds district council meetings at the center. The meeting in April 2018 started with opening statements open to press, and continued with session closed to the press.
