= Hilton Izmir =

Hotel in Izmir, Turkey

Hilton İzmir
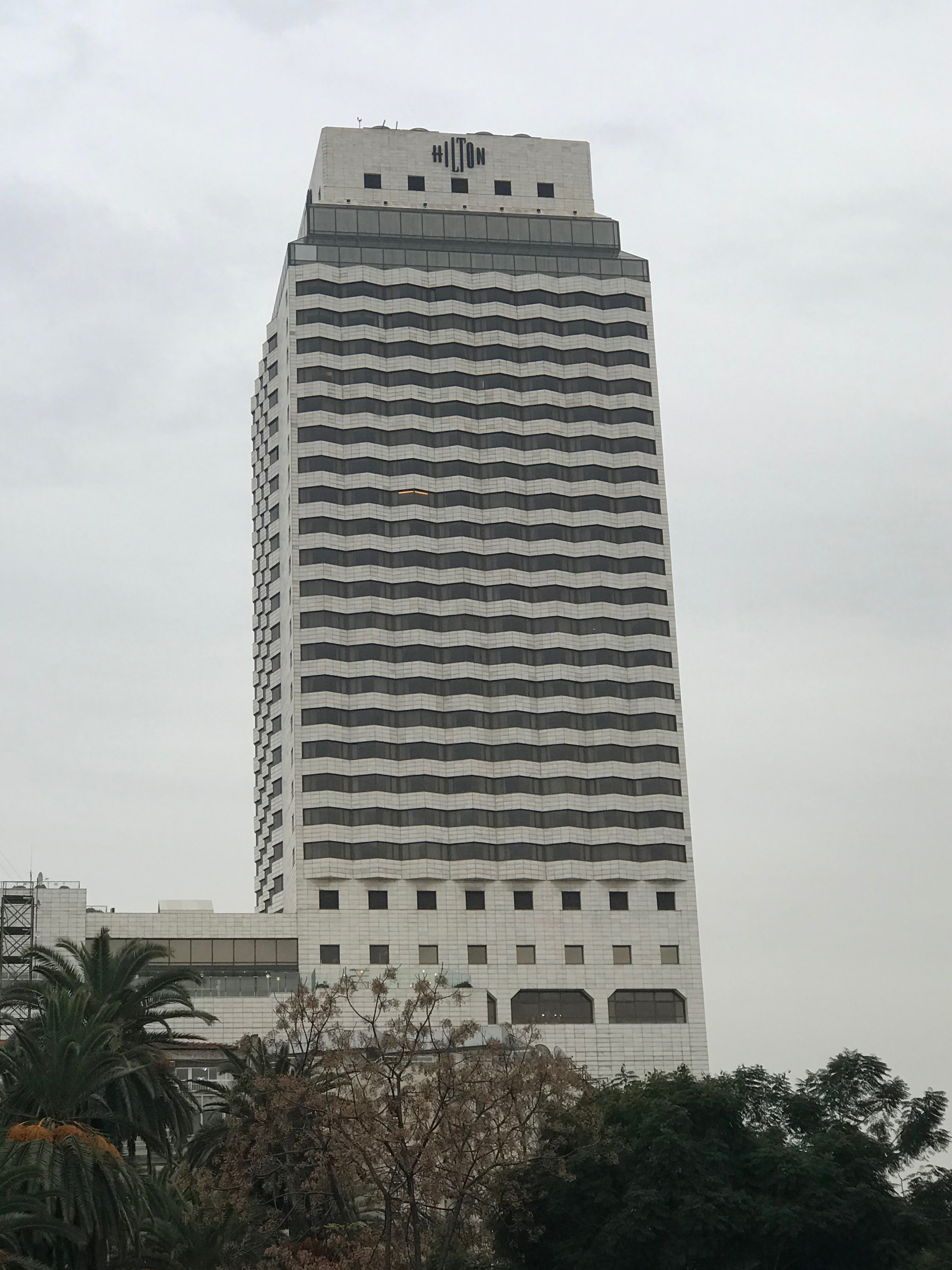
- Hilton İzmir
- Interactive map of the Hilton İzmir area

General information
- Location: İsmet Kaptan Mahallesi, Gazi Osman Paşa Bulvarı, No: 7, Konak, İzmir, Turkey 35210, İzmir, Turkey
- Construction started: 1988
- Inaugurated: 4 July 1992
- Owner: İzmir Enternasyonel Otelcilik A.Ş.
- Operator: Hilton Hotels & Resorts (1992-2020); İzmir Enternasyonal Otelcilik A.Ş. (2020-today)

Height
- Height: 142 metres (466 ft)

Technical details
- Floor count: 33
- Lifts/elevators: 4

Design and construction
- Architect: Tanju Gültekin

The Hilton Izmir was a five-star hotel in İzmir, Turkey. The hotel tower has 33 floors and a structural height of 142 metres (466 ft.).

== History ==
Upon its completion in 1992, the Hilton Izmir became the tallest building in the city, and the third tallest building in Turkey after the 52-floor (176.8 metres (580 ft)) Mertim Tower (1987) in Mersin, and the 29-floor (143 metres (469 ft), including the spire) Sheraton Ankara (1991) in Ankara. Hilton Izmir remained the tallest building in İzmir and the Aegean Region until 2014, when the 47-floor (200 m (656 ft)) Folkart Twin Towers were completed.

The hotel was nominated for the Leading Conference Hotel in Turkey award by the World Travel Awards each year from 2007 to 2012.

The Hilton Izmir closed permanently on October 16, 2020.

The shuttered hotel hosted survivors of the 2020 Aegean Sea earthquake from October 2020 for at least three months. The shuttered hotel again hosted survivors of the 2023 Turkey-Syria earthquakes from 10 March 2023 on. In July 2025, the Izmir Metropolitan Municipality transferred its company shares.

== See also ==
- List of tallest buildings in İzmir
