= Eşrefpaşa =

Coordinates: 38°24′N 27°09′E

Kadifekale

Eşrefpaşa is a popular and rooted neighborhood of İzmir within the metropolitan district of Konak. It does not have an official status and delimitation and exists rather as a notion. Eşrefpaşa encompasses up to twenty officially constituted and densely populated quarters (mahalle) in the city's inner parts. It is admitted as a zone (semt) that extends along the two sides of the street of the same name, Eşrefpaşa Street (Eşrefpaşa Caddesi), about five kilometers long, which was opened by the marking mayor of İzmir, Eşref Pasha (administration between 1895-1907) in early 20th century. The street was named after him and the neighborhoods that surround the street are also still referred to by his name.

The street departs at a point near the Basmane train station marked by a mosque and further a hospital that carry the same name and were built by the same pasha (Eşref Paşa Mosque and Eşrefpaşa Hospital) and extends tangentially to the slopes of Kadifekale to reach where Konak proper ends at the outskirts of the plain and the neighboring district of Bornova.

As soon as it was opened for residential use, the neighborhood became one of the cores of the Turkish İzmir, along with the neighboring Hatay, another zone that unites several quarters and is named after the arterial street (Hatay Caddesi). Over the years, Eşrefpaşa was a zone where successive waves of immigrants, Turks of Bulgaria and Macedonia, Crimean Tatars, Cretan Turks were first settled in İzmir, and the trend continues to this day with a notable concentration of immigrants from Eastern Anatolia. The name of the neighborhood became synonymous across Turkey with an original urban culture of bravado as well as a peculiar set of values, a consequence of the hybrid tissues of its population. In that, Eşrefpaşa is, with degrees varying, very similar to Istanbul neighborhood of Kasımpaşa.

Eşref Pasha himself (full name Hacı Mehmed Eşref Pasha) was a late-19th century Ottoman administrator who had risen to the position of deputy governor for Syria and who was known for his piousness and smooth human contacts. After his retirement, he was delegated as chairman for İzmir's municipal assembly (mayor in attorney in practical terms) in 1895 prior to the elections the year after. The governor Kıbrıslı Mehmed Kamil Pasha having put his weight after his name, he became the mayor in 1896 and worked in harmony with the provincial administration for twelve years until he quit in 1907 for reasons of health. He is still associated by many public works, initiatives and projects for the benefit of the city of İzmir.

== Cultural activity ==
In 2015 the Barış Youth Symphony Orchestra was founded with its center in the neighborhood, incorporating children with limited opportunities with the purpose to keep them away from crime on the street existing in the neighborhood. The orchestra, grown up to nearly one hundred members coming also from other neighbors of the city, gives concerts accompanied by notable classic music artists.
