= İzmir Toy Museum =

- İzmir Oyuncak Müzesi
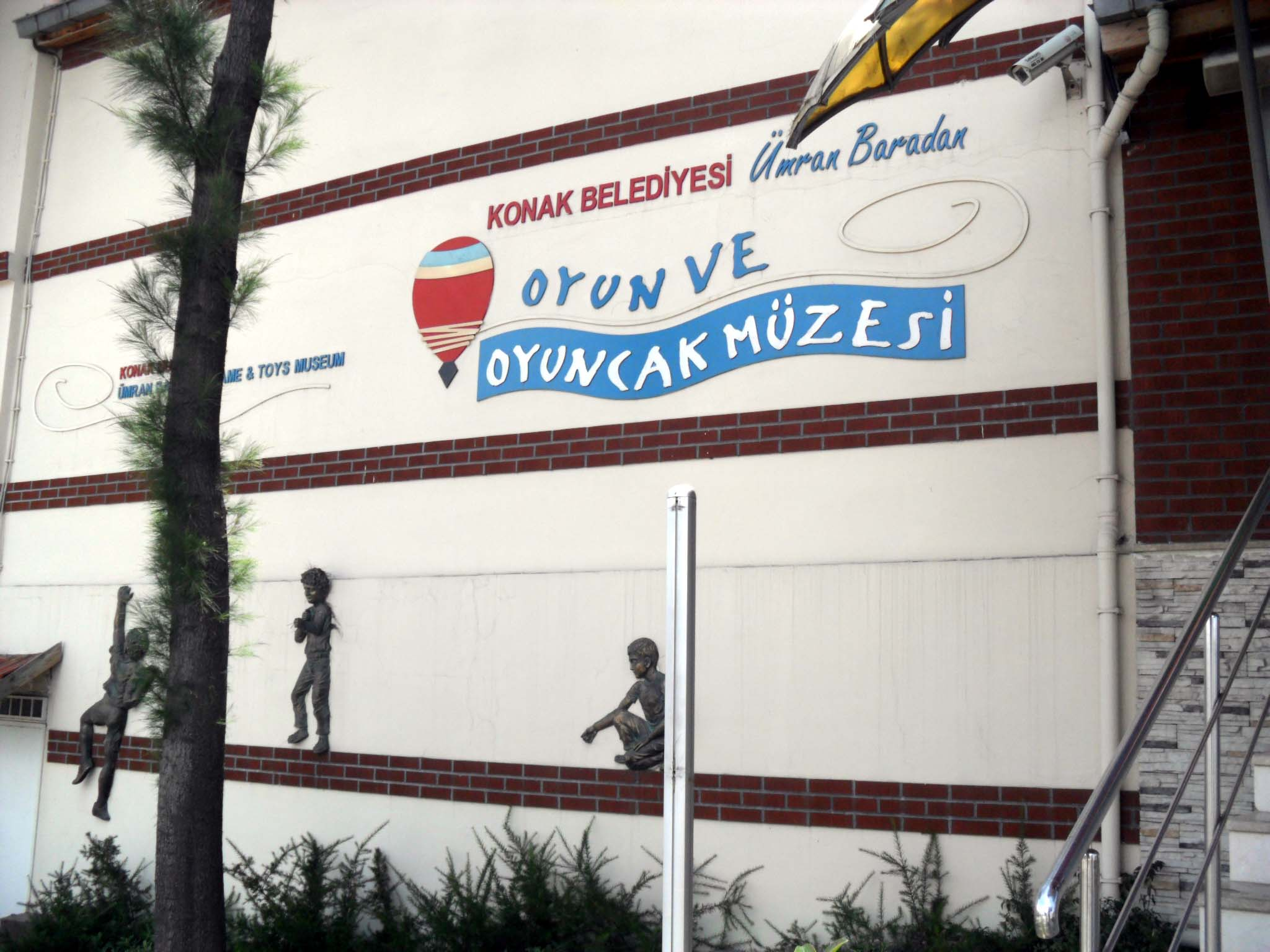

- Location within Turkey
- Established: 2010
- Location: Halil Rifat Paşa mah 31 Konak, İzmir, Turkey
- Coordinates: 38°24′48″N 27°07′37″E
- Type: Toy museum
- Collection size: 1000
- Website: www.izmiroyuncakmuzesi.com

İzmir Toy Museum (also called “Ümran Baradan Toy Museum”) is a museum of toys in İzmir, Turkey. The museum is situated near Varyant street on Halil Rifat Paşa mah 31, Konak.

== History ==
The museum was established by ceramic artist, Ümran Baradan. In 2005, she donated a two-storey house and toys she had purchased in various countries. Later, Sunay Akın, who had previously founded İstanbul Toy Museum, contributed various items to the museum.

== The museum ==
The museum is now run by the municipality of Konak (an intracity district of İzmir.) The ground floor contains objects donated by Ümran Baradan. The first floor is reserved for Sunay Akın's donations.

== Exhibits ==
In addition to classical Turkish toys, such as Karagöz and Hacivat, toys from many countries are displayed. Some examples are:

- 1860 Baby carriage (United States)
- 1880 Cardboard town (United Kingdom)
- 1920 Teddy bear (Germany)
- 1920 Dancing girl (Italy)
- 1920 Baby house (Turkey-Alanya)
- 1930 Washing machine (United States)
- 1920s Tin automobiles (United States, United Kingdom and Germany)
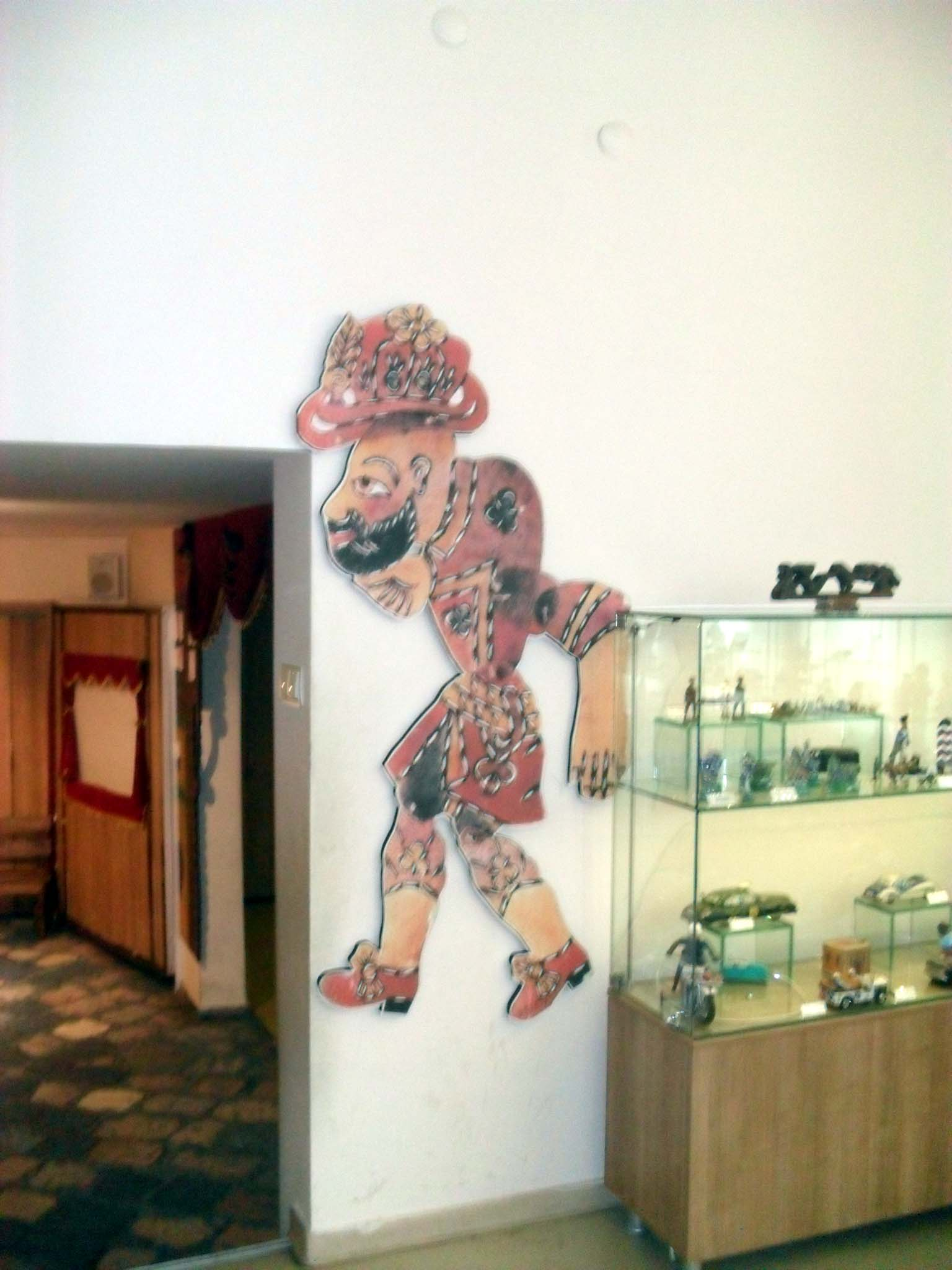
Karagöz

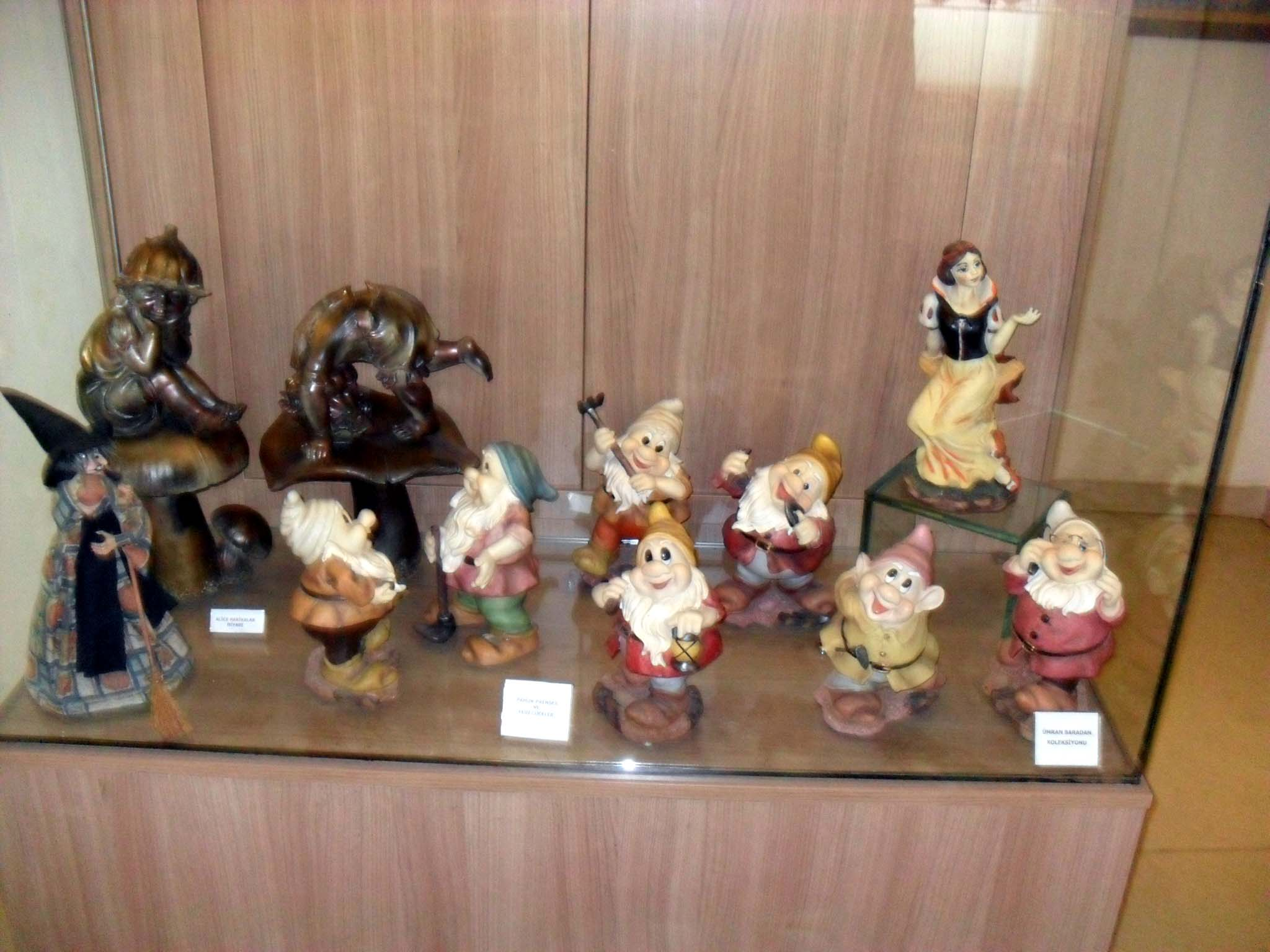
Snow White and the Seven Dwarfs
