= İzmir Women's Museum =

Women museum in İzmir

- İzmir Kadın Müzesi
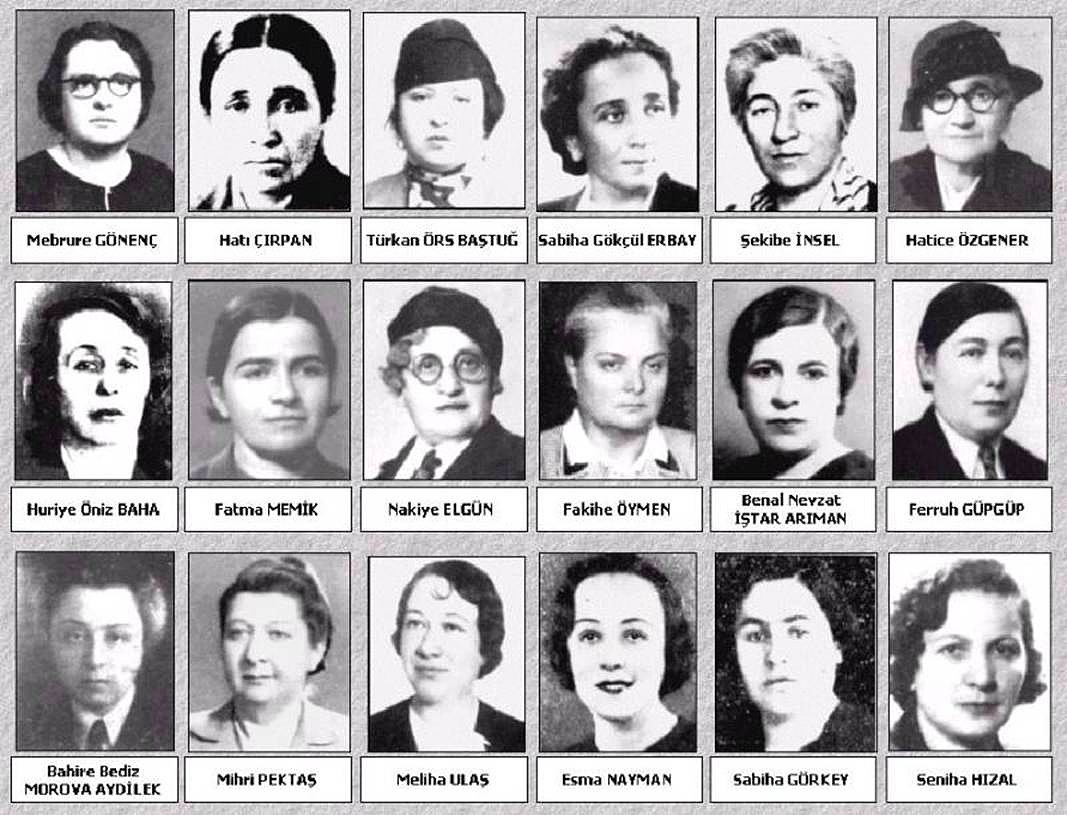
- First female MPs of the Turkish Parliament (1935)

- İzmir Women's Museum
- Established: 2014; 12 years ago
- Location: 1298 sok No 14, Basmane. İzmir
- Coordinates: 38°25′15″N 27°08′32″E
- Type: Women museum
- Owner: Konak Municipality
- Website: İzmir Women's Museum

İzmir Women's Museum is a museum in İzmir, Turkey. It is at 38°25′15″N 27°08′32″E in Konak secondary municipality of İzmir. It is the first women's museum to be established in Turkey. The museum building is a three floor-historical building in Tilkilik neighborhood. With a bay window it is a "typical" İzmir house, with a total of 13 rooms. It was opened on 23 January 2014.

== History ==
İzmir Women's Museum is a museum in İzmir, Turkey. It is at 38°25′15″N 27°08′32″E in Konak secondary municipality of İzmir. It is the first women's museum to be established in Turkey.

The museum building is a three floor-historical building in the Tilkilik neighborhood. With a bay window it is a typical İzmir house, with features from European and traditional Turkish architecture. It was opened on 23 January 2014.

The museum has a total of 13 rooms. In the ground floor, there is a photo of Mustafa Kemal Atatürk, the founder of modern Turkey dancing with his adopted daughter Nebile Hanim during the wedding ceremony of the latter. Various attire including golden-embroidery bindallı are displayed. A photo timeline of Turkish women, a library and a video room are also on the ground floor.

The masks of pioneer Turkish women such as Halide Edib Adıvar, Cahide Sonku, Afife Jale, Füreya Koral are displayed in the garden. In the garden, there is also a statue of Nazım Hikmet. The upper floor is reserved for the women's struggles, protest and boycotts presenting with a narration. In the upper floor there is also a collection room with documents and tools both from the Ottoman and the Republican era.
