= Karabağlar =

- District and municipality
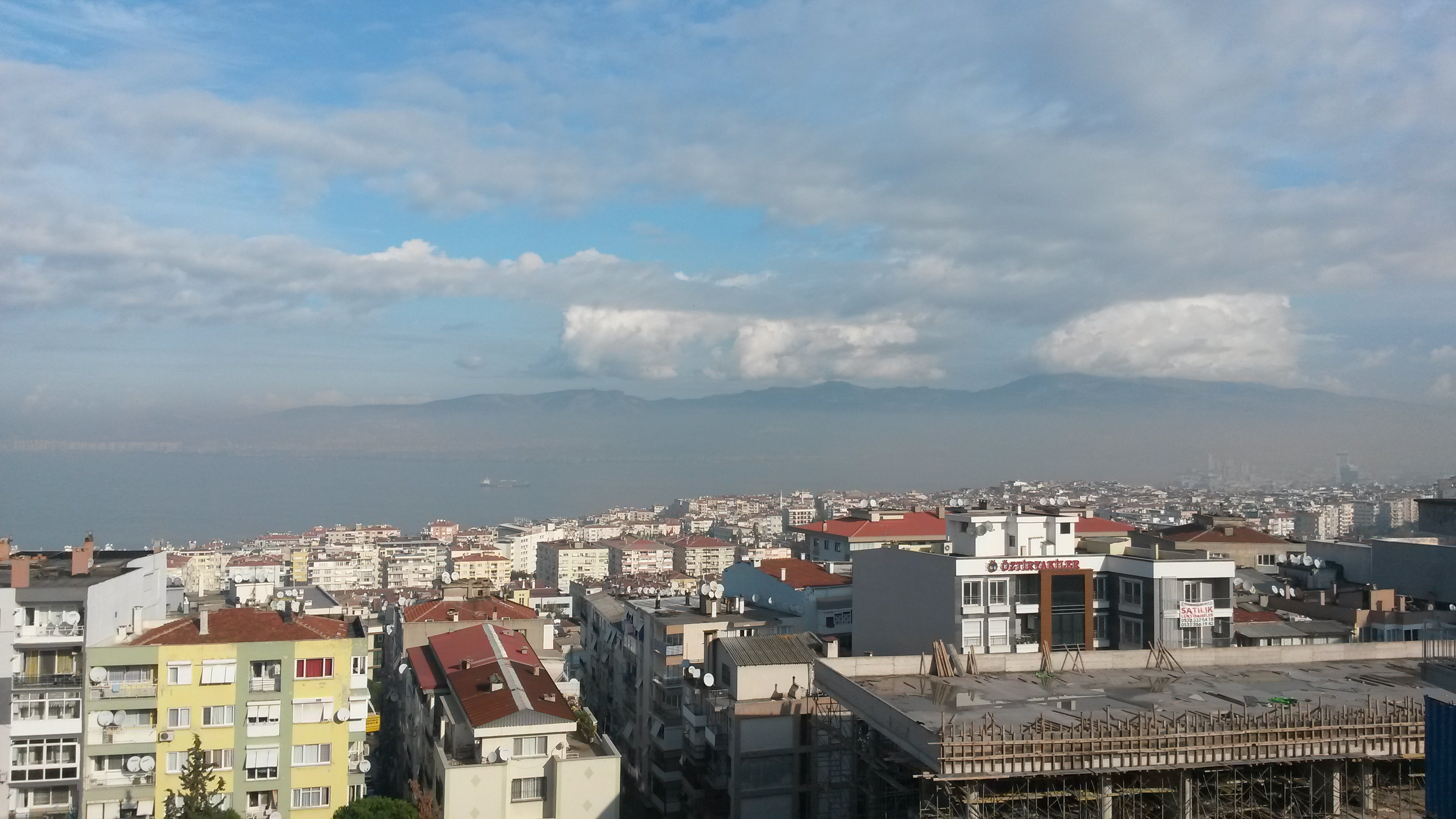

- Logo

- Map showing Karabağlar District in İzmir Province

- Location within Turkey Location within İzmir
- Coordinates: 38°22′45″N 27°07′03″E
- Country: Turkey
- Province: İzmir

Government
  - Mayor: Emi̇ne Heli̇l İnay Kınay (Yeni Parti)
- Area: 89 km^{2} (34 sq mi)
- Population (2022): 479,338
  - Density: 5,400/km^{2} (14,000/sq mi)
- Time zone: UTC+3 (TRT)
- Area code: 0232
- Website: www.karabaglar.bel.tr

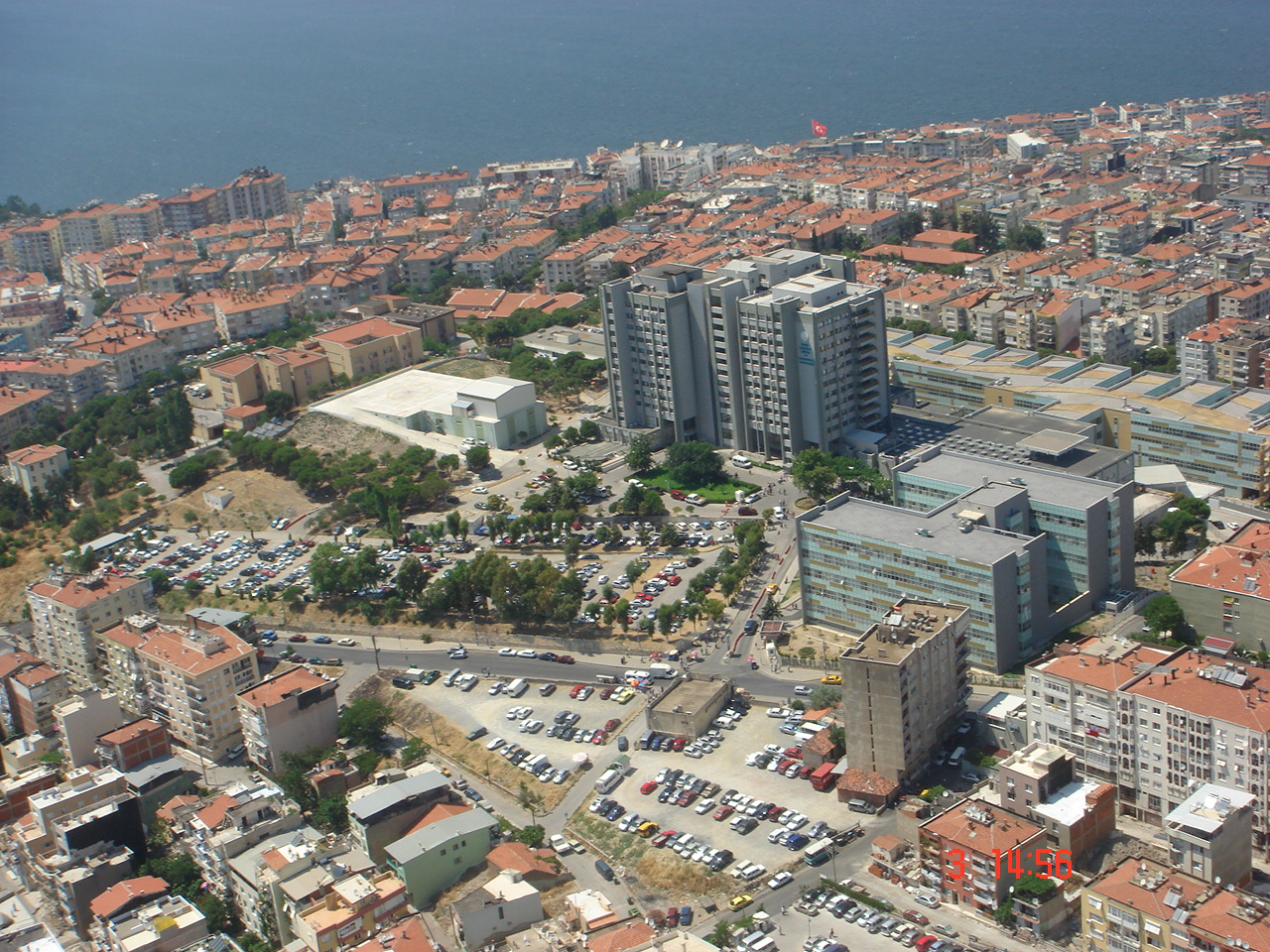
Atatürk Hospital in Karabağlar

Karabağlar (Turkish: [kaˈɾabaːɫaɾ]) is a municipality and district of İzmir Province, Turkey. Its area is 89 km^{2}, and its population is 479,338 (2022). It is the second biggest district of İzmir Province as terms of population. It covers the south-central part of the metropolitan area of İzmir. The district of Karabağlar was created in 2008 from a portion of the district of Konak.

== Composition ==
There are 58 neighbourhoods in Karabağlar District:

- Abdi İpekçi
- Adnan Süvari
- Ali Fuat Cebesoy
- Ali Fuat Erdem
- Araphasan
- Aşık Veysel
- Aydın
- Bahar
- Bahçelievler
- Bahriye Üçok
- Barış
- Basın Sitesi
- Bozyaka
- Çalıkuşu
- Cennetçeşme
- Cennetoğlu
- Devrim
- Doğanay
- Esenlik
- Esentepe
- Esenyalı
- Fahrettin Altay
- Gazi
- General Asım Gündüz
- General Kazım Özalp
- Gülyaka
- Günaltay
- İhsan Alyanak
- Karabağlar
- Kavacık, Karabağlar
- Kazımkarabekir
- Kibar
- Limontepe
- Maliyeciler
- Metin Oktay
- Muammer Akar
- Osman Aksüner
- Özgür
- Peker
- Poligon
- Refet Bele
- Reis
- Salih Omurtak
- Sarıyer
- Şehitler
- Selvili
- Sevgi
- Tahsin Yazıcı
- Tırazlı, Karabağlar
- Üçkuyular
- Uğur Mumcu
- Umut
- Uzundere
- Vatan
- Yaşar Kemal
- Yunusemre
- Yurtoğlu
- Yzb. Şerafettin

== See also ==
- Hatay, İzmir
