= Mistral Office Tower =

- Mistral Ofis Kulesi
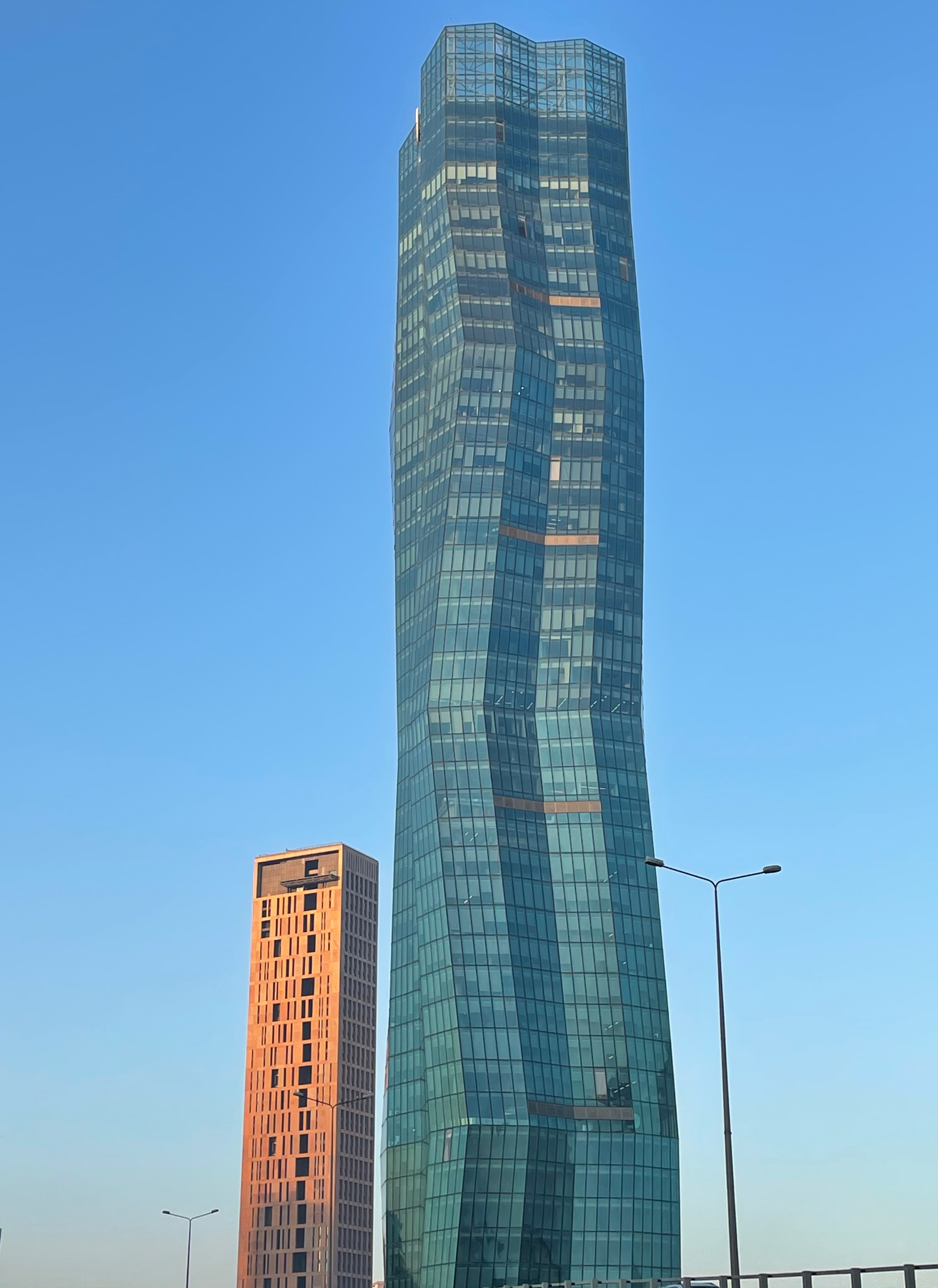
- Mistral Office Tower
- Interactive map of the Mistral Office Tower area

General information
- Status: Completed
- Type: Office building
- Location: Ankara Cd. 15, Çınarlı Mah., Konak, İzmir, Turkey
- Coordinates: 38°26′52.9″N 27°10′45.8″E
- Construction started: 2019

Height
- Architectural: 216 m (709 ft)
- Tip: 216 m (709 ft)

Technical details
- Material: Concrete and Glass
- Floor count: 48

Design and construction
- Architecture firm: DNA Mimarlik, Maer & Partners

Website
- mistralizmir.com.tr/en/

The Mistral Office Tower (Turkish: Mistral Ofis Kulesi), commonly referred to as Mistral Office or simply Mistral Tower, is a 48-floor, 216 m (709 ft) tall office skyscraper in İzmir, Turkey. Located in the extreme northeast corner of the Konak district, it is currently the tallest building in İzmir (the tallest building in Turkey outside of Istanbul, and the 6th tallest building in Turkey overall.) Together with the Mistral Residential Tower (38 floors / 154 m (505 ft)), the Mistral Office Tower is part of the Mistral İzmir complex.

== Images ==
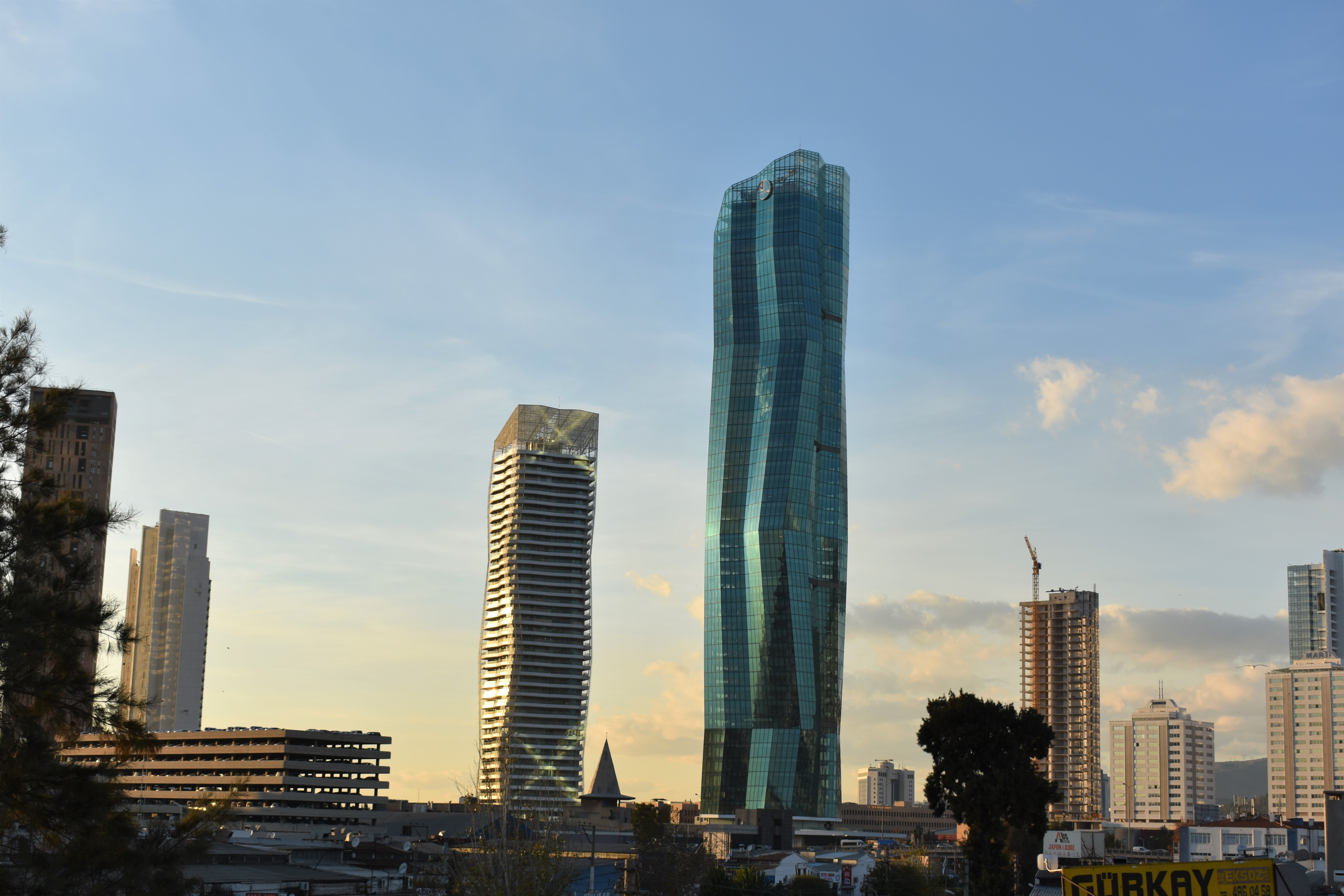
Mistral Towers in İzmir

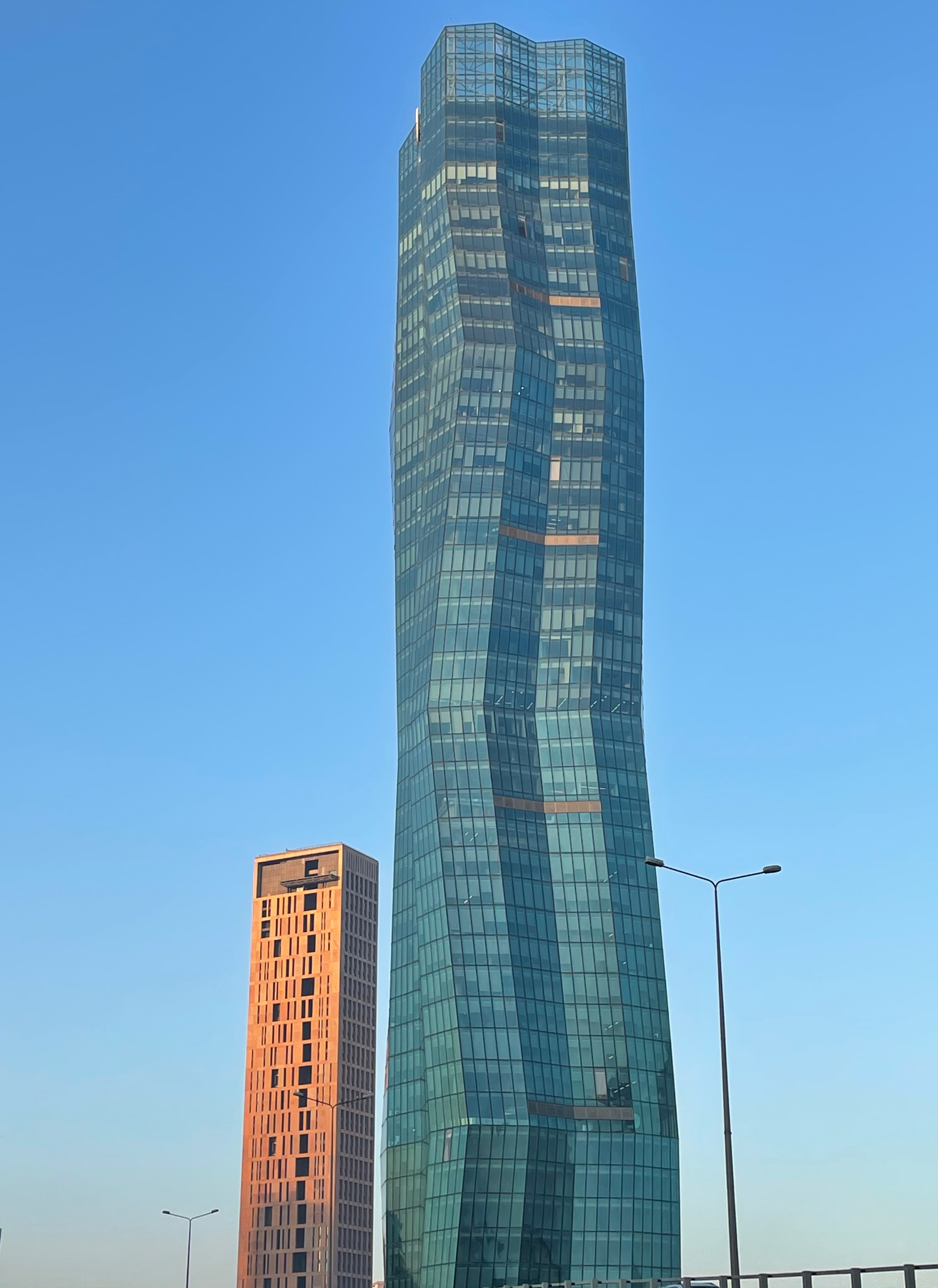
Mistral Office Tower

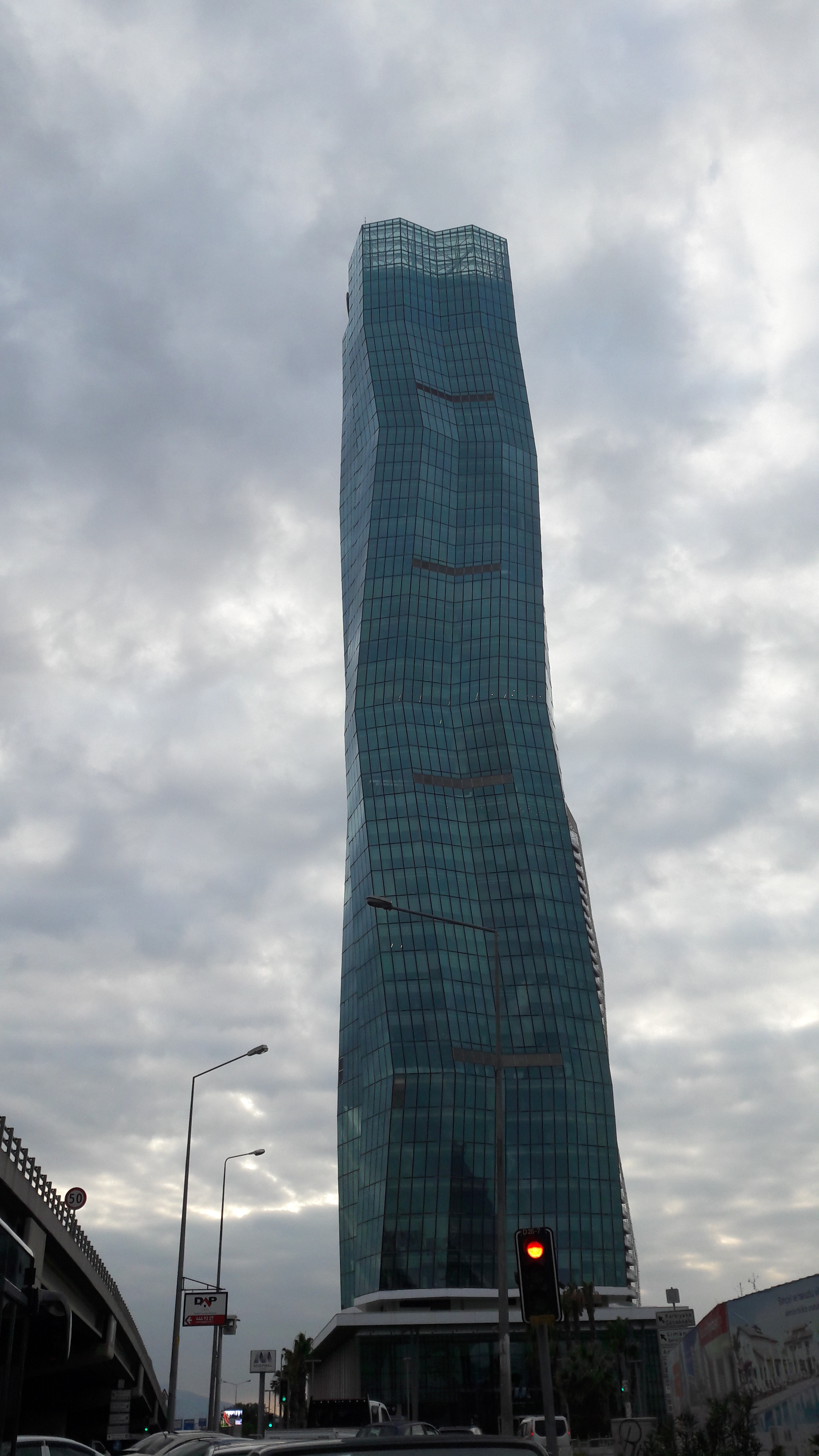
Mistral Office Tower

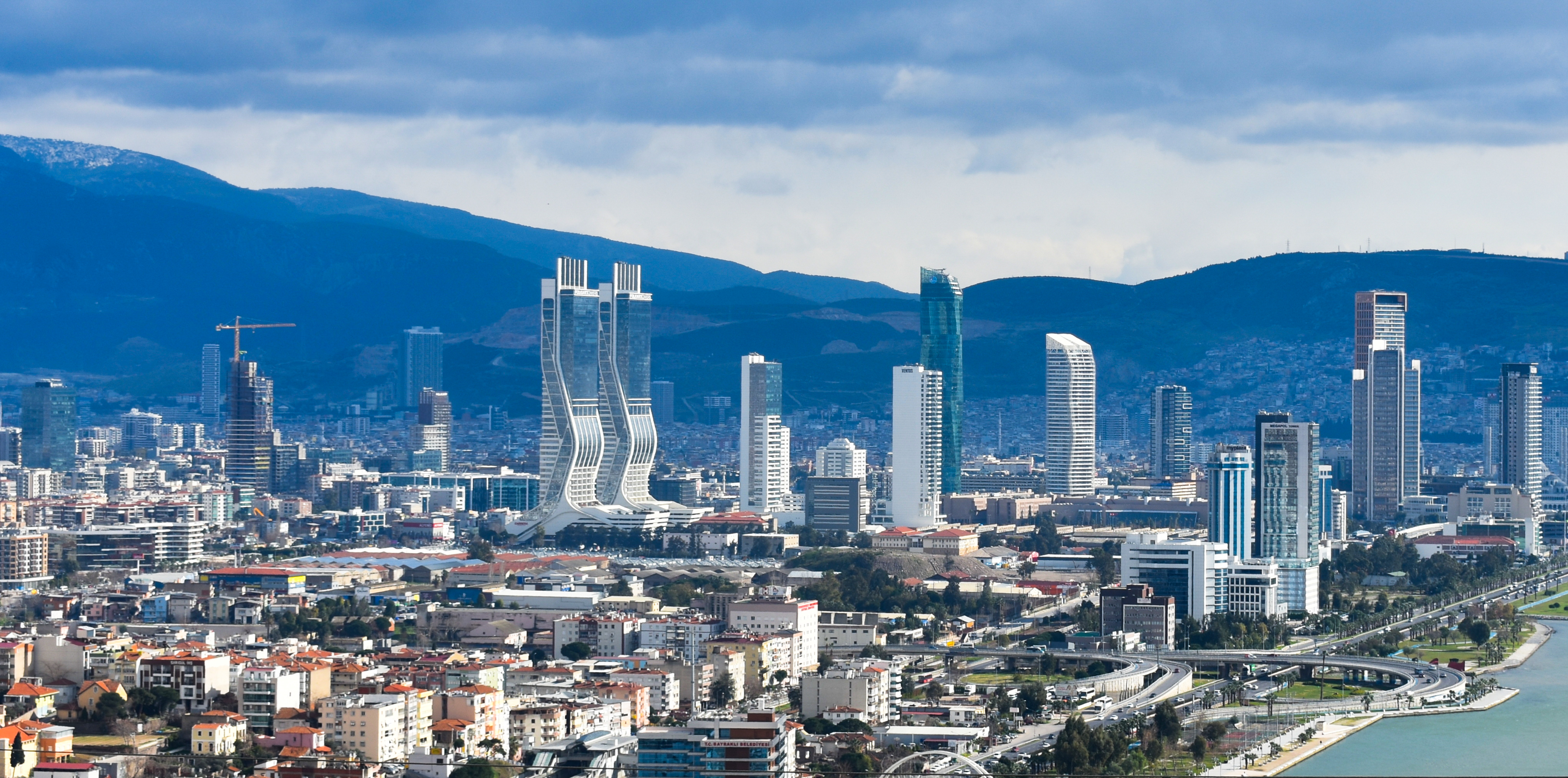
Mistral Towers in İzmir
