= İzmir Ethnography Museum =

Ethnographic museum in İzmir, Turkey

- İzmir Etnografya Müzesi
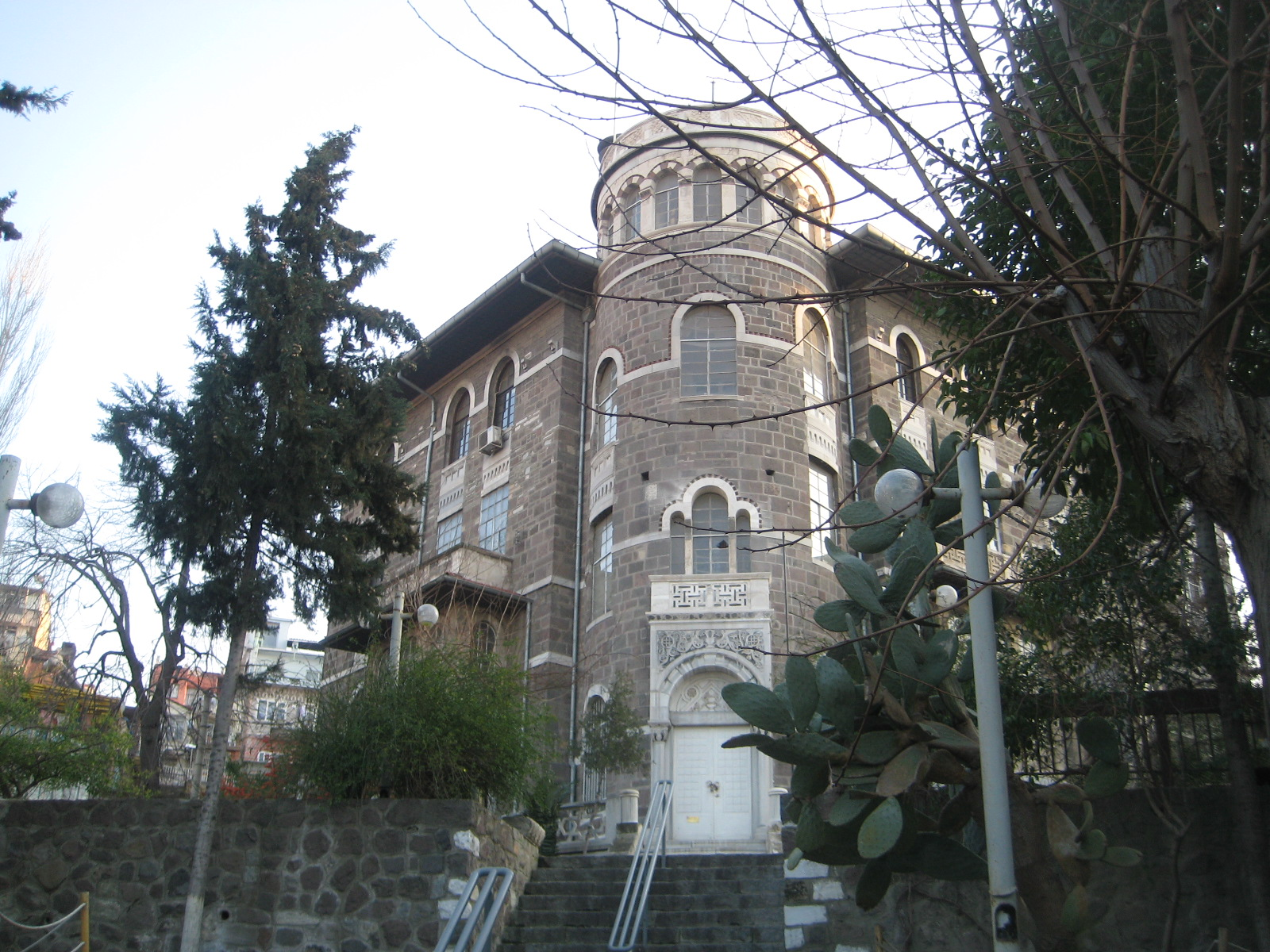
- Established: 1984
- Location: İzmir, Turkey
- Coordinates: 38°24′49.4″N 27°07′42.6″E
- Type: Ethnography

The İzmir Ethnography Museum (Turkish: İzmir Etnografya Müzesi) is an ethnography museum in İzmir, Turkey. It contains a number of pieces of clothing and pottery from the Seljuk period of Turkish history onwards. Admission to the museum is free.

The building that now houses the İzmir Ethnography Museum was originally built in 1831 to function as the St. Roche Hospital. The building is four stories high and is made of stone. The museum contain a beautiful collection of colorful displays, including dioramas, photos and information panels. These artifacts demonstrate the local arts, crafts and customs. Various sections in the museum portray subjects as wide-ranging and intriguing as camel wrestling, pottery, tin-plating and felt-making, embroidery. There are also various displays of weaponry, jewelry and a rich collection of illustrated manuscripts.

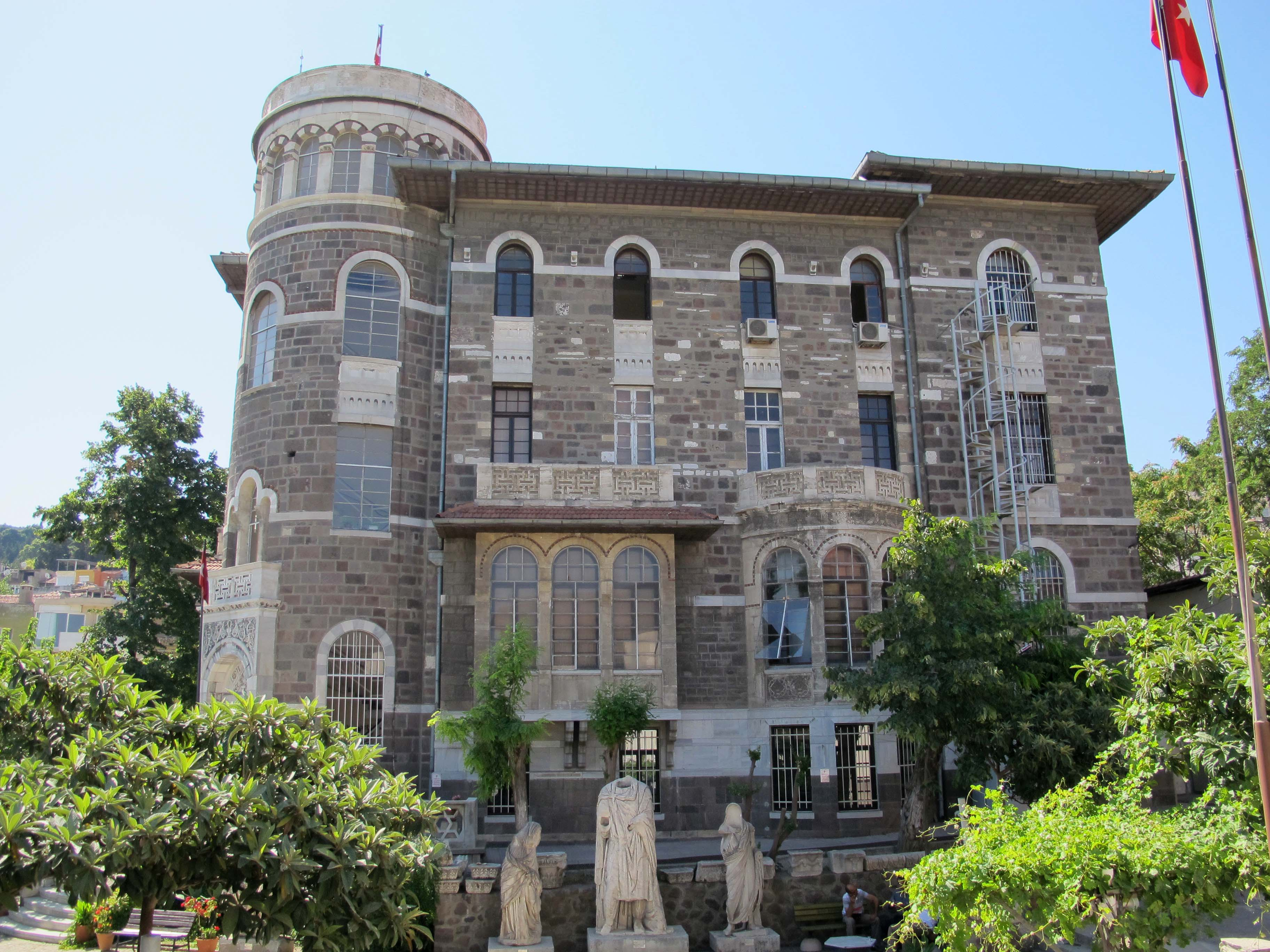
View from the east
