= Konak, İzmir =

Konak
- District and municipality
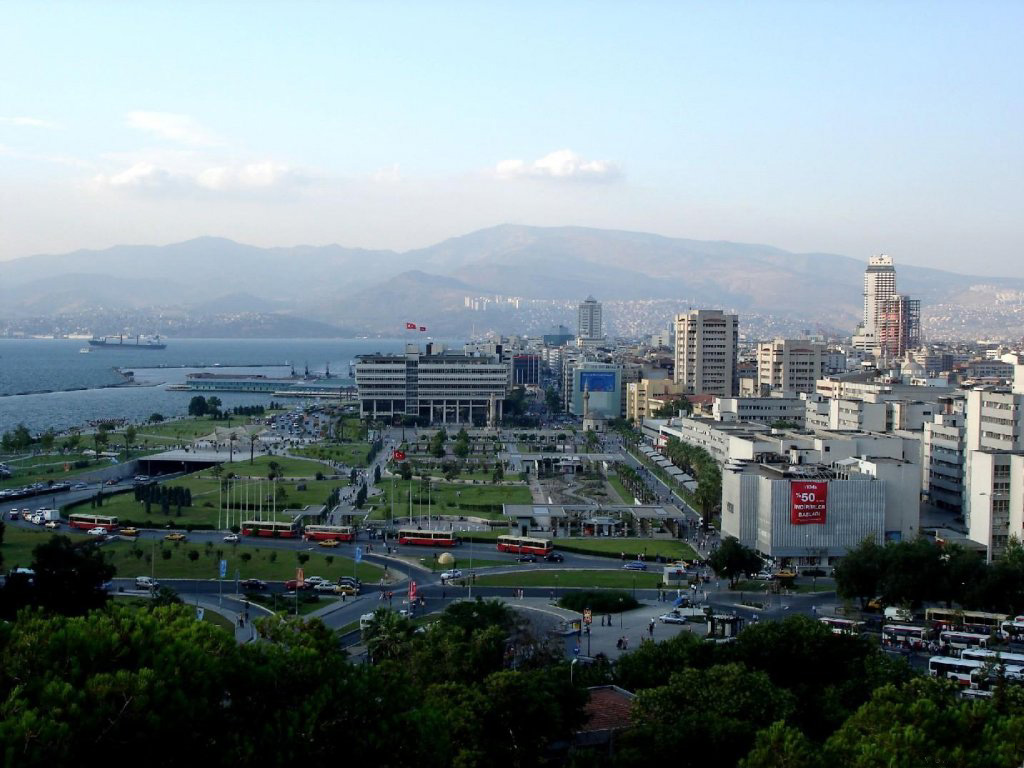
- Konak Square is a busy square at the southern end of Atatürk Avenue in the Konak district

- Map showing Konak District in İzmir Province

- Location within Turkey Location within İzmir
- Coordinates: 38°25′06″N 27°08′05″E
- Country: Turkey
- Province: İzmir

Government
  - Mayor: Nilüfer Çınarlı Mutlu (CHP)
- Area: 24 km^{2} (9.3 sq mi)
- Population (2022): 332,277
  - Density: 14,000/km^{2} (36,000/sq mi)
- Time zone: UTC+3 (TRT)
- Area code: 0232
- Website: www.konak.bel.tr

Konak is a municipality and district of İzmir Province, Turkey. Its area is 24 km^{2}, and its population is 332,277 (2022). It is the most densely populated of the thirty districts of İzmir, and has historically acted as the administrative and economic core of the city. Situated in an area that roughly corresponds to the geographic center of İzmir, Konak extends for 11.4 kilometres (7 miles) along the southern coastline of the Gulf of İzmir. Konak district area neighbors the district areas of Bornova to the east, Balçova to the west and Buca and Karabağlar to the south. Konak center is connected to other districts of İzmir and beyond by a dense network of roads and railroads, as well as by a subway line currently being largely extended and by ferry services to Karşıyaka. Konak is a very active hub of industry, trade, commerce and services, with the number of companies exceeding sixty thousand and its exports nearing two billion US dollars in 2006.

== Location and administration ==
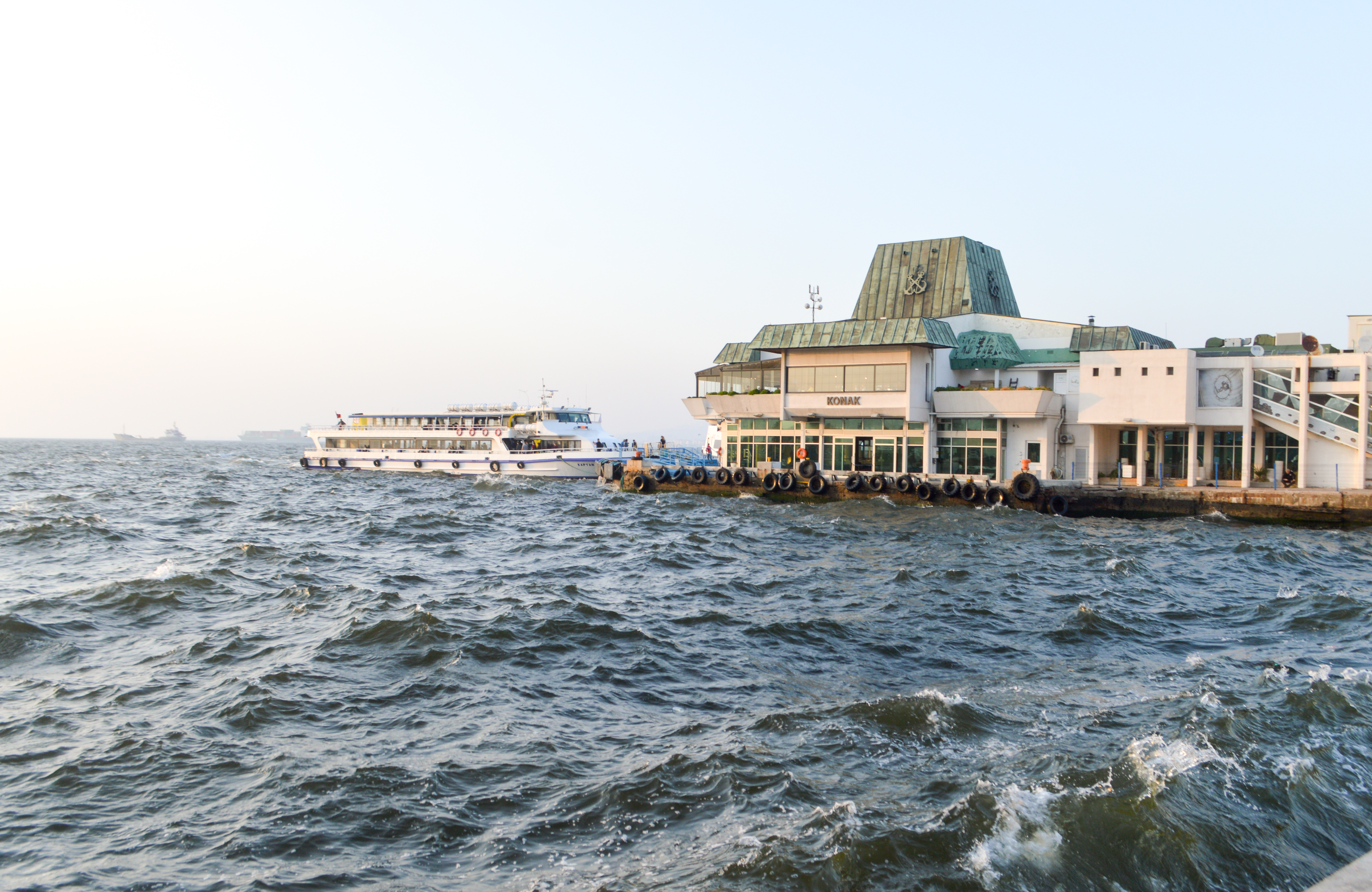
Ferry docked at Konak ferry terminal

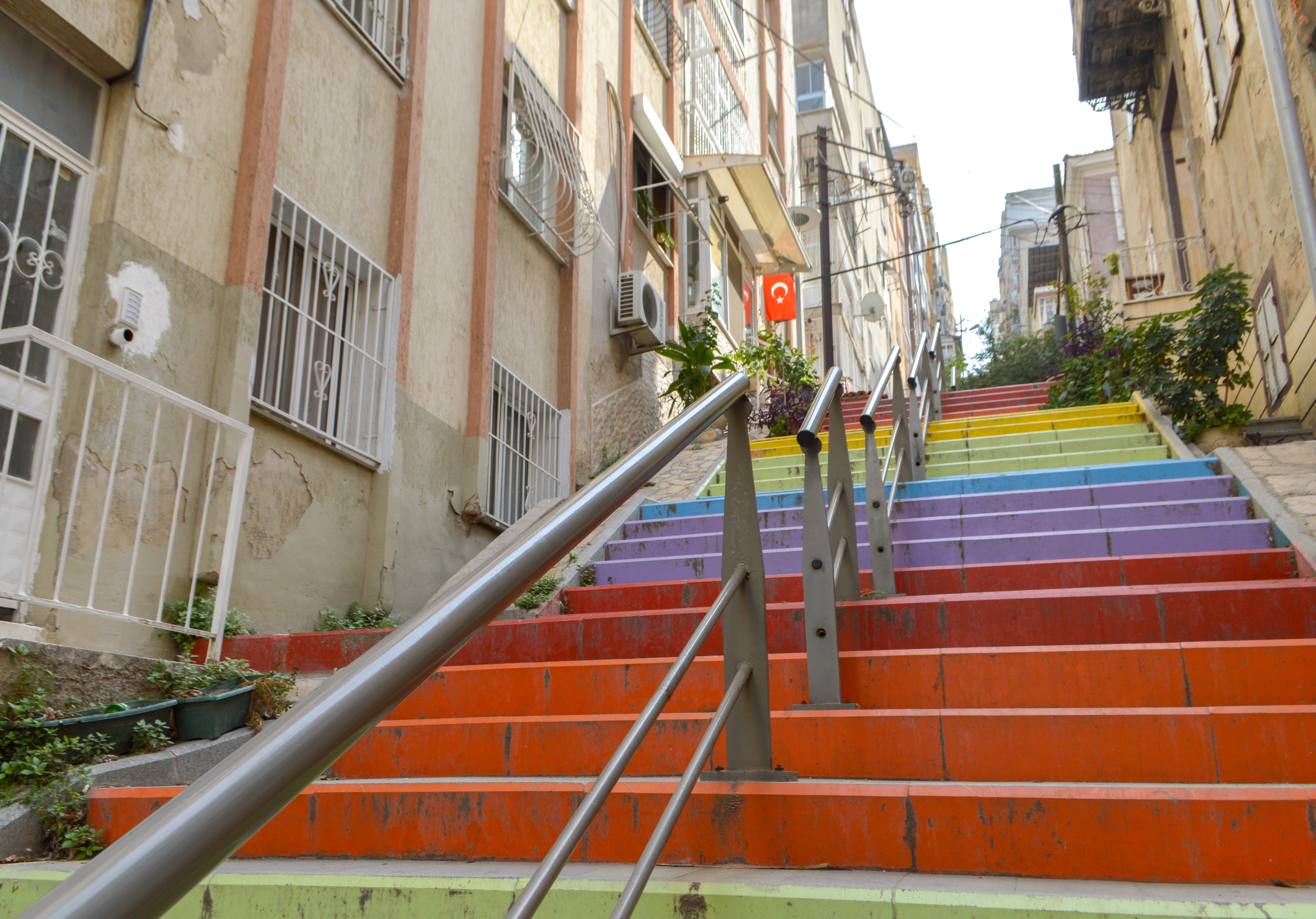
Colorful set of stairs in Karataş

The name "Konak" was previously used for İzmir's historic core neighborhood, as well as for its key central square (Konak Square – Konak Meydanı). For example, Karşıyaka along the opposing northern shore did not always consider itself as an integral part of İzmir, or in any case, had marking specificities and points of rivalry.

Administrative history of Konak started in 1983–1984 when the steps towards the constitution of a Metropolitan Municipality of İzmir, itself divided into districts, were taken. In 1987, the territory of former district of central İzmir of was renamed the district of Konak (with the exception of its former dependency of Buca, which was turned into a separate district), and the name İzmir implies the entire metropolitan area since then. The municipality of Konak came into effect in full terms in July 1988. The district of Karabağlar was created in 2008 from part of the district of Konak.

Konak district area starts at the tip of the Gulf of İzmir and follows the southern shoreline, covering such prominent neighborhoods of İzmir as, respectively from east to west, Alsancak with its international freight and passenger port, Konak Square proper and Kemeraltı and Çankaya bazaar areas and Kültürpark, where İzmir International Fair is held, immediately behind it, Karataş, the former Jewish neighborhood marked by Asansör building, and Göztepe, famous for its football team, among others, further along the coast towards the west, as well as the hillside zone behind these, notably the quarters of Eşrefpaşa and Hatay.

For both the metropolitan area and İzmir Province in general, Konak still represents the administrative nerve center, with the governorship, the offices of İzmir Metropolitan Municipality, the commercial areas, and other important administrative and private headquarters being situated within the boundaries of Konak.

The name konak itself means, inter alia, government house or official residence in Turkish and refers in the case of Konak, İzmir, to the residence built for the governor between 1869–1972 at the spot and as a replacement of the mansion of Katipzade, a family of notables who controlled the city and the region between 1750–1820. The new building was intended to emphasize the prestige acquired by a growing international trade center and its design and furnishings were consequently luxurious. The building marked the move for the seat of the vilayet of Aydın to İzmir, initiated in 1865.

In recent years, there is a move toward decentralization and shift also to other districts of İzmir by official and private headquarters, notably with the building of a new and huge Hall of Justice in Bornova.

== History ==
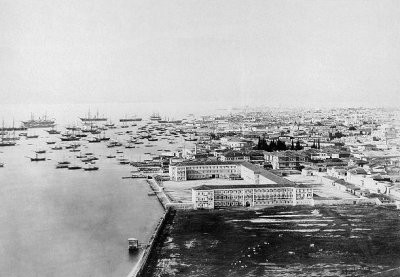
General view of Konak Square (1865), with the Ottoman casern Sarıkışla (the Yellow Casern) and the yet unused landfill in the foreground, and the governor's residence, the square and the ships at the quay in the background

The core areas of Konak Square and Kemeraltı were formed with the filling in due course during the 17th century of the shallow inner bay of İzmir and immediate outer coastal reaches. Kemeraltı bazaar came into existence with the filling between 1650–1670 of the shallowest parts of the bay and the process of gaining ground from the sea bay was pursued progressively. The shoreline took its present form by the end of the 18th century in approximate terms, although some of the land along the berth remained unused till the mid-19th century. In 1829, Sarı Kışla, the Yellow Casern, the principal Ottoman casern of the city, gigantic for its time, was built at immediate sea-side, and a private residence (konak) situated slightly diagonally behind the casern was extended and converted into the governor's mansion, demarcating Konak Square that holds its name from the mansion, and which in its turn gave the name to the central metropolitan district of İzmir (Konak), and at the level of which Kemeraltı is considered to start.

The Yellow Casern was demolished in 1955 under express instructions from the then Prime Minister Adnan Menderes, who wanted to see Konak Square re-shaped, to the continuing regret of many Smyrniots who had come to adopt the oversize building as one of the main landmarks of their city. Konak Square is still where the best symbols of İzmir are found.

== Economy and education ==
The number of companies registered in Konak district was 58,199 in 2006. Exports realized by the district's companies reached 1,824,101,418 the same year. 26 banks are present across Konak district area and they provide services through 209 branches. Roughly 304,000 residential buildings make up Konak's settlement. It is notable to observe that, according to the figures provided by the prefecture, residential areas make up only around 10–15 per cent of Konak's urban zone, while a huge proportion of 75–80 per cent is classified as land being used for commercial and/or industrial purposes.

The literacy rate is close to hundred per cent, a minimal two per cent ratio of illiteracy accounted for principally by new immigrants to the district. There are 23 students for each teacher, and 2,085 patients for each doctor in Konak. While İzmir's universities mostly have their campuses in other districts of the metropolitan area, these preserve an important presence in Konak through their administrative buildings and depending educational institutions, and some among the higher education establishments of fresher date chose Konak as initial base. Konak is also home to a number of deep-rooted high schools well known across Turkey.

=== Business centers ===
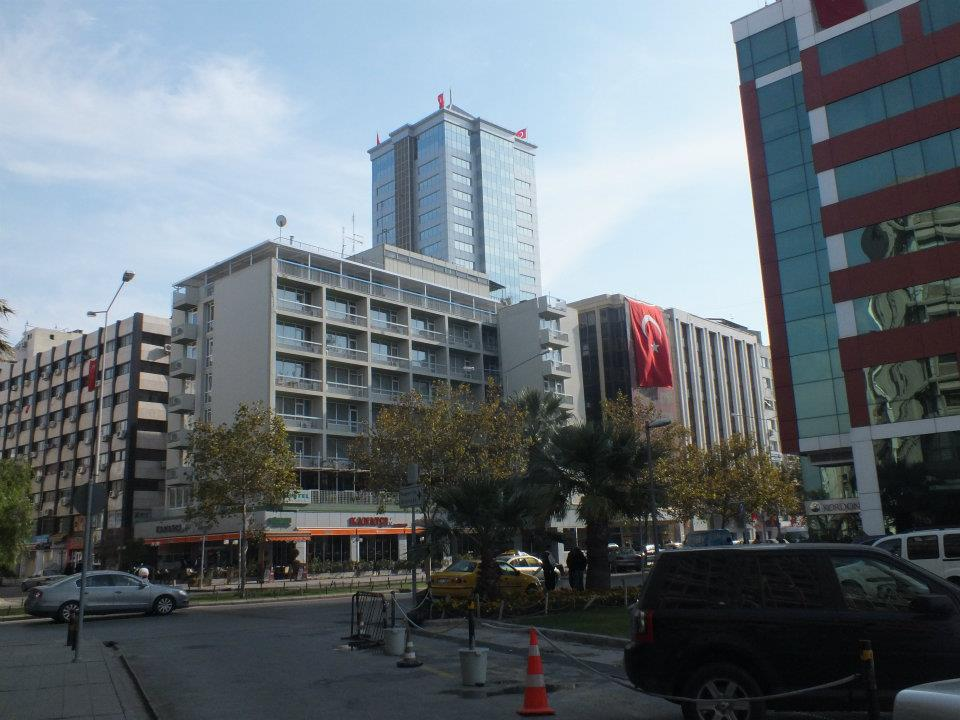
Heris Tower viewed from Cumhuriyet Boulevard.

Heris Tower
- Heris Kulesi
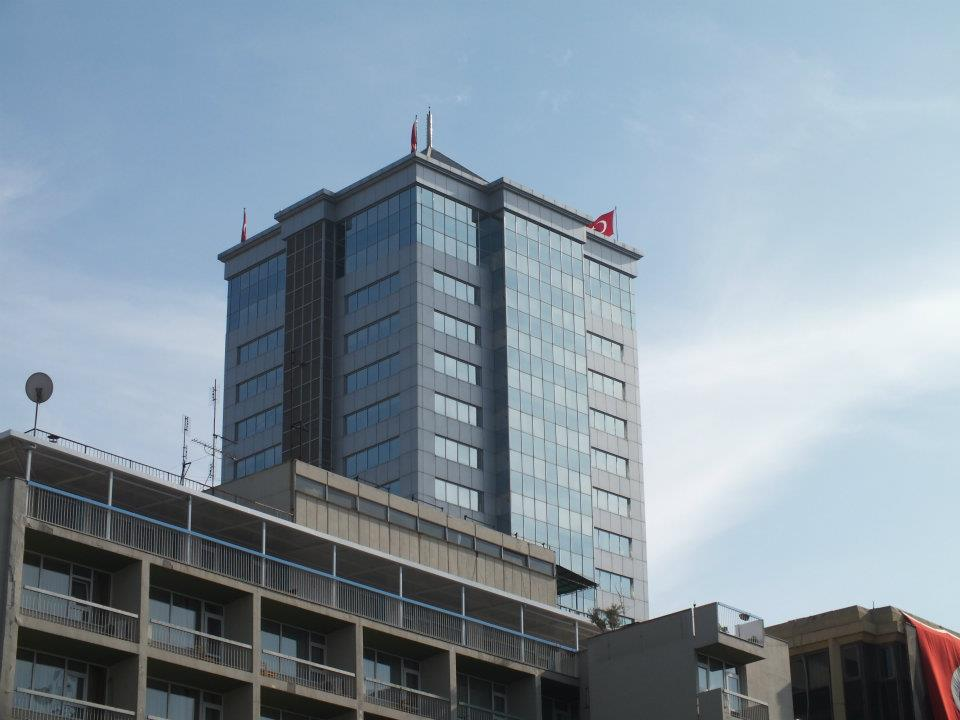
- Heris Tower, viewed from the northwest.
- Interactive map of the Heris Tower area
- Alternative names: Heris Business Center

General information
- Status: Completed
- Type: Office
- Architectural style: Postmodern
- Location: Şehit Fethi Bey Cad. No: 55, Akdeniz Mah. 35210, İzmir, Turkey
- Coordinates: 38°25′08″N 27°07′43″E

Height
- Height: 124 m (407 ft)

Technical details
- Floor count: 26

The district is the home of some large business centers including Heris Tower, Birsel Plaza, Kavala Plaza and Arkas Building. Of İzmir largest business plazas, Heris Tower is the largest as of 2004 with 600 people working there. Heris Tower was one of the tallest building of İzmir and as of 2014 it was still one of only 9 high-rise buildings in İzmir. And as of mid 2021 was still the 15th tallest building in İzmir. Heris Tower (Turkish: Heris Kulesi) is a 124 m (407 ft) tall office skyscraper in İzmir, Turkey. in the commercial Akdeniz neighborhood on Şehit Fethi Bey Avenue, the building is the seventh tallest building in İzmir and the 99th tallest building in Turkey. Heris Tower was completed in 2001 and was the second tallest building in the city on completion. With a blue pyramid at the tip, Heris Tower shares a resemblance with the Mellon Bank Building in Philadelphia, Pennsylvania.

== Composition ==
There are 113 neighbourhoods in Konak District:

- 26 Ağustos
- Akarcalı
- Akdeniz
- Akın Simav
- Akıncı
- Ali Reis
- Alsancak
- Altay
- Altınordu
- Altıntaş
- Anadolu
- Atamer
- Atilla
- Aziziye
- Ballıkuyu
- Barbaros
- Birinci Kadriye
- Boğaziçi
- Bozkurt
- Çahabey
- Çankaya
- Cengiz Topel
- Çimentepe
- Çınarlı
- Çınartepe
- Dayıemir
- Dolaplıkuyu
- Duatepe
- Ege
- Emirsultan
- Etiler
- Faikpaşa
- Fatih
- Ferahlı
- Fevzipaşa
- Göztepe
- Güneş
- Güneşli
- Güney
- Güngör
- Güzelyalı
- Güzelyurt
- Halkapınar
- Hasan Özdemir
- Hilal
- Hurşidiye
- Huzur
- İkinci Kadriye
- İmariye
- İsmet Kaptan
- İsmetpaşa
- Kadifekale
- Kahramanlar
- Kahramanmescit
- Kemalreis
- Kestelli
- Kılıçreis
- Kocakapı
- Kocatepe
- Konak
- Kosova
- Kubilay
- Küçükada
- Kültür
- Kurtuluş
- Lale
- Levent
- M. Ali Akman
- Mecidiye
- Mehmet Akif
- Mehtap
- Mersinli
- Millet
- Mimarsinan
- Mirali
- Mithatpaşa
- Murat
- Muratreis
- Namazgah
- Namık Kemal
- Odunkapı
- Oğuzlar
- Ondokuzmayıs
- Pazaryeri
- Pirireis
- Ş. Nedim Tuğaltay
- Sakarya
- Saygı
- Selçuk
- Sümer
- Suvari
- Tan
- Tınaztepe
- Trakya
- Turgut Reis
- Türkyılmaz
- Tuzcu
- Uğur
- Ülkü
- Ulubatlı
- Umurbey
- Vezirağa
- Yavuzselim
- Yeni
- Yenidoğan
- Yenigün
- Yenişehir
- Yeşildere
- Yeşiltepe
- Yıldız
- Zafertepe
- Zeybek
- Zeytinlik

== Main sights ==
=== Kadifekale ===
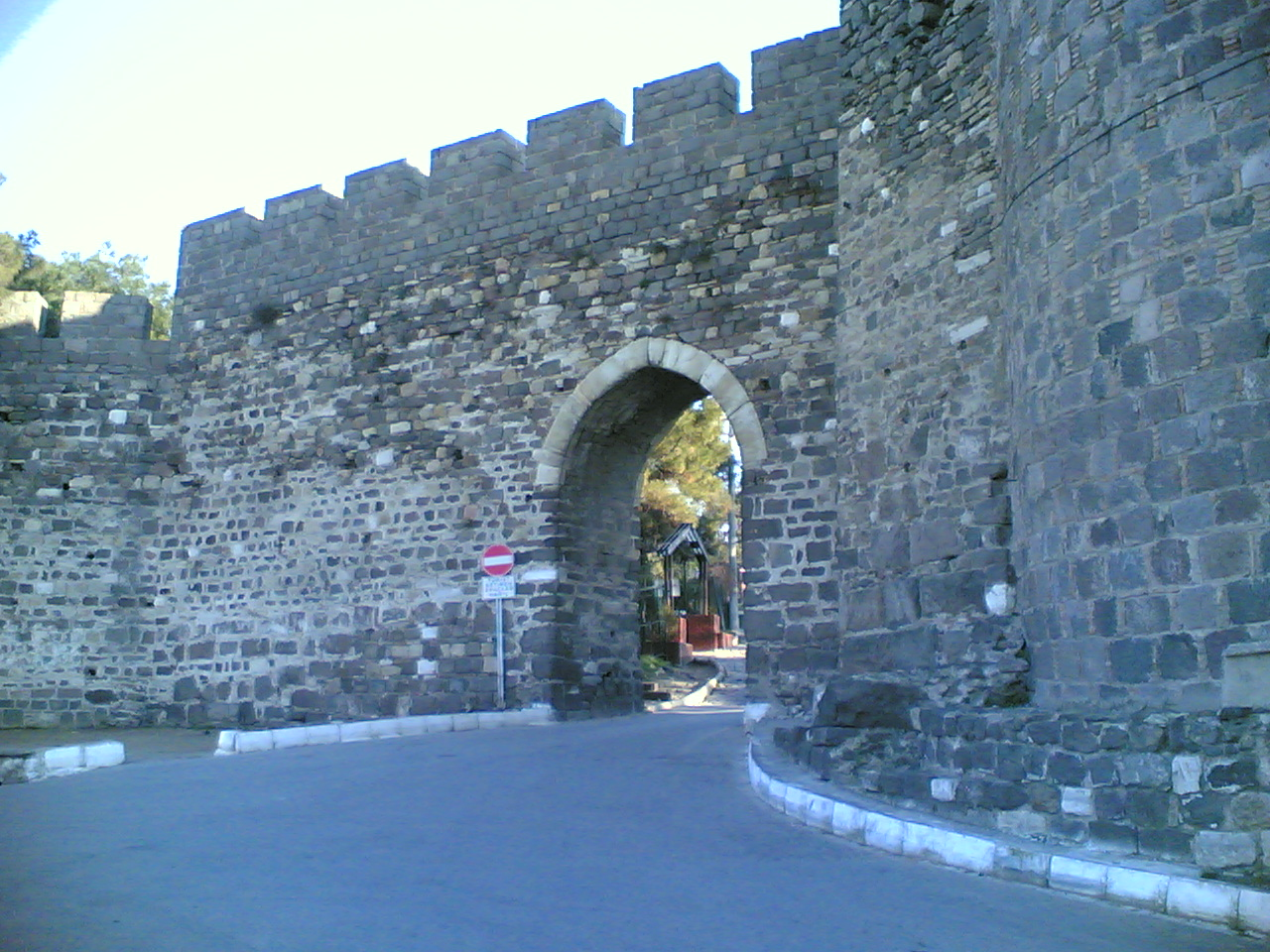
Entry of castle walls in Kadifekale.

Kadifekale, originally built at the end of the 4th century BC, is the millenary "Pagos" of ancient Greek and Byzantine times and "Pagus" of Roman and Genoese periods of İzmir. The Turkish name Kadifekale literally means "the velvet castle" and is used both for the castle and for the hill on whose summit the castle is situated. The summit is located at a distance of about 2 kilometres (1 mile) from the shoreline and commands a general view of a large part of the city of İzmir, as well as of the Gulf of İzmir.

=== Agora of Smyrna ===
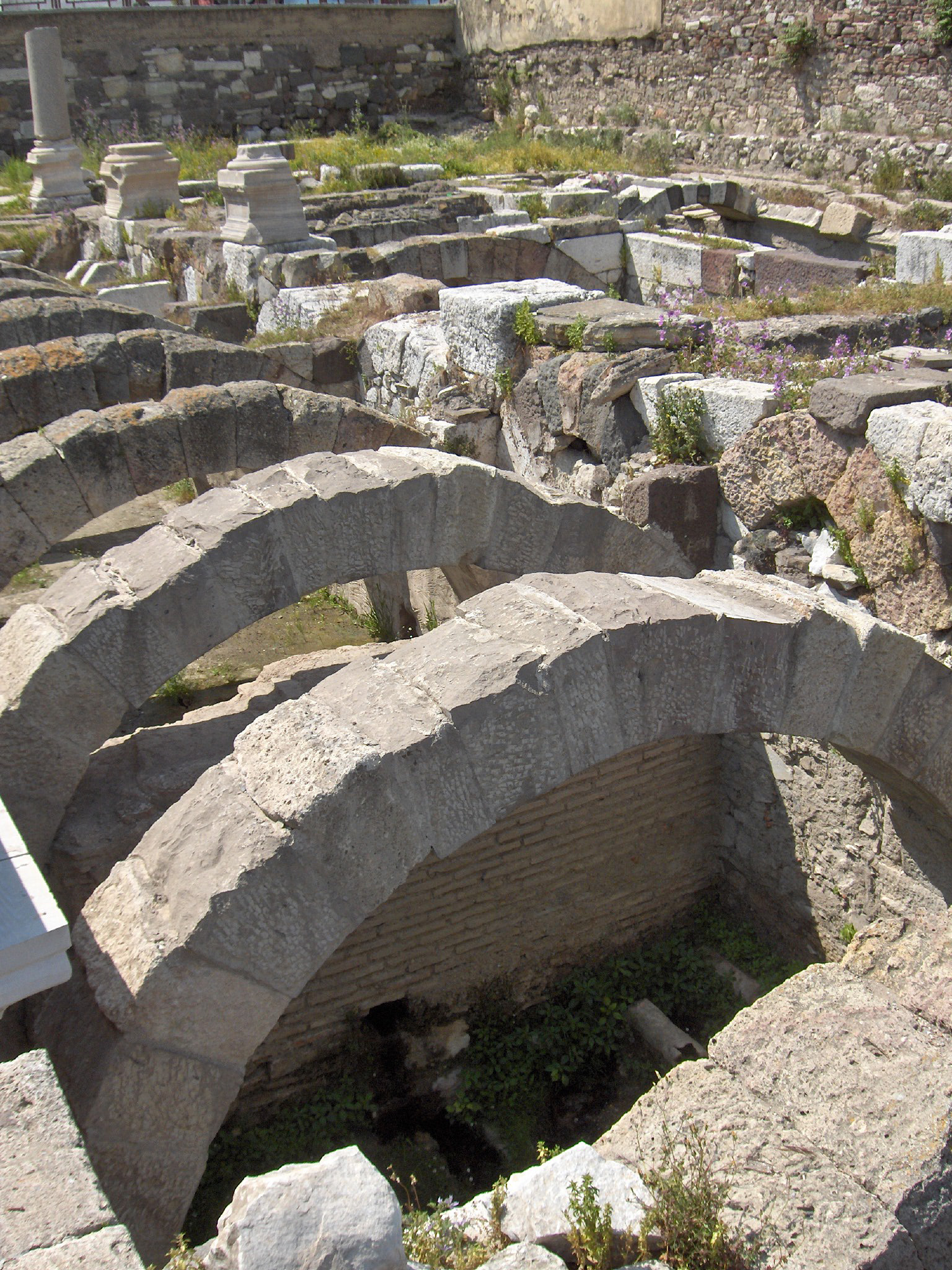
Section of the Agora

As is the case with Pagos hilltop castle at Kadifekale, the foundation of the second city of Smyrna to replace its Archaic Period predecessor at what is Bayraklı district today, is associated and contemporaneous with Alexander the Great, although the present-day remains date from later periods. In the case of ancient Smyrna, the ruins are centered around the Roman period Agora of the city, rebuilt after a 178 AD earthquake, although much evidence leads to the conclusion that further research could bring many other vestiges of the antique city to daylight. A new drive in the last decade, once the excavations were placed under the authority of İzmir's Metropolitan Municipal Administration, led to new acquisitions of land around the site of the Agora, incurring considerable expenses and with the objective of enlarging the area to explore.

First scientific explorations at the Agora of Smyrna were conducted by Charles Texier in late-1830s and the present state of the site as accessible to visitors is the consequence of the work accomplished between 1931 and 1942 by the archaeologists Rudolf Naumann and Selâhattin Kantar.

=== Konak Square and Kemeraltı (grand bazaar) ===
Konak Square is the central point where the structure that became İzmir city's symbol, İzmir Clock Tower, built upon decision of the city council by the Levantine French architect Raymond Charles Père on the occasion of Sultan Abdülhamid II's silver jubilee (1901), is found.

The tower is in front of İzmir Governor's official residence (Konak), an almost identical replica of the original building built between 1869 and 1872, which itself was lost to a fire in 1970. Between the two structures, the tower and the "konak", is a very small mosque, a curiosity today and which was formerly annexed by a medrese, which also dates from the time of the Katipzade, having been built around 1755.

The eastern end of Konak Square is marked by Konak Pier, a 19th-century construction whose steelworks are claimed to have been designed by Gustave Eiffel. The western end is the location of another 19th-century Levantine/European landmark of the city (see below), İzmir Ethnography and Archaeology Museum, originally built as an orphanage. The central part of the square, just next to the Clock Tower and the Governor's Mansion, leads access to Kemeraltı bazaar area and to the Agora of Smyrna beyond at the bazaar's land's end.

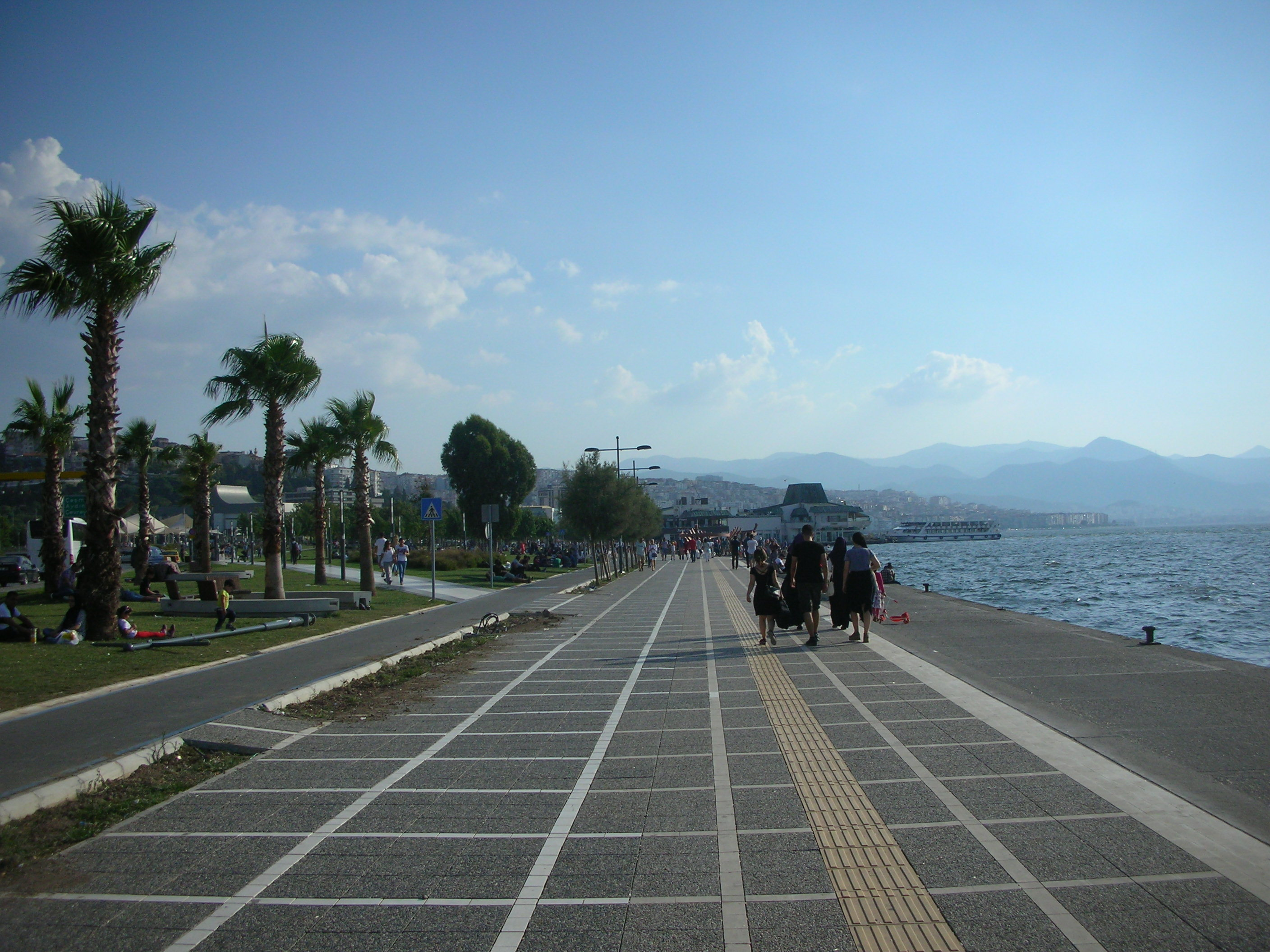
A view of Konak shore

Covering the area between Konak Square and the Agora of Smyrna, Kemeraltı Bazaar is a part of İzmir where residential buildings are practically absent and which consists, not on only of hundreds of commercial establishments but also of numerous religious buildings (historic mosques and synagogues) concentrated in walking distance from each other. İzmir center's two largest churches, a Catholic church dedicated to Polycarp and the Greek Orthodox church of "Aya Vukla", premises of the archaeological museum until recently and currently in phase of being restored, are also located slightly outside Kemeraltı zone. The entire area corresponds to İzmir's small inner bay which existed until the 18th century and is thus land gained from the sea. 1590-built Hisar Mosque and the 1744-built Kızlarağası led the pace for the establishment of a commercial zone here which is still marked by many buildings of İzmir's Ottoman period.

=== Kordon (seaside promenade) ===
Alsancak is a neighborhood of well-designed streets, modern apartment blocks and stores where İzmir's most expensive residences and commercial space are found alongside consulates. It extends along the First Kordon and the Second Kordon. The wharf (Pasaport Quay), as well as a 3,250 m-long (10,660 ft) combination of a landing stage, a tram line and an esplanade (Kordon) were built on reclaimed land from the sea which altered the overall image of the city.

Many restaurants, bars, cafes, discothèques and other entertainment venues are concentrated in Alsancak, increasingly within the intact rows of older and more traditional one- or two-storied buildings found in the inner smaller streets and are often restored specifically for the purpose of the intended commercial activity.

=== Asansör (elevator) ===
Asansör (Turkish for "elevator") is a building in Konak's Karataş neighborhood and it was built in 1907 as a work of public service by a wealthy Jewish banker and trader of that period, Nesim Levi Bayraklıoğlu, in order to ease passage for people and goods from the narrow coastline of Karataş to the hillside along its steep cliff. The small street that led to the building was recently renamed Darío Moreno in memory of the singer who used to live there before attaining fame in Europe.

=== Kültürpark ===
Kültürpark, behind Alsancak's coastal strait at a short distance, is considered the cradle of Turkey's fairs and expositions industry, and is notable for hosting a series of simultaneous festival activities.

== See also ==
- Dr. Selahattin Akçiçek Cultural Center
- Güzelyalı Bridge
- Timeline of İzmir
