= Transport in İzmir =

İzmir is a transportation hub for western Anatolia. İzmir has an extensive bus system, a developing metro, commuter rail system and a large urban ferry network. The city has highways connecting it to Çeşme, Menemen, Istanbul, Bursa, Aydın and Denizli as well as a beltway. Mass transportation is operated by four separate public agencies all owned by the İzmir Municipality.

== Road transport ==
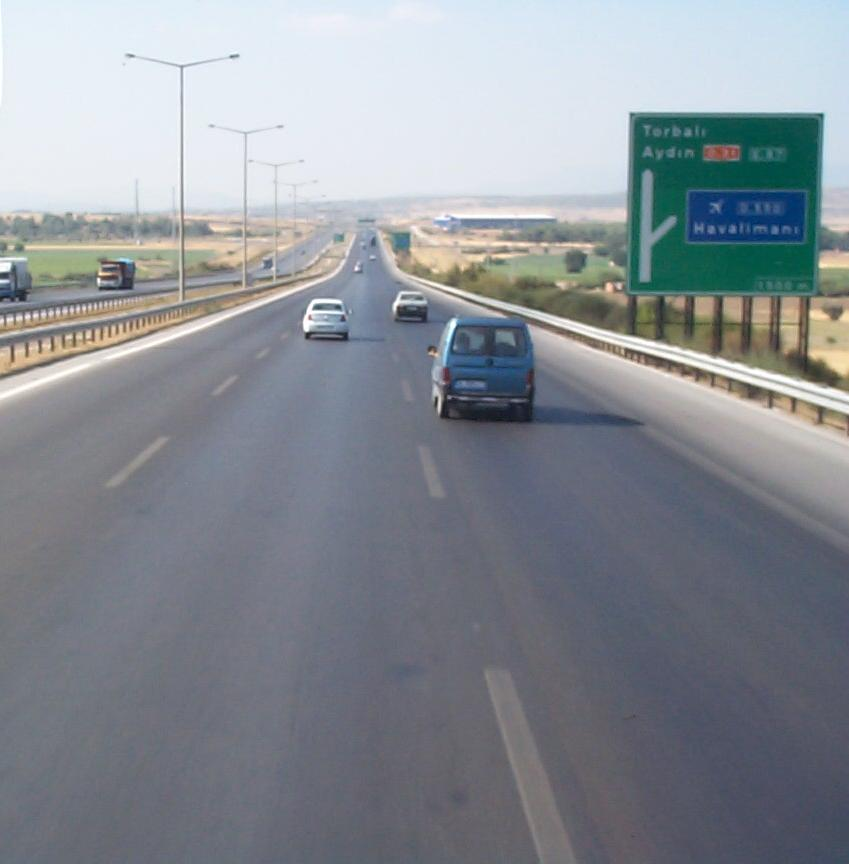
İzmir-Aydın Motorway

İzmir is a major hub in roadways in the Aegean Region of Turkey. İzmir is the hub of motorways in the region and also is connected to the European road network. (The İzmir Beltway), (İzmir-Aydın Motorway), the (İzmir-Çeşme Motorway), the (Northern Aegean Motorway),

and the (İzmir–Istanbul Motorway) are the 5 motorways that serve İzmir.

=== Motorways ===
- İzmir Çevre Yolu - Beltway of İzmir, linking Çiğli, northern Karşıyaka, Bayraklı, Bornova, Buca and Balçova.
- İzmir–Istanbul Otoyolu - To Gebze via Manisa, Balıkesir and Bursa. Connects to the O-22 in Bursa and O-4 in Gebze
- İzmir–Aydın Otoyolu - To Aydın via Torbalı and Selçuk. Connects to the O-30 in Buca.
- İzmir–Çeşme Otoyolu - To Çeşme via Narlıdere, Güzelbahçe and Urla. Connects to the O-30 in Balçova.
- Kuzey Ege Otoyolu - To Çandarlı via Aliağa and Menemenç Connects to the O-30 in Menemen.

=== European Roads ===
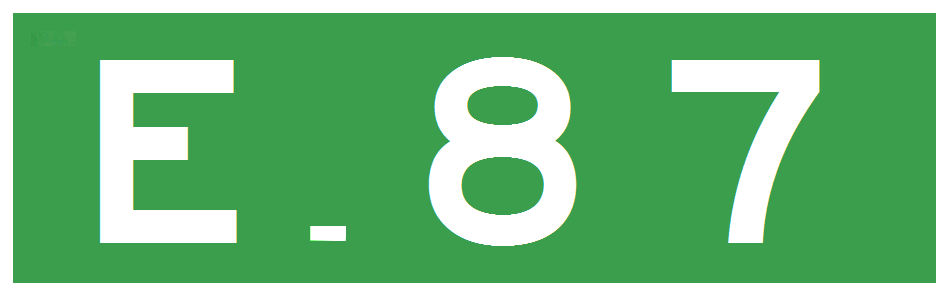
- - South to Antalya via Aydın and Denizli. North to Odesa via Gelibolu, Kırklareli, Burgas, Varna and Constanța.
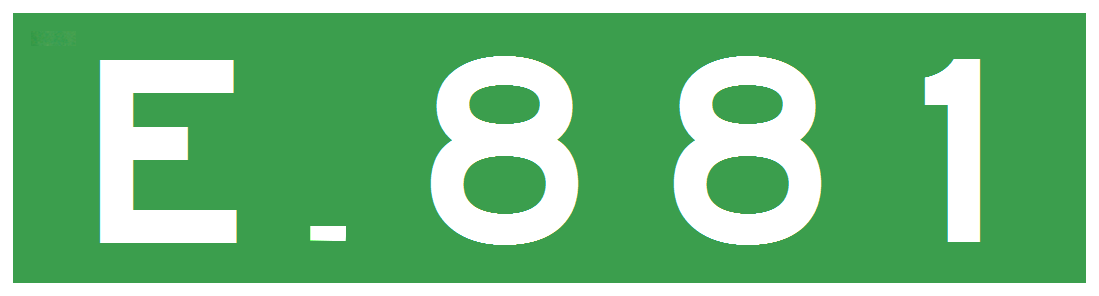
- - Northeast to İzmit via Manisa, Balıkesir and Bursa.
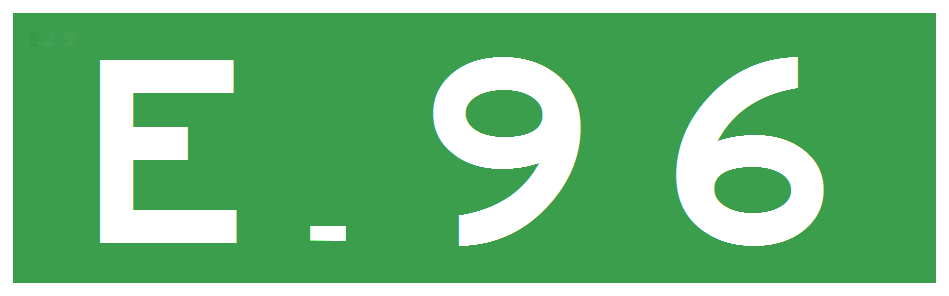
- - East to Sivrihisar via Uşak and Afyonkarahisar.

=== State Roads ===
- D.550 - North to Edirne via Edremit and Çanakkale. South to Muğla via Aydın.
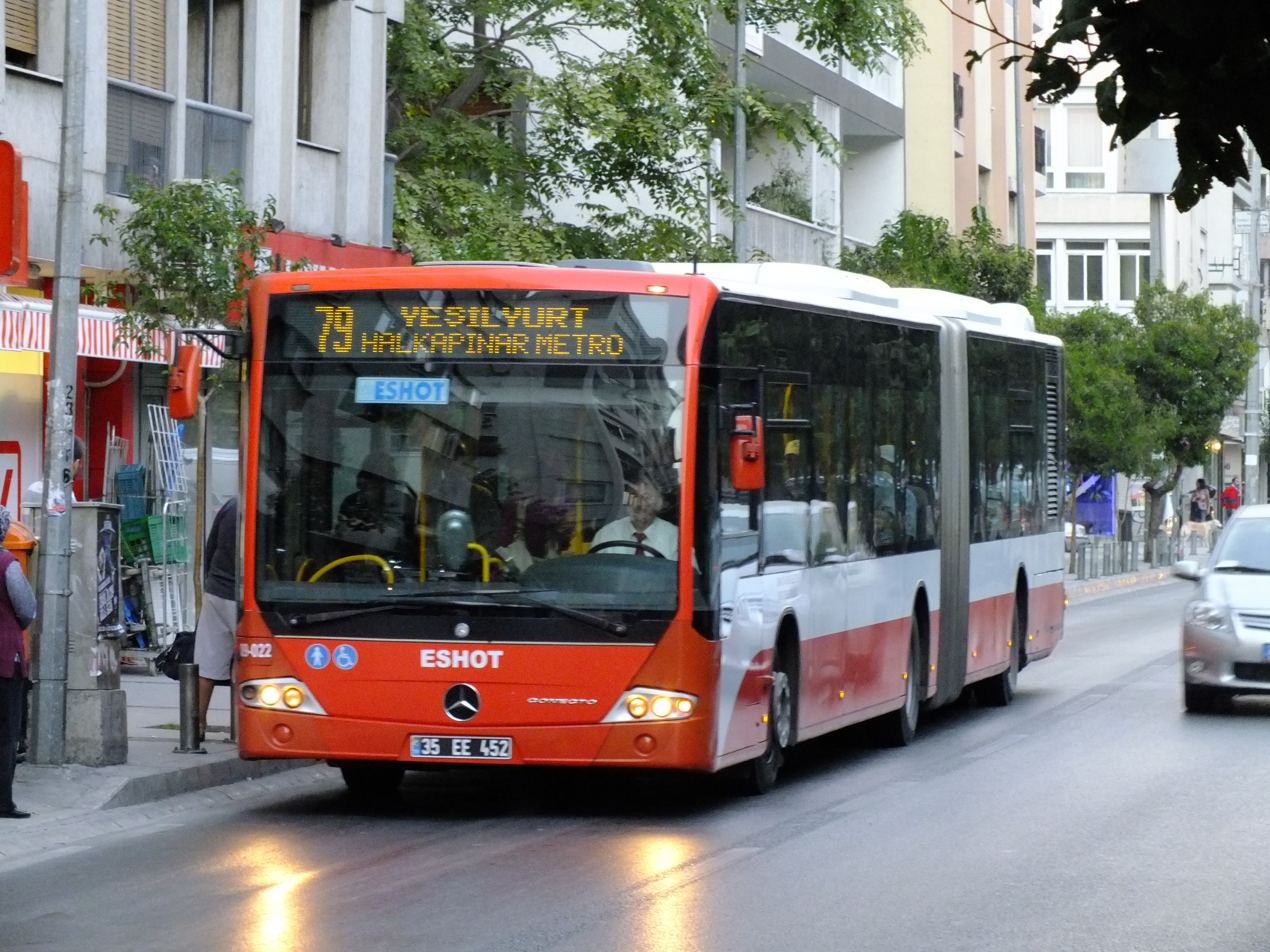
  An ESHOT bus in central İzmir
  D.565 - North to Bandırma via Manisa, and Balıkhesir.
- D.300 - East to Van via Uşak, Afyonkarahisar, Konya, Aksaray, Nevşehir, Kayseri, Malatya, Elazığ, Bingöl, Muş and Bitlis. West to Çeşme.

=== Buses ===
ESHOT, along with its subsidiary İZULAŞ are the two main bus transit service in İzmir. Buses serve all districts, however, denser network presence attained in the central area. ESHOT is owned by the İzmir Metropolitan Mucicipality (İBB). Also there is an intercity bus terminal in Bornova with many daily buses to all around Turkey.

== Rail transport ==
İzmir was the start of the oldest railway in Anatolia; The İzmir-Aydın Railway. The city is also a rail hub and the headquarters of District 3 of the Turkish State Railways is housed in Alsancak Terminal. İzmir also has the Turkey's largest commuter railroad; İZBAN, which carries an average 100,000 passengers daily. The İzmir Metro is a developing Rapid Transit system, opened in 2000. The railroad junction in Hilal is the only crisscross junction in Turkey, between two main lines.

=== Intercity and Regional Rail ===
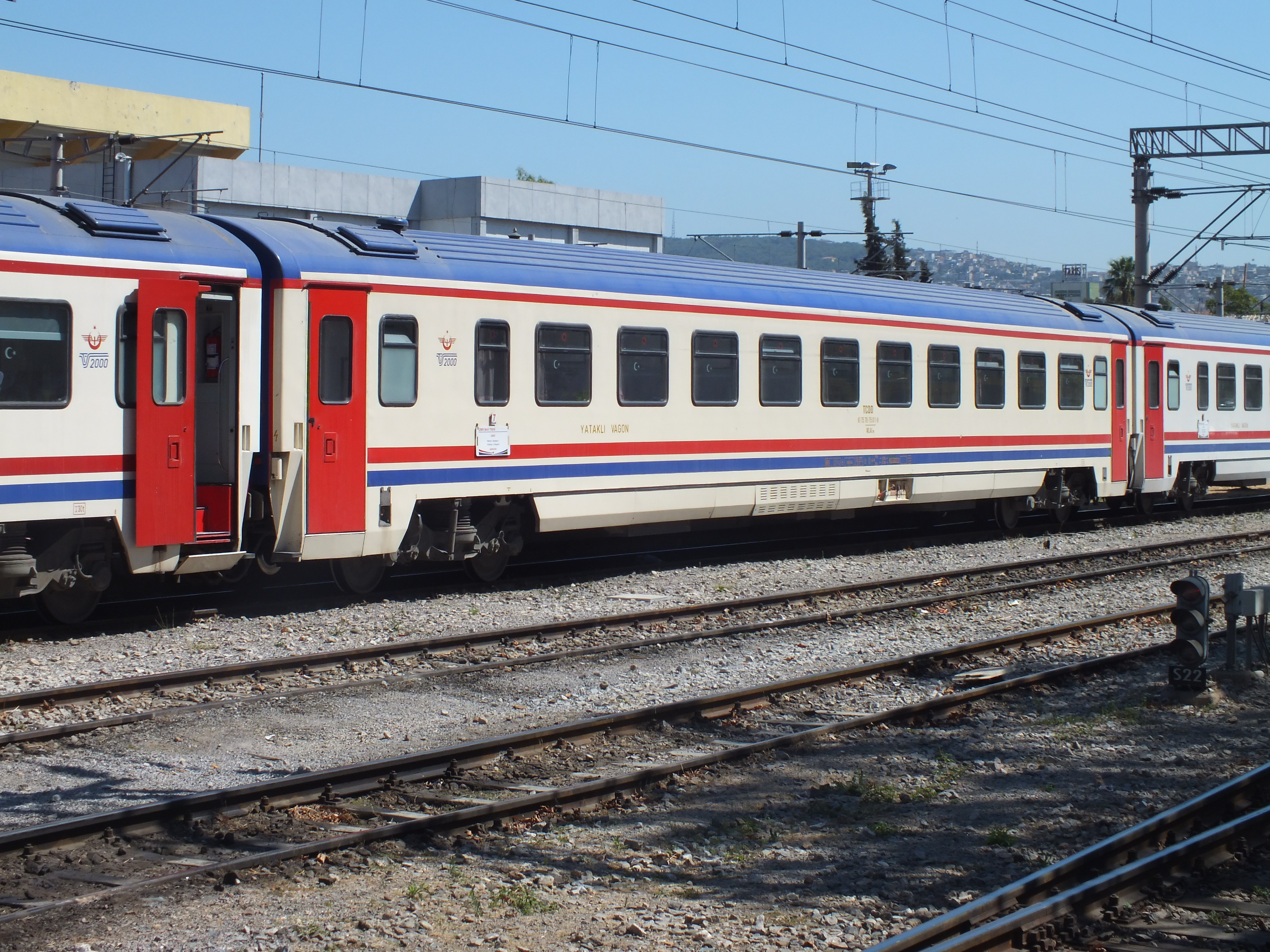
TCDD intercity carriages at Alsancak

The Turkish State Railways operates intercity and regional rail services to and from İzmir. Like Istanbul, İzmir has two main railway stations. Alsancak Terminal and Basmane Terminal. Basmane station services frequent regional train service to the south and southeast of the İzmir Province and mainline trains to Ankara, Bandırma and Afyon as well as regional service to Uşak. Alsancak used to be the main intercity terminal of Izmir, but as of 2023, it is only served by IZBAN trains.

Four mainline trains service İzmir. The İzmir Blue Train and Karesi Express are overnight trains running daily to Ankara, via Manisa–Balıkesir–Kütahya and Eskişehir. The 6th of September Express and the 17th of September Express are fast daily trains to Bandırma, with İDO connections to Istanbul. A daily regional train to Uşak, via Manisa operates from Alsancak. Regional train service to the Aydın Province and southern İzmir Province operate from Basmane station. Turkey's third busiest regional corridor; the İzmir-Ödemiş corridor starts at Basmane station. 7 daily trains operate to and from Ödemiş. A daily regional train to Aydın, 4 daily to Nazilli (via Aydın) and 2 daily trains to Tire operate as well as a daily train to Söke.

=== İZBAN Commuter Rail ===
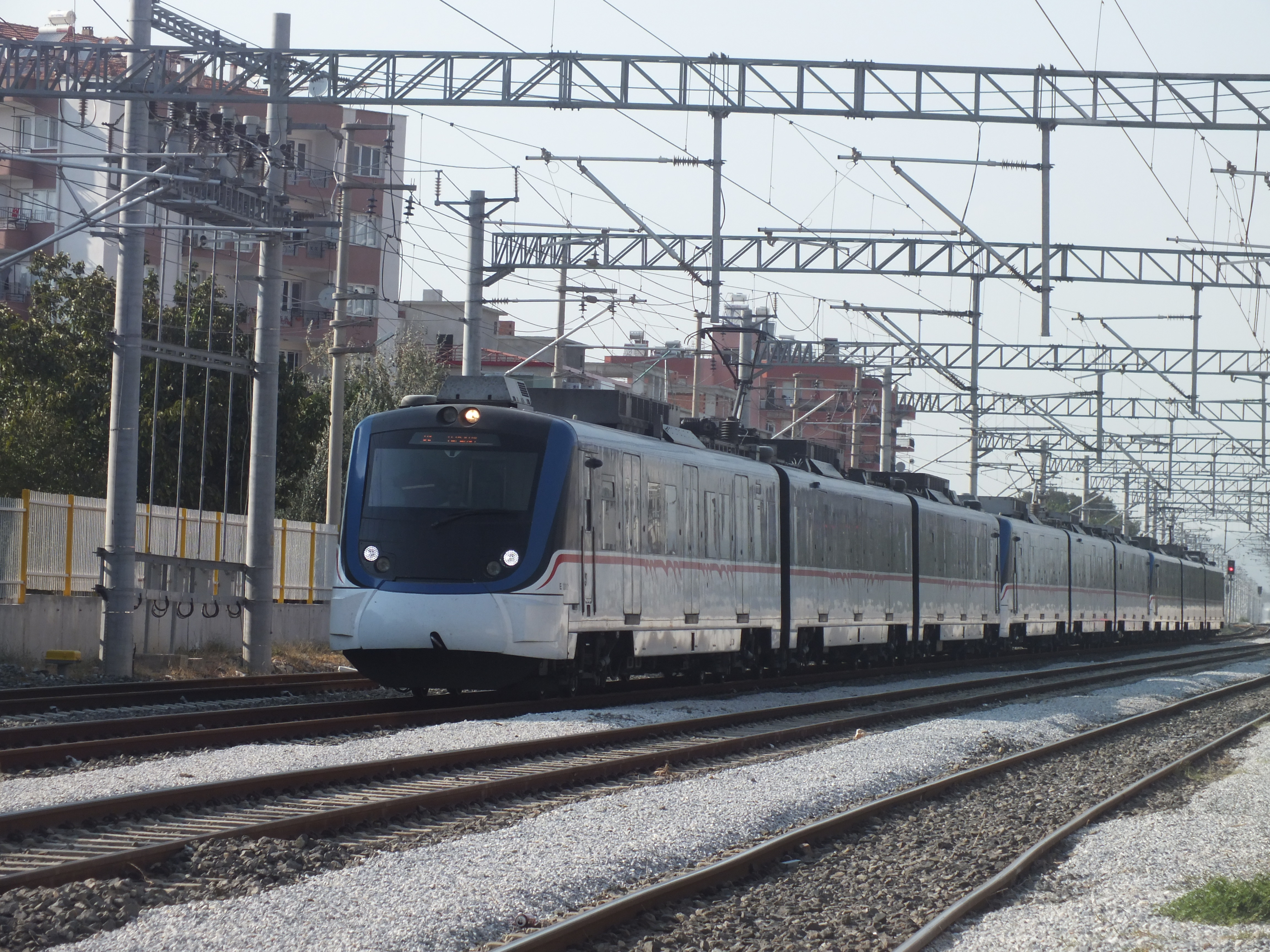
A İzban train approaching Torbalı

İZBAN, short for İzmir Banliyö, operates commuter rail service from Alsancak station to Aliağa, via Bayraklı, Karşıyaka, Çiğli and Menemen and Cumaovası via Şirinyer and Gaziemir. İZBAN started operation on August 30, 2010, and since has carried 840 million people, making it one of the fastest growing commuter railroads in the world. İZBAN operates 164 daily trains between Cumaovası and Aliağa. İZBAN is also the busiest commuter rail system in Turkey, being slightly more busy than Marmaray. The railroad has been extended to Selçuk and Torbalı, and is planned to be expanded to Bergama.

Line	Total Stations	Terminal
Northern Line	20	Aliağa
Southern Line	21	Selçuk

=== Metro ===
The İzmir Metro is a developing rapid transit system with the M1 line currently running from Narlıdere Kaymakamlık, through Konak to Evka-3. The under construction M2 line will run between Tınaztepe and Üçyol.

=== Tram ===
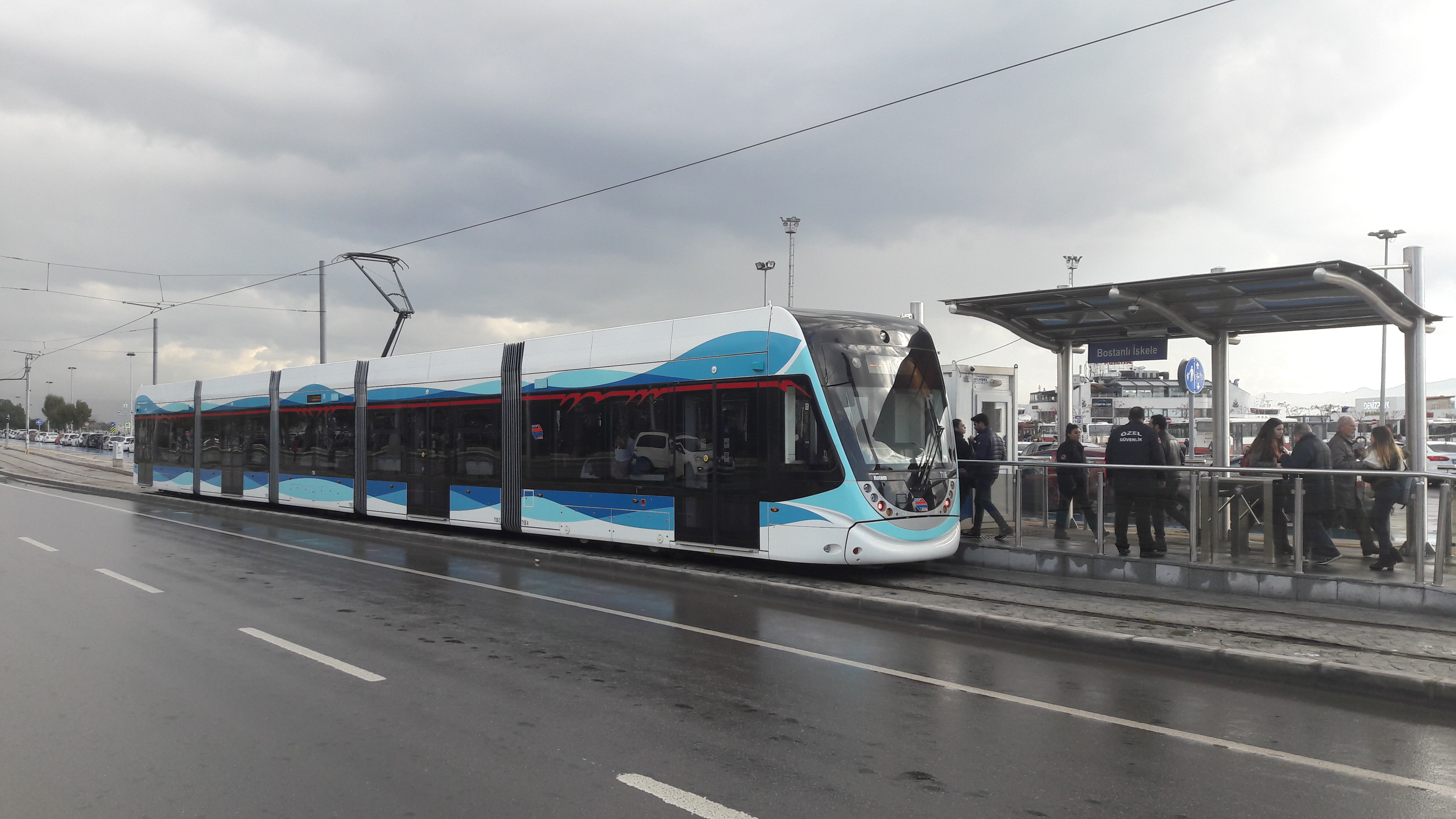
Tram at Bostanlı iskele

Tram İzmir is a tram network in İzmir, Turkey. Owned by the İzmir Metropolitan Municipality and operated by İzmir Metro A.Ş., the system consists of three separate lines: one in Karşıyaka, which opened on April 11, 2017, in Konak, which opened on March 24, 2018 and the other in Çiğli, which opened on January 27, 2024.

The operating system length consists of 33.6 km (20.9 mi) and 47 stations.

== Aviation ==
There are two major airports in İzmir, the Çiğli Air Base (IATA: IGL, ICAO: LTBL) and the Adnan Menderes International Airport (IATA: ADB, ICAO: LTBJ). Adnan Menderes Airport is located 18 km (11 mi) southwest of the city center in the Gaziemir district . Adnan Menderes Airport replaced Çiğli Air Base in the 1980s as the city's civil airport. Çiğli Air Base is now used only as a military base.

In 2017, Adnan Menderes Airport served 12.8 million passengers, 10.5 million of which were domestic passengers. It has ranked 5th in terms of total passenger traffic (after Atatürk Airport, Antalya Airport, Sabiha Gökçen Airport and Esenboğa Airport), and 4th in terms of domestic passenger traffic (after Atatürk Airport, Sabiha Gökçen Airport and Esenboğa Airport) within the country.

== See also ==
- ESHOT
- Trolleybuses in Izmir
