= State road D.300 (Turkey) =

Highway in Turkey

D.300

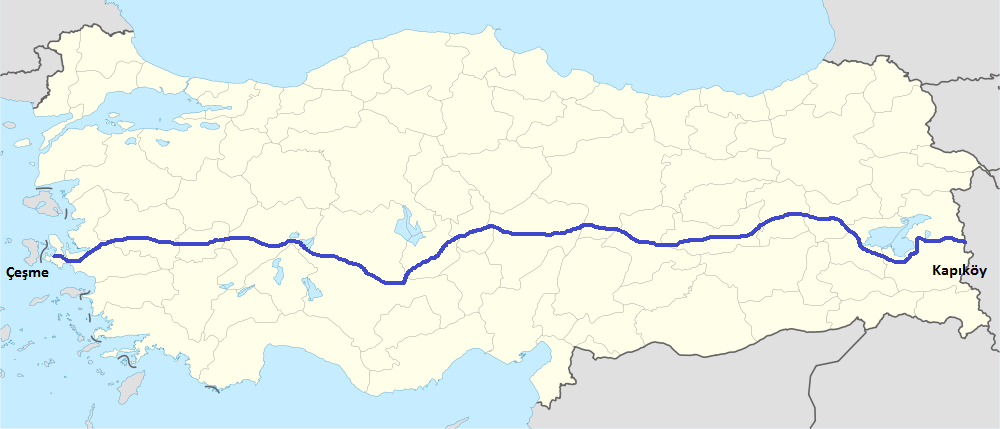

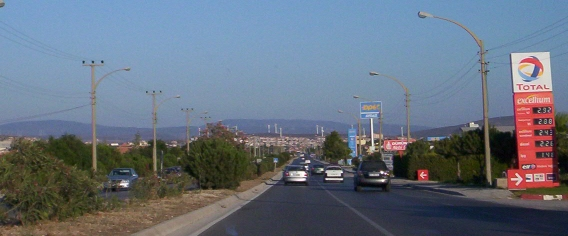

Route information
- Part of E96 / AH87
- Length: 2,004 km (1,245 mi)

Major junctions
- West end: Çeşme İzmir
- East end: Kapıköy Van

Location
- Country: Turkey

Highway system
- Highways in Turkey; Motorways; List; State Highways; List

D.300 is a major east–west state road spanning 2,004 km (1,245 mi) through central Turkey. The route begins in Çeşme, İzmir and runs east to Kapıköy, Van, on the Turkey-Iran border. The route connects several provincial capitals, including İzmir, Uşak, Afyon, Konya, Aksaray, Kayseri, Malatya, Elazığ, Muş and Van. The route is the second longest state highway in Turkey, after the D.400.

The D.300 is a four-lane highway for most of the route, except for two short sections toward the western end. The route becomes a controlled-access highway within İzmir.

== Main intersections ==
Province	District	km	mi	Exit	Destination	Notes
İzmir	Çeşme	0.0	0.0		2122. Sk.	
İzmir	Çeşme				O-32 — Çeşme, İzmir	
İzmir	Urla				O-32 — Çeşme, İzmir	
İzmir	Urla				D.505 — Karaburun	
İzmir	Urla				O-32 — Çeşme, İzmir	
İzmir	Urla				Urla connector — O-32	
İzmir	Güzelbahçe				Mithatpaşa Cd. — Balçova	
İzmir	Güzelbahçe				P.35-39 — Seferihisar	
İzmir	Güzelbahçe				Western end of Motorway	
İzmir	Güzelbahçe			K3	O-32 — Çeşme	Western end of concurrency with O-32
İzmir	Narlıdere			K2	Mithatpaşa Cd.	
İzmir	Balçova			K1	O-32 — Çeşme, Üçkuyular	Trumpet interchange
İzmir	Balçova			-	Fuat Köprülü Sk.	Northbound entrance and Southbound exit
İzmir	Balçova			Balçova Rest Area		
İzmir	Karabağlar			K2	Kütüphaneci Rasime Şeyhoğlu Sk.	
İzmir	Karabağlar			K3	Eski İzmir Cd.	
İzmir	Gaziemir			-	İzmir Fairground	Northbound exit
İzmir	Gaziemir			K4	O-30 — Menemen D.550 — Muğla	Eastern end of concurrency with O-30; southern end of concurrency with D.550
İzmir	Gaziemir			Eastern end of Motorway		
İzmir	Konak				P.35-63 — Konak	Konak tunnel
İzmir	Konak			Western end of Motorway		
İzmir	Konak				Gaziler Cd.	Eastbound entrance and exit, westbound entrance
İzmir	Konak				Mürselpaşa Blv.	
İzmir	Konak				Kamil Tunca Blv.	
İzmir	Konak				Liman Cd.	Eastbound entrance, westbound exit
İzmir	Konak				D.550 — Çanakkale	Northern end of concurrency with D.550
İzmir	Bornova				Manas Blv.	Westbound entrance
İzmir	Bornova				286 Sk. / 296 Sk.	Eastbound entrance and exit, westbound entrance
İzmir	Bornova				252 Sk. / Sakarya Cd.	
İzmir	Bornova				Ankara Cd. Service Rd.	
İzmir	Bornova				243 Sk.	Westbound exit
İzmir	Bornova				O-30 — Menemen	Eastbound exit, westbound entrance and exit
İzmir	Bornova				Üniversite Cd.	Eastbound exit
İzmir	Bornova				D.565 (İstanbul Cd.)	Eastbound exit, westbound entrance
İzmir	Bornova				Gençlik Cd.	Eastbound entrance and exit, westbound exit
İzmir	Bornova				Ankara Cd. Service Rd. — Otogar, O-5	Eastbound exit, westbound entrance and exit
İzmir	Bornova				Ankara Cd. Service Rd.	
İzmir	Bornova				Ankara Cd. Service Rd.	Eastbound entrance, westbound exit
İzmir	Bornova			Eastern end of Motorway		
İzmir	Kemalpaşa				P.35-25 — Kemalpaşa	
İzmir	Kemalpaşa				O-5 — İzmir	Kemalpaşa-Bursa section under construction.
Manisa	Turgutlu				D.250 — Menemen	
Manisa	Turgutlu				P.45-26 — Kemalpaşa	
Manisa	Salihli				P.45-28 — Sart Harabeleri	
Manisa	Salihli				P.45-27 — Sart	
Manisa	Salihli				D.585 — Simav	
Manisa	Salihli				D.585 — Akhisar D.585 — Sarayköy	
Manisa	Kula				P.45-32 — Gökçeören	
Manisa	Kula				P.45-34 — Alaşehir	
Manisa	Kula				P.45-35 — Eşme	
Manisa	Kula				P.45-33 — Simav	
Uşak	Uşak Merkez				P.64-33 — Eşme	
Uşak	Uşak Merkez				D.595 — Karamürsel	Western end of concurrency with D.595
Uşak	Uşak Merkez				P.64-50 — Ulubey	
Uşak	Uşak Merkez				D.595 — Kaklık	Eastern end of concurrency with D.595
Uşak	Banaz				P.64-27 — Yenierice	
Uşak	Banaz				P.64-01 — Sandıklı	
Uşak	Banaz				D.615 — Altıntaş	
Afyon	Sinanpaşa				P.03-76 — Dumlupınar	
Afyon	Sinanpaşa				P.03-57 — Sinanpaşa	
Afyon	Sinanpaşa				D.650 — Antalya	Western end of concurrency with D-650
Afyon	Afyonkarahisar				D.650 — Karasu	Eastern end of concurrency with D.650
Afyon	Afyonkarahisar				D.665 — Eskişehir	
Afyon	Afyonkarahisar				D.260 — Elazığ	
Afyon	Afyonkarahisar				P.03-26 — Şuhut	
Afyon	Afyonkarahisar				P.03-25 — Bolvadin	
Afyon	Çay				P.03-27 — Karaadilli	
Afyon	Çay				D.675 — Hamidye	Connects to D.200
Afyon	Sultandağı				P.03-28 — Sultandağı railway station	
Konya	Akşehir				P.42-84 — Yalvaç	
Konya	Akşehir				D.695 — Polatlı, Kızılot	
Konya	Akşehir				D.695 — Kızılot	
Konya	Akşehir				P.42-83 — Reis	
Konya	Ilgın				P.42-81 — Çukurkent	Connects to D.695
Konya	Ilgın				P.42-85 — Pazarkaya	Connects to D.695
Konya	Ilgın				P.42-78 — Yunuslar	Connects to D.330
Konya	Kadınhanı				P.42-92 (Kadınhanı Bltwy) — P.42-88	
Konya	Kadınhanı				P.42-88 (Kadınhanı Bltwy) — Altınöz	Connects to D.695
Konya	Sarayönü				P.42-02 — Sarayönü	
Konya	Selçuklu				P.42-75 — D.330	
Konya	Selçuklu				P.42-17 — D.715	
Konya	Selçuklu				D.330 — Beyşehir	Western end of concurrency with D.330
Konya	Selçuklu				D.715 — Silifke D.330 — Çakmak Bucağı	Eastern end of concurrency with D.330; southern end of concurrency with D.715
Konya	Selçuklu				D.715 — Kulu	Northern end of concurrency with D.715
Konya	Karatay				P.42-18 — Karaömerler	Unpaved road
Konya	Karatay				P.42-19 — D.330	Unpaved road
Aksaray	Eskil				P.68-77 — Eskil	
Aksaray	Eskil				P.68-82 — Karapınar	
Aksaray	Aksaray				P.68-51	
Aksaray	Aksaray				P.68-75 — Yeşilova	
Aksaray	Aksaray				D.750 — Tarsus	Western end of concurrency with D.750
Aksaray	Aksaray				D.750 — Zonguldak	Eastern end of concurrency with D.750
Aksaray	Aksaray				P.68-25 — Ihlara	
Nevşehir	Acıgöl				P.50-81 — Tuzköy	
Nevşehir	Nevşehir Merkez				P.50-51 — Güvercinlik	Connects to D.765
Nevşehir	Nevşehir Merkez				D.765 — İnebolu	
Nevşehir	Nevşehir Merkez				D.765 — Niğde D.302 — Ürgüp	
Nevşehir	Avanos				P.50-75 — Gülşehir	
Nevşehir	Avanos				P.50-01 — Kalaba	
Nevşehir	Ürgüp				D.302 — Ürgüp	

== Itinerary ==
Province	Location	Distance from Çeşme (km)	Distance from Çeşme (mile)	Distance from Kapıköy (km)	Distance from Kapıköy (mile)
İzmir
İzmir	Çeşme	0	0	2004	1245
İzmir	İzmir	90	56	1914	1189
Manisa
Manisa	Salihli	181	112	1823	1133
Manisa	Kula	254	158	1750	1087
Uşak	Uşak	302	188	1702	1058
Afyon	Afyon	417	259	1587	986
Konya
Konya	Akşehir	510	317	1494	928
Konya	Konya	641	398	1363	847
Aksaray	Aksaray	783	487	1221	759
Nevşehir	Nevşehir	856	532	1148	713
Kayseri
Kayseri	Kayseri	967	601	1037	644
Kayseri	Pınarbaşı	1069	664	935	581
Sivas	Gürün	1172	728	832	517
Malatya	Malatya	1321	821	683	424
Elazığ	Elazığ	1423	884	581	361
Bingöl	Bingöl	1568	974	436	271
Muş	Muş	1680	1044	324	201
Bitlis	Tatvan	1761	1094	243	151
Van
Van	Van	1903	1182	101	63
Van	Özalp	1964	56	40	25
Van	Kapıköy	2004	1245	0	0

== See also ==
- Kömürhan Bridge
