= Otoyol 30 =

Highway in Turkey

O-30
- İzmir Beltway; İzmir Çevreyolu

Route information
- Part of E87 E881
- Length: 60.2 km (37.4 mi)
- Existed: 1993–present

Major junctions
- South end: O-32 in Balçova, İzmir

- D.550 in Gaziemir; O-31 in Buca; O-5, D.300 in Bornova; D.550 in Çiğli; D.550 in Menemen

- North end: O-33 in Menemen, İzmir

Location
- Country: Turkey
- Regions: Aegean
- Provinces: İzmir Province
- Major cities: İzmir

Highway system
- Highways in Turkey; Motorways; List; State Highways; List
← O-22	→ O-31

Otoyol 30 (English: Motorway 30), also known as the İzmir Beltway (Turkish: İzmir Çevreyolu) and abbreviated as the O-30, is a 60.2 km (37.4 mi) long motorway that runs around the Gulf of İzmir from Balçova to Menemen. The motorway acts as a bypass for through-traffic around the city and connects to four other motorways; O-5, O-31, O-32 and O-33. For most of its route, the O-30 runs along the perimeter of İzmir, but enters urbanized areas in Balçova, Bornova, Karşıyaka and Çiğli. The entire motorway has six lanes (three in each direction) and is a part of the E87 and E881.

The first section of the O-30 opened to traffic in 1993 with the most recent section opened in 2008.

== History ==
Construction of the O-30 was started in 1988 in order to relieve traffic on the congested D-550, which was the only direct north–south road at the time. Along with relieving inner-city congestion, the O-30 was planned to be a connecting hub for two other motorways under construction at the time. The first section of the motorway was opened to traffic on 12 December 1993, between Karabağlar and Işıkkent. This 18 km (11 mi) long section provided an alternate route around the city from Gaziemir (south İzmir) to Bornova (east İzmir) as well as connecting to the O-31, which opened its first section on the same day. Construction of the O-30 slowed down over the next years, due to financial difficulties. Construction of the southern half of the O-30 progressed faster than construction of the northern half. On 10 July 1997, the O-30 was connected to the D-300, which was the main east–west trunk road and on 15 August 1998, the 2.5 km (1.6 mi) long section between Karabağlar and Uzundere was opened to traffic. In 1999, connection to the İzmir Bus Terminal was opened on the 10 April, followed by the 5 km (3.1 mi) long section between Uzundere and Balçova, which was opened on 30 April. The motorway was finally connected to the O-32 on 6 August 2002, via a 1.5 km (0.93 mi) viaduct through Balçova, thus completing the southern half of the O-30. Due to the slow progression of its northern half, the O-30 was nicknamed the motorway that will never open (Turkish: Açılmaz otoyol) and residents of İzmir started to protest the delay. Construction was sped up in 2006 and in January 2007 the 12.6 km (7.8 mi) section between Bornova and Karşıyaka along with two tunnels was opened. Construction progressed at a steady pace over the next years as the O-30 was extended from Karşıyaka to Çiğli on 15 June 2008.

== Exit list ==
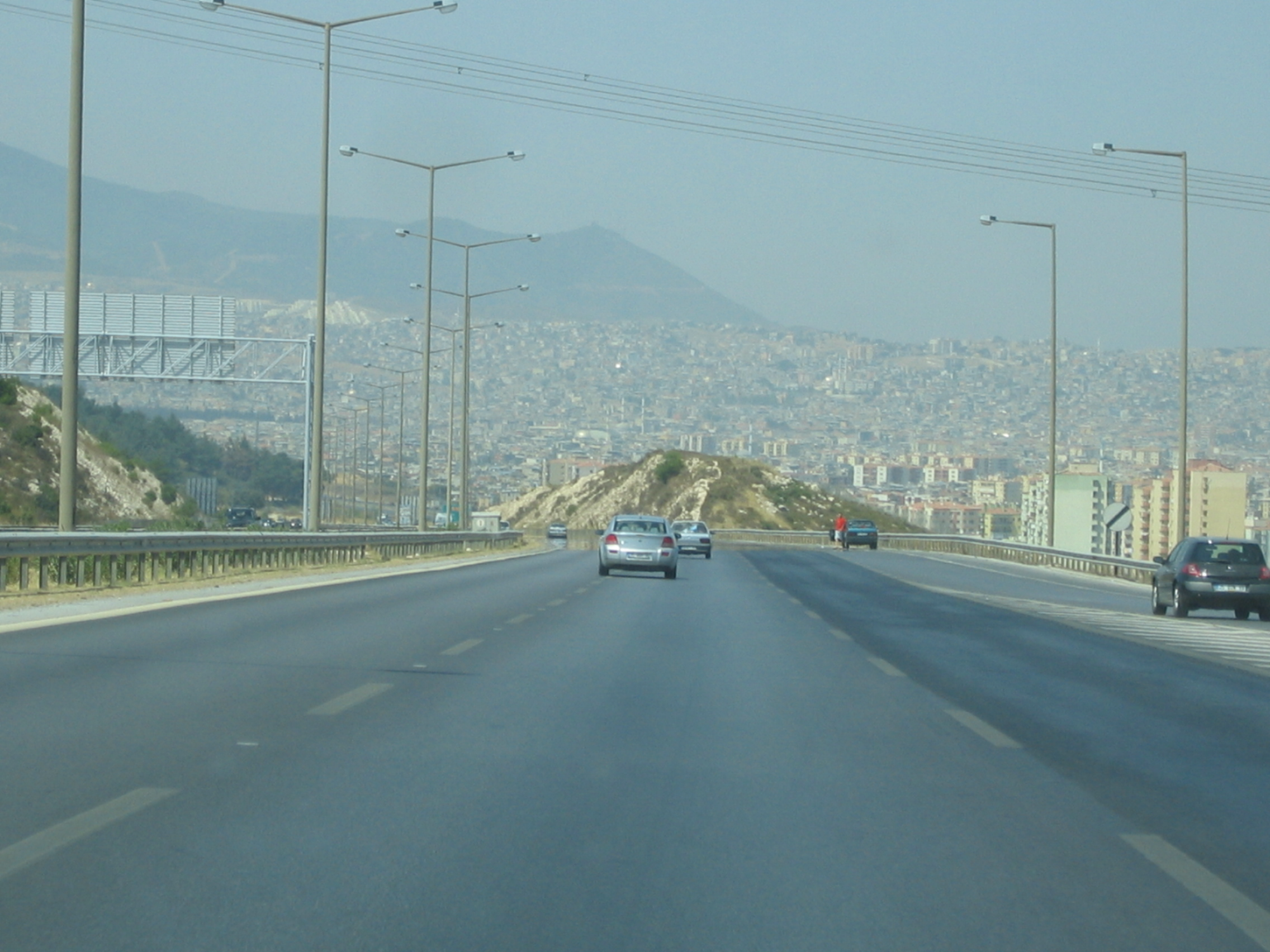
O-30 in Buca

Province	District	km	mi	Exit	Destinations	Notes
İzmir	Balçova	0.0	0.0	K1	O-32 — Çeşme, Üçkuyular	Trumpet interchange
İzmir	Balçova	1.2	0.75		Fuat Köprülü St.	Northbound entrance, southbound exit
İzmir	Karabağlar	4.6	2.9	K2	Kütüphaneci Rasime Şeyhoğlu St.	
İzmir	Karabağlar	6.8	4.2	K3	Eski İzmir Ave.	
İzmir	Gaziemir	7.9	4.9		İzmir Fairground	Northbound exit, southbound entrance and exit
İzmir	Gaziemir	9.4	5.8	K4	D.550 — Aydın, Muğla	Cloverleaf interchange
İzmir	Buca	10.7	6.6	K4-1	677/19 St.	
İzmir	Buca	16.8	10.4	K5	Doğuş Ave.	Cloverleaf interchange
İzmir	Buca	18.1	11.2	K6	Dokuz Eylül University	Trumpet interchange
İzmir	Buca	19.8	12.3	K7	O-31 — Aydın	Toll motorway
İzmir	Bornova	26.8	16.7	K8	Aydınlar Ave.	
İzmir	Bornova	27.4	17.0		Kemalpaşa Ave.	Northbound exit
İzmir	Bornova	29.4	18.3	K9	O-5 — Ankara, Istanbul, Manisa and Kemalpaşa	Cloverleaf interchange
İzmir	Bornova	30.7	19.1	K10	372nd St.	
İzmir	Bornova	31.7	19.7	K11	D.300 — Afyon, Konya, Kayseri, Van / Üniversite Ave. — Ege University	
İzmir	Bornova	33	21	K12	Yzb. İbrahim Hakkı Ave.	
İzmir	Bornova	35.3	21.9	K13	1620/39th St.	
İzmir	Bayraklı	36.4	22.6	Bayraklı-1 Tunnel		
İzmir	Bayraklı	38.9	24.2	Bayraklı-2 Tunnel		
İzmir	Bayraklı	39.9	24.8	K14	7375th St.	
İzmir	Karşıyaka	41.4	25.7	K15	Girne Blvd. — Karşıyaka	Cloverleaf interchange
İzmir	Karşıyaka	43.3	26.9	K16	6718th St. — Yamaçevler	
İzmir	Karşıyaka	44.5	27.7	K17	D.550 — Aliağa, Çanakkale	Cloverleaf interchange
İzmir	Çiğli	46.1	28.6	K18	Caher Dudayev Blvd. — Mavişehir, Çiğli	Via service road
İzmir	Çiğli	48.6	30.2	K19	Mustafa Kemal Atatürk Blvd.	Via service road
İzmir	Çiğli	50.4	31.3	K20	Ahmet Priştina Ave. — Sasalı	
İzmir	Çiğli	52.9	32.9	K21	Askeri Havaalanı Cd. — İzmir Kâtip Çelebi University	
İzmir	Menemen	56.8	35.3	K22	Karaağaç Yolu	Cloverleaf Interchange
İzmir	Menemen	60.2	37.4	K23	D.550 — Aliağa, Çanakkale O-33 — Aliağa, Çanakkale	Cloverleaf Interchange, Highway continues as O-33
1.000 mi = 1.609 km; 1.000 km = 0.621 mi: Incomplete access; Tolled; Unopened

== See also ==
- List of highways in Turkey
