= Otoyol 31 =

Highway in Turkey

O-31
- İzmir-Denizli Otoyolu

Route information
- Part of E87
- Length: 258 km (160 mi)
- Existed: 1996–present

Major junctions
- North end: O-30 in Buca, İzmir

- D.550 in Menderes; D.550 in Belevi; D.525 in Germencik; D.550 in Aydın

- South end: D.320 in Denizli

Location
- Country: Turkey
- Regions: Aegean
- Provinces: İzmir, Aydın, Denizli
- Major cities: İzmir, Aydın, Denizli

Highway system
- Highways in Turkey; Motorways; List; State Highways; List
← O-30	→ O-32

Otoyol 31, named the İzmir-Denizli Motorway (Turkish: İzmir-Denizli Otoyolu) and abbreviated as the O-31 is a 258 km (160 mi) long toll motorway in western Turkey. Beginning at an intersection with İzmir Beltway, the O-31 runs south from İzmir to Denizli and parallels the D550 and D320 for most of its route.

== Route Description ==
=== İzmir ===
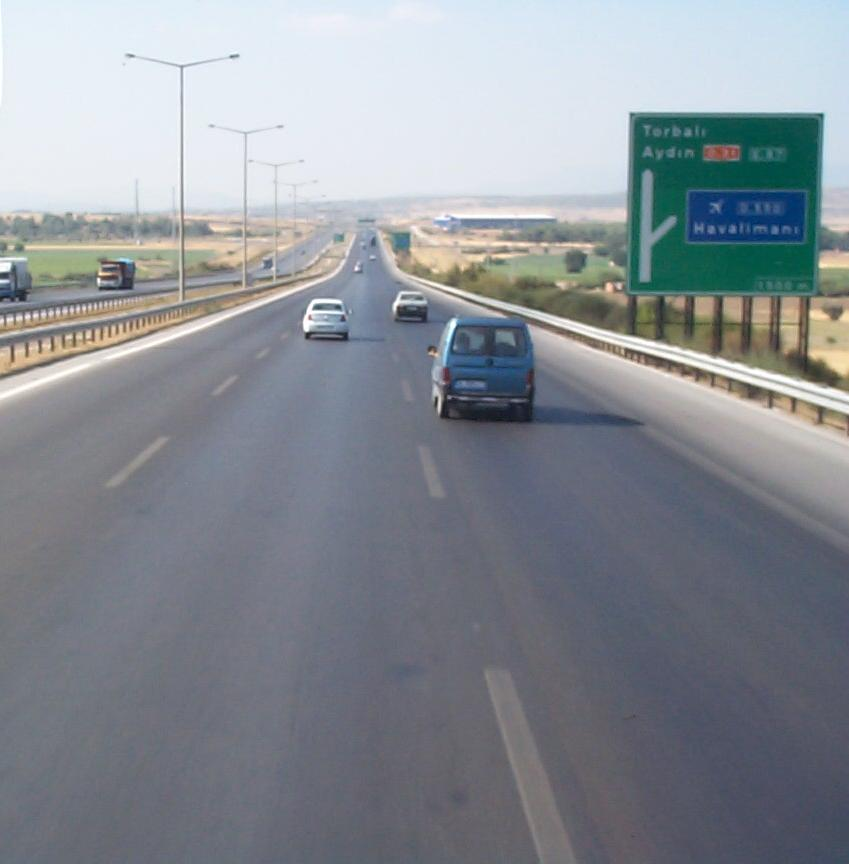
The O-31 in the Lesser Menderes Plain.

The O-31 begins at Işıkkent interchange, a trumpet interchange with the İzmir Beltway (O-30) in southeast Buca, İzmir, outside the urban city zone. From there, the route heads south through the recently closed Işıkkent Toll Plaza until reaching the Lesser Menderes Plain. The motorway crosses over the D.550, which is accessible via Exit K1. Exit K1, named Havalimanı, also provides access to Adnan Menderes Airport, via the D.550.

Following Exit K1 the O-31 becomes a toll motorway after passing through Pancar Toll Plaza, which uses automated vehicle classification to recognize different types of vehicles and price them accordingly.

The next and first tolled exit on the motorway is Exit K2, named Torbalı, which is the Torbalı connector. The 4 km (2.5 mi) long Torbalı connector links the O-31 to the D.550 just north of Torbalı. Following Exit K2, the motorway continues south bypassing Torbalı on the west. Near the village of Sağlık, is the Sağlık Rest Area, which consist of restaurants and a gas station. Exit K3, named Belevi, is the last exit within the İzmir province. This exit connects to the D.550 to Selçuk as well as the coastal city of Kuşadası.

After Exit K3, the O-31 passes over the 559 m (1,834 ft) long Belevi viaduct and then enters the 3,048 m (10,000 ft) long 75th Anniversary Selatin Tunnel (Turkish: 75. Yıl Selatin Tüneli), passing through the Aydın Mountains and into Aydın Province.

=== Aydın ===
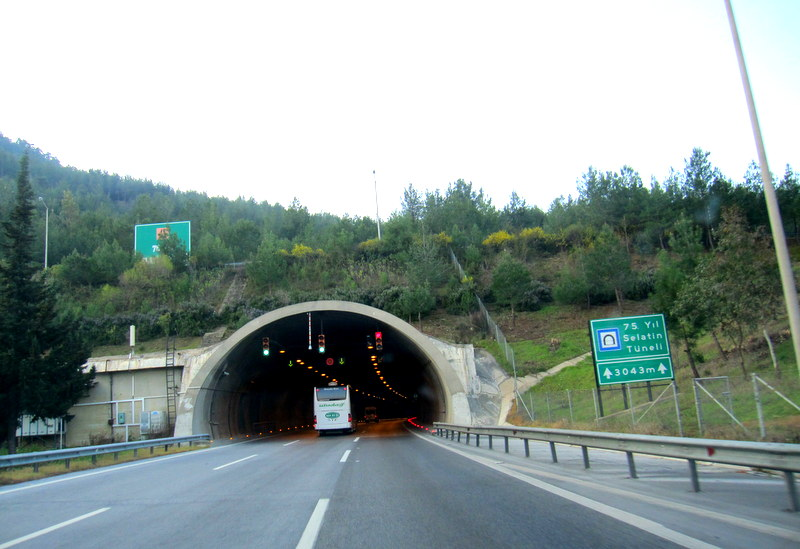
The southbound portal of the 75th Anniversary Selatin Tunnel.

After exiting the tunnel, the Selatin Rest Area is available for northbound drivers. The motorway descends into the Greater Menderes Plain and turns east. After passing over the Kızılcapınar viaducts, Exit K4, named Germencik, connects to the D.525 to Söke, as well as the D.550 to Germencik. Following the exit, the Germencik Rest Area is available to southbound drivers. After passing over the İkizdere Creek, the tolled section ends at the Aydın West Toll Plaza.

Right after the toll plaza is Exit K5, named Aydın North, with the D.550 in west Aydın. The O-31 becomes the Aydın Beltway and runs around the south of the city. The next exit is Exit K6 with the D.550, which heads south to Muğla. Up until 2016, this was the end of the motorway. Following Exit K6, is the incomplete Exit K7. Exit K7 is where the motorway continues east to Denizli and Burdur. The O-31 used to continue as the Aydın Beltway through the next exit, Exit K71. Exit K71 connects to Mehmet Ali Tosun Boulevard and the Aydın Airport. The route continues through Aydın East Toll Plaza and restarts the tolled section. This section is operated by Fernas Otoyol İşletmesi A.Ş., under a build-operate-transfer concession.

=== Denizli ===
Just over 1 km (0.6 mi) south-east of Exit K12, O-31 enters Denizli Province. Exit K12 connects Buharkent Toll Plaza to the south and the D320 just west of the city of Buharkent to the north. There is a closed rest area near Kumluca. Exit K13 connects D320 to the Sarayköy Toll Plaza to the motorway. Exit K14 leads to the Denizli Beltway (D320/D585) and Kumkısık via Denizli-Aydin Highway (near D320). Exit K15 leads to the town of Pamukkale via the Pamukkale Highway. The route and tolled section of the motorway terminates at Exit K16 in Kocabaş, connecting the motorway with D320 in Kocabaş.

== Exit list ==
Province	District	km	mi	Exit	Destinations	Notes
İzmir	Buca	0.0	0.0	K7	O-30 (İzmir Beltway) – Balçova, Bornova, Menemen	Trumpet interchange
İzmir	Menderes	11.4	7.1	K1	D.550 – Adnan Menderes Airport, Gaziemir	
İzmir	Menderes	15.3	9.5	Pancar Toll Plaza		
İzmir	Torbalı	20.5	12.7	K2	Torbalı connector — Torbalı	Feeder to D.550
İzmir	Selçuk	34.5	21.4	K3	D.550 – Selçuk	
İzmir–Aydın line	Tire–Germencik line	41.3	25.7	75th Anniversary Selatin Tunnel		
Aydın	Germencik	56.1	34.9	K4	D.525 – Söke D.550 – Germencik	
Aydın	Efeler	88	55	Aydın East Toll Plaza		
Aydın	Efeler	90	56	K5	D.550 – Aydın, İncirliova	Western end of the Aydın Beltway
Aydın	Efeler	95.9	59.6	K6	D.550 – Çine, Muğla	
Aydın	Efeler	97.1	60.3	K7	O-31 – Denizli, Burdur	
Aydın	Efeler			Aydın West Toll Plaza		
Aydın	Köşk			K8		
Aydın	Yenipazar			K9		
Aydın	Nazilli			K10		
Aydın	Kuyucak			K11	D.585 – ,	
Aydın	Buharkent			K12	D.320 – ,	
Denizli	Sarayköy			K13	D.320 – ,	
Denizli	Merkezefendi			K14	D.320 / D.585	
Denizli	Pamukkale			K15		
Denizli	Honaz			K16	D.320 – ,	
1.000 mi = 1.609 km; 1.000 km = 0.621 mi: Tolled; Unopened

== See also ==
- List of highways in Turkey
