= List of provincial roads in İzmir Province =

Provincial roads in İzmir are maintained by the KGM. These roads serve as secondary roads to the State Roads and mainly connect small villages or acting as alternate routes to the trunk roads.

== Provincial Road 35-04 ==
İl yolu 35-04
- Location: Demircidere—Bergama
- Length: 40 km (25 mi)

Provincial Road 35-04 (Turkish: İl yolu 35-04), named Bergama Road (Turkish: Bergama Yolu), is a two-lane route that runs from the provincial border with Balıkesir, near Demircidere, to Bergama. The route becomes the P 10-57 once it crosses the border into Balıkesir, where it connects to the D.550 at its northern end. The southern end of the road is at an intersection with Adnan Menderes Boulevard (D.240) in east Bergama.

== Provincial Road 35-05 ==
İl yolu 35-05
- Location: Bergama—İneşir
- Length: 38 km (24 mi)

Provincial Road 35-05 (Turkish: İl yolu 35-05) is a two-lane route that runs northeast, from an intersection with Adnan Menderes Boulevard (D.240), to the provincial border with Manisa. The route is named Turanlı Road (Turkish: Turanlı Yolu) for the first 24 km (15 mi) section from Bergama to the intersection with P 35-06. From there, the route is named Bergama-İvrindi Road (Turkish: Bergama-İvrindi Yolu) until it reaches İvrindi, in Balıkesir. At the provincial border with Manisa, the route becomes the P 45-76 for a short 4 km (2.5 mi) span where it crosses into Balıkesir and becomes the P 10-55.

== Provincial Road 35-06 ==
İl yolu 35-06
- Location: Çeltikçi
- Length: 1 km (0.62 mi)

Provincial Road 35-06 (Turkish: İl yolu 35-06) is a short 1 km (0.62 mi) long route that connects the village of Çeltikçi to the P 35-05. On the official KGM map, the village is named Turanlı and the road is named Turanlı Road (Turkish: Turanlı yolu).

== Provincial road 35-07 ==
İl yolu 35-07
- Location: Çitköy—Hamzahocalı
- Length: 27 km (17 mi)

Provincial road 35-07 (Turkish: İl yolu 35-06) is a 27 km (17 mi) long two-lane route that connects villages in the northeast Bergama plain. The route begins at the intersection with the P 35-05 and continues east through the villages of Ayaskent, Göçbeyli and Bölcek until its southeastern end at the intersection with the D.240 near Hamzahocalı.

== Provincial road 35-25 ==
İl yolu 35-25
- Location: Ulucak—Sarıçalı
- Length: 36.1 km (22.4 mi)

Provincial road 35-25 (Turkish: İl yolu 35-25) is a 36.1 km (22.4 mi) long two-lane route that runs from Ulucak to Turgutlu, via Kemalpaşa. The route serves the town of Kemalpaşa as well as several other villages on the south Kemalpaşa plain as well being an alternate route to the D.300 to Turgutlu. From the interchange with the D-300 to Kemalpaşa, the route is named Ulucak Kemalpaşa Street (Turkish: Ulucak Kemalpaşa Caddesi), within the town of Kemalpaşa the route is named İzmir Street (Turkish: İzmir Caddesi). After Kemalpaşa the route is named Turgutlu Street (Turkish: Turgutlu Caddesi).

=== Main intersections ===
District	km	mi	Destination	Notes
Kemalpaşa	0.0	0.0	D.300 — İzmir	Trumpet interchange
Kemalpaşa	3.0	1.8	Gazi Blv.	
Kemalpaşa	6.5	4.0	Kirazlı Cd.	
Kemalpaşa	9.1	5.6	241/1 Sk.	
Kemalpaşa	9.8	6.1	P.35-26 — Torbalı	
Kemalpaşa	10.1	6.3	Kemalpaşa connector — O-5	Diamond interchange, connector not yet officially named.
Kemalpaşa	36.1	22.4	P.45-26 — Turgutlu	Continuation into Manisa

== Provincial Road 35-63 ==
Bahribaba Park-Homeros Boulevard, Homeros Boulevard-Altındağ-İzmir Bus Station-O-5 (parts past Homeros Boulevard is under construction)
