= Otoyol 32 =

Coordinates: 38°17′57″N 26°38′30″E

O-32
- İzmir-Çeşme Otoyolu

Route information
- Part of E881
- Length: 77.7 km (48.3 mi)
- Existed: 1992–present

Major junctions
- East end: M.K. Coastal Blvd. in Balçova, İzmir
- O-30 in Balçova
- West end: 2122nd St. in Çeşme

Location
- Country: Turkey
- Regions: Aegean
- Provinces: İzmir
- Major cities: İzmir

Highway system
- Highways in Turkey; Motorways; List; State Highways; List
← O-31	→ O-33

Otoyol 32 (English: Motorway 3), also known as the İzmir-Çeşme Motorway (Turkish: İzmir-Çeşme Otoyolu), or just as the Çeşme Motorway and abbreviated as the O-32 is a 77.7 km (48.3 mi) long toll motorway located entirely within the İzmir Province in Turkey. The O-32 runs from Balçova, İzmir to the coastal resort town of Çeşme on the Karaburun Peninsula. The motorway connects to the O-30 (İzmir Beltway) in Izmir.

The motorway serves towns situated on the southern shore of the Gulf of İzmir as well as summer houses and resort towns towards its western end. The campus of the İzmir Institute of Technology (İYTE) is located just off the O-32 as well as the İzmir Technology Development Zone

== History ==
Construction of the İzmir-Çeşme Motorway began in December 1989. The first section between Balçova and Urla was opened to traffic on 4 July 1992. The fifth and final section was completed on 24 August 1996.

== Exit list ==
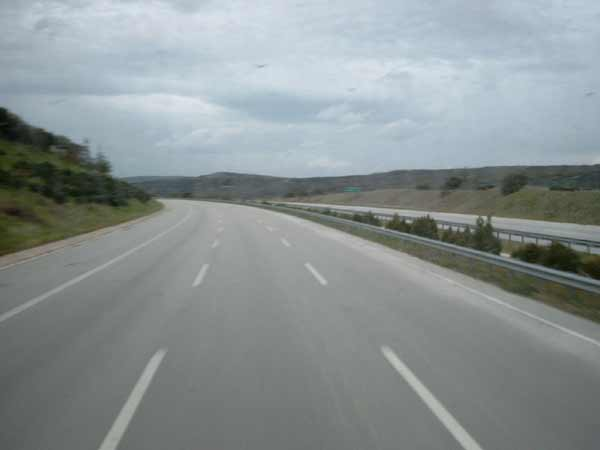
O-32 near Urla

Province	District	km	mi	Exit	Destinations	Notes
İzmir	Balçova	0.0	0.0		Mustafa Kemal Coastal Blvd. – Konak	
İzmir	Balçova	0.9	0.56	K1	O-30 (İzmir Bltwy) — Bornova, Menemen	
İzmir	Narlıdere	6.4	4.0	K2	D.300 — Narlıdere	
İzmir	Güzelbahçe	18.9	11.7	K3	P.35-39 — Seferihisar	
İzmir	Urla	19.2	11.9	Şirinkent Toll Plaza		
İzmir	Urla	28.3	17.6	K4	Urla connector — Urla	
İzmir	Urla	37.1	23.1	K5	D.300 to D.505 — Karaburun	
İzmir	Urla	49.5	30.8	K6	D.300 — Zeytinler	
İzmir	Çeşme	66.4	41.3	K7	Alaçatı connector — Alaçatı	Connector to D.300
İzmir	Çeşme	75.2	46.7	Çeşme Toll Plaza		
İzmir	Çeşme	75.7	47.0	K8	7000th St. — Musalla	
İzmir	Çeşme	77.7	48.3	K9	2122nd St. — Çeşme	
1.000 mi = 1.609 km; 1.000 km = 0.621 mi: Tolled

== See also ==
- List of highways in Turkey
