= European route E881 =

Road in trans-European E-road network

E881

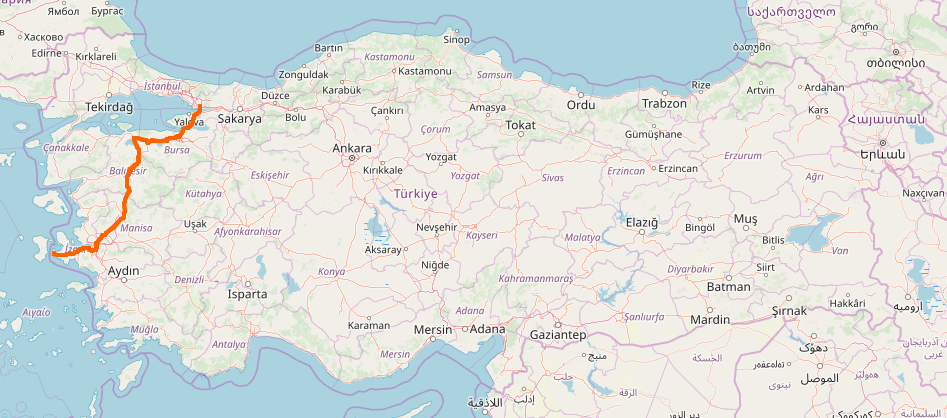

Route information
- Length: 550 km (340 mi)

Major junctions
- Kocaeli end: Gebze
- Kocaeli Province, Yalova Province, Bursa Province, Balıkesir Province, Manisa Province, İzmir Province,
- İzmir end: Çeşme

Location
- Country: Turkey

Highway system
- Highways in Turkey; Motorways; List; State Highways; List

European route E 881 is a European B class road in Turkey, connecting the cities Gebze, Kocaeli and Çeşme, İzmir.

== Route ==
- Turkey
  - O-5: Gebze, Kocaeli - Yalova - Bursa ( E90) - Balıkesir - Manisa ( E96) - Bornova, İzmir ( E87)
  - O-30: Menemen, İzmir - Balçova, İzmir
  - O-32: Balçova, İzmir - Çeşme, İzmir
