= O33 =

O33 may refer to:

- Otoyol 33, a motorway in Turkey
- Samoa Field Airport, in Humboldt County, California, United States
- Thomas-Morse O-33, an observation aircraft of the United States Army Air Corps
