= 75th Anniversary Selatin Tunnel =

Road tunnel in Turkey

75th Anniversary Selatin Tunnel: 75. Yıl Selatin Tüneli
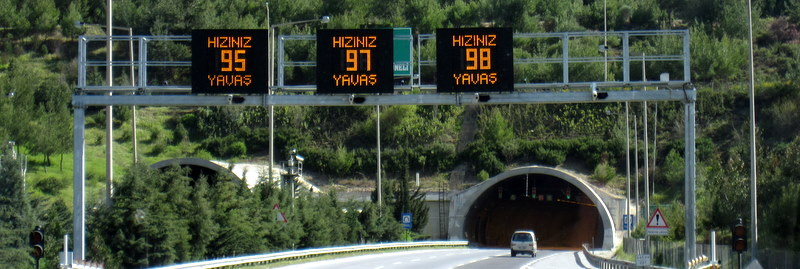
- Interactive map of 75th Anniversary Selatin Tunnel; 75. Yıl Selatin Tüneli

Overview
- Location: Belevi, Selçuk, İzmir Province-Germencik, Aydın Province
- Coordinates: 37.97819°N 27.50202°E Location of 75th Anniversary Selatin Tunnel in Turkey.

- Route: O-31 / E87
- Start: 1 April 1990

Operation
- Constructed: Kutlutaş and Dillingham joint venture
- Opened: 20 April 2000; 26 years ago
- Operator: General Directorate of Highways
- Traffic: automotive

Technical
- Length: 3,018 m (9,902 ft) and 3,043 m (9,984 ft)
- No. of lanes: 2 x 3
- Operating speed: 80 km/h (50 mph)
- Max elevation: 243 m (797 ft)
- Min elevation: 164 m (538 ft)
- Tunnel clearance: 4.80 m (15.7 ft)
- Width: 12 m (39 ft) each bore
- Grade: 2.6%

75th Anniversary Selatin Tunnel (Turkish: 75. Yıl Selatin Tüneli), is a road tunnel constructed on the motorway O-31 / E87 at the province border of İzmir and Aydın, western Turkey. It is situated 35 km (22 mi) northwest of Aydın and 80 km (50 mi) southeast of İzmir, between the junctions Belevi and Germencik. With its length of 3,043 m (9,984 ft), it was the country's longest tunnel when opened on 20 April 2000.

Starting on 1 April 1990, its construction was carried out by the joint venture Kutlutaş and Dillingham in New Austrian Tunnelling method (NATM). The cost of the tunnel totalled to US$121 million.

The tunnel was initially named after its location in Selatin village of Germencik district. Following its completion, it was renamed in memory of the 75th anniversary of the foundation of the Turkish Republic (1923).

As of 2012, it ranks on the second place after the 3.8 km (2.4 mi) long Ordu Nefise Akçelik Tunnel opened in 2007. It has twin bores of 3,018 m (9,902 ft) and 3,043 m (9,984 ft) length, and carries three lanes of traffic in each direction. Each of the bores is 12 m (39 ft) wide and 4.80 m (15.7 ft) high.

The tunnel is equipped with a modern electronic road traffic safety and control system as the first ever in Turkey. Speed limit in the tunnel is 80 km/h (50 mph), which can be reduced to 60 km/h (37 mph) or 40 km/h (25 mph) upon certain conditions. Dangerous goods carriers are not permitted to use the tunnel.

== Civil engineering feat ==
Turkish Chamber of Civil Engineers lists 75th year Selatin Tunnel as one of the fifty civil engineering feats in Turkey, a list of remarkable engineering projects realized in the first 50 years of the chamber.

== See also ==
- List of motorway tunnels in Turkey
