= Bayraklı Tunnels =

Two road tunnels in İzmir, Turkey

Bayraklı Tunnels Bayraklı Tünelleri
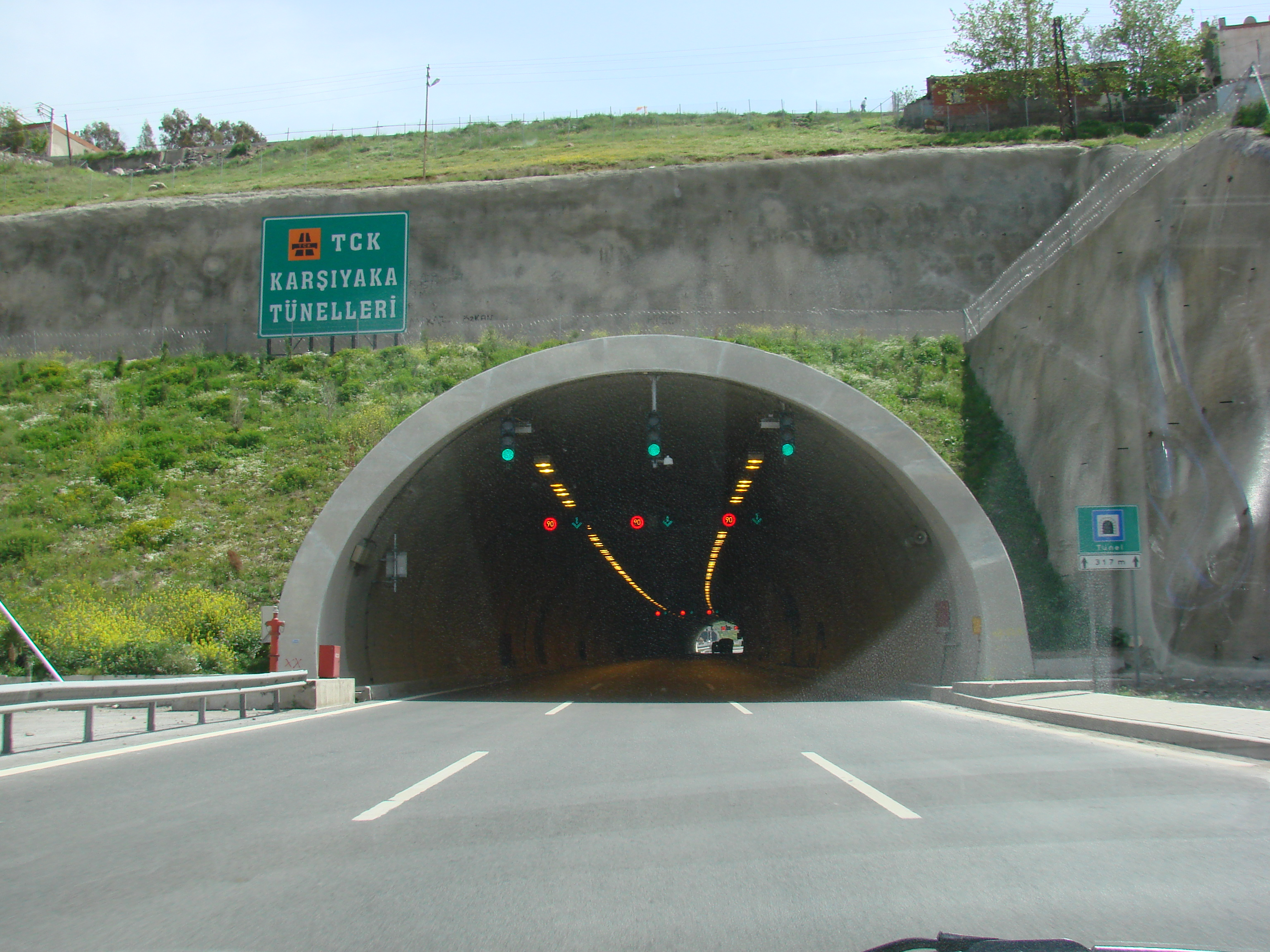
- Bayraklı-1 Tunnel
- Interactive map of Bayraklı Tunnels; Bayraklı Tünelleri

Overview
- Location: Bayraklı - Bornova, İzmir Province
- Coordinates: 38°29′04″N 27°08′26″E Location of Bayraklı Tunnels in Turkey.

- Route: O-30 E87

Operation
- Constructed: Kutlutaş-Dillingham Consortium
- Opened: 4 February 2007; 19 years ago
- Operator: General Directorate of Highways
- Traffic: automotive

Technical
- Length: Bayraklı-1: 320 and 317 m (1,050 and 1,040 ft); Bayraklı-2: 1,865 and 1,876 m (6,119 and 6,155 ft)
- No. of lanes: 2 x 3
- Operating speed: 90 km/h (56 mph)

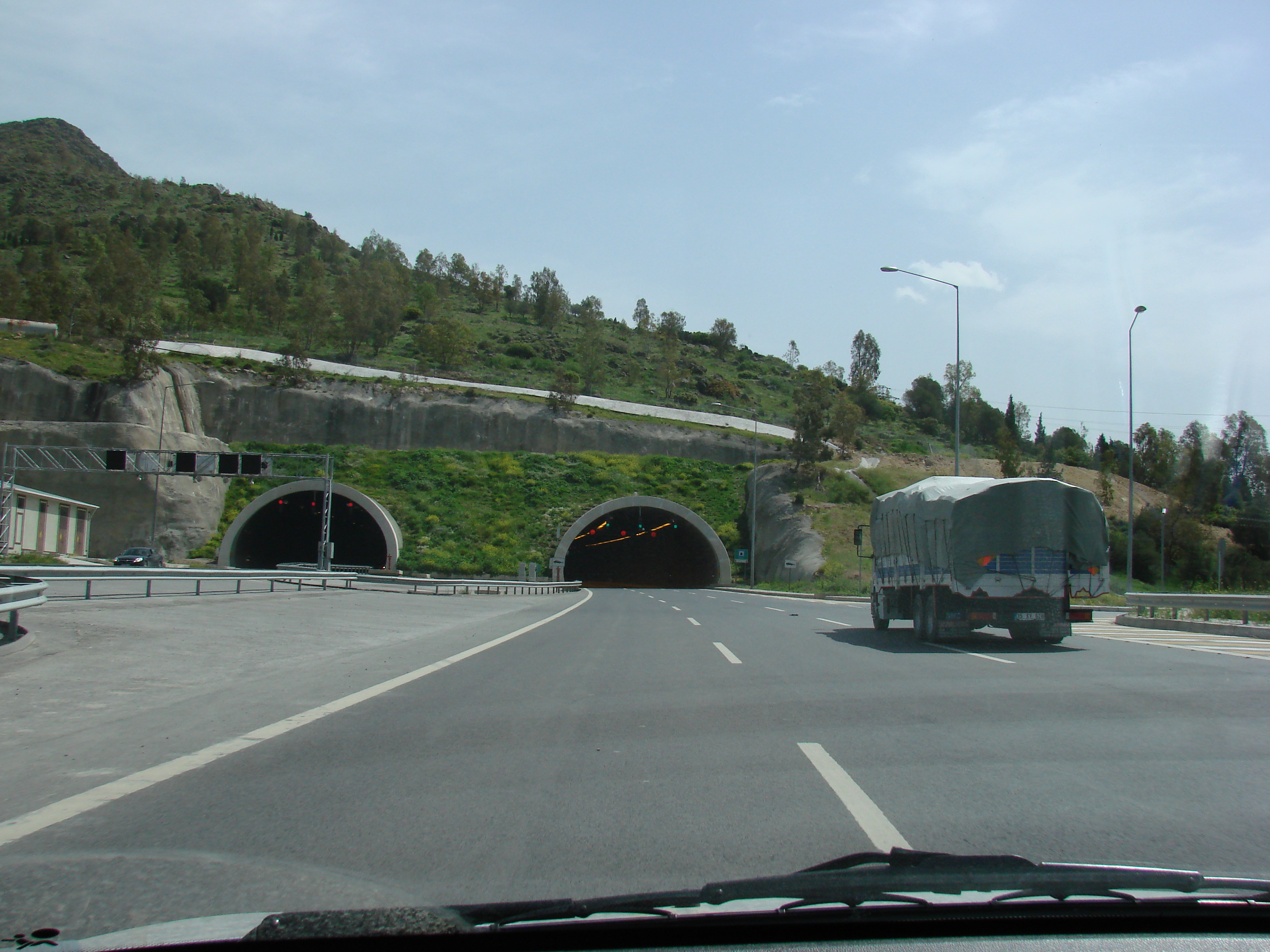
Bayraklı-2 Tunnel

Bayraklı Tunnels (Turkish: Bayraklı Tünelleri), formerly Karşıyaka Tunnels, are two motorway tunnels in series located on the İzmir's northern beltway, motorway O-30 E87, in Bayraklı district between Karşıyaka and Bornova of İzmir Province, western Turkey.

The tunnels were built by Kutlutaş-Dillingham Consortium, and the construction completed on 30 April 1999. However, the construction of the motorway lasted until 2007. Along with the motorway, the tunnels were opened to traffic on 19 January 2007. The official opening took place in presence of Prime Minister Recep Tayyip Erdoğan on 4 February 2007.

Named initially Karşıyaka Tunnels, they were renamed later to Bayraklı Tunnels upon the request of the Bayraklı district's governor. The 320 and 317 m (1,050 and 1,040 ft) (Bayraklı-1) and 1,865 and 1,876 m (6,119 and 6,155 ft)-long (Bayraklı-2) twin-tube tunnels carry three lanes of traffic in each direction. Dangerous goods carriers are not permitted to use the tunnel. Instead, they have to use either of the given routes:

- Bornova exit-D550-Altınyol-Girne Boulevard-Karşıyaka Entry
- Bayraklı exit-street #1620/39-street #1620/41-street #1609-Kubilay avenue-Onur Neighbourhood Entry

Tunnel	Motorway	Length (bore #1 and bore #2)	Province
Bayraklı-1	O-30 E87	320 and 317 m (1,050 and 1,040 ft)	İzmir
Bayraklı-2	O-30 E87	1,865 and 1,876 m (6,119 and 6,155 ft)	İzmir

== See also ==
- List of motorway tunnels in Turkey
