= İnciraltı =

- Neighbourhood
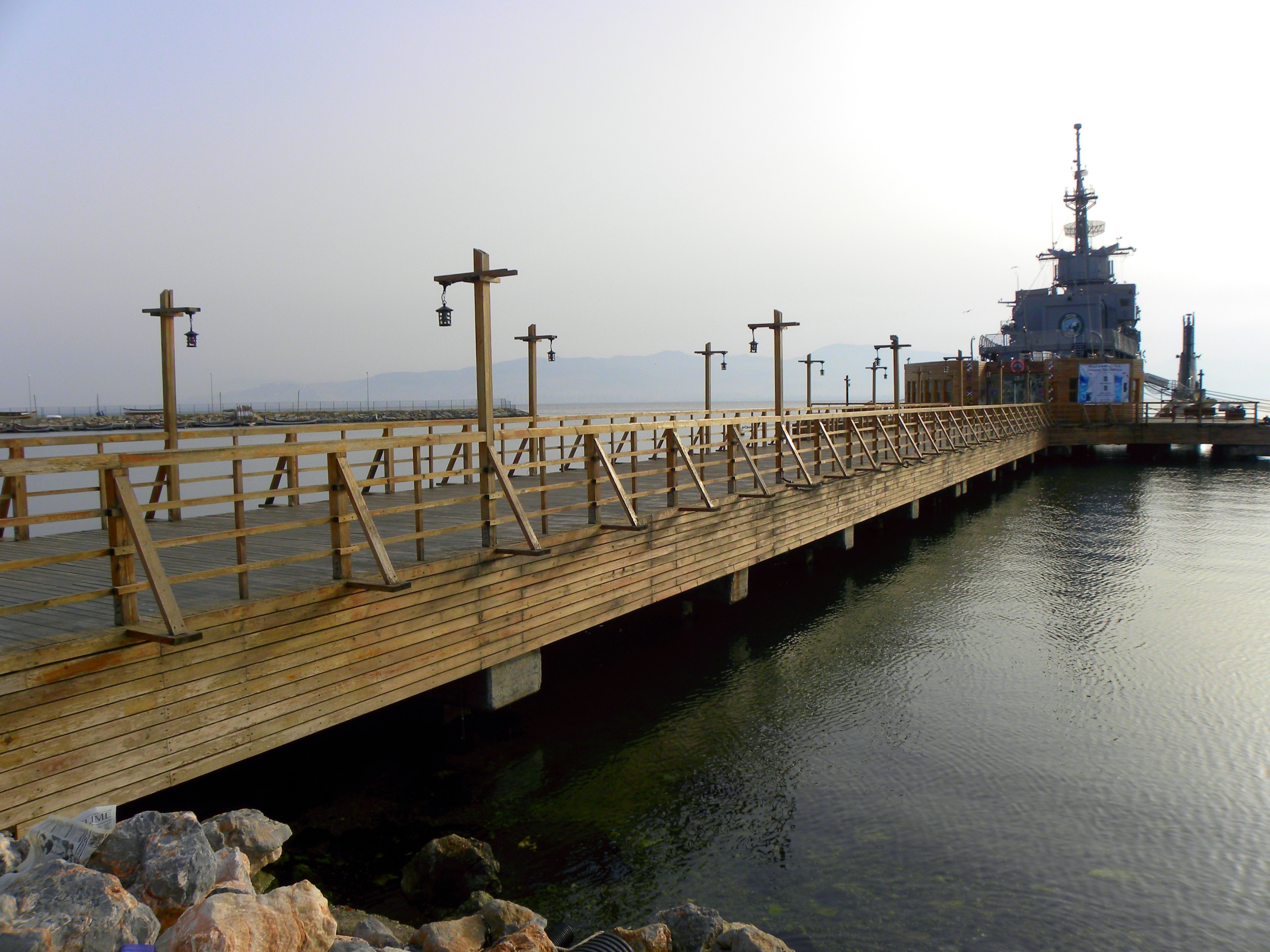
- İnciraltı Sea Museum

- Location within Turkey Location within İzmir
- Coordinates: 38°24′14″N 27°01′50″E
- Country: Turkey
- Province: İzmir
- District: Balçova
- Population (2022): 5,925
- Time zone: UTC+3 (TRT)
- Area code: 0232

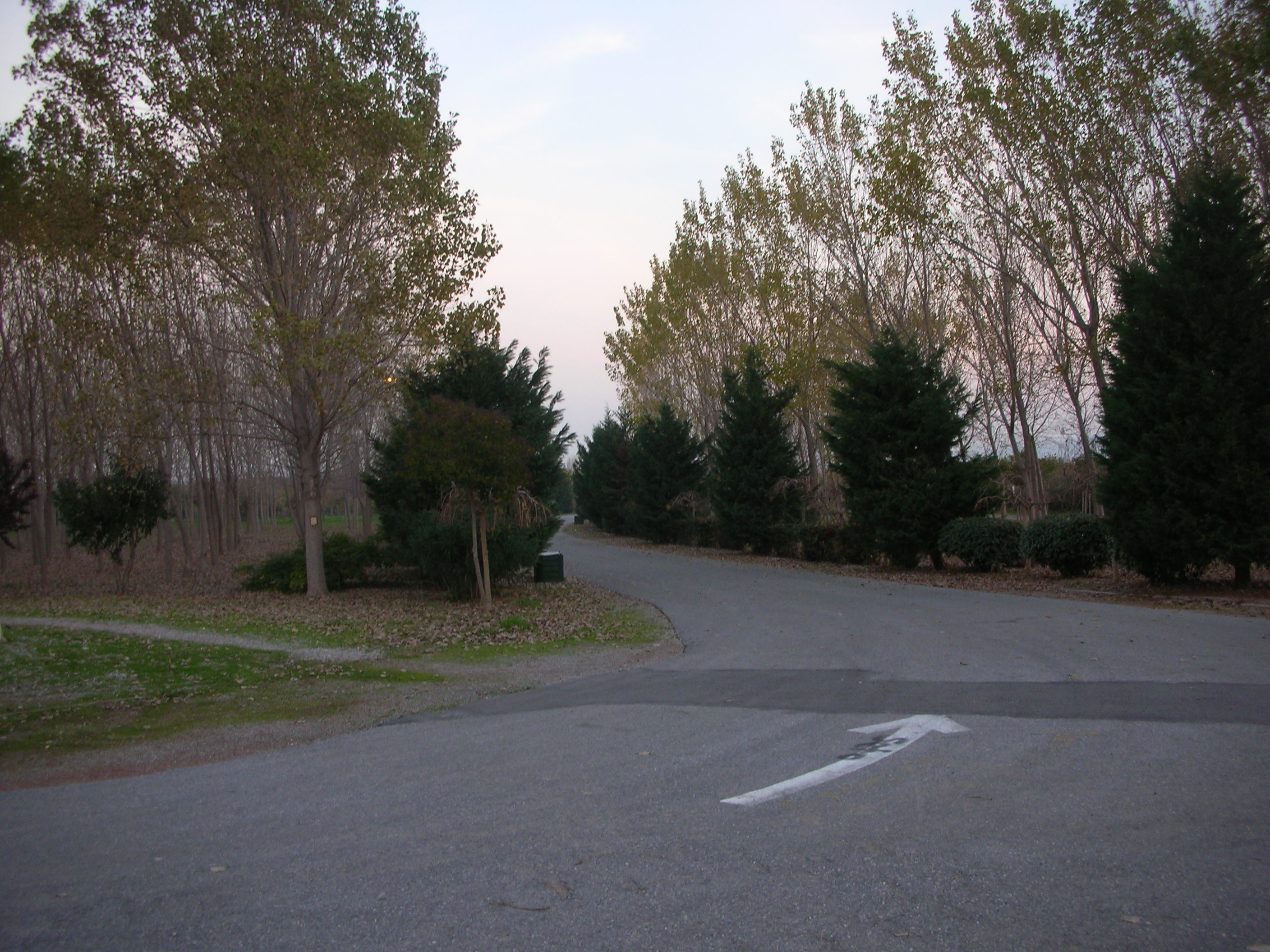
İnciraltı Forest

İnciraltı is a neighbourhood in the municipality and district of Balçova, İzmir Province, Turkey. Its population is 5,925 (2022).

== Geography ==
İnciraltı is a coastal neighborhood facing the Gulf of İzmir to the north. Its westernmost point is at the 38°25′04″N 27°01′04″E (Yenikale headland) and the easternmost point is at 38°24′17″N 27°04′12″E (Üçkuyular pier). Between these two points there is also a fishery. The forest area to the north of the neighborhood is named İnciraltı forest. The birds flight distance to İzmir city center is about 10 kilometres (6.2 mi).

== History ==
In the past İnciraltı was the most important public beach and picnic area of İzmir. In weekends, ferries used to transport İzmir citizens to İnciraltı. It was also potentially one of the development areas of İzmir. But after the area around İnciraltı was declared an Archaeological site, no new housing was permitted.

== İnciraltı now ==
In addition to old houses there are six shopping malls, some hotels and some university buildings which were built out of the restricted area. İnciraltı Sea Museum is actually a boat. When İzmir applied for Expo 2020, İnciraltı was the candidate for the EXPO 2020 area.
