= Otoyol 33 =

O-33
- Northern Aegean Motorway; Kuzey Ege Otoyolu

Route information
- Part of E87
- Length: 55.2 km (34.3 mi)
- Existed: 2019–present

Major junctions
- South end: O-30 in Çiğli, İzmir
- North end: Bergama

Location
- Country: Turkey
- Regions: Aegean
- Provinces: İzmir

Highway system
- Highways in Turkey; Motorways; List; State Highways; List
← O-32	→ O-51

Otoyol 33, O-33 or North Aegean Motorway (Turkish: Kuzey Ege Otoyolu) and abbreviated as the O-33 is a 55.2 km (34.3 mi) long toll motorway in western Turkey.Beginning at an intersection with İzmir Beltway, the O-33 runs north from Çiğli to Bergama and parallels the D550 for most of its route.

== History ==
On 15 February 2017, the tender to construct the motorway was awarded to a consortium of three companies, IC İçdaş, Kalyon, and Astaldi. Like other otoyol projects in Turkey, the tender was awarded under a build-operate-transfer contract until 2027. Groundbreaking for the highway took place on 5 April 2017 in a ceremony attended by Prime Minister Binali Yıldırım and Minister of Transport Ahmet Arslan. The US$408.2 million motorway was opened to traffic on 30 October 2019.

The designation O-33 had previously been used for the Bursa Beltway, now designated as a part of the O-5 and O-22.

== Exit list ==
Province	District	km	mi	Exit	Destinations	Notes
İzmir	Menemen	0	0.0		O-30	Highway continues as O-30
İzmir	Menemen	5.4	3.4	K1	D.250 — Manisa, Turgutlu	
İzmir	Menemen	14.3	8.9	Menemen Toll Plaza		
İzmir	Menemen	16.4	10.2	Buruncuk Tunnel		
İzmir	Menemen	18.2	11.3	K2	P.35-79 — Foça	Connects to D.550
İzmir	Aliağa	23.1	14.4	K3	P.35-79 — Yeni Foça	Connects to D.550
İzmir	Aliağa	28.8	17.9	K4	Necmettin Giritlioğlu Cd. — Aliağa	Connects to D.550
İzmir	Aliağa	32.9	20.4	K5	Aliağa O.S.B.	
İzmir	Aliağa	46.3	28.8	K6	Mimar Sinan Cd. — Yenişakran	
İzmir	Bergama	55.2	34.3	K7	Çandarlı Connector — Port of Çandarlı	Connects to D.550
1.000 mi = 1.609 km; 1.000 km = 0.621 mi: Incomplete access; Tolled; Unopened

== See also ==
- List of highways in Turkey
