= Laodicea Combusta =

Ancient city in Turkey

- Λαοδίκεια Κατακεκαυμένη (Ancient Greek)
- Laodikeia Katakekaumenê, Claudiolaodicea
- Location within Turkey
- 38°11′27.6″N 32°22′28.2″E
- Cultures: Hellenism (Greek culture), Romans, Byzantine
- Location: Turkey
- Region: Konya Province

History
- Built by: Seleucus I Nicator

Laodicea Combusta (Ancient Greek: Λαοδίκεια Κατακεκαυμένη, Laodikeia Katakekaumenê, "Laodicea the Burned") or Laodicea (Greek: Λαοδίκεια), and later known as Claudiolaodicea, was a Hellenistic city in central Anatolia, in the region of Pisidia; its site is currently occupied by the town of Ladik in the municipality of Sarayönü, Konya Province, in Central Anatolia, Turkey.

== Etymology ==
Its surname (Latin: Combusta) is derived by Strabo (from the volcanic nature of the surrounding country), but Hamilton asserts that there is not a particle of volcanic or igneous rock in the neighbourhood, and it may be added that, if such were the case, the town would rather have been called, in Greek, Laodikeia tês katakekaumenês. The most probable solution undoubtedly is that the town was at one time destroyed by fire, and that on being rebuilt it received the distinguishing surname.

Some ancient authors describe it as situated in Lycaonia and others as a town of Pisidia, and Ptolemy places it in Galatia, but this discrepancy is easily explained by recollecting that the territories just mentioned were often extended or reduced in extent, so that at one time the town belonged to Lycaonia, while at another it formed part of Pisidia. Its foundation is not mentioned by any ancient writer.

== History ==
Laodicea was one of the five cities built by Seleucus I Nicator and named after his mother Laodice. It was restored by Claudius and received the name Claudiolaodicea in 41 AD which was used up to the end of the third century. There are a few imperial coins of Laodicea, belonging to the reigns of Titus and Domitian. It was situated to the northwest of Iconium (now Konya), on the high road leading from the west coast to Melitene on the Euphrates. The apostle Paul passed several times by the town and many early Christians named their sons after him. From the fourth century there is evidence of aurarii, people either working or selling it, and it is likely that the town enjoyed some prosperity.

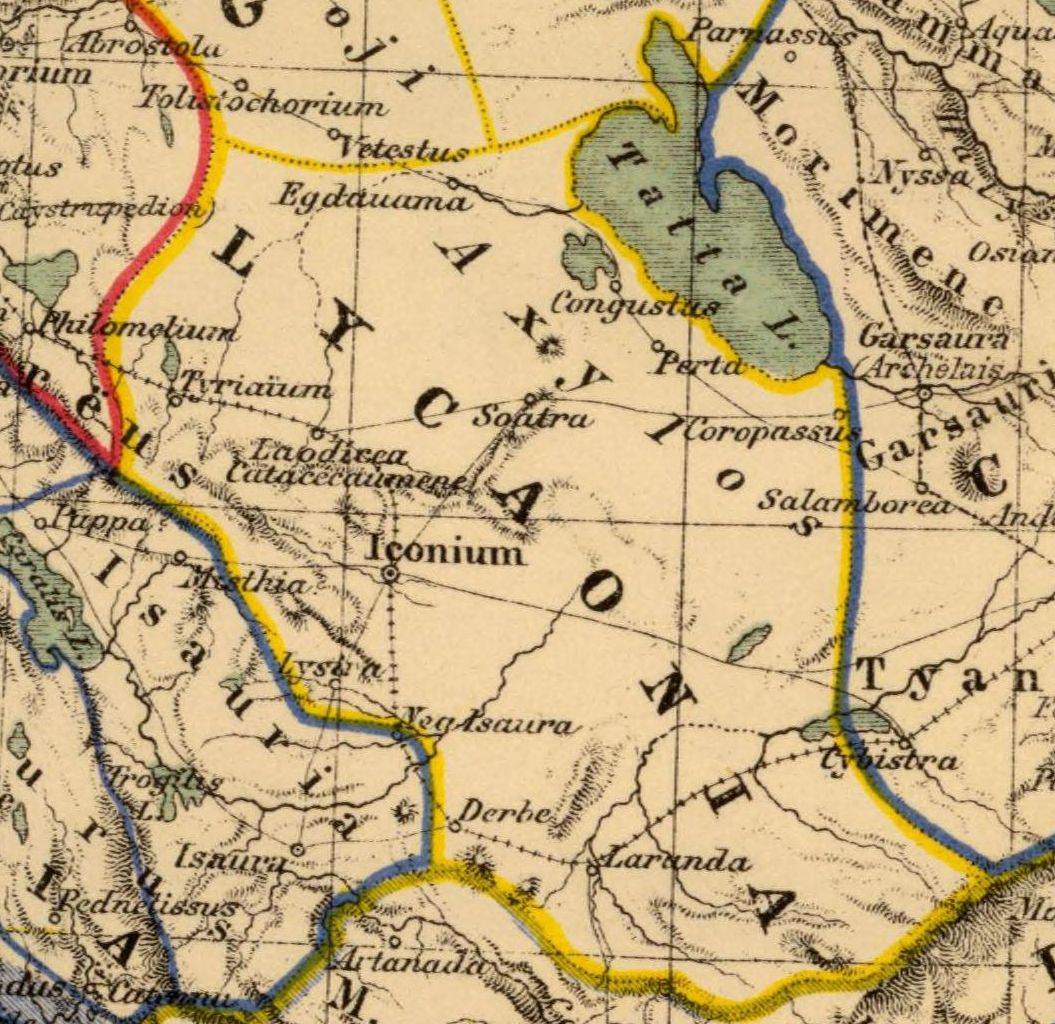
Laodicea is depicted here as Laodiceia Catacecaumenê

Later, Laodicea was part of the Byzantine Empire and a major town of the Anatolikon theme. It was sacked in 770 by the Arabs who deported its population. In the late 12th century the town was burned by Suleiman II.

Numerous fragments of ancient architecture and sculpture have been found and visitors in the 19th century described seeing inscribed marbles, altars, columns, capitals, friezes, and cornices dispersed throughout the streets and among the houses and burying grounds. From this it would appear that Laodicea must once have been a very considerable town. Nowadays unfortunately almost no archaeological sites or monuments remain.

== Ecclesiastic history ==
The Christian community of Laodicea might go back to the journeys of Paul and existed latest by the second century as attested by inscriptions. It seems that it was one of the most christianised places in the area. A bishop named Eugenius who had been persecuted during the Diocletianic persecution of Christians is known to have build a church, possibly a cathedral, according to his tomb. There is also evidence for a chorepiscopus for the middle of the fifth century as a participant at the Council of Chalcedon. The only other known council where a bishop of Laodicea participated is the council of Constantinople in 692 AD.

Since 1933 it is a titular see but it has been vacant.

== See also ==
- List of ancient Greek cities
