= European route E96 =

Road in trans-European E-road network

E96

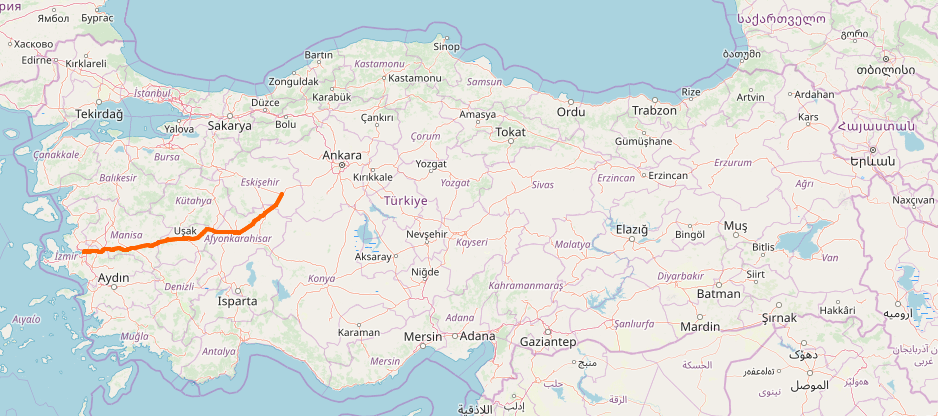

Route information
- Length: 436 km (271 mi)

Major junctions
- West end: İzmir
- East end: Sivrihisar

Location
- Countries: Turkey

Highway system
- International E-road network; A Class; B Class

European route E96 or E96 is a European route running from İzmir in Turkey (connected to European route E881) to Sivrihisar (in Turkey), which is connected to European route E90. The road is a Class A West-East reference road in the European road network.

== History ==
The road was previously known as E23. in the mid 1980s the route was added to the new road numbering system as the E96. In the 2000, the route was removed from the road numbering system. At the urging of the Turkish Government in 2005, the route was once again assigned the number E96.

== Route ==
Turkey

- O-5: İzmir ( E87 E881) - Kemalpaşa
- D.300: Kemalpaşa - Turgutlu - Salihli - Uşak - Afyonkarahisar - Emirdag - Sivrihisar ( E90)
