= Dillingham Construction =

American engineering and construction company

Dillingham Construction International, Inc.
- Formerly: Oahu Railway and Land Company; Hawaiian Dredging and Construction Co.; Dilingham Construction
- Industry: Construction
- Founded: 1889; 137 years ago
- Founder: Walter F. Dillingham; Lowell Dillingham
- Headquarters: Ponca City, Oklahoma, United States
- Key people: Benjamin Dillingham
- Website: www.dcintinc.com

Dillingham Construction International, Inc. (DCII) is an American engineering and construction services company, with North American headquarters in Ponca City, Oklahoma. It was previously based in Oahu, Hawaii then in San Francisco, and Pleasanton, California. The company was founded by Walter F. Dillingham in 1889, as the Oahu Railway and Land Company to build a railroad across the swamps of Oahu, Hawaii for large-scale sugar cane production. It is also known as Dillingham Construction.

== History ==
In 1902, Walter F. Dillingham founded the Hawaiian Dredging and Construction Co.. In 1912, Walter F. Dillingham purchased 84 acres (34 ha) from the former Bernice P. Bishop Estate, which used the land for property development to create the neighborhood of Waikiki and many of its early related buildings and structures (including the Ala Wai Canal).

Walter's son, Lowell Dillingham, led the company in 1961, overseeing a merger a year earlier between the Hawaiian Dredging and Construction Co. and the Oahu Railway and Land Company in order to form the public Dillingham Corporation. In 1959, the company began construction of one of its largest projects was the $30 million USD Ala Moana Center shopping mall. In the 1960s the company started to expand internationally. Dillingham became a leading engineering and construction firm, building dams, airfields, high-rises, hotels and embassies around the world.

The company was sold to private investors in 1983, for $347 million USD. In 1986, Dillingham's new owners began selling many of the company's subsidiaries in order to relieve its debt load. Lowell Dillingham died in 1987. In 1988, the Dillingham Construction company moved the headquarters from San Francisco, to Pleasanton, California.

== Controversy ==
The company had a series of issues in the county of San Francisco in the 1970s, and the county of Los Angeles in the early 2000s; with claims of over-billing, poor construction, onsite racism, and misrepresentation of minority involvement. From 2000 until 2003, the company had a series of litigation and debt issues, which culminated into filing for chapter 11 bankruptcy in 2003.

== Notable projects ==
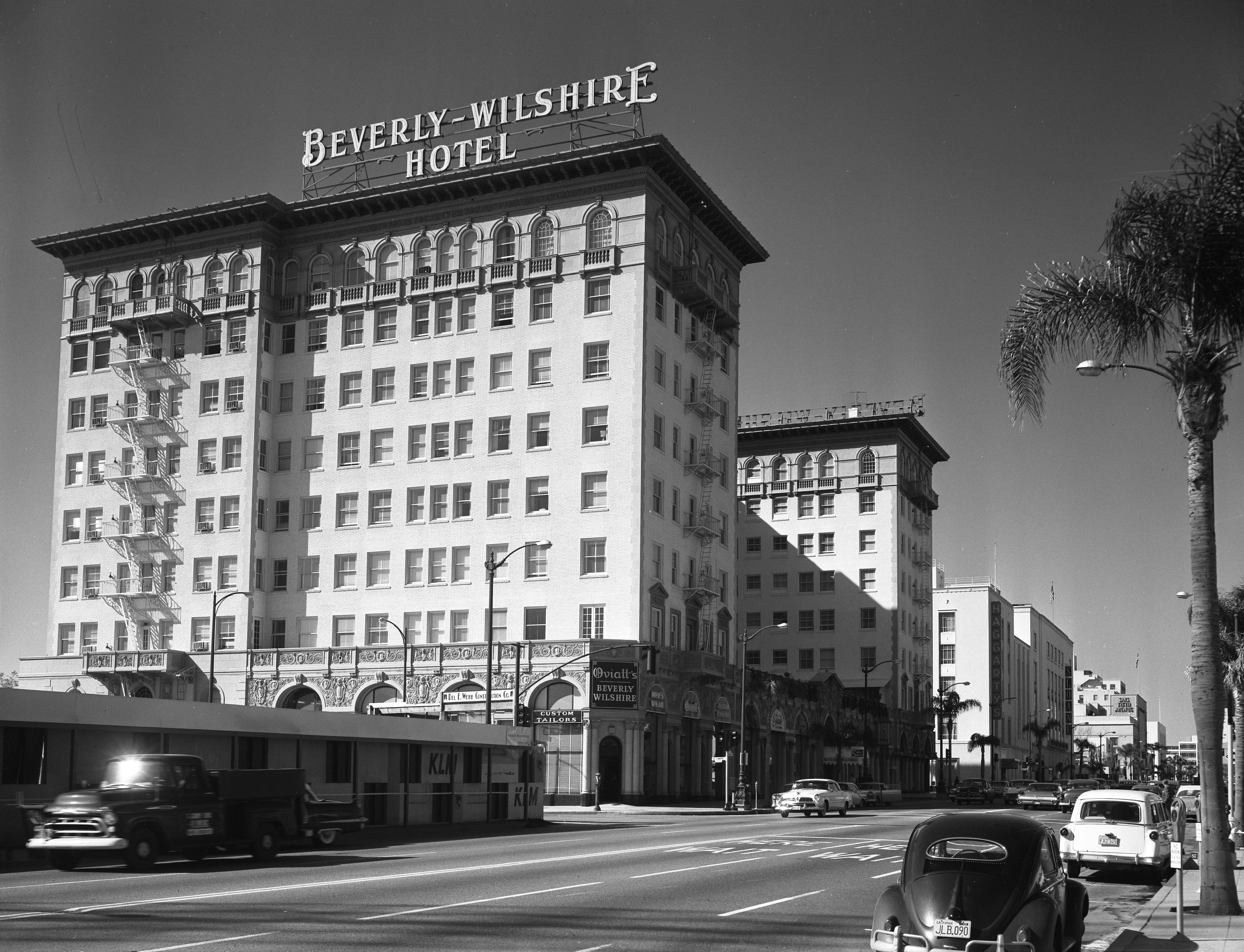
Beverly Wilshire Hotel in 1959

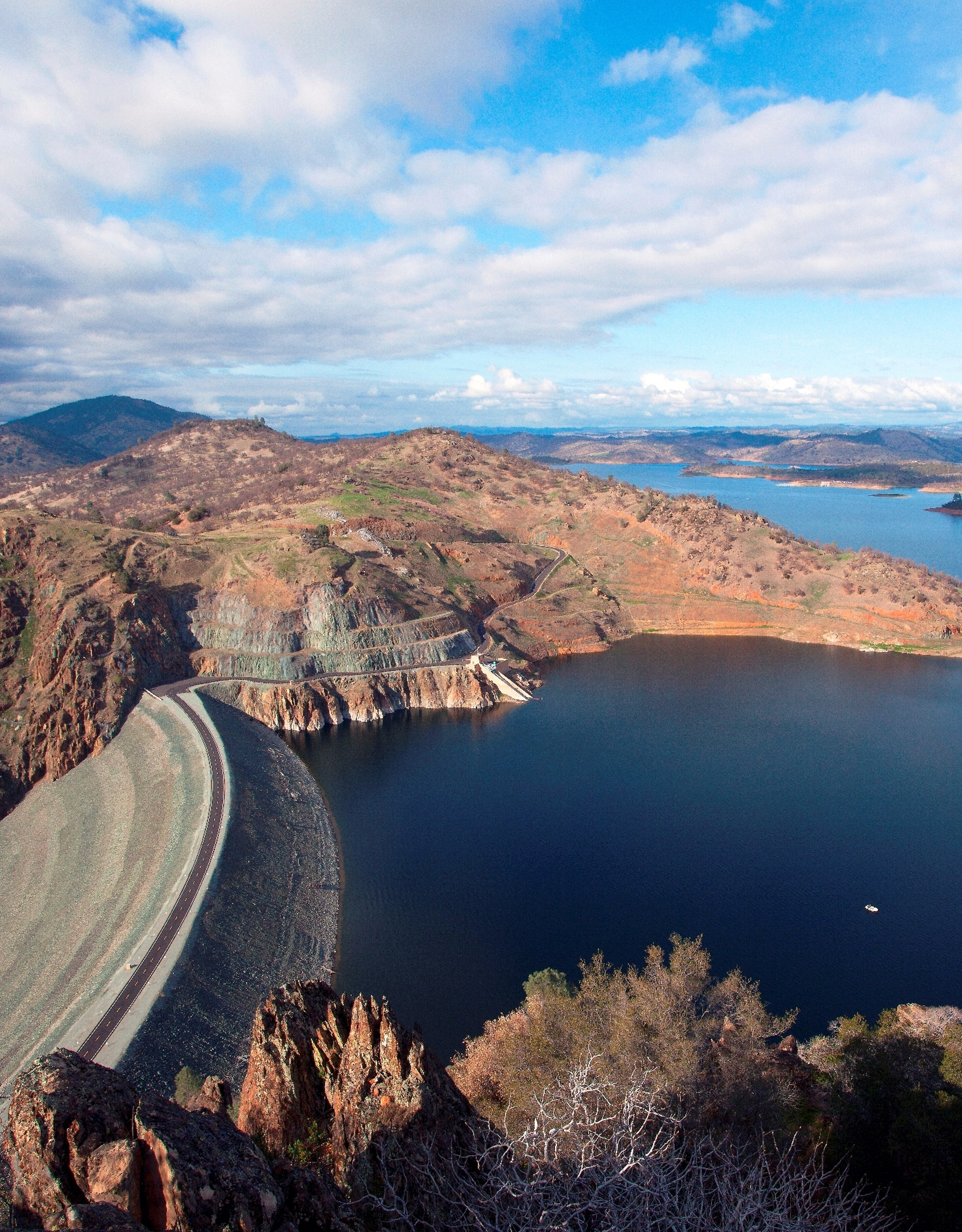
New Melones Dam

- Pearl Harbor dry docks (1909), Oahu, Hawaii
- Beverly Wilshire Hotel (1928), Beverly Hills, California
- Griffith Park Observatory (1935) in Los Angeles, California
- Hilton Hawaiian Village (1955), Waikiki, Oahu, Hawaii
- Ala Moana Shopping Center (1966; now Ala Moana Center), Oahu, Hawaii
- 44 Montgomery (1962–1967), Financial District, San Francisco, California
- One Embarcadero Center (1971), Embarcadero, San Francisco, California
- Grand Hyatt San Francisco (1972), Embarcadero, San Francisco, California
- 50 California Street (1972), Financial District, San Francisco, California
- New Melones Dam (1979), near Jamestown, California
- BC Place (1983), Vancouver, Canada
- Bayraklı Tunnels (1999; formerly Karşıyaka Tunnels), Izmir Province, Turkey
- North East MRT Line Outram Park station and tunnelling works to HarbourFront station, Singapore
- US Embassy, Singapore
- US Embassy, Moscow
- Sakkara Air Base
- Tahoe Keys, California
- Los Angeles Emergency Operations Center, Los Angeles, California
