= Kızılot, Manavgat =

Kızılot
- Neighbourhood
- Location in Turkey
- Coordinates: 36.7156°N 31.5649°E
- Country: Turkey
- Province: Antalya
- District: Manavgat
- Population (2022): 1,874
- Time zone: UTC+3 (TRT)

Kızılot is a neighbourhood in the municipality and district of Manavgat, Antalya Province, Turkey. Its population is 1,874 (2022). Before the 2013 reorganisation, it was a town (belde).
