= Sarayönü =

- District and municipality
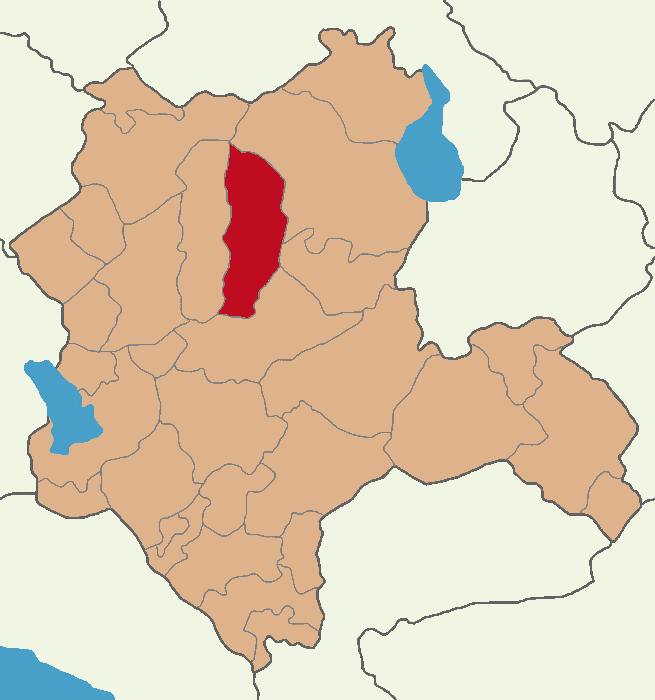
- Map showing Sarayönü District in Konya Province

- Location in Turkey Sarayönü (Turkey Central Anatolia)
- Coordinates: 38°15′58″N 32°24′23″E
- Country: Turkey
- Province: Konya

Government
  - Mayor: Necati Koç (YRP)
- Area: 1,620 km^{2} (630 sq mi)
- Elevation: 1,050 m (3,440 ft)
- Population (2022): 27,771
  - Density: 17/km^{2} (44/sq mi)
- Time zone: UTC+3 (TRT)
- Area code: 0332
- Website: www.sarayonu.bel.tr

Sarayönü is a municipality and district of Konya Province, Turkey. Its area is 1,620 km^{2}, and its population is 27,771 (2022). The town occupies the location of the ancient Laodicea Combusta.

== Composition ==
There are 26 neighbourhoods in Sarayönü District:

- Bahçesaray
- Başhüyük
- Batıistasyon
- Boyalı
- Büyükzengi
- Çeşmelisebil
- Değirmenli
- Doğuistasyon
- Ertugrul
- Fatih
- Gözlü
- Hatip
- İnli
- Kadıoğlu
- Karabıyık
- Karatepe
- Kayıören
- Konar
- Kurşunlu
- Kuyulusebil
- Ladik
- Özkent
- Saraç
- Selimiye
- Yenicekaya
- Yukarı
