= Bayraklı =

- District and municipality
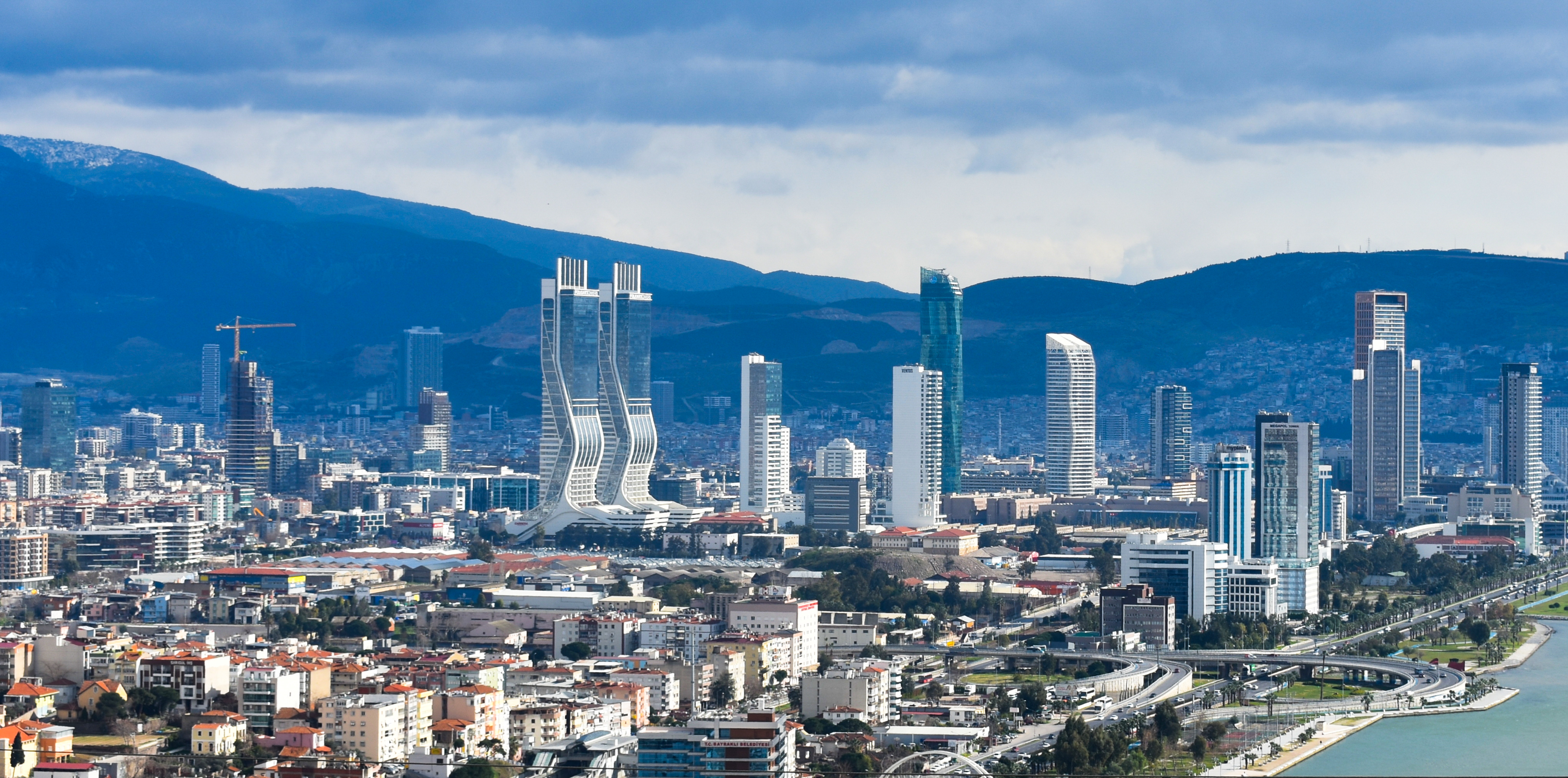

- Logo

- Map showing Bayraklı District in İzmir Province

- Location within Turkey Location within İzmir
- Coordinates: 38°27′44″N 27°10′0″E
- Country: Turkey
- Province: İzmir

Government
  - Mayor: İrfan Önal (CHP)
- Area: 30 km^{2} (12 sq mi)
- Elevation: 86 m (282 ft)
- Population (2024): 299,859
  - Density: 10,000/km^{2} (26,000/sq mi)
- Time zone: UTC+3 (TRT)
- Area code: 0232
- Website: www.bayrakli.bel.tr

Bayraklı is a municipality and district of İzmir Province, Turkey. Its area is 30 km^{2}, and its population is 299,859 (2024). It covers the northern part of the metropolitan area of İzmir. The district of Bayraklı was created in 2008 from part of the district of Karşıyaka.

== Composition ==
There are 24 neighbourhoods in Bayraklı District:

- 75. Yıl
- Adalet
- Alparslan
- Bayraklı
- Çay
- Cengizhan
- Çiçek
- Doğançay
- Emek
- Fuat Edip Baksi
- Gümüşpala
- Körfez
- Manavkuyu
- Mansuroğlu
- Muhittin Erener
- Onur
- Org. Nafiz Gürman
- Osman Gazi
- Postacılar
- Refik Şevket Ince
- Soğukkuyu
- Tepekule
- Turan
- Yamanlar

== See also ==
- Bayraklı Tunnels
