= European route E87 =

Road in trans-European E-road network

E87

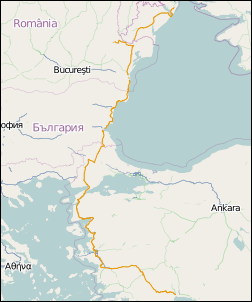

Major junctions
- North end: Odesa, Ukraine
- South end: Antalya, Turkey

Location
- Countries: Ukraine; Moldova; Romania; Bulgaria; Turkey

Highway system
- International E-road network; A Class; B Class

European route E 87 is part of the United Nations international E-road network. It is an important north–south road on the coast of Black Sea, running from Odesa (Ukraine), Tulcea (Romania), Constanţa (Romania), Varna (Bulgaria), Burgas (Bulgaria), Çanakkale (Turkey), İzmir (Turkey) to Antalya (Turkey).

== Route ==
Ukraine

- M 15: Odesa ( E58 E95) - Mayaky

Moldova

- R 52: Palanca

Ukraine

- M 15: Udobne - Izmail - Reni

Moldova

- M 3: Giurgiulești ( E584)

Romania

- DN2B: Galaţi - Brăila ( E584)
- DN22: Brăila ( E584) - Măcin - Isaccea - Tulcea - Babadag - Tariverde - Ovidiu ( E60)
- DN2A: Ovidiu ( E60) - Constanţa ( E60 E81)
- DN39: Constanţa - Eforie Nord ( E675) - Eforie Sud - Mangalia

Bulgaria

- I-9: Shabla - Kavarna - Balchik - Varna ( E70)
- A 5: Varna - Priseltsi
- I-9: Priseltsi - Byala - Obzor - Nesebar - Pomorie - Burgas ( E773) - Marinka - Zvezdec - Malko Tarnovo

Turkey

- D.555: Dereköy - Kırklareli - Babaeski ( E80)
- D.100: Babaeski - Havsa
- D.550: Havsa - Uzunköprü - Keşan ( E84, Start of Concurrency with E90) - Gelibolu (End of concurrency with E90) - Eceabat
- : Eceabat - Çanakkale
- D.550: Çanakkale - Ayvalık - Menemen
- O-30: Menemen - İzmir ( E96 E881)
- O-31: İzmir - Selçuk - Aydın - Denizli
- D.320: Denizli - Honaz
- D.585: Honaz - Acıpayam - Söğüt
- D.350: Söğüt - Korkuteli - Antalya
