= Gaziemir =

- District and municipality
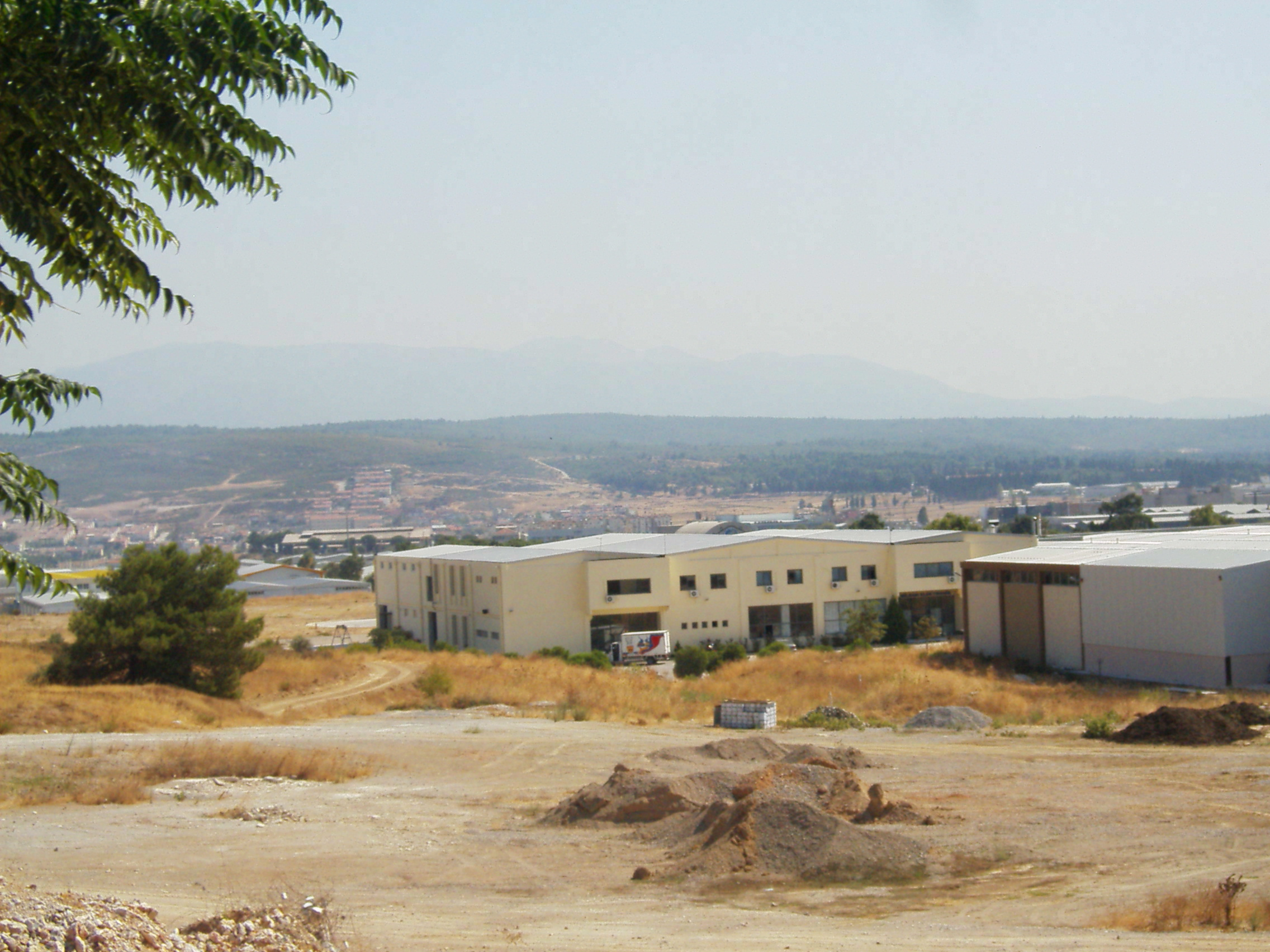

- Map showing Gaziemir District in İzmir Province

- Location within Turkey Location within İzmir
- Coordinates: 38°19′17″N 27°07′39″E
- Country: Turkey
- Province: İzmir

Government
  - Mayor: Ünal Işık (CHP)
- Area: 70 km^{2} (27 sq mi)
- Elevation: 114 m (374 ft)
- Population (2022): 137,754
  - Density: 2,000/km^{2} (5,100/sq mi)
- Time zone: UTC+3 (TRT)
- Postal code: 35980
- Area code: 0232
- Website: www.gaziemir.bel.tr

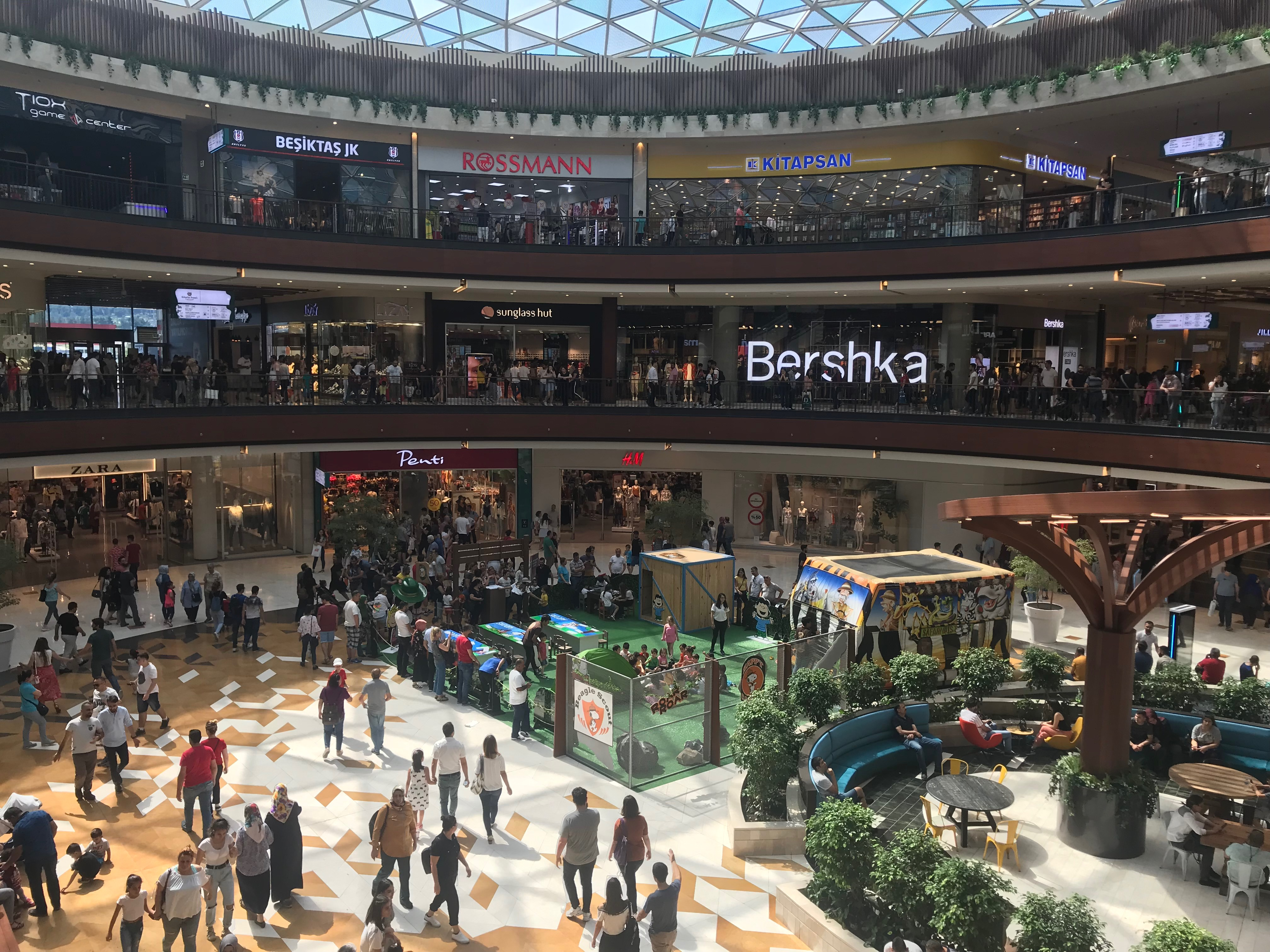
A view of the interior of İzmir Optimum in Gaziemir, İzmir.

Gaziemir is a municipality and district of İzmir Province, Turkey. Its area is 70 km^{2}, and its population is 137,754 (2022). It is situated to the south of central İzmir (Konak) on the road into town. İzmir Adnan Menderes International Airport is situated within the boundaries of the district, as is the Aegean Free Zone export processing industrial park, which is also home to the third space camp in the world, Space Camp Turkey.

== History ==
Gaziemir was founded in the 14th century by Umur Beg (Ghazi Umur, called Umur Pasha in Ottoman sources) of the dynasty of the Beylik of Aydin, who had brought and settled Yörük clans from Konya to the region. The first mention in Ottoman records dates from 1530 and the settlement was named Seydiköy in honor of a Yörük chief, Seydi Ahmed, whose tomb still stands.

The town's evolution can be traced fairly smoothly through the centuries by means of regular references in Ottoman sources. In a diary entry dated November 26, 1670, John Covel, the Levant Company chaplain at İzmir (then known in English by its Greek name of Smyrna), notes that the town of Seydoköy (rendered Sedjagui in the diary) was the site of several country houses owned by European diplomats, including the Dutch Consul Jacques van Dam and the English Consul and writer Paul Rycaut, whose house Covel visited.

After the 17th century, in line with the general pace of development in fertile western Anatolian valleys based on olive/figs/raisin/cotton exports and the ensuing population movements from the Aegean Islands, Seydiköy was largely settled by Greeks who came to constitute a large majority as of the second half of the 19th century.

The Greek population was exchanged after the Greco-Turkish War (1919-1922) in the frame of the Exchange of populations between Greece and Turkey, and was replaced by Turkish immigrants from Kavala region as well as from Bulgaria. Seydiköy became a municipality in 1926 and was renamed Gaziemir in 1965 in reference to the original founder, Gazi Umur Bey. In 1992, Gaziemir became a district that also includes the former municipality of Sarnıç which was a part of Konak district.

== Gaziemir today ==
Always a hub of crafts and industry both for İzmir and nationally, Gaziemir today has a highly developed industrial basis, with modern residential areas surrounding production and sales centers. The furniture industry (both home furniture and office furniture) is particularly developed. Companies established within the Aegean Free Zone generally focus on export processing, while the presence of such Turkish or international outlets as Migros Türk, Kipa (a Tesco joint-venture) and Metro AG Optimum Outlet subsidiaries makes Gaziemir one the important retail centers of İzmir.

== Economy ==
The airline IZair, which operated from June 2006 to December 2018 was headquartered in Gaziemir, on the grounds of Adnan Menderes Airport.

== Composition ==
There are 17 neighbourhoods in Gaziemir District:

- 9 Eylül
- Aktepe
- Atatürk
- Atıfbey
- Beyazevler
- Binbaşı Reşat Bey
- Emrez
- Fatih
- Gazi
- Gazikent
- Hürriyet
- Irmak
- Menderes
- Sevgi
- Sarnıç
- Yeşil
- Zafer

== See also ==
- Adnan Menderes International Airport
- Space Camp Turkey
