= Torbalı =

- District and municipality
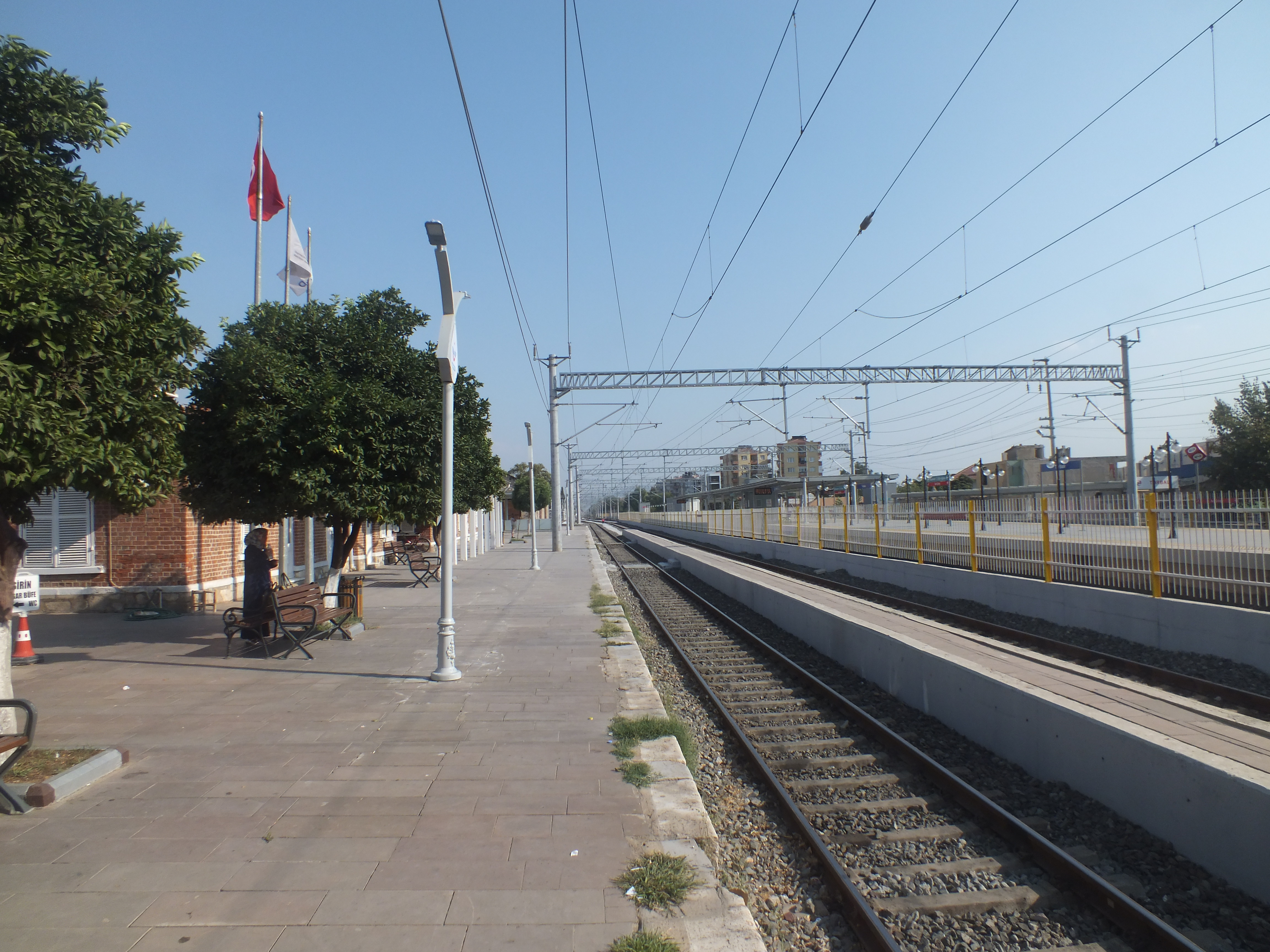
- Torbalı train station

- Logo

- Map showing Torbalı District in İzmir Province

- Location within Turkey Location within İzmir
- Coordinates: 38°09′43″N 27°21′30″E
- Country: Turkey
- Province: İzmir

Government
  - Mayor: Mithat Tekin (CHP)
- Area: 577 km^{2} (223 sq mi)
- Population (2022): 207,840
  - Density: 360/km^{2} (933/sq mi)
- Time zone: UTC+3 (TRT)
- Area code: 0232
- Website: www.torbali.bel.tr

Torbalı (Turkish pronunciation: ['toɾbaɫɯ]) is a municipality and district of İzmir Province, Turkey. Its area is 577 km^{2}, and its population is 207,840 (2022).

An ancient Ionian city, Metropolis, is found in the district. It was famous for its wines and religious sites, and had three sanctuaries in marble dedicated to the Roman Emperor Augustus and his foster child Germanicus, in an ancient theatre which dominates the valley.

Pieces of art found during the excavations are now exhibited in İzmir and Ephesus museums. The town has the remains of an old port and a few holiday complexes, and is set attractively against a pine forest.

== Composition ==
There are 60 neighbourhoods in Torbalı District:

- 19 Mayıs
- Ahmetli
- Alpkent
- Arslanlar
- Atalan
- Atatürk
- Ayrancılar
- Bahçelievler
- Bozköy
- Bülbüldere
- Çakırbeyli
- Çamlıca
- Çapak
- Çaybaşı
- Cumhuriyet
- Dağkızılca
- Dağteke
- Demirci
- Dirmil
- Düverlik
- Eğerci
- Ertuğrul
- Fevziçakmak
- Gazi Mustafa Kemal
- Göllüce
- Helvacı
- İnönü
- İstiklal
- Kaplancık
- Karakızlar
- Karakuyu
- Karaot
- Karşıyaka
- Kazım Karabekir
- Kırbaş
- Kuşçuburun
- Muratbey
- Mustafa Kemal Atatürk
- Naime
- Ormanköy
- Ortaköy
- Özbey
- Pamukyazı
- Pancar
- Sağlık
- Saipler
- Şehitler
- Subaşı
- Taşkesik
- Tepeköy
- Torbalı
- Tulum
- Türkmenköy
- Yazıbaşı
- Yedi Eylül
- Yemişlik
- Yeniköy
- Yenimahalle
- Yeşilköy
- Yoğurtçular

== Excavations ==
In June 2021, archaeologists announced the discovery of a well-preserved 1,800-year-old marble statue of a woman standing on a pedestal in Torbalı district. The head and two arms of the statue were missing.

== Economy ==
BR Mağazacılık, a division of Boyner Group, manufactures and retails the brands Altınyıldız Classics and Beymen Business, and is headquartered in Torbalı.
