= State road D.550 (Turkey) =

Road in Turkey

D.550

Route information
- Part of E87 / E90
- Length: 774 km (481 mi)

Major junctions
- North end: Edirne
- South end: Muğla

Location
- Country: Turkey

Highway system
- Highways in Turkey; Motorways; List; State Highways; List

D.550 is a north-to-south state road in Turkey. It runs mostly along the west coast of Turkey. It starts at Edirne and ends in Muğla. The first 226 kilometres (140 mi) of the road are in the European part of Turkey. Between Eceabat and Çanakkale, it passes over the Strait of Çanakkale (popularly known as Dardanelles) by ferryboat. The rest of the road is in the Asiatic (so called Anatolia) portion of Turkey. Being a north to east road it crosses the major west to east roads in Turkey like D.200 in Çanakkale and D.400 in İzmir. It shares the same itinerary with D.100 between Edirne and Havsa at the north and the same itinerary with D.400 between Yatağan and Muğla at the south.

== Itinerary ==
Province	Location	Distance from Edirne (km)	Distance from Edirne (mile)	Distance from Muğla (km)	Distance from Muğla (mile)
Edirne
Edirne	Edirne	0	0	774	481
Edirne	Havsa	27	17	747	464
Edirne	Uzunköprü	111	69	663	412
Edirne	Keşan	153	95	621	386
Çanakkale
Çanakkale	Gelibolu	181	112	593	368
Çanakkale	Eceabat	226	140	548	341
Çanakkale	Çanakkale	227	141	547	340
Çanakkale	Ezine	276	170	500	311
Çanakkale	Ayvacık	298	185	476	296
Balıkesir
Balıkesir	Edremit	360	224	414	257
Balıkesir	Burhaniye	372	231	402	250
Balıkesir	Ayvalık	401	249	373	232
İzmir
İzmir	Dikili junction	437	272	337	209
İzmir	Aliağa	494	307	280	174
İzmir	Menemen	522	325	252	157
İzmir	İzmir	549	341	225	140
İzmir	Torbalı	598	371	176	109
İzmir	Selçuk	629	391	145	90
Aydın
Aydın	Germencik	653	406	121	75
Aydın	Aydın	675	419	99	62
Aydın	Çine	711	442	63	39
Muğla
Muğla	Yatağan junction	748	465	26	16
Muğla	Muğla	774	481	0	0
