= Balçova =

- District and municipality
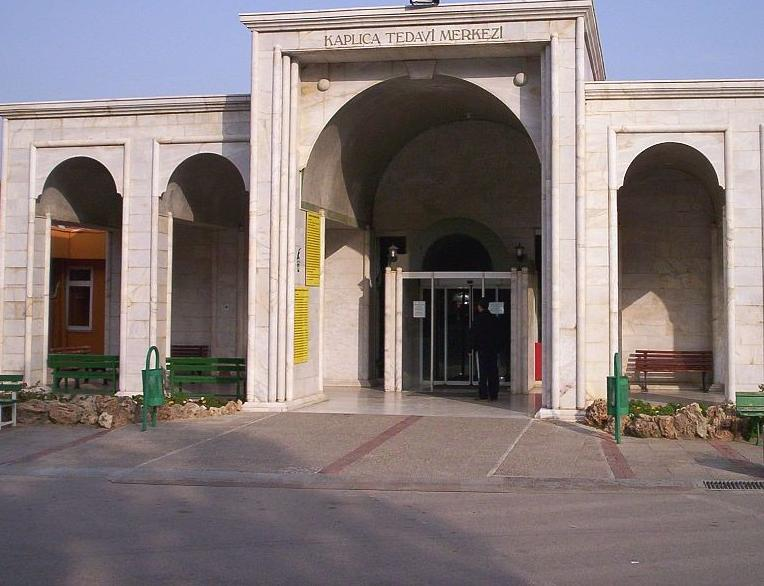
- Entry gate of the thermal baths associated with Agamemnon in Balçova

- Map showing Balçova District in İzmir Province

- Location within Turkey Location within İzmir
- Coordinates: 38°23′08″N 27°03′29″E
- Country: Turkey
- Province: İzmir

Government
  - Mayor: Onur Yiğit (CHP)
- Area: 16 km^{2} (6.2 sq mi)
- Population (2022): 80,721
  - Density: 5,000/km^{2} (13,000/sq mi)
- Time zone: UTC+3 (TRT)
- Postal code: 35980
- Area code: 0232
- Website: www.balcova.bel.tr

Balçova is a municipality and district of İzmir Province, Turkey. Its area is 16 km^{2}, and its population is 80,721 (2022). It covers the western part of the Greater Metropolitan Area of İzmir. Balçova is a fully urbanized at the rate of 100 percent. Balçova district area follows the southern coastline of the inner Gulf of İzmir, on the road to Çeşme and is at a distance of 8 km (5 mi) to the west from the traditional center of İzmir (Konak), which it borders on the east. Balçova district further neighbors the district area Narlıdere to the south and the west, both of its neighbors being among İzmir's metropolitan districts. Balçova district's overall levels of education are among the highest in Turkey, the literacy rate reaching 98 per cent, while the calculations for average yearly income per inhabitant situate it slightly below the national average, at 4.327 US Dollars, for which its open approach to outside immigration may have played a role. The overall appearance of Balçova leaves the impression of a locality where people are generally educated and who subsist on mid-revenues. The economy is largely based on commerce and tourism, its three shopping malls constituting the backbone for the first range of activities, and its thermal baths for the second. New housing projects putting Balçova's advantageous location to benefit and generally aimed at mid- to higher- income residents started to be built in recent years and as such, Balçova became in recent years one of İzmir's metropolitan districts where the economy grew the fastest. Balçova is home to İzmir University of Economics.

== Agamemnon Baths ==
The thermal baths have been famous since antiquity and were known as the Baths of Agamemnon and Thermal Springs of Agamemnon and Agamemnoneia (Ἀγαμεμνόνεια; "of Agamemnon"). According to tradition, many of Agamemnon's soldiers bathed there after an oracle advised them to do so following a battle. The healing waters restored them so completely that they no longer required the services of the physician Podalirius. The baths subsequently flourished and, as a mark of their renown, came to bear the name of Agamemnon. An epigram in the Greek Anthology praises the Agamemnon Baths. Aelius Aristides had also frequently resorted in the baths and had reported that it was here that Asclepius had first began to prophesy.

A number of sulfurous hot springs rise in and around a small stream, which previously dried up in summer, but which is now kept in service all year round thanks to modern installations centered around a five-star hotel. The waters, of a temperature of to 160 degrees Fahrenheit, are considered good for rheumatism, sciatica, gallstones and eczema. The baths remain extremely popular both by themselves and by the thermal establishment's having extended its range of activities also in the field of congress and exhibition tourism. (Note: In his 1966 archaeological guide on Aegean Turkey, George E. Bean, who remains one of the foremost references for the region, notes that, on the signpost for the baths, Agamemnon had become "Ağamemnun" (literally, "the agha is contented" in Turkish), adding, in time, no doubt, he would become "Memnun Ağa".)

== Visitor attractions ==
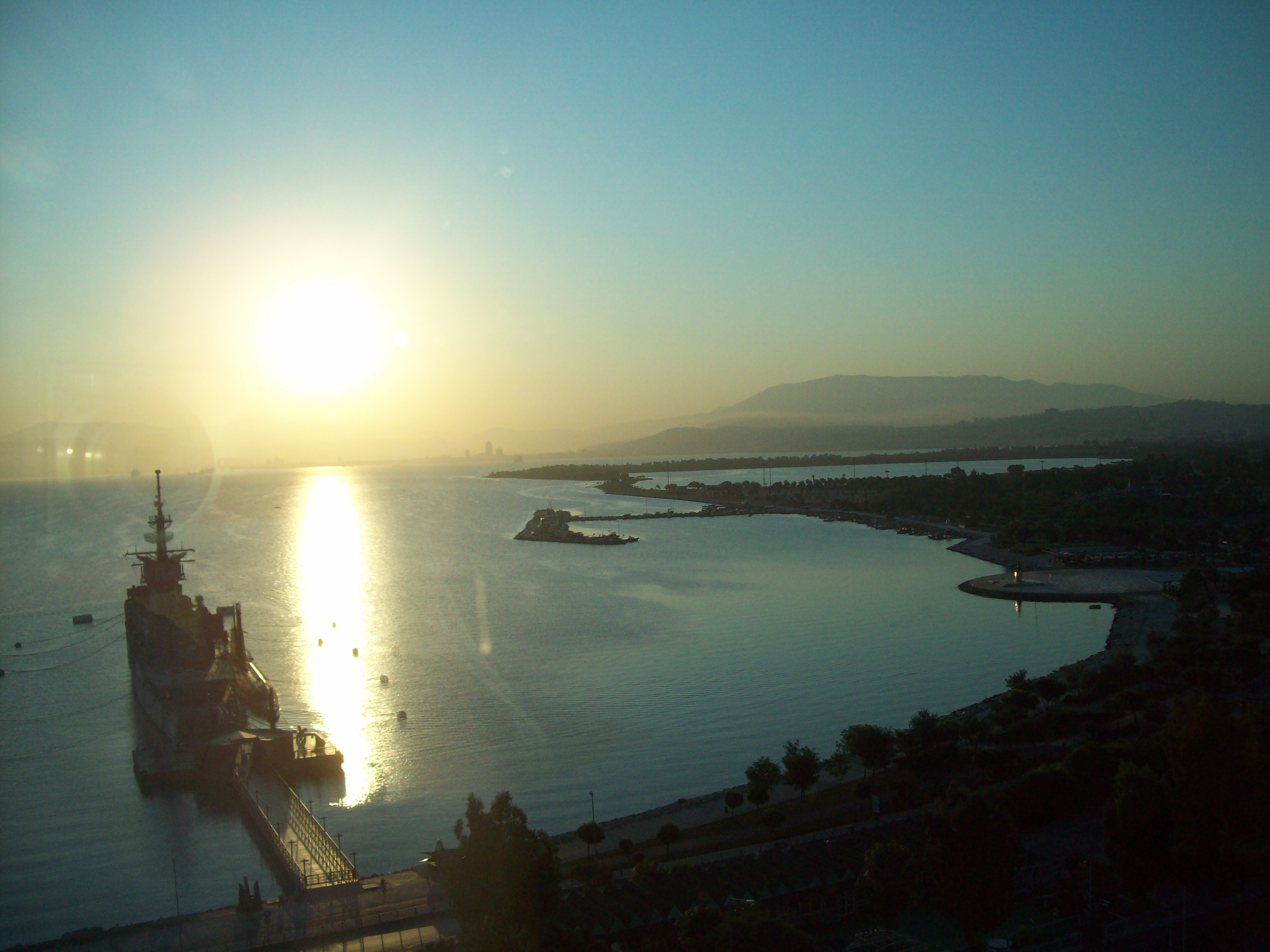
Sea museum and İzmir bay from Inciralti, Balçova

Two decommissioned ships of the Turkish Navy, a submarine and a frigate, are the main attractions of the İnciralti Sea Museum. The Balçova Gondola operates on a nearby hill.

== Composition ==
There are 8 neighbourhoods in Balçova District:

- Bahçelerarası
- Çetin Emeç
- Eğitim
- Fevziçakmak
- İnciraltı
- Korutürk
- Onur
- Teleferik
