= Köseköy railway station =

Railway station in Kartepe, Turkey

KÖSEKÖY

General information
- Location: Bozkır Sk., Çayırköy Mah. 41250; Kartepe, Kocaeli; Turkey
- Coordinates: 40.7490°N 30.0062°E
- System: TCDD Taşımacılık regional rail station
- Owner: Turkish State Railways
- Operator: TCDD Taşımacılık
- Line: Istanbul-Ankara railway
- Platforms: 3 (2 island platforms, 1 side platform)
- Tracks: 6

Construction
- Structure type: At-grade
- Parking: Yes

History
- Opened: 1975
- Closed: 2012-18
- Electrified: 6 February 1977; 25 kV AC, 50 Hz

Services
Preceding station	TCDD Taşımacılık	Following station
İzmit towards Gebze	Ada Express	Büyükderbent towards Adapazarı
Former services
Preceding station	Turkish State Railways	Following station
Kırkikievler towards Istanbul	Adapazarı Express	Büyükderbent towards Adapazarı
Location

Köseköy railway station (Turkish: Köseköy istasyonu) is a railway station in Kartepe, Turkey, in the İzmit metropolitan area. TCDD Taşımacılık operates four daily regional trains between Istanbul and Adapazarı that stop at the station. The station was originally built in 1975 by the Turkish State Railways, when the Istanbul-Ankara railway was realigned to bypass İzmit's city center. The Köseköy Logistics Center is located adjacent to the station and is an important freight yard on the railway.

Köseköy station was closed down on 1 February 2012 due to construction of the Ankara-Istanbul high-speed railway. The station was reopened in 2018.
