= Kartal railway station =

Railway station in Kartal, Istanbul, Turkey

Kartal
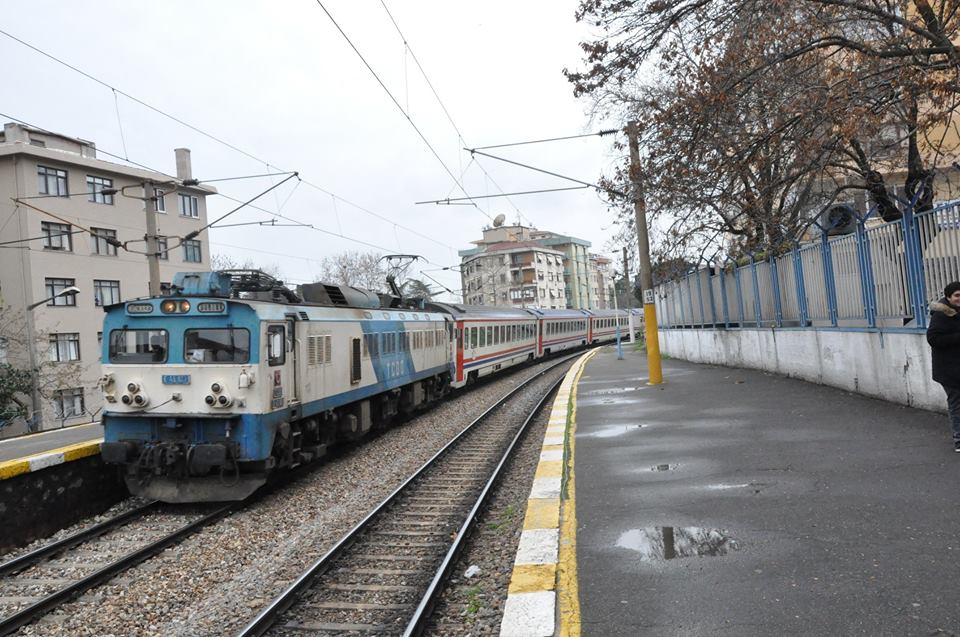
- The Boğaziçi Express, en route to Ankara, passing through Kartal station in 2011.

General information
- Location: Hükümet Cd., Yukarı Mah. 34860; Kartal, Istanbul; Turkey
- Coordinates: 40.8878°N 29.1834°E
- System: TCDD Taşımacılık commuter rail station
- Owner: Turkish State Railways
- Operator: TCDD Taşımacılık
- Line: Istanbul-Ankara railway
- Platforms: 2 (1 island platform, 1 side platform)
- Tracks: 3

Construction
- Structure type: At-grade
- Parking: No

History
- Opened: 22 September 1872
- Closed: 2013-18
- Rebuilt: 1949 (expanded); 2017-18 (platforms)
- Electrified: 6 February 1977; 25 kV AC, 50 Hz

Services
Preceding station	TCDD Taşımacılık	Following station
Başak towards Halkalı	Marmaray	Yunus towards Gebze
Former services
Preceding station	Turkish State Railways	Following station
Maltepe towards Istanbul	Adapazarı Express	Pendik towards Adapazarı
Atalar towards Haydarpaşa	Haydarpaşa suburban	Yunus towards Gebze
Track layout
Location

Kartal railway station (Turkish: Kartal istasyonu) is a railway station in Kartal, Istanbul. The station was a stop on the Haydarpaşa suburban between 1951 and 2013, when the railway between Haydarpaşa and Pendik was closed. The station reopened to Marmaray commuter rail service on 12 March 2019. Prior to 2012, Kartal station was also a stop on the popular Adapazarı Express regional rail service to Adapazarı.

== History ==
Kartal station was originally built by the Ottoman government as part of a railway from Kadıköy to İzmit. The station was opened on 22 September 1872. The station, along with the railway, was sold to the Ottoman Anatolian Railway (CFOA) in 1888, which operated the station until 1924. In 1909 the CFOA began frequent train service between Haydarpaşa and Pendik; this promoted urban growth around the railway and Kartal station became the center of Kartal.

In 1924, the CFOA went through a process of nationalization by the newly formed Republic of Turkey. In that year, the CFOA was bought by the Turkish government and merged with the Baghdad Railway into the Anatolian—Baghdad Railways (CFAB). In 1927, the CFAB was bought by the State Railways and Seaports Administration, the direct successor of the Turkish State Railways.

The State Railways double-tracked the railway from Haydarpaşa to Gebze in 1949 and in 1951 began commuter rail service on the line. The station was electrified in 1969 with overhead wire, when TCDD began operating electric commuter rail service. Regional rail service was discontinued in 2012, followed by all train service in 2013 for the construction of the Marmaray commuter rail system. The rails were torn up shortly after but construction halted due to problems with the contractor. Construction restarted in 2016 with the demolition of the station platforms. Kartal station was reopened on March 12, 2019, along with the entire Marmaray rail line.
