= Yunus railway station =

Railway station in Istanbul, Turkey

Yunus

General information
- Location: Tercümen Cd., Yunus Mah., 34873; Kartal, Istanbul; Turkey
- Coordinates: 40.8847°N 29.2101°E
- System: TCDD Taşımacılık commuter rail station
- Owner: Turkish State Railways
- Line: Istanbul-Ankara railway
- Platforms: 1 island platform
- Tracks: 3
- Connections: İETT Bus: 16, 16A,16D, 17, 132, 132A, 132B, 132D, 132E, 132F, 132K, 132P, 133A, 133AK, 133AP, 133K, 133KT, 133Ş, 133T, E-9, KM10, KM28, KM34; Istanbul Minibus: Kadıköy–Pendik

Construction
- Structure type: At-grade
- Accessible: Yes

History
- Opened: 22 September 1872
- Closed: 2012-18
- Rebuilt: 2013-14
- Electrified: 29 May 1969; 25 kV AC, 60 Hz

Passengers
- 2016: 0 0%

Services
Preceding station	TCDD Taşımacılık	Following station
Kartal towards Halkalı	Marmaray	Pendik towards Gebze
Former services
Preceding station	Turkish State Railways	Following station
Kartal towards Haydarpaşa	Haydarpaşa suburban	Pendik towards Gebze
Track layout
Location

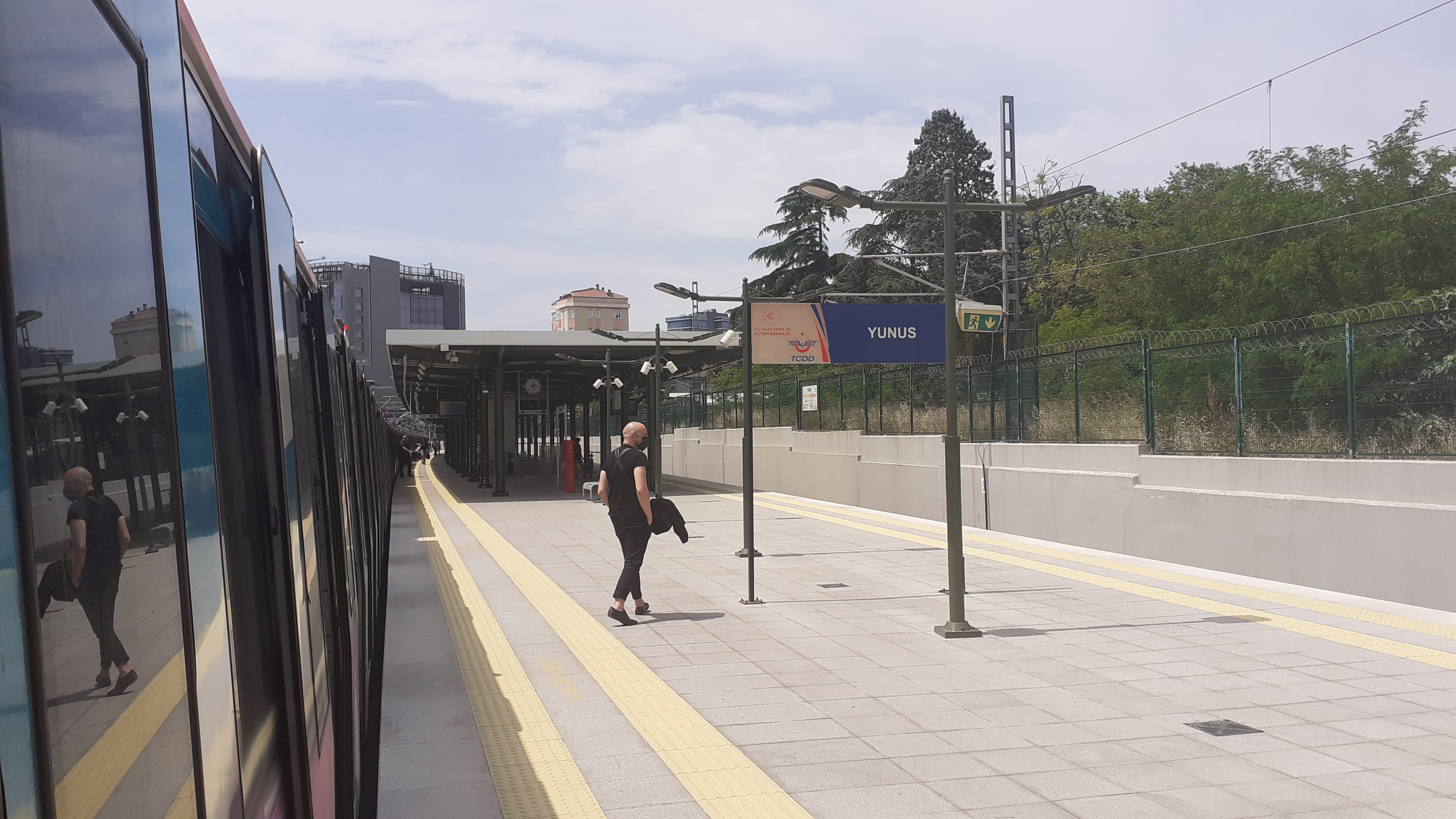
Yunus train platform.

Yunus railway station (Turkish: Yunus istasyonu) is a railway station in Kartal, Istanbul on the Marmaray commuter rail line. It is located on Tercüme Avenue, one block north of Çetin Emeç Boulevard on the coast and is the easternmost station in Kartal.

The original station was opened on 22 September 1872 by the Ottoman government, as part of the railway from Kadıköy to İzmit. In 1949, the station was rebuilt and expanded to two side platforms, serving two tracks. Commuter rail service from Haydarpaşa to Gebze began in 1951 and the station was electrified in 1969. The station closed down in 2013 for the construction of the new Marmaray rail project and was demolished shortly after. In 2016, the current station was built as an island platform serving two tracks, with a third express track on the south side. Yunus station was reopened by March 12, 2019.
