= Başak railway station =

Railway station in Istanbul, Turkey

BAŞAK
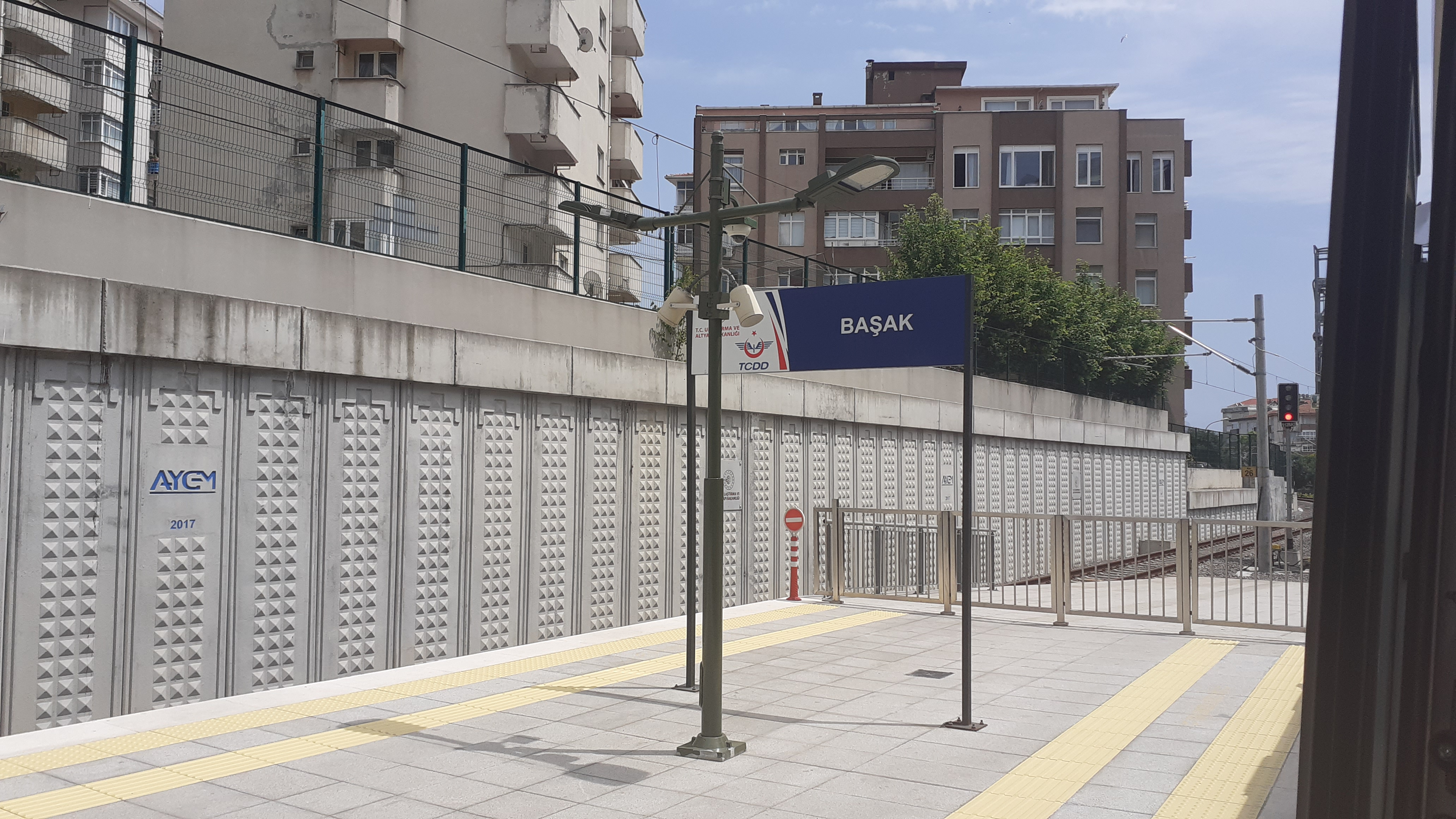

General information
- Location: Neyzen Tevfik Cd., Kordonboyu Mah., 34860; Kartal, Istanbul; Turkey
- Coordinates: 40.8904°N 29.1773°E
- System: TCDD Taşımacılık commuter rail station
- Owner: Turkish State Railways
- Line: Istanbul-Ankara railway
- Platforms: 1 island platform
- Tracks: 3
- Connections: İETT Bus: 16, 16A, 16D, 17, 133G, 133N, 133T 133T, 134YK, 252, E-9, KM30, KM34; Istanbul Minibus: Uğur Mumcu–Kadıköy; Istanbul Dolmuş: Bostancı–Pendik

Construction
- Structure type: At-grade
- Accessible: Yes

History
- Opened: 13 March 2019
- Electrified: 25 kV AC, 60 Hz

Services
Preceding station	TCDD Taşımacılık	Following station
Atalar towards Halkalı	Marmaray	Kartal towards Gebze
Location

Başak railway station (Turkish: Başak istasyonu) is a railway station in Kartal, Istanbul on the Marmaray commuter rail line. The station is one of three new stations built on the line along with Ataköy and Darıca.

Başak station consists of an island platform serving two tracks and a third express track on the south side. The station opened on 13 March 2019, together with phase II of the Marmaray project.
