= İzmit railway station =

Railway station in Turkey

İzmit
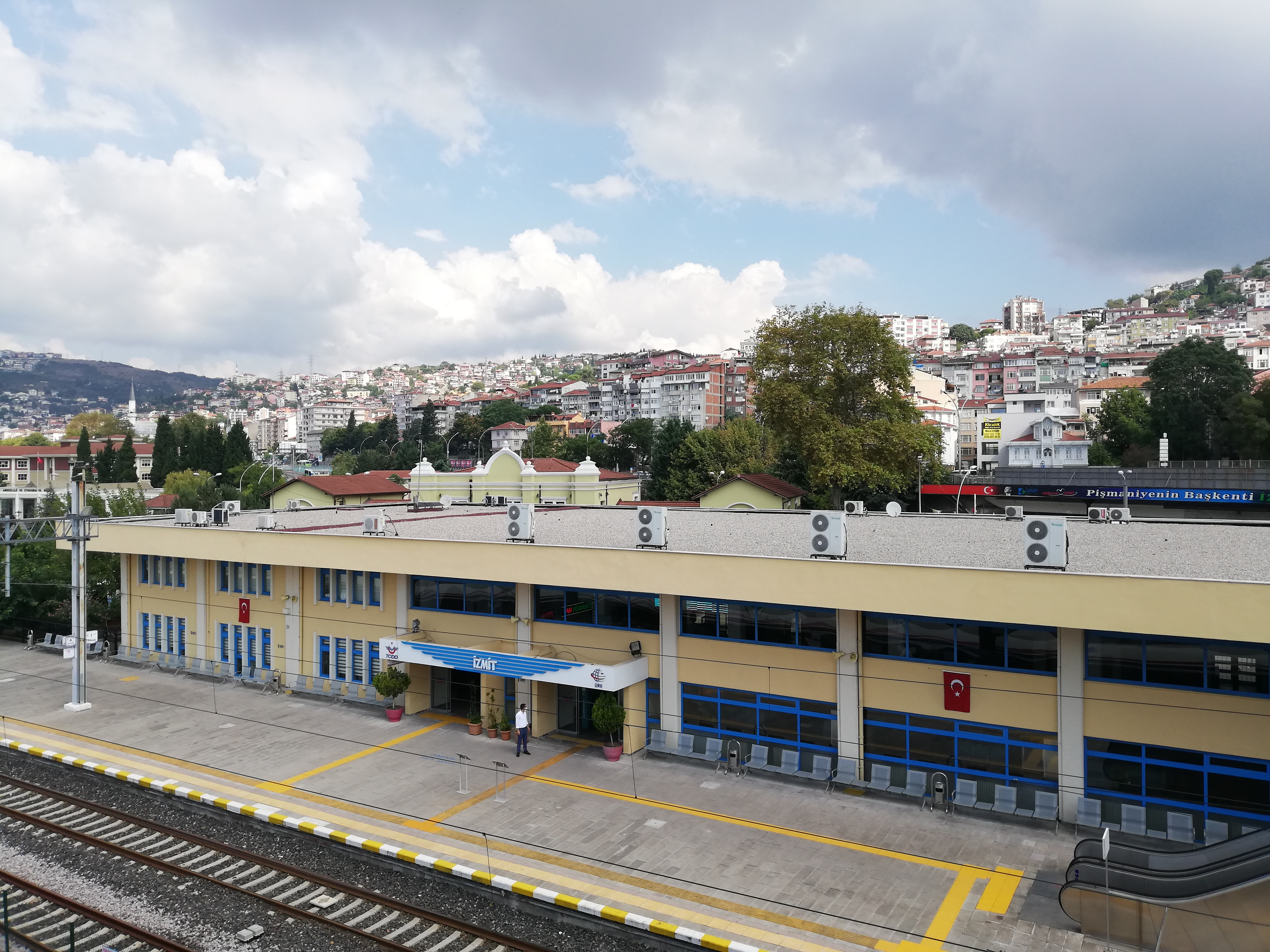
- İzmit railway station in 2020 after renovation.

General information
- Location: Kozluk Mh., İstasyon Cd., 41200 İzmit/Kocaeli, Turkey
- Coordinates: 40.761896°N 29.917224°E
- System: TCDD Taşımacılık high-speed and regional rail station
- Owner: TCDD
- Lines: Istanbul-Ankara railway Ankara-Istanbul high-speed railway
- Platforms: 3
- Tracks: 7

Construction
- Structure type: At-grade
- Parking: Yes
- Accessible: Yes

Other information
- Station code: 1570

History
- Opened: 1 August 1873
- Rebuilt: 1976–77, 2012–14
- Electrified: 6 February 1977

Passengers
- 2009: 912,500 ▲18%

Services
Preceding station	TCDD Taşımacılık	Following station
Gebze towards Istanbul Halkalı	Yüksek Hızlı Tren	Arifiye towards Ankara
Gebze towards Istanbul Halkalı	Yüksek Hızlı Tren	Arifiye towards Karaman
Gebze towards Istanbul Halkalı	Ankara Express	Arifiye towards Ankara
Derince towards Gebze	Ada Express	Köseköy towards Adapazarı
Former services
Preceding station	Turkish State Railways	Following station
Pendik towards Istanbul	Capital Express	Arifiye towards Ankara
Pendik towards Istanbul	Republic Express	Arifiye towards Ankara
Pendik towards Istanbul	Fatih Express	Arifiye towards Ankara
Pendik towards Istanbul	Anatolian Express	Arifiye towards Ankara
Pendik towards Istanbul	Ankara Express	Arifiye towards Ankara
Derince towards Arifiye	Boğaziçi Express	Sapanca towards Ankara
Pendik towards Istanbul	Eskişehir Express	Pelitözü towards Eskişehir
Pendik towards Istanbul	Sakarya Express	Arifiye towards Eskişehir
Kuruçeşme towards Istanbul	Adapazarı Express	Kırkikievler towards Adapazarı
Track layout
Location

Izmit station (Turkish: İzmit garı) is a railway station on the Istanbul-Ankara railway and is the main station in Izmit, Turkey. The station is located on the shore of the Izmit Bay next to the D100 and at the western end of Cumhuriyet avenue.

Izmit station was first opened on 1 August 1873 by the Ottoman government as part of the Constantinople-Izmit railway. The line was then sold to the Anatolian Railway (CFOA) in 1880, which continued to build the line east to Ankara. The Turkish State Railways took over the railway and the station in 1927.
