= Osmangazi railway station =

Osmangazi
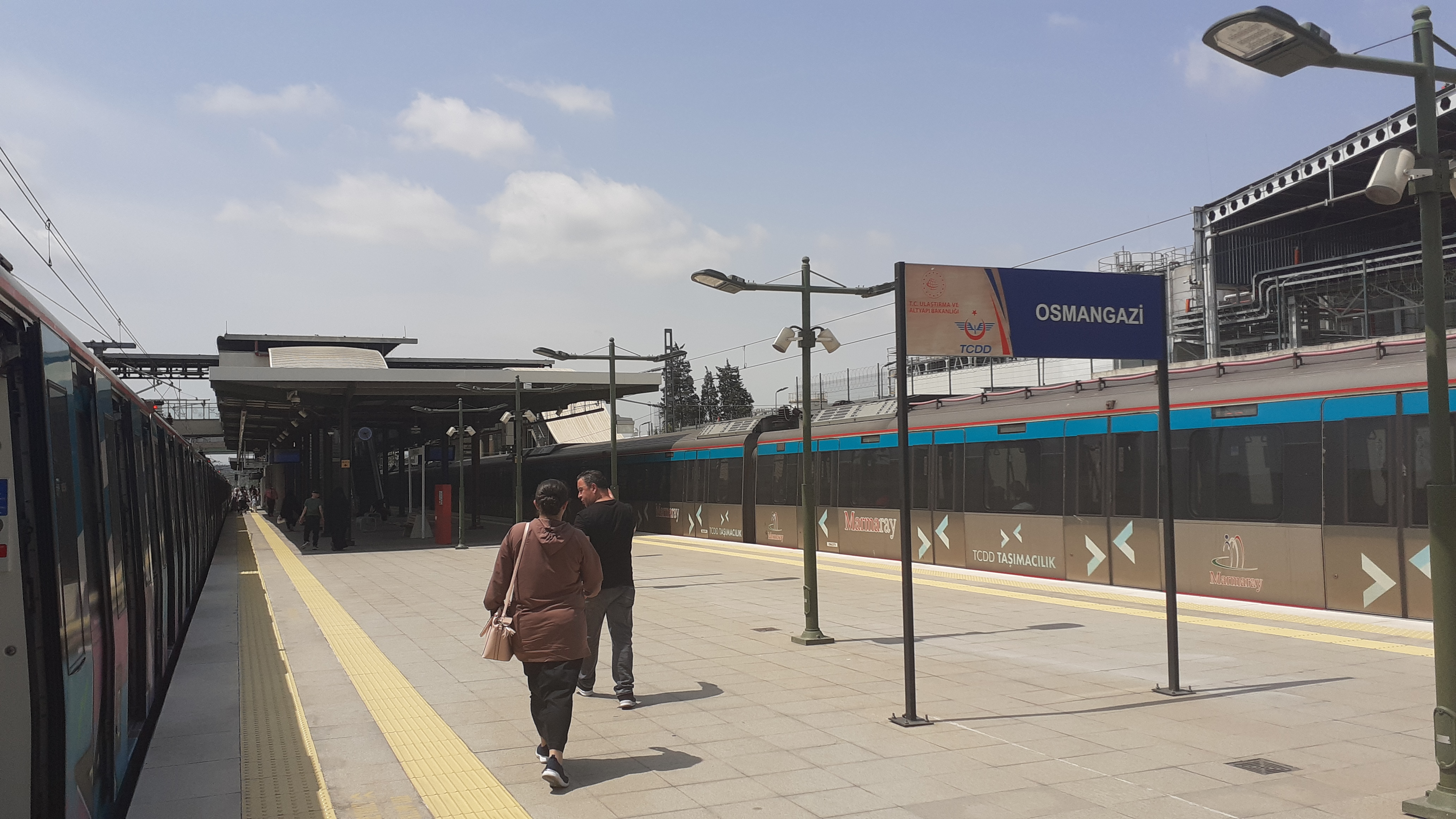

General information
- Location: Çelikoğlu Cd., Sırasöğütler Mah. 41700; Gebze, Kocaeli; Turkey
- Coordinates: 40.7992°N 29.3800°E
- System: TCDD Taşımacılık commuter rail station
- Owner: Turkish State Railways
- Operator: Marmaray
- Line: Istanbul-Ankara railway
- Platforms: 1 island platform
- Tracks: 3

Construction
- Structure type: At-grade
- Accessible: Yes

History
- Opened: 1954
- Closed: 2013-19

Services
Preceding station	TCDD Taşımacılık	Following station
Fatih towards Halkalı	Marmaray	Darıca towards Gebze
Former services
Preceding station	Turkish State Railways	Following station
Fatih towards Haydarpaşa	Haydarpaşa suburban	Gebze Terminus
Track layout
Location

Osmangazi station (Turkish: Osmangazi istasyonu) is a station on the Marmaray commuter rail line in Gebze, Turkey. It was previously a station on the Haydarpaşa suburban until 2013, when commuter rail service was suspended. The original station was opened in 1954 with two side platforms and demolished in 2013. Construction of the new station started shortly after and was structurally completed in 2014, along with the other eight stations located between Pendik and Gebze. Commuter rail service resumed on 13 March 2019.

The station has two tracks with an island platform and one express track on the south side for high-speed and intercity trains.
