= Maltepe railway station =

Maltepe
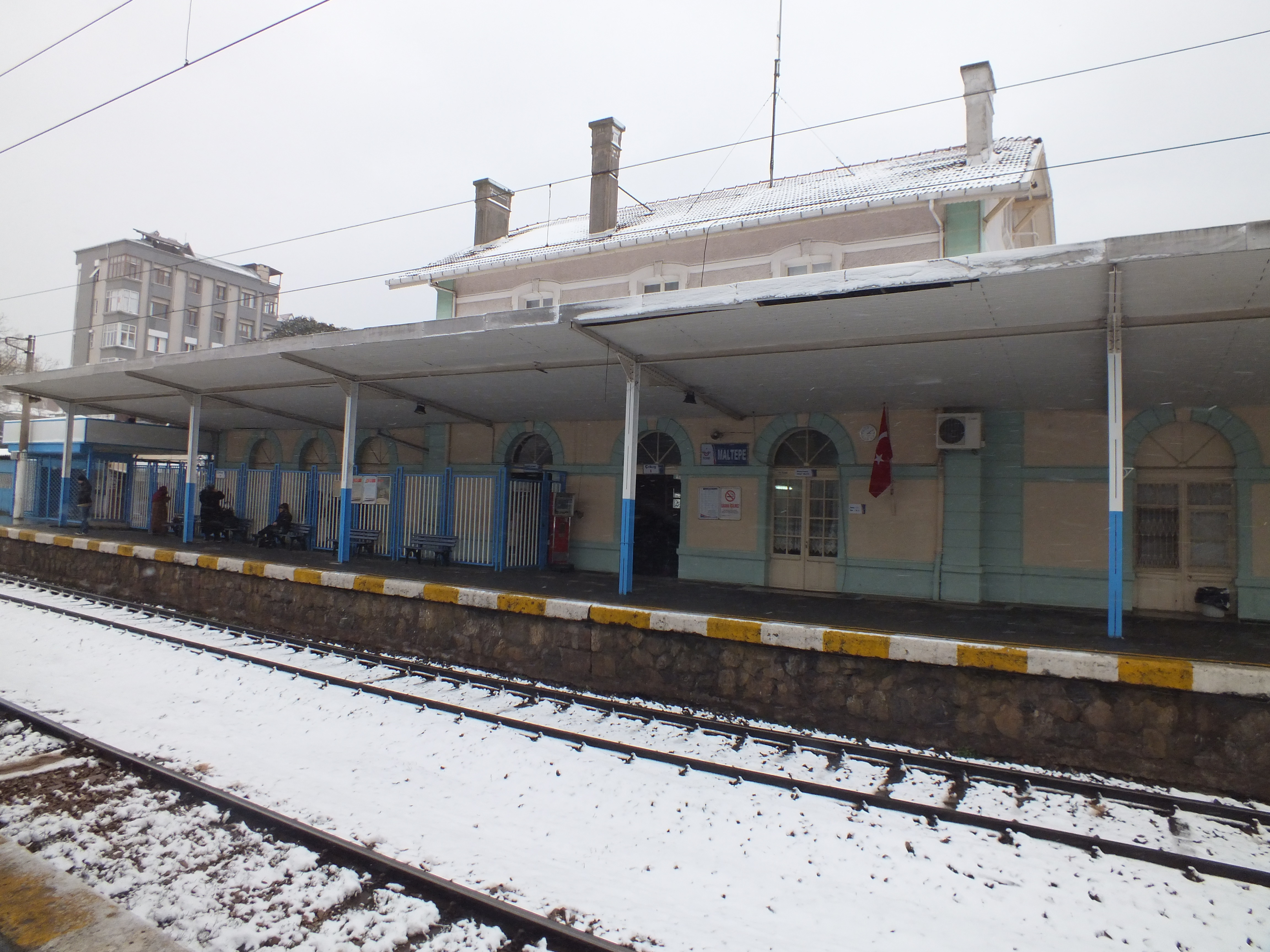
- The station building in the snow.

General information
- Location: İstasyon Cd., Maltepe, Istanbul, Turkey
- Coordinates: 40.920397°N 29.135218°E
- Owner: TCDD
- Line: Istanbul-Ankara railway
- Platforms: 2 (1 island platform, 1 side platform)
- Tracks: 3
- Connections: İETT Bus: Istanbul Minibus:

Construction
- Structure type: At-grade
- Parking: No
- Accessible: Yes

Other information
- Station code: 1560

History
- Opened: 1872
- Rebuilt: 1969
- Electrified: 1969 (25 kV AC)

Services
Preceding station	TCDD Taşımacılık	Following station
Süreyya Plajı towards Halkalı	Marmaray	Cevizli towards Gebze
Former services
Preceding station	Turkish State Railways	Following station
Bostancı towards Istanbul	Adapazarı Express	Kartal towards Adapazarı
Süreyya Plajı towards Haydarpaşa	Haydarpaşa suburban	Cevizli towards Gebze
Location

Maltepe station is located in Maltepe, Istanbul. The station is 14.3 km (8.9 mi) east from Haydarpaşa Terminal and is located directly southeast of the historical city center of Maltepe. The station has 2 platforms for passenger traffic. The Haydarpaşa-Gebze Line and the Haydarpaşa-Adapazarı Regional service the station, as intercity trains skip Maltepe. The station was originally opened in 1872 by the Ottoman Government as part of a railway from Istanbul to İzmit. The government sold the station to the Anatolian Railway in 1888, which was later taken over by the Turkish State Railways in 1927. The station used to be a main freight depot, but when the branch line serving the Maltepe military pier was abandoned freight operations declined greatly.
