= Polatlı railway station =

Railway station in Polatlı

POLATLI
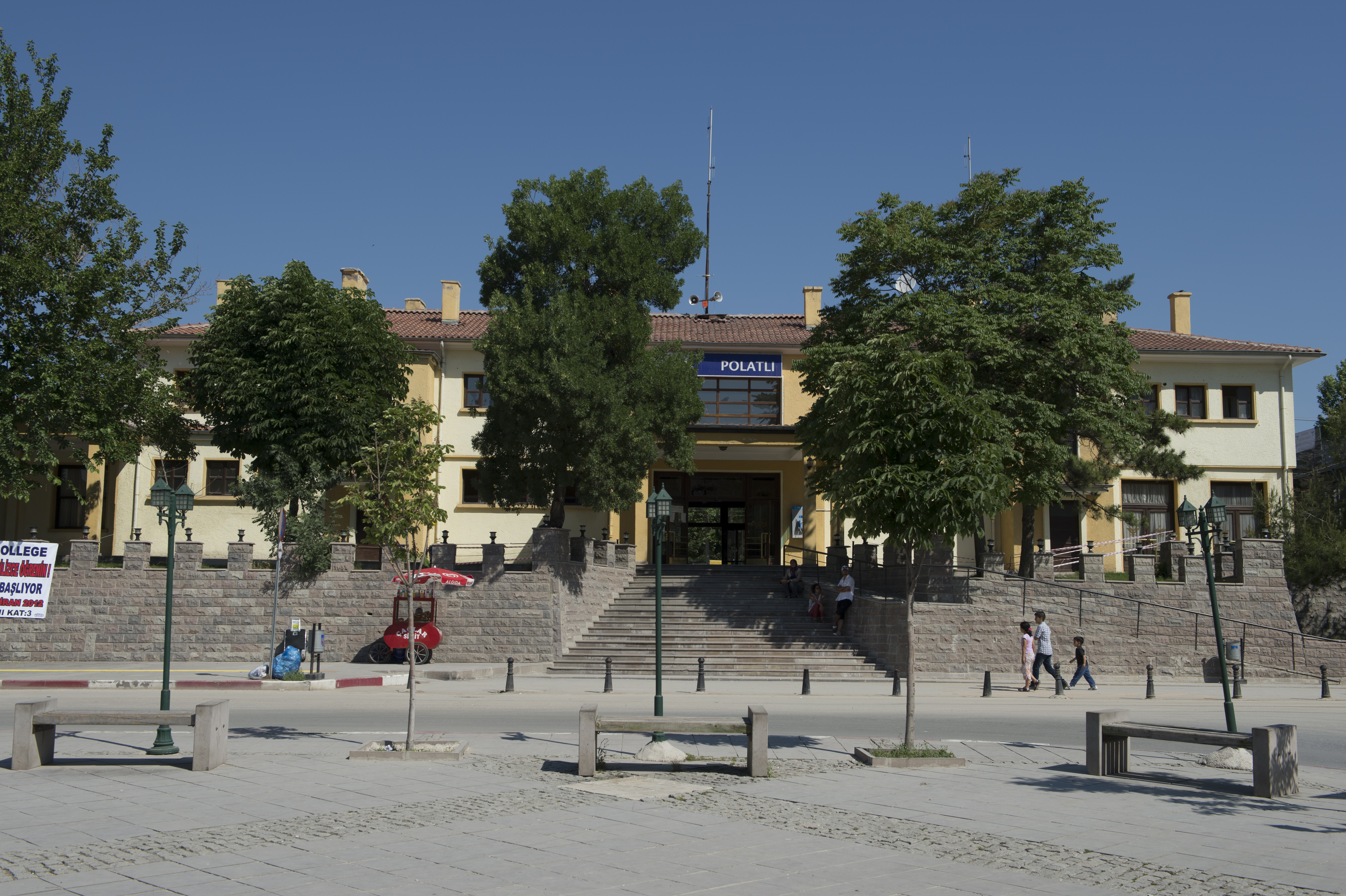
- Polatlı Station in 2012

General information
- Location: Cumhuriyet Mh., Atatürk Cd., 06900 Polatlı/Ankara, Turkey
- Coordinates: 39.585530°N 32.141998°E
- System: TCDD railway station
- Owner: TCDD
- Line: Istanbul-Ankara railway
- Platforms: 1 side platform
- Tracks: 4

Construction
- Structure type: At-Grade

Other information
- Station code: 2612

History
- Opened: 31 December 1892
- Electrified: 1993 (25 kV AC)

Services
Preceding station	TCDD Taşımacılık	Following station
Eskişehir towards Istanbul Halkalı	Ankara Express	Sincan towards Ankara
Beylikköprü towards İzmir (Basmane)	İzmir Blue Train	Sincan towards Ankara
Terminus	Ankara–Polatlı	Yenidoğan towards Ankara
Former services
Preceding station	Turkish State Railways	Following station
Eskişehir towards Istanbul	Capital Express	Sincan towards Ankara
Eskişehir towards Istanbul	Republic Express	Sincan towards Ankara
Eskişehir towards Istanbul	Fatih Express	Sincan towards Ankara
Eskişehir towards Istanbul	Anatolian Express	Sincan towards Ankara
Location

Polatlı Railway station (Turkish: Polatlı garı) is a railway station in Polatlı. Polatlı is on the İstanbul-Ankara Main Line, with intercity rail services to many cities around Turkey. The station was built opened in 1892 by the Anatolian Railway.

16 intercity trains running between İstanbul and Ankara service the station. 6 of the 16 trains run past Ankara towards eastern Turkey. 4 trains between İzmir and Ankara service the station along with a regional train to Ankara.

Yüksek Hızlı Tren high-speed rail trains between Eskişehir and Ankara service another station located a few kilometres east of this station.
