= Kırkikievler railway station =

Railway station in Kocaeli, Turkey

KIRKİKİEVLER

General information
- Location: Oramiral Salim Dervişoğlu Cd., Körfez Mah. 41040; İzmit, Kocaeli; Turkey
- Coordinates: 40.7620°N 29.9455°E
- Owner: Turkish State Railways
- Platforms: 2 (1 island platform, 1 side platform)
- Tracks: 4

Construction
- Structure type: At-grade
- Parking: Yes

History
- Opened: 1975
- Closed: 1 February 2012
- Electrified: 6 February 1977; 25 kV AC, 50 Hz
Former services
Preceding station	Turkish State Railways	Following station
İzmit towards Istanbul	Adapazarı Express	Köseköy towards Adapazarı
Location

Kırkikievler railway station (Turkish: Kırkikievler istasyonu) was a railway station in İzmit, Turkey. It was serviced by the Adapazarı Express regional train service from Istanbul to Adapazarı. Located just south of the city center, the station was originally built in 1975 by the Turkish State Railways, when the Istanbul-Ankara railway was realigned to bypass İzmit's city center.

Kırkikievler station was closed down on 1 February 2012 due to construction of the Ankara-Istanbul high-speed railway.
