= Darıca railway station =

Railway station in Darıca, Turkey

Darıca
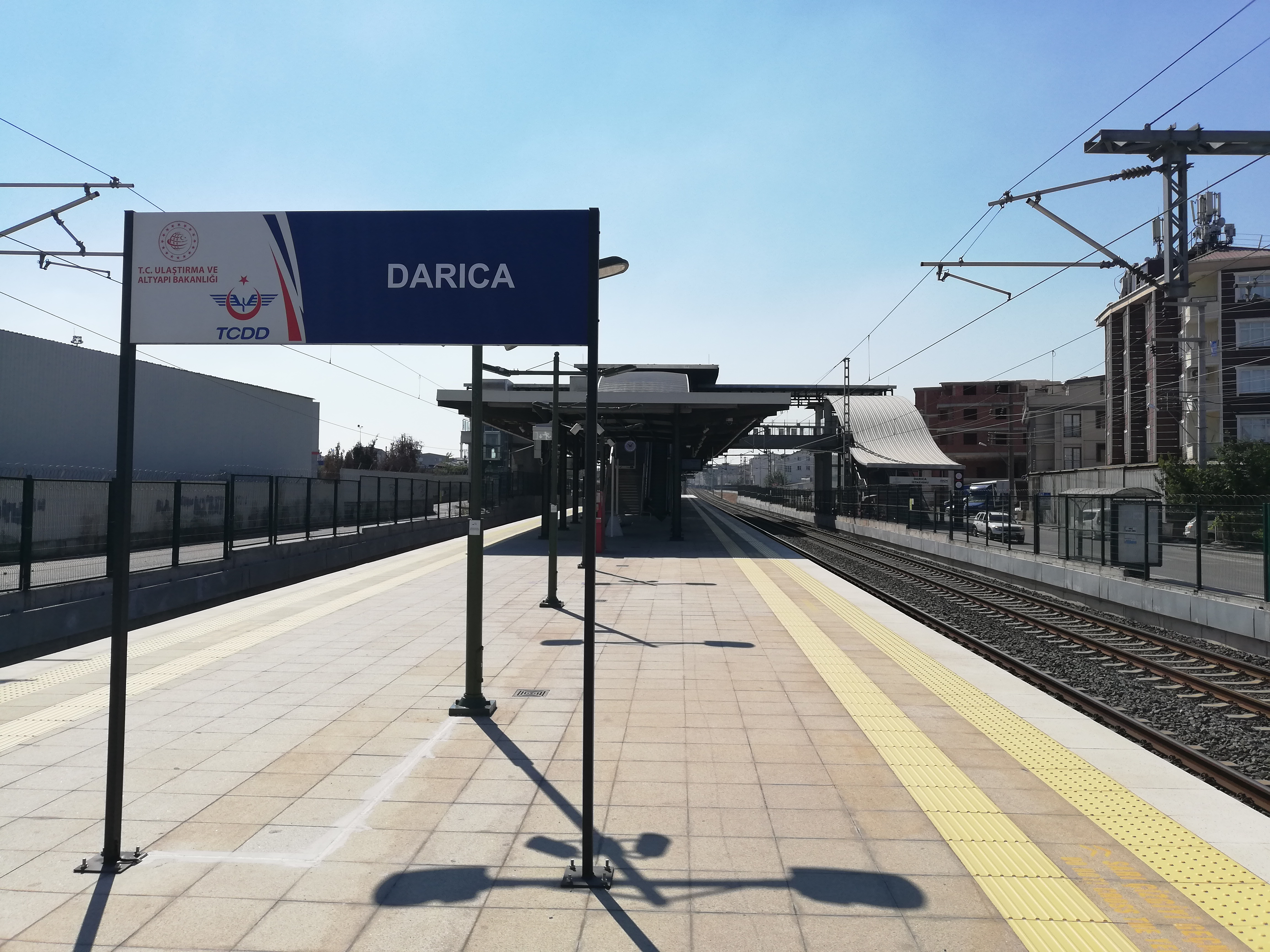
- A view to the east in Darıca Marmaray train station

General information
- Location: Çelikoğlu Cd., Sırasöğütler Mah. 41700; Darıca, Kocaeli; Turkey
- Coordinates: 40.7914°N 29.3918°E
- System: TCDD Taşımacılık commuter rail station
- Owner: Turkish State Railways
- Operator: Marmaray
- Line: Istanbul-Ankara railway
- Platforms: 1 island platform
- Tracks: 2

Construction
- Structure type: At-grade
- Accessible: Yes

History
- Opened: 13 March 2019

Services
Preceding station	TCDD Taşımacılık	Following station
Osmangazi towards Halkalı	Marmaray	Gebze Terminus
Track layout
Location

Darıca station (Turkish: Darıca istasyonu) is a station on the Marmaray commuter rail in Darıca, Turkey. It is a new station that has been added to the railway with the Marmaray project. Construction of the station started in 2013 and was structurally completed in 2014, along with the other eight stations located between Pendik and Gebze. Commuter rail service began on 13 March 2019.

The station has two tracks with an island platform and one express track on the south side for high-speed and intercity trains.
