= Polatlı YHT railway station =

Railway station serving the Ankara–Istanbul high-speed railway

Polatlı YHT

General information
- Location: Polatlı Yüksek Hızlı Tren Garı Yolu, 06900 Polatlı/Ankara, Turkey
- Coordinates: 39.580208°N 32.181111°E
- System: TCDD high-speed rail station
- Owner: TCDD
- Line: Yüksek Hızlı Tren
- Platforms: 2 side platforms
- Tracks: 4

Construction
- Structure type: At-Grade
- Parking: Yes
- Accessible: Yes
- Architectural style: Modernism

History
- Opened: 16 February 2011

Services
Preceding station	TCDD Taşımacılık	Following station
Eskişehir towards Istanbul Halkalı	Yüksek Hızlı Tren	Eryaman towards Ankara
Selçuklu YHT towards Karaman	Yüksek Hızlı Tren	Eryaman towards Ankara
Future service
Afyon towards İzmir (Alsancak)	Yüksek Hızlı Tren	Ankara Terminus
Location

Polatlı HSR station, short for Polatlı High Speed Rail station (Turkish: Polatlı YHT Garı short for Polatlı Yüksek Hızlı Tren Garı) is a railway station serving the Ankara–Istanbul high-speed railway just southeast of Polatlı. The station was opened on 16 February 2011, two years after the opening of the railway between Ankara and Eskişehir, and is the first railway station in Turkey to be dedicated to high-speed rail. Polatlı YHT is served by two tracks via side platforms with two express tracks in middle, as not all scheduled YHT trains stop at Polatlı.

Mainline trains operating along the Istanbul–Ankara railway do not serve the YHT station, operating into the more central Polatlı railway station. All mainline train service however has been suspended until 15 November 2018.

== Station Layout ==
G	Ground level	Exit/entrance, parking, buses
P Platform level
P Platform level	Platform 1, doors will open on the right
P Platform level	Track 3	← Yüksek Hızlı Tren toward Istanbul or Konya
P Platform level	Track 1	← Yüksek Hızlı Tren toward Istanbul or Konya, does not stop here
P Platform level	Track 2	Yüksek Hızlı Tren toward Ankara, does not stop here →
P Platform level	Track 4	Yüksek Hızlı Tren toward Ankara →
P Platform level	Platform 2, doors will open on the right
