= Boğaziçi Express =

Istanbul passenger train

Boğaziçi Ekspresi
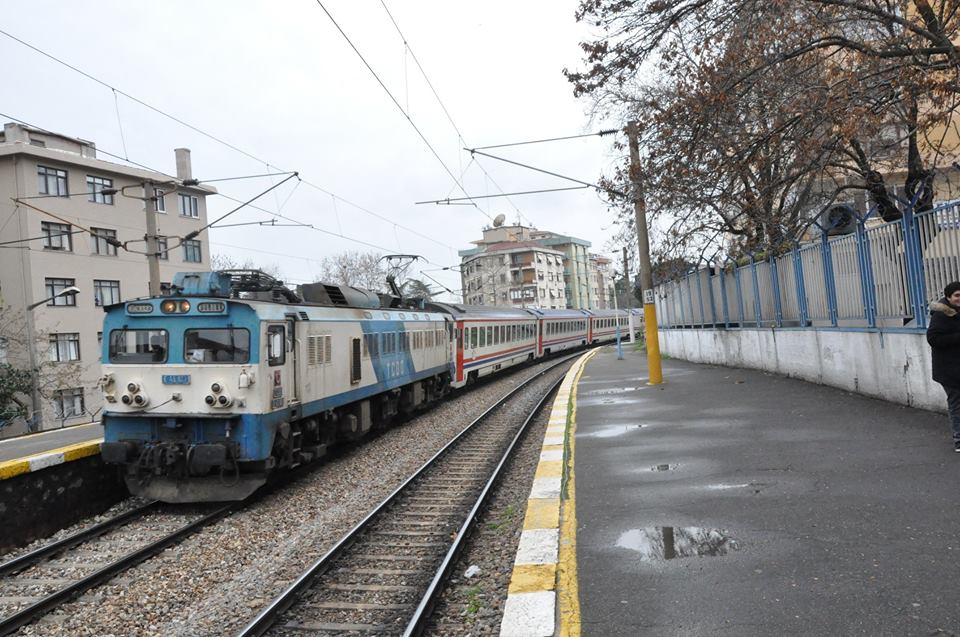
- The eastbound Boğaziçi Express passing Kartal station.

Overview
- Service type: Intercity rail
- Status: Active
- Locale: Northwest, central Anatolia
- First service: 1 June 1968; 8 December 2019
- Last service: 24 July 2014
- Current operator(s): TCDD Taşımacılık
- Former operator(s): Turkish State Railways

Route
- Termini: Arifiye, Sakarya; Ankara
- Stops: 35
- Distance travelled: 576 km (357.9 mi)
- Average journey time: 8 hours, 46 minutes
- Service frequency: Daily

On-board services
- Seating arrangements: 2+1
- Catering facilities: On-board dining car

Technical
- Rolling stock: TVS2000, Regional fleet
- Track gauge: 1,435 mm (4 ft 8 1/2 in) standard gauge
- Electrification: 25 kV 50 Hz AC
- Operating speed: 120 km/h (75 mph) maximum
- Track owner(s): Turkish State Railways

The Boğaziçi Express (Turkish: Boğaziçi Ekspresi) was a named passenger train operated between Istanbul and Ankara until 2012, when it was shortened between Arifiye and Ankara then later Arifiye to Eskişehir. The train was discontinued on 24 July 2014 and replaced by high-speed YHT trains.

Despite having Express in its name, the train served as many local stations between Arifiye and Ankara and was popular among students due to its low fare.

== History ==
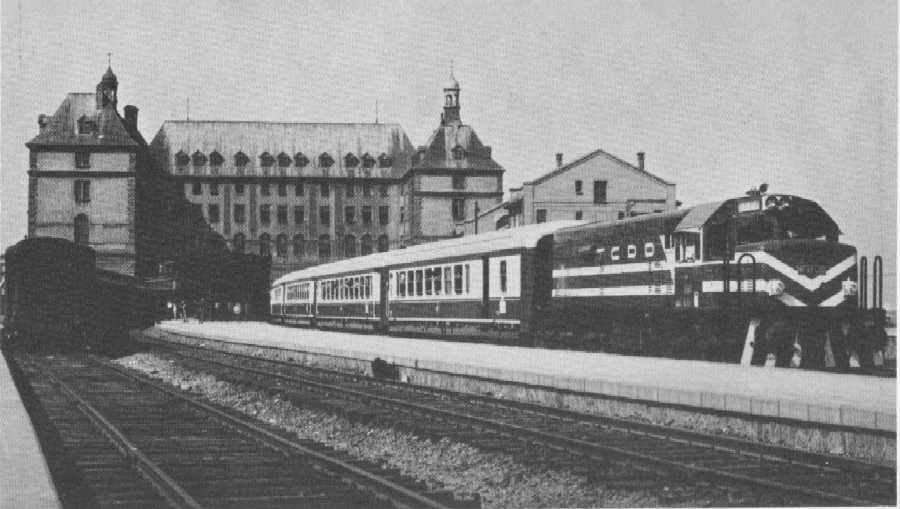
The Boğaziçi Express waiting to depart Haydarpaşa station in 1968, before electrification of the route.

The Boğaziçi Express made its inaugural run from Haydarpaşa Terminal in Istanbul to Ankara station in Ankara on 1 June 1968 with brand new railcars from CIWL as one of the State Railways' premier trains. The cost of a single ticket was 32 liras ($3.55 at the time), while a round-trip ticket cost 56 liras ($6.22). Motive power for the train was diesel for the entire route, even after 131 km (81 mi) of track from Istanbul to Arifiye was electrified in 1977. The train was the victim of several accidents during its lifetime, most notably on 4 January 1979 near Esenkent when the train collided with the Anatolian Express, killing 19 and injuring 124 people. When TCDD electrified the entire Istanbul-Ankara railway in December 1993, the Boğaziçi Express was given electric motive power. The first electrified train, pulled by E40002, departed Haydarpaşa at 08:00 on 26 December 1993. TCDD also equipped its new TVS2000 railcars, that had been built in order to improve the railway's image. The limited express service of the train changed a few years later and became one of the local intercity trains operating between Istanbul and Ankara, stopping at most stations. On 25 August 2004, TCDD discontinued the train citing low ridership, however after a public backlash occurred the train was revived and began operations on 27 September. Once the Ankara-Eskişehir high-speed railway was opened in March 2009, several trains operating between Istanbul and Ankara were cut back to Eskişehir. The Boğaziçi Express however, continued its full journey between the two cities until 1 February 2012, when it was shorted by 131 km (81 mi) from Istanbul to Arifiye, due to construction works between Gebze and Sapanca for high-speed train service. Two months later, on 2 April, the train was shortened again, this time from Ankara to Eskişehir, due construction for Ankara's Başkentray commuter rail service. The Boğaziçi Express ran between Arifiye and Eskişehir (282 km (175 mi)) for two more years until it was discontinued on 24 July 2014 with the opening of the Istanbul-Eskişehir extension of the Istanbul-Ankara high-speed railway.
