= Bozüyük YHT railway station =

BOZÜYÜK YHT

General information
- Location: Yediler Mh., Kovalca Cd., 11300 Bozüyük/Bilecik, Turkey
- Coordinates: 39.880234°N 30.043061°E
- System: TCDD high-speed rail station
- Owner: TCDD
- Line: Ankara–Istanbul high-speed railway
- Platforms: 2 (1 side platform, 1 island platform)
- Tracks: 5

Construction
- Structure type: At-Grade
- Parking: Yes
- Accessible: Yes
- Architectural style: Modernism

History
- Opened: 25 July 2014

Services
| Preceding station | TCDD Taşımacılık | Following station |
|---|---|---|
| Bilecik towards Istanbul Halkalı | Yüksek Hızlı Tren | Eskişehir towards Ankara |
| Bilecik towards Istanbul Halkalı | Yüksek Hızlı Tren | Eskişehir towards Karaman |
Location

Bozüyük HSR station, short for Bozüyük High Speed Rail station, (Turkish: Bozüyük YHT Garı short for Bozüyük Yüksek Hızlı Tren Garı) is a railway station on the Ankara–Istanbul high-speed railway just south of Bozüyük, Turkey. The station opened on 25 July 2014, along with the Eskişehir-Istanbul portion of the high-speed railway and is for the moment one of three railway stations in Turkey to be dedicated to high-speed rail. Bozüyük YHT has three tracks served by two platforms and two tracks in the middle for passing trains.

Prior to the opening of the high-speed railway, the now indefinitely closed Bozüyük station, located in the center of the town, was serviced by many trains running from Istanbul to Ankara and points beyond. This older railway station is expected to re-open to passenger traffic, once the construction of the Marmaray commuter rail system in Istanbul is finished and Intercity train services resume.

== Station Layout ==
| G | Ground level | Exit/entrance, parking, buses |
P Platform level
| P Platform level | Platform 1, doors will open on the right |
| P Platform level | Track 3 | ← Yüksek Hızlı Tren toward Istanbul |
| P Platform level | Track 1 | ← Yüksek Hızlı Tren toward Istanbul, does not stop here |
| P Platform level | Track 2 | Yüksek Hızlı Tren toward Ankara or Konya, does not stop here → |
| P Platform level | Track 4 | Yüksek Hızlı Tren toward Ankara or Konya → |
| P Platform level | Platform 2, doors will open on the left or right |
| P Platform level | Track 5 | Yüksek Hızlı Tren toward Ankara or Konya → |
