= Bilecik YHT railway station =

BİLECİK YHT
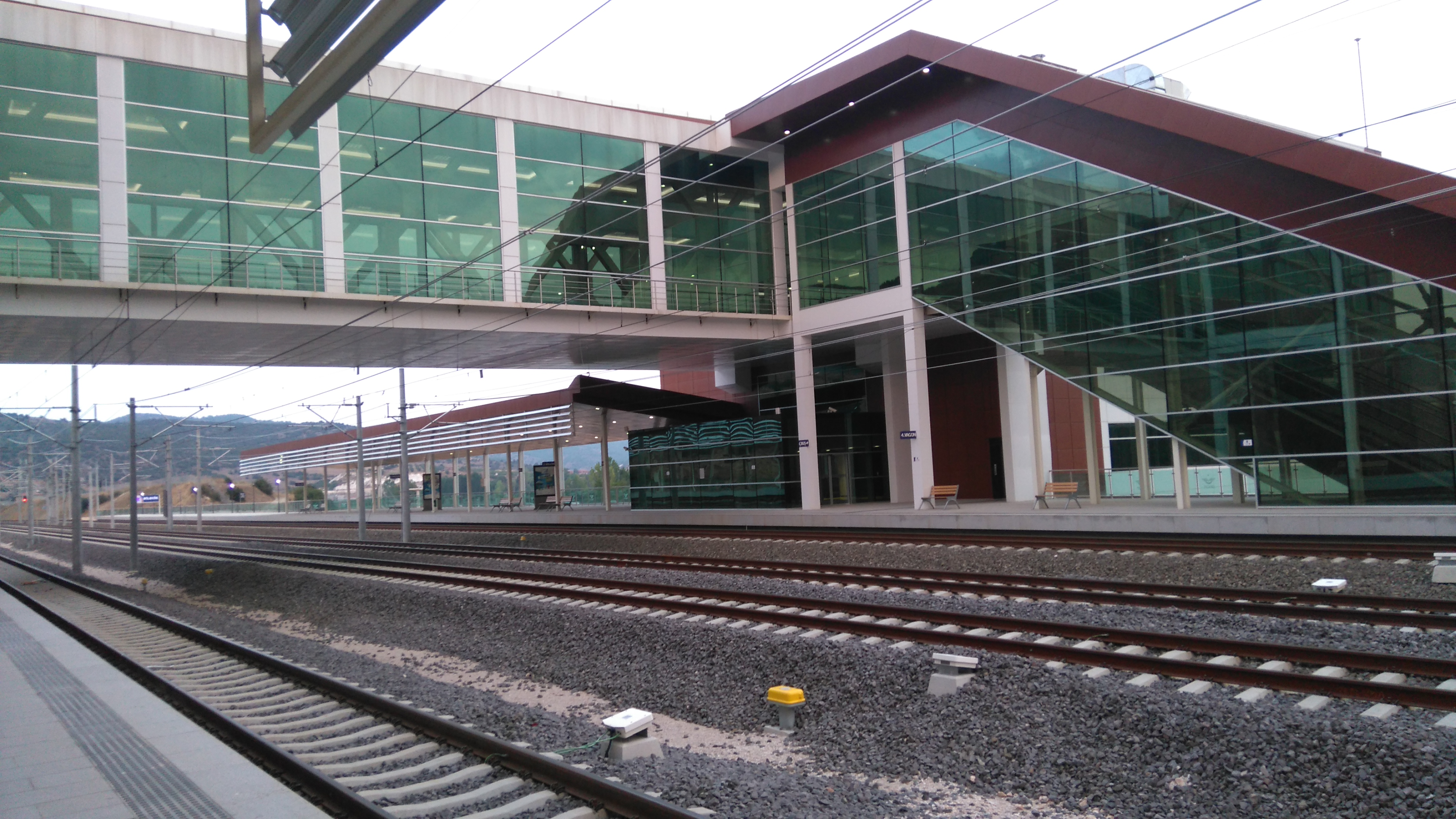

General information
- Location: Gar Sk., Osmangazi Mah. 11000; Bilecik; Turkey
- Coordinates: 40.135661°N 30.009629°E
- System: TCDD high-speed rail station
- Owner: Turkish State Railways
- Operator: TCDD Taşımacılık
- Line: Yüksek Hızlı Tren
- Platforms: 2 side platforms
- Tracks: 4

Construction
- Structure type: At-Grade
- Parking: Yes
- Accessible: Yes
- Architectural style: Modernism

History
- Opened: 1 June 2015

Services
Preceding station	TCDD Taşımacılık	Following station
Arifiye towards Istanbul Halkalı	Yüksek Hızlı Tren	Bozüyük towards Ankara
Arifiye towards Istanbul Halkalı	Yüksek Hızlı Tren	Bozüyük towards Karaman
Location

Bilecik HSR station, short for Bileck High Speed Rail station, (Turkish: Bilecik YHT garı short for Bilecik Yüksek Hızlı Tren garı) is a railway station on the Ankara–Istanbul high-speed railway just east of Bilecik, Turkey. The station opened on 1 June 2015, almost a year after the opening of the Eskişehir-Istanbul portion of the high-speed railway, and is for the moment one of three railway stations in Turkey dedicated to high-speed rail. Bilecik YHT has the same layout as the Polatlı YHT railway station; two tracks served by two side platforms and two passing tracks in the middle, as all scheduled YHT trains do not stop at Bilecik.

Prior to the opening of the high-speed railway, the now indefinitely closed Bilecik railway station, located south of the town and the YHT station, was serviced by many trains running from Istanbul to Ankara and points beyond. The railway station is expected to re-open to passenger traffic, once the construction of the Marmaray commuter rail system in Istanbul is finished and Intercity train services resume.

== Station Layout ==
G	Ground level	Exit/entrance, parking, buses
P Platform level
P Platform level	Platform 1, doors will open on the right
P Platform level	Track 3	← Yüksek Hızlı Tren toward Söğütlüçeşme or Halkalı
P Platform level	Track 1	← Yüksek Hızlı Tren toward Söğütlüçeşme or Halkalı, does not stop here
P Platform level	Track 2	Yüksek Hızlı Tren toward Ankara or Konya, does not stop here →
P Platform level	Track 4	Yüksek Hızlı Tren toward Ankara or Konya →
P Platform level	Platform 2, doors will open on the right
