= Anatolian Express =

Train service between Istanbul and Ankara

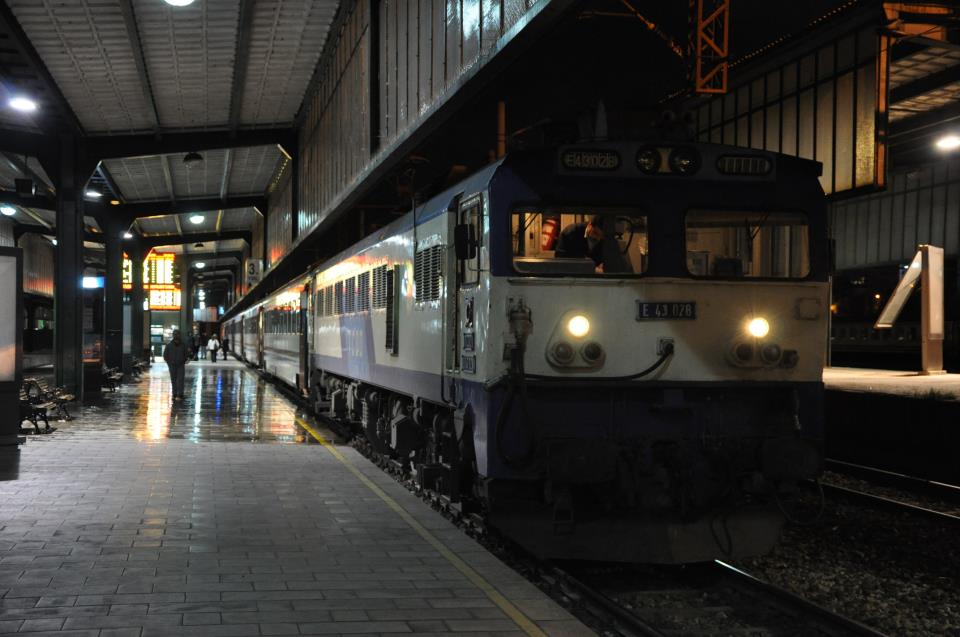
- The westbound Anatolian Express waiting to depart Ankara.

Overview
- Service type: Inter-city rail
- Status: Operating
- Locale: Northwest, Central Anatolia
- First service: 1927
- Current operator(s): Turkish State Railways
- Former operator(s): CIWL

Route
- Termini: Haydarpaşa Terminal, Istanbul; Ankara Central Station, Ankara
- Stops: 17
- Distance travelled: 576.6 km (358.3 mi)
- Service frequency: Daily each way
- Train number(s): 11208 (Eastbound); 11207 (Westbound)

On-board services
- Class(es): Sleeping Class
- Sleeping arrangements: Private room accommodations
- Catering facilities: Dining Car
- Baggage facilities: Checked baggage available at selected stations

Technical
- Rolling stock: TVS2000
- Track gauge: 1,435 mm (4 ft 8 1/2 in) standard gauge
- Electrification: 25 kV 50 Hz AC
- Operating speed: 120 km/h (75 mph) maximum
- Track owner(s): TCDD

The Anatolian Express (Turkish: Anadolu Ekspresi, French: Anatolie Express) was one of the four direct train services operating between Istanbul and Ankara. The train was an overnight train consisting of eight sleeping cars and one dining car. The train was the first non-international train to consist of a sleeping car in Turkey. The train was operated by the CIWL from 1927 to 1950. From 1950 on, TCDD operates the train.

== Timetable ==
The Anatolian Express runs every night from both termini.

Outward			Return		
#	Station	Time	#	Station	Time
1	Istanbul-Haydarpaşa	22:30	1	Ankara Central	22:30
2	Söğütlüçeşme	22:34	2	Sincan	23:03
3	Bostancı	22:44	3	Polatlı	23:55
4	Pendik	23:02	4	Eskişehir Central	02:09
5	İzmit Central	23:56	5	İnönü	02:36
6	Arifiye	00:29	6	Karaköy	03:04
7	Yayla D	02:12	7	Bilecik	03:28
8	Bozöyük	02:47	8	Arifiye	04:55
9	Eskişehir Central	03:36	9	İzmit Central	05:27
10	Polatlı	05:50	10	Pendik	06:31
11	Sincan	06:41	11	Bostancı	06:53
12	Ankara Central	07:07	12	Söğütlüçeşme	07:04
			13	Istanbul-Haydarpaşa	07:07
