= Pendik railway station =

Main railway station in Pendik, Istanbul, Turkey

Pendik
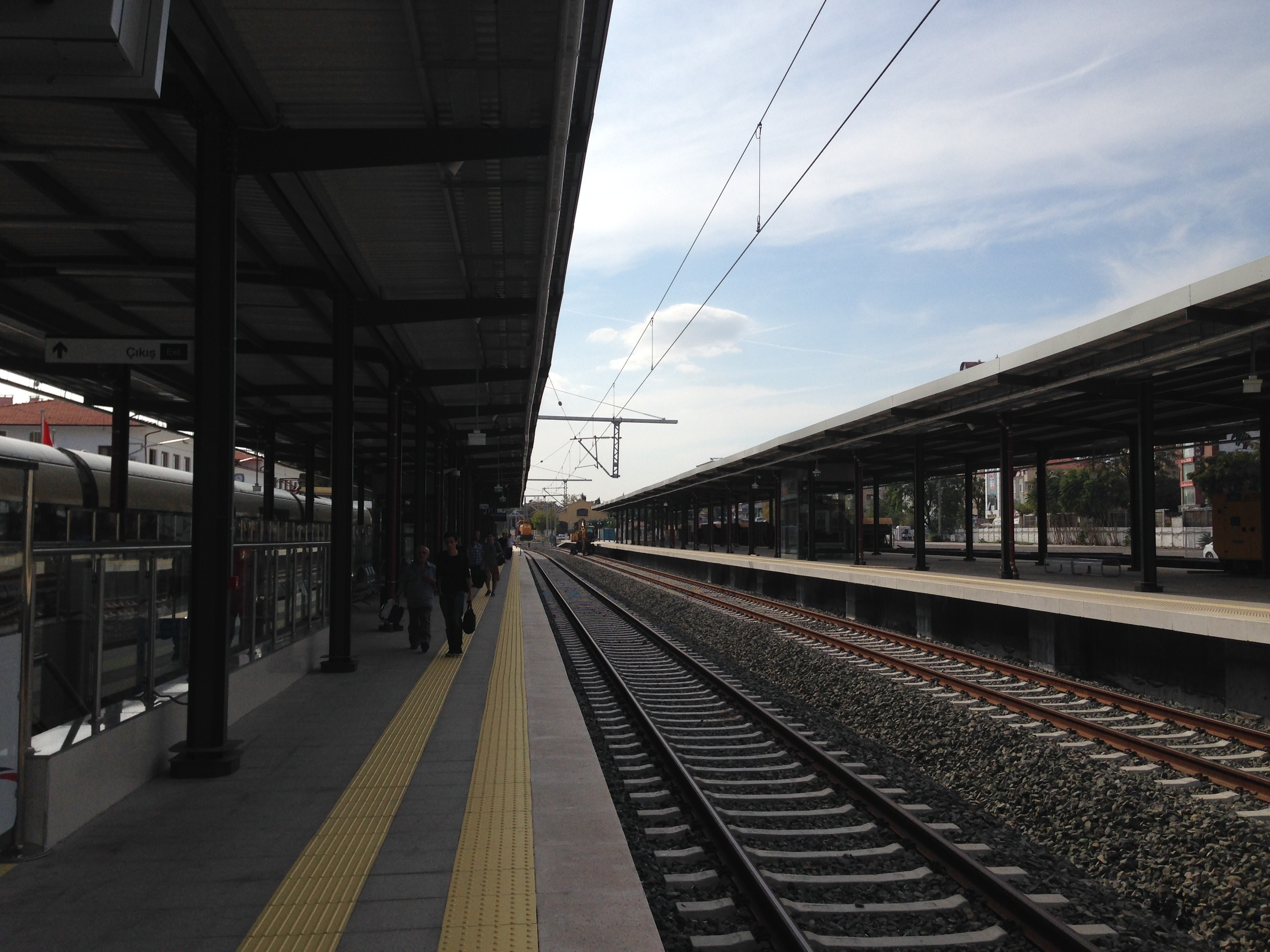
- The intercity platform (left) and the Marmaray platform. (right)

General information
- Location: Hatboyu Caddesi, Batı Mah. 34890; Pendik/Istanbul; Turkey
- Coordinates: 40.8801°N 29.231°E
- System: TCDD high-speed and regional rail station
- Owner: Turkish State Railways
- Operator: TCDD Taşımacılık
- Line: Istanbul-Ankara railway
- Platforms: 3 (2 island platforms, 1 side platform)
- Tracks: 4
- Connections: IETT Bus: 16C, 16A, 16D, 17, 17B, 132, 132A, 132B, 132D, 132E, 132F, 132H, 132K, 132P, 132V, 133, 133A, 133AK, 133GP, 133K, 133KT, 132T, 132Ü, 133Ş, 222, 251, KM2, KM10, KM13, KM24, KM26, KM27, KM28, KM72; Istanbul Minibüs: Kadıköy-Pendik

Construction
- Structure type: At-grade
- Parking: Yes
- Accessible: Yes

Other information
- Station code: 1609

History
- Opened: 1872
- Closed: 2012-14
- Rebuilt: 1936 (Station building); 2013-14 (Platforms)
- Electrified: 29 May 1969; 25 kV AC, 50 Hz

Services
Preceding station	TCDD Taşımacılık	Following station
Bostancı towards Istanbul Halkalı	Yüksek Hızlı Tren	Gebze towards Ankara
Bostancı towards Istanbul Halkalı	Yüksek Hızlı Tren	Gebze towards Karaman
Bostancı towards Istanbul Halkalı	Ankara Express	Gebze towards Ankara
Yunus towards Halkalı	Marmaray	Kaynarca towards Gebze
Former services
Preceding station	Turkish State Railways	Following station
Bostancı towards Istanbul	Capital Express	İzmit towards Ankara
Bostancı towards Istanbul	Republic Express	İzmit towards Ankara
Bostancı towards Istanbul	Fatih Express	İzmit towards Ankara
Bostancı towards Istanbul	Anatolian Express	İzmit towards Ankara
Bostancı towards Istanbul	Boğaziçi Express	Gebze towards Ankara
Bostancı towards Istanbul	Eskişehir Express	İzmit towards Eskişehir
Bostancı towards Istanbul	Sakarya Express	İzmit towards Eskişehir
Kartal towards Istanbul	Adapazarı Express	İçme towards Adapazarı
Yunus towards Haydarpaşa	Haydarpaşa suburban	Kaynarca towards Gebze
Location

Pendik station (Turkish: Pendik garı) is the main railway station in Pendik, Istanbul. Located between Hatboyu and Abdülhalik Renda Avenues in southeastern Pendik. TCDD Taşımacılık operates YHT trains to Ankara and Konya, via Eskişehir, along with daily regional trains to Adapazarı. The station is 24.05 km (14.94 mi) away from Haydarpaşa station in central Istanbul. The metro line M10 is currently under construction to make the link with Sabiha Gökçen Airport, which is located about 9 km in the North.

== History ==
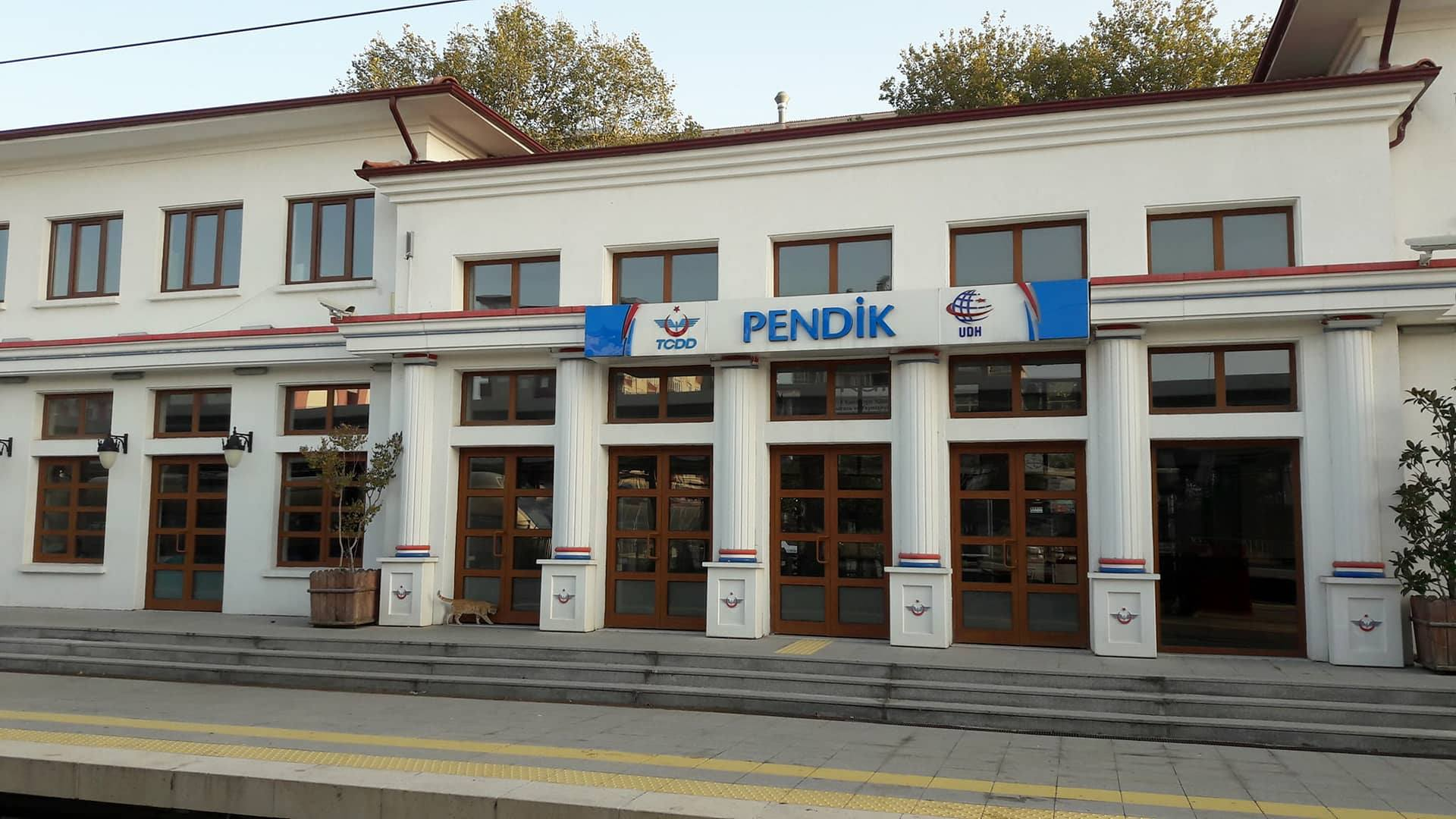
The 1936 station building after renovation.

Pendik station was originally opened in 1872 by the Ottoman government, as part of a railway from Constantinople (modern-day Istanbul) to İzmit. The railway was later taken over by the Ottoman Anatolian Railway (CFOA) in 1888 and extended to Konya and Ankara. In 1909, the railway began operating frequent train service from Haydarpaşa station to Pendik. The CFOA was nationalized in 1927 and in 1936, Pendik station was rebuilt and expanded by the Turkish State Railways. In 1969, the station was electrified and commuter rail service between Haydarpaşa and Gebze began servicing Pendik. The station was also a stop on all intercity trains running east from Istanbul. On 29 April 2012, all train service east of the station was suspended for the construction of the Istanbul-Ankara high-speed railway and the Marmaray commuter rail system. Commuter trains continued to operate from Haydarpaşa to Pendik until 19 February 2013 when all train service west of the station was suspended. Pendik station was rebuilt during its 17-month closure; the platforms were rebuilt and expanded to service four tracks, instead of three, and a new station mezzanine was constructed in the underpass. On 26 July 2014, Pendik station reopened, serving high-speed YHT trains to Ankara and Konya. Works on the rest of the Marmaray system was completed by March 12, 2019, when further intercity train service, along with commuter rail service, returned to Pendik station.

== Station Layout ==
Pendik station has two island platforms and one side platform. Platform 1, served by tracks 1 and 2, are reserved for future Maramaray commuter service. Platforms 2, serving tracks 3 and 4, are for TCDD high-speed and regional trains.

P Platform level	Track 1	← Marmaray toward Halkalı
P Platform level	Island platform, doors will open on the left
P Platform level	Track 2	Marmaray toward Gebze →
P Platform level	Track 3	←Yüksek Hızlı Tren toward Söğütlüçeşme or Halkalı; Ada Express toward Adapazarı →
P Platform level	Island platform, doors will open on the left or right
P Platform level	Track 4	Yüksek Hızlı Tren toward Ankara or Konya → Ada Express toward Adapazarı →
P Platform level	Side platform (Platform 3), platform not in service
G	Street level	Exit/entrance, station house, buses
