= Capital Express (Turkey) =

Intercity train in Turkey

Başkent Ekspresi Capital Express
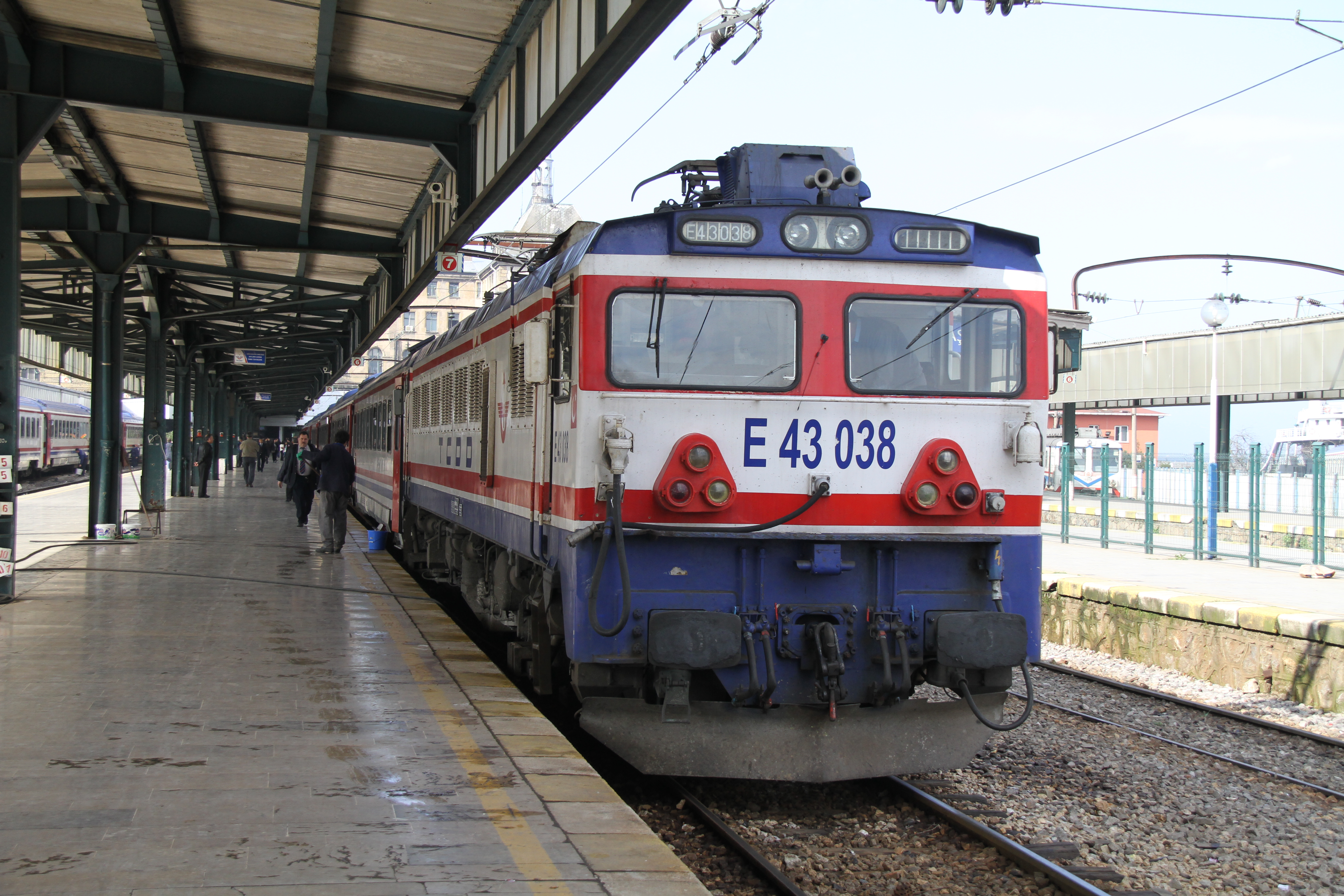
- The eastbound Capital Express waiting to depart Haydarpaşa station in Istanbul.

Overview
- Service type: Intercity rail
- Status: Discontinued
- Locale: Northwest, Central Anatolia
- First service: 1993
- Last service: 31 January 2012
- Current operator: Turkish State Railways

Route
- Termini: Haydarpaşa, Istanbul; Ankara (1992-2009); Eskişehir (2009-12)
- Distance travelled: 576 km (357.9 mi) (1992-2009); 313 km (194.5 mi) (2009-12)
- Average journey time: 2 hours, 27 minutes
- Service frequency: Daily

On-board services
- Seating arrangements: Airline-style coach seating
- Catering facilities: On-board café

Technical
- Rolling stock: TVS2000
- Track gauge: 1,435 mm (4 ft 8 1/2 in) standard gauge
- Electrification: 25 kV 50 Hz AC
- Operating speed: 150 km/h (93 mph) maximum
- Track owner: TCDD

The Capital Express (Turkish: Başkent Ekspresi) was one of the six daily intercity trains operating between Istanbul and Ankara on the Istanbul-Ankara railway before the Yüksek Hızlı Tren high-speed train service replaced all intercity trains on the line. The Capital Express was the fastest of the six trains, making limited stops only in large cities. The train would complete its journey in just over four hours and in the Eskişehir Province, trains would reach conventional speeds of 150 km/h (93 mph), which still hold the record for fastest conventional train service in Turkey. When the high-speed rail service was opened between Ankara and Eskişehir on 13 March 2009, the Capital Express, along with the other five intercity trains, were cut back between Istanbul and Eskişehir. During this period two more daily intercity trains were added, the Sakarya Express and Eskişehir Express, increasing daily intercity service to eight trains.

On 31 January 2012, the Capital Express was discontinued due to the rehabilitation of the railway between Istanbul and Arifye. When trackwork was completed in 2014, YHT high-speed service replaced the Capital Express all the way from Ankara to Istanbul.

== History ==
By the early 1990s, the Turkish State Railways' already bad reputation was worsening. Even TCDD's flagship train, the Fatih Express, running from Istanbul to Ankara, was losing market share to buses and airlines. New modern buses as well as the construction of the Istanbul-Ankara highway nearing completion, made passengers choose bus over train for the route. Even though the Fatih Express made limited stops; the blue-red Pullman fleet, which the train used, was greatly unpopular with the public. The cars lacked proper suspension and air-conditioning, which made journeys in the summer very uncomfortable, due to the generally arid and hot climate of central Anatolia. In the winter, radiators on the train would burn uncontrollably, sometimes even melting shoes rested upon them.

These problems forced the State Railways to introduce a new train service on the line. In 1992, the Capital Express was introduced with new TVS2000 railcars. These new railcars had new bogies with new suspension, which made journeys more comfortable. Along with better suspension, the railcars also had sound insulation, air-conditioning and automatic doors.

When the entire Istanbul-Ankara railway was electrified in 1993, the Capital Express was able to operate at greater speeds, most notably between İnönü and Eskişehir. The train became the State Railways' flagship service until 2009, when the Eskişehir-Ankara portion of the Istanbul-Ankara high-speed railway was opened and Yüksek Hızlı Tren high-speed passenger service became the pride of the TCDD. On 13 March 2009, the Capital Express was shortened by 263 km (163 mi) to Eskişehir and served as an extension of the YHT train service to Istanbul. On 31 January 2012, the Capital Express was discontinued due to the rehabilitation of the railway in Istanbul to accommodate new high-speed rail service.
