= Gebze railway station =

Railway station in Kocaeli, Turkey

Coordinates: 40°47′02″N 29°24′39″E

Gebze
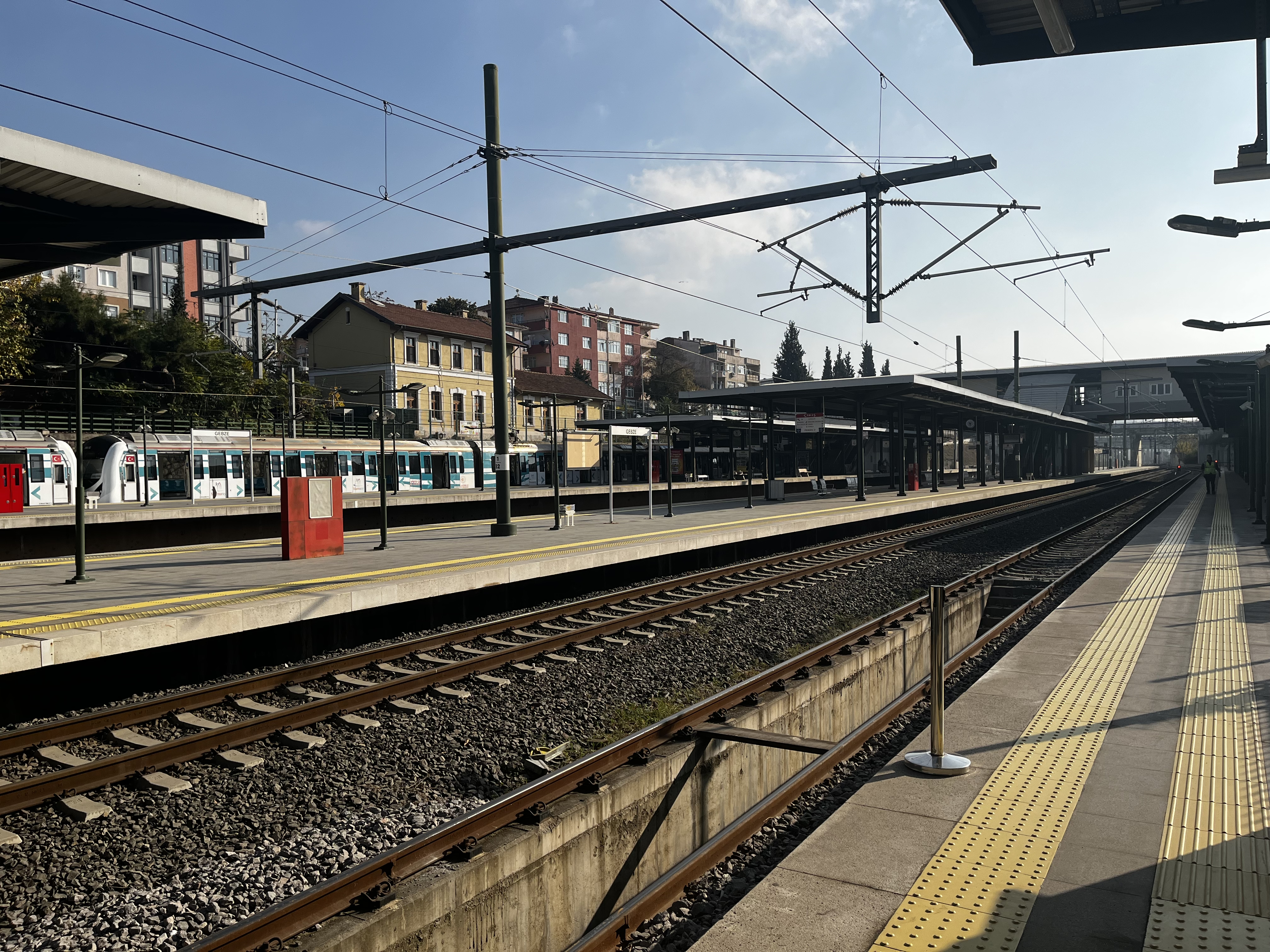
- Gebze railway station.

General information
- Location: Between Plevne and Etem Paşa Avenues; Gebze, Kocaeli
- System: TCDD Taşımacılık high-speed and regional rail station
- Owner: Turkish State Railways
- Line: Istanbul-Ankara railway
- Platforms: 2 island platforms, 1 side platform
- Tracks: 5

Construction
- Accessible: Yes

History
- Opened: 1 January 1873
- Rebuilt: 2013-14

Services
Preceding station	TCDD Taşımacılık	Following station
Pendik towards Istanbul Halkalı	Yüksek Hızlı Tren	İzmit towards Ankara
Pendik towards Istanbul Halkalı	Yüksek Hızlı Tren	İzmit towards Karaman
Pendik towards Istanbul Halkalı	Ankara Express	İzmit towards Ankara
Terminus	Ada Express	Hereke towards Adapazarı
Darıca towards Halkalı	Marmaray	Terminus
Former services
Preceding station	Turkish State Railways	Following station
Pendik towards Arifiye	Boğaziçi Express	Hereke towards Ankara
Tuzla towards Istanbul	Adapazarı Express	Diliskelesi towards Adapazarı
Osmangazi towards Haydarpaşa	Haydarpaşa suburban	Terminus
Location

Gebze station (Turkish: Gebze garı) is a station on the Istanbul-Ankara railway in Gebze, Turkey. It is located between Plevne and Etem Paşa Avenues just southwest of Gebze's city center. It was the eastern terminus of the Haydarpaşa suburban commuter service until 2013 and in 2019 became the eastern terminus of the new Marmaray commuter rail line.

Gebze was opened in 1873 as part of the Constantinople-Izmit railway, built by the Ottoman government. The Anatolian Railway (CFOA) took over the line in 1880 and continued to build further east from Izmit. The CFOA was nationalized in 1924 via the Anatolian-Baghdad Railway which was absorbed by the Turkish State Railways (TCDD) in 1927. On 29 May 1969 commuter service to and from Haydarpaşa Terminal was inaugurated and the line was electrified up to Gebze. Gebze became one of the most used stations in Turkey during this period as many commuters used the line to get to Istanbul. Commuter service was ended in June 2013 in order to rebuild the station for the new Marmaray commuter rail line as well as the new Istanbul-Ankara high-speed railway. The station reopened on 29 October 2014 with YHT High-speed service to Ankara and Konya via Izmit and Eskişehir from Pendik. Marmaray service to Halkalı entered service on March 12, 2019.

The 1969 station had two island platforms and four tracks. The rebuilt station has two island platforms and one side platforms with five tracks.
