= Istanbul–Ankara railway =

Major train link in Turkey

Istanbul–Ankara railway İstanbul–Ankara demiryolu
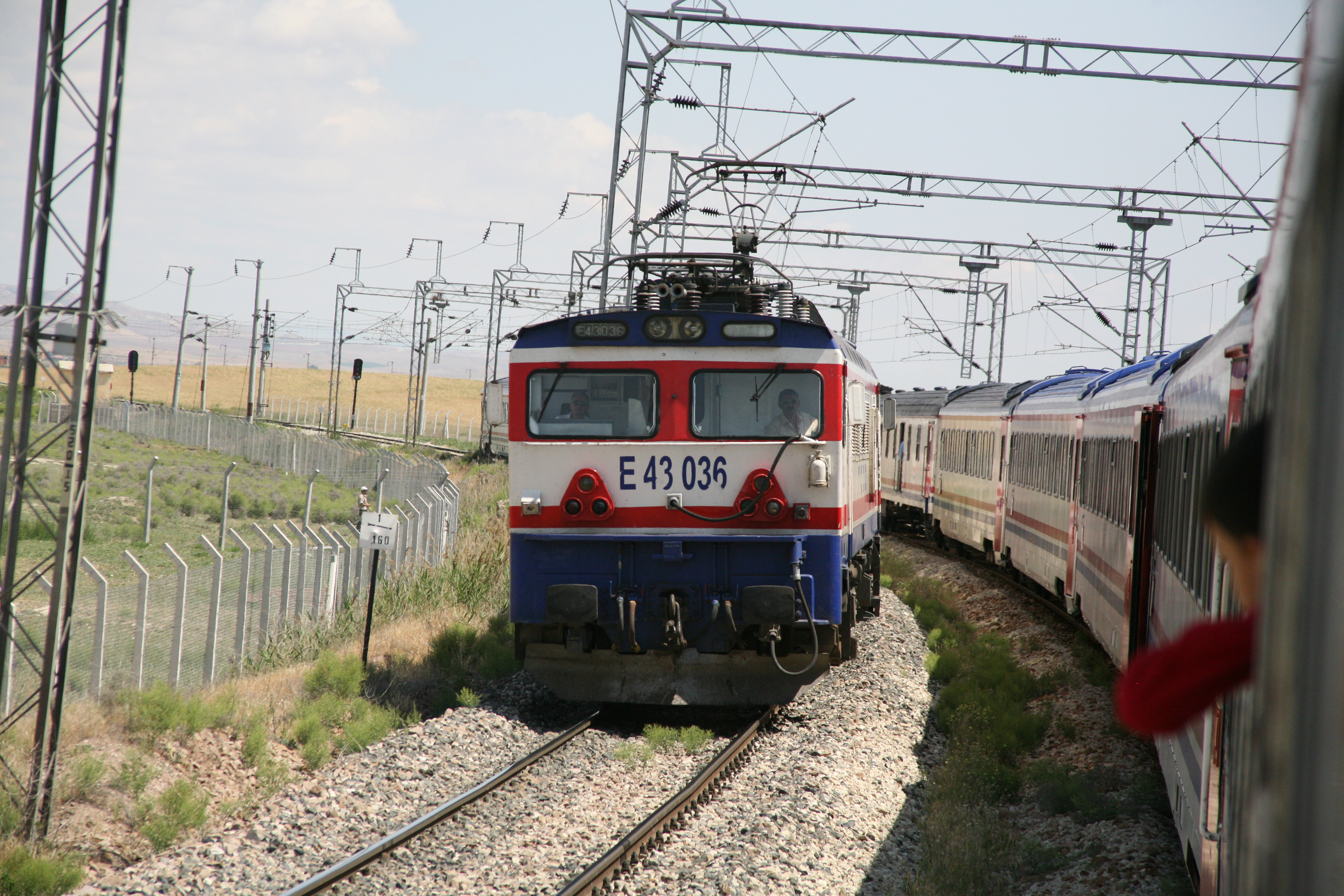
- Two trains passing each other, west of Ankara.

Overview
- Status: Operational
- Owner: Turkish State Railways
- Locale: Central Anatolia to Marmara region
- Termini: Haydarpaşa station, Istanbul; Ankara station, Ankara

Service
- Type: Heavy rail
- System: Turkish State Railways
- Operator(s): TCDD Taşımacılık; Körfez Ulaştırma (Körfez-Ankara)

History
- Opened: 22 September 1872 (first section); 31 December 1892 (final section)

Technical
- Line length: 576.6 km (358.3 mi)
- Number of tracks: 1-5
- Track gauge: 1,435 mm (4 ft 8 1/2 in) standard gauge
- Electrification: 25 kV 50 Hz AC OHLE
- Operating speed: 160 km (99 mi) Max speed
Route map
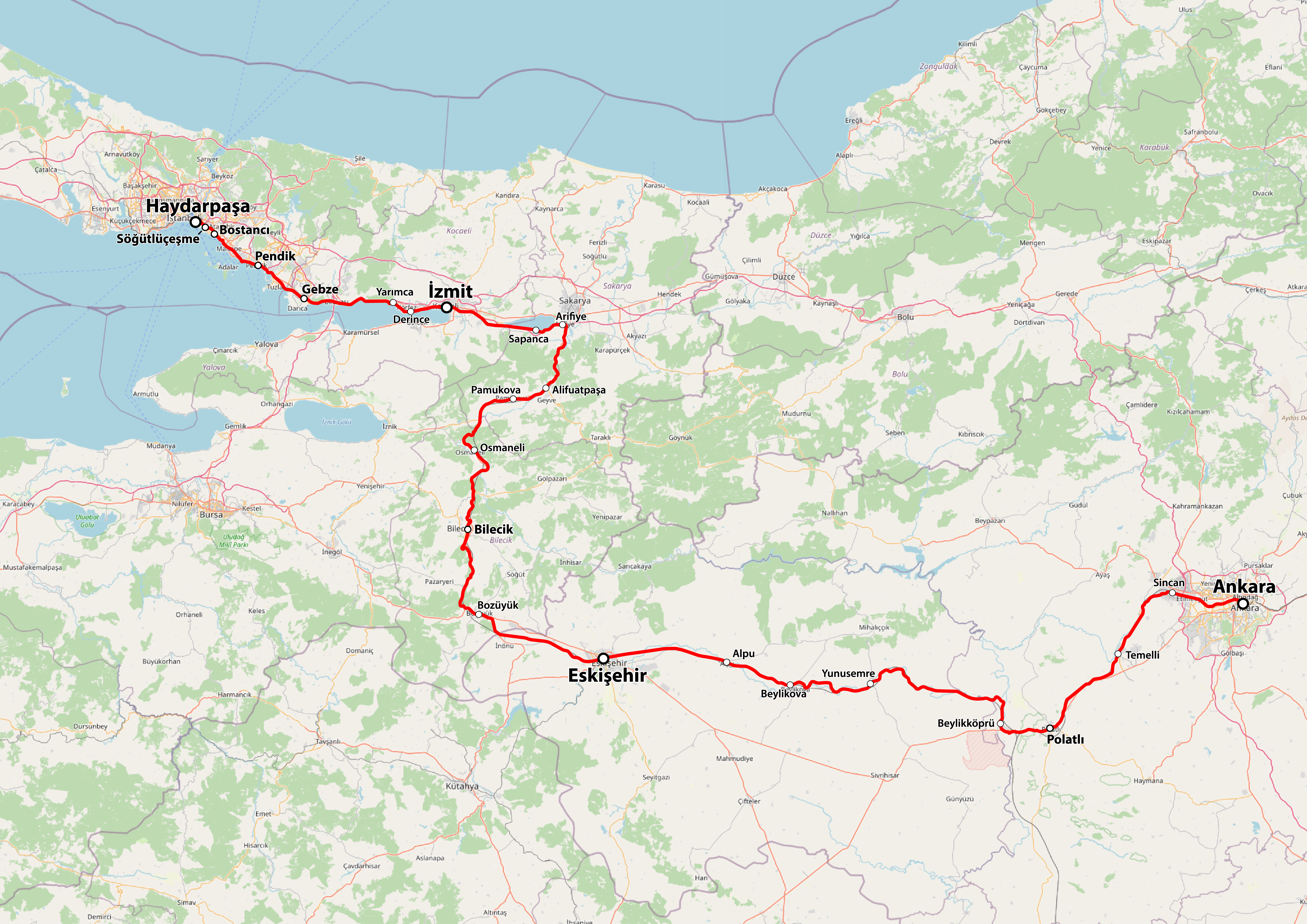
(Click to expand)

The Istanbul–Ankara railway (Turkish: İstanbul–Ankara demiryolu) is a 576.6 km (358.3 mi) long electrified railway in Turkey. The line connects Turkey's largest city, Istanbul, to the capital and second largest city, Ankara; making it one the busiest railways in the country in terms of passenger and freight rail traffic. Beginning at Haydarpaşa station in Istanbul and terminating at Ankara railway station in Ankara, the railway runs parallel to the Ankara-Istanbul high-speed railway and in several sections, hosts YHT high-speed trains.

Before the opening of the Ankara-Istanbul high-speed railway in 2009, the Istanbul–Ankara railway was the busiest line in Turkey as well as the primary inter-city route, connecting Istanbul with Ankara through five provincial capitals: Izmit, Arifiye (a suburb of Adapazarı), Bilecik, Bozüyük and Eskişehir. In 2008, 65% of all inter-city service used the railway entirely or at one point. The Haydarpaşa suburban and the Ankara suburban operated commuter service along the line in Istanbul and Ankara respectively. Freight rail traffic is heavy on the line as the railway connects to the Port of Haydarpaşa and the Port of Derince as well as other private ports and passes through several important industrial regions in Turkey. In 2015 the railway carried 6.1% of all freight rail traffic in Turkey.

Due to the construction of the Ankara-Istanbul high-speed railway, Marmaray and Başkentray, traffic on the railway declined greatly due to sections being closed down for several years. As of November 2016, the Haydarpaşa-Pendik section is still closed to all traffic as the rehabilitation of the line is still underway. No passenger service is operated between Arifiye and Sincan (not including YHT high-speed trains).

== Infrastructure ==
The line is mostly single track, although with significant multiple-track sections. Despite being mostly single track, the railway still has the longest multiple-track stretch in Turkey, excluding high-speed lines. Out of the total 576.6 km (358.3 mi) railway, 235.2 km (146.1 mi) are multiple track, with the remaining 341.4 km (212.1 mi) being single track. The multiple-track sections are three disconnected stretches and vary from double-track, triple-track and quadruple-track, with a short 7.2 km (4.5 mi) stretch in Ankara consisting of a 5-track mainline. The first multi-track stretch begins at Haydarpaşa station in Istanbul and continues 44.1 km (27.4 mi) as a triple-track main to Gebze. The north two tracks are mostly used for Marmaray commuter rail, while the south track is used for intercity/high-speed and freight rail. From Gebze, the line becomes a double-track railway and continues 123.5 km (76.7 mi) southeast to Pamukova. After Pamukova, the first single-track section begins as the terrain becomes mountainous. Once entering the Eskișehir Plain at İnönü, the second multi-track section begins. This part parallels the Istanbul-Ankara high-speed railway and permits speeds up to 140 km/h (87 mph). This section continues for 42.4 km (26.3 mi) until Hasanbey, an eastern suburb of Eskişehir. The second single-track stretch begins east of Hasanbey and continues for east 228.9 km (142.2 mi) until joining the Istanbul-Ankara high-speed line in Sincan. From Sincan, the railway becomes a quadruple-track line for 18 km (11 mi) until Marşandiz, where the last 7.2 km (4.5 mi) stretch of track is a 5-track railway.

The Istanbul-Ankara railway also hosts high-speed trains in certain sections, thus having the second-highest speed limit of conventional railways in Turkey, after the Konya-Karaman railway. Between Gebze and Sapanca, track speed is 160 km/h (99 mph).

== History ==
=== Ottoman Anatolian Railway ===
The first completed section of the railway was a 92.3 km (57.4 mi) section from Kadıköy in Istanbul to Izmit. This railway was built by the Ottoman Empire, financed by the Ottoman Bank and is the only railway that was built by the imperial government itself. The purpose of the railway was to connect the several towns along the northeastern coast of the Marmara Sea. Further plans to extend the railway into central Anatolia and as far as Mesopotamia were drawn up but since managing the line was financially difficult for the Ottoman Bank, the plans were scrapped and the operation of the line was sold to a British company in April 1880. The extension of the line to central Anatolia was revived under the new British investors, who formed an Anglo-American syndicate with Sir Vincent Caillard as the chairman, to finance construction. Caillard was unable to gather the necessary capital forcing the Ottoman government to transfer construction to another company. The concession was awarded to Georg von Siemens on 8 October 1888 and would be financed by the Deutsche Bank. In preparation for the undertaking, von Siemens formed the Ottoman Anatolian Railway (CFOA) on 4 October 1888 to build and operate the railway for 99 years.

The CFOA started construction further from Izmit in May 1889 and purchased the Istanbul-Izmit railway for 6 million CHF.

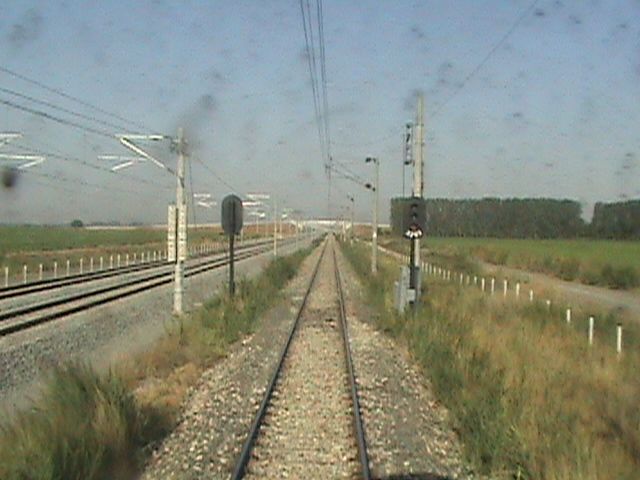
The line runs parallel with the high-speed line several times.

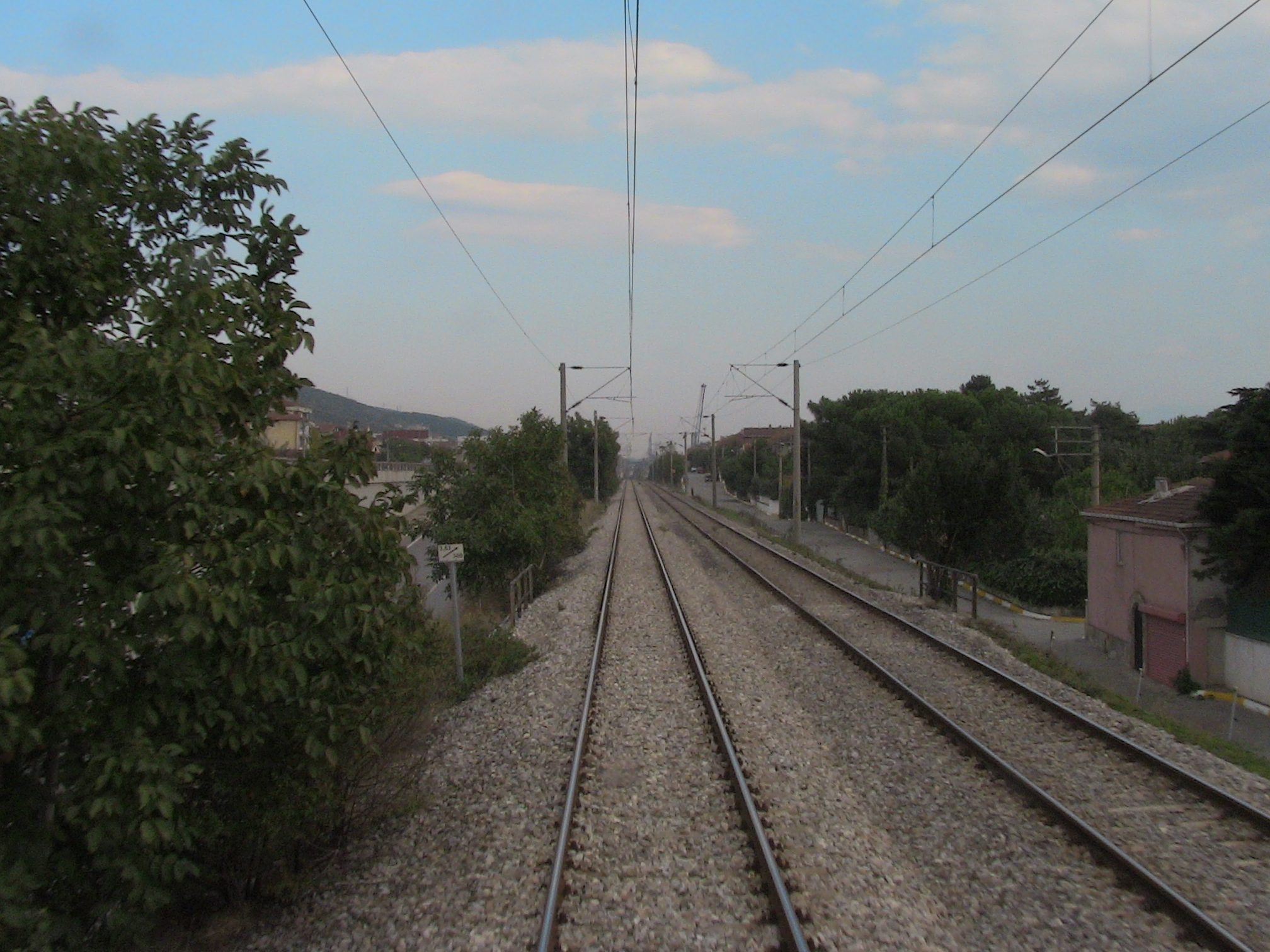
The line running near Körfez.

== Operations ==
Train type	Route	Frequency	Operator
Mainline	Halkalı – Söğütlüçeşme – Gebze – İzmit – Arifiye – Bilecik – Bozüyük – Eskişehir – Ankara	Daily	TCDD Taşımacılık
Mainline	Izmir – Menemen – Manisa – Balıkesir – Kütahya – Eskişehir – Ankara	Daily	TCDD Taşımacılık
High-speed	Halkalı – Söğütlüçeşme – Gebze – İzmit – Bilecik YHT –Bozüyük YHT – Eskişehir – Ankara	9x Daily	TCDD Taşımacılık
High-speed	Halkalı – Söğütlüçeşme – Gebze – İzmit – Bilecik – Bozüyük – Eskişehir – Konya	3x Daily	TCDD Taşımacılık
High-speed	Halkalı – Söğütlüçeşme – Gebze – İzmit – Bilecik – Bozüyük – Eskişehir – Konya – Karaman	Daily	TCDD Taşımacılık
High-speed	Eskişehir – Ankara	3x Daily	TCDD Taşımacılık
Regional	Gebze – İzmit – Arifiye – Adapazarı	5x Daily	TCDD Taşımacılık
Regional	Polatlı – Ankara	6x Daily	TCDD Taşımacılık
Commuter	Halkalı – Sirkeci – Söğütlüçeşme – Bostancı – Maltepe – Pendik – Gebze	7x Hourly	TCDD Taşımacılık
Commuter	Sincan – Eryaman – Ankara – Kayaş	5x Hourly	TCDD Taşımacılık
