= Haydarpaşa railway station =

Railway station in Istanbul, Turkey

HAYDARPAŞA
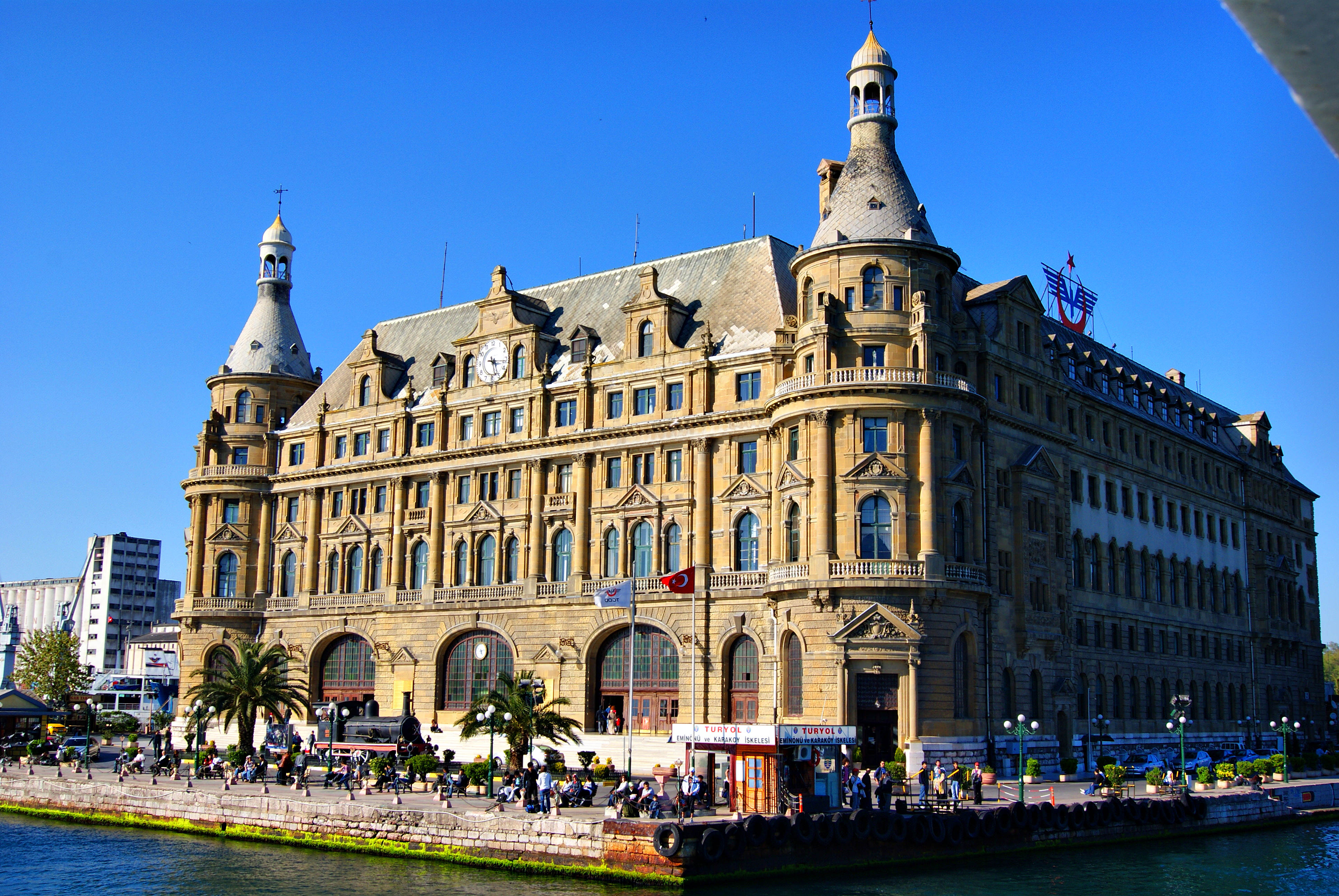
- Front facade of the station building.

General information
- Location: Haydarpaşa Gar Sk., Rasimpaşa Mah., 34716; Kadıköy, Istanbul; Turkey
- Coordinates: 40.9962°N 29.0187°E
- Owner: Turkish State Railways
- Line: Istanbul-Ankara railway
- Platforms: 6 Bay platforms
- Tracks: 9
- Connections: Kadıköy (Istanbul Metro); M4 (Istanbul Metro); Marmaray; Metrobus (Istanbul): Lines 34AS and 34G; Bus: Lines 13, 14A, 14D, 14M, 14Y, 15BK, 19EK, 19F, and 20E; Dolmus and Minibus: The KADIKÖY - FIKIRTEPE - GÖZCÜBABA - SAHRAYICEDID

Construction
- Structure type: At-grade
- Parking: For employees only
- Architect: Otto Ritter, Helmuth Conu
- Architectural style: German Neoclassical

Other information
- Status: Under renovation

History
- Opened: 22 September 1872
- Closed: 19 June 2013
- Rebuilt: 1908
- Electrified: 29 May 1969; 25 kV AC, 60 Hz
Former inter-city services
Preceding station	Turkish State Railways	Following station
Terminus	Trans-Asia Express Service suspended	Bostancı towards Tatvan Pier
Terminus	Capital Express	Söğütlüçeşme towards Ankara
Terminus	Republic Express	Söğütlüçeşme towards Ankara
Terminus	Fatih Express	Söğütlüçeşme towards Ankara
Terminus	Ankara Express	Söğütlüçeşme towards Ankara
Terminus	Bosphorus Express	Söğütlüçeşme towards Istanbul
Terminus	Anatolian Express	Söğütlüçeşme towards Ankara
Terminus	Eskişehir Express	Söğütlüçeşme towards Eskişehir
Terminus	Sakarya Express	Söğütlüçeşme towards Eskişehir
Terminus	Eastern Express	Söğütlüçeşme towards Kars
Terminus	Lake Van Express	Söğütlüçeşme towards Tatvan
Terminus	Southern Express	Söğütlüçeşme towards Kurtalan
Terminus	Meram Express	Söğütlüçeşme towards Adana
Terminus	Central Anatolia Blue Train pre-2012	Söğütlüçeşme towards Adana
Terminus	Adapazarı Express	Söğütlüçeşme towards Adapazarı

Former commuter rail services
Preceding station	Turkish State Railways	Following station
Terminus	Haydarpaşa suburban	Söğütlüçeşme towards Gebze
Location

Haydarpaşa station (Turkish: Haydarpaşa Garı) is a railway station in Istanbul, that was, until 2012 the main city terminal for trains travelling to and from the Anatolian side of Turkey. It used to be Turkey's busiest railway station. (Its counterpart on the European side of the city was Sirkeci station which served train services to and from the Thracian side of the country.) The station building still houses the headquarters for District 1 of the State Railways but since a fire in 2010 the station has not been in use and its future remains uncertain.

Haydarpaşa stands on an embankment over the Bosphorus just south of the Port of Haydarpaşa (one of the main container terminals in Turkey) and is slightly north of busy Kadıköy. Until the rail service was suspended, ferry services connected it to Eminönü, Karaköy and Kadıköy.

The closure of the station has been very controversial and a group known as the Haydarpaşa Solidarity Group (Turkish: Haydarpaşa Dayanışması) has staged regular protest sit-ins in front of it amid fears that the station and port would be sold; a plan involving seven skyscrapers provoked especially strong adverse reaction. In December 2015, the reintegration of Haydarpaşa station into the Marmaray network was theoretically approved along with the restoration and rehabilitation of the station building and platforms. As of 2025, it is planned to be used as both a terminal station and museum.

== History ==
=== Ottoman era (1872–1922) ===
In 1871 Sultan Abdülaziz ordered the first railway line to be built from Haydarpaşa in Istanbul to İzmit. Haydarpaşa station opened in 1872, by which time the railway extended as far as Gebze. In 1888 the Anatolian Railway (Chemins de fer Ottomans d'Anatolie, CFOA) took over the line and the station. Since the station was built right beside the Bosphorus, freight trains could unload at Haydarpaşa and the freight could be transferred straight to ships. Haydarpaşa station saw its first regular passenger service - daily train from Haydarpaşa to İzmit - in 1890. In 1892 the CFOA laid a line to Ankara and shortly afterwards a daily train started to run between the two cities.

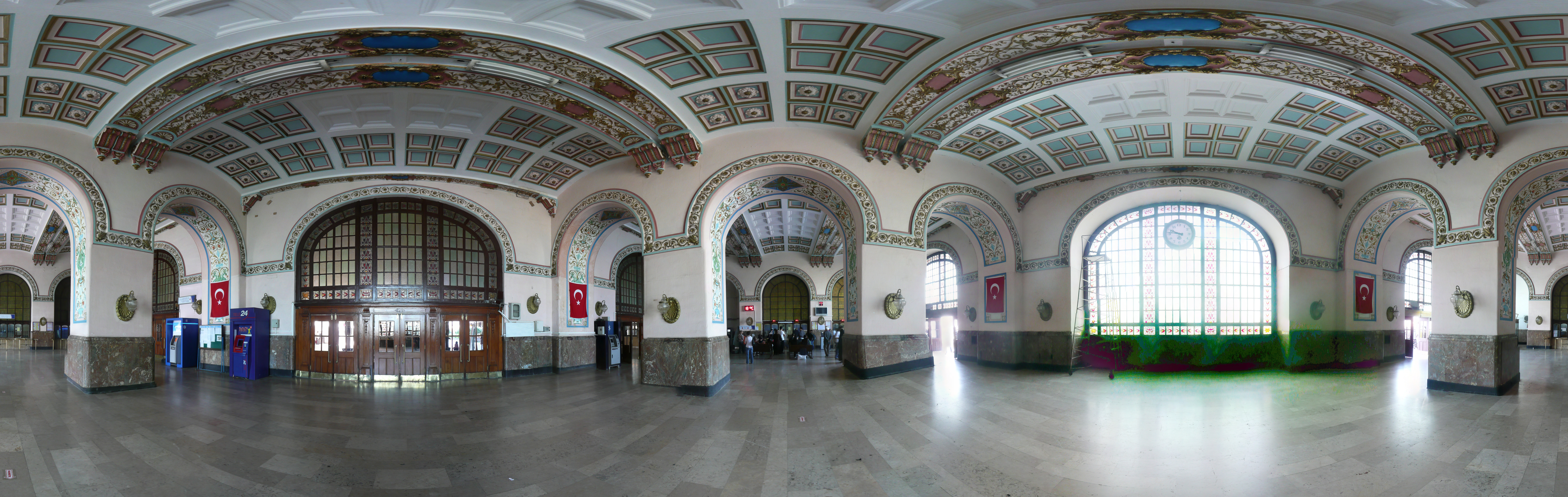
Interior hall in Haydarpaşa Terminal

Haydarpaşa was chosen as the northern terminus for the Baghdad Railway and the Hejaz Railway in 1904, and, with rail traffic increasing, a larger building was required. The Anatolian Railway hired two German architects, Otto Ritter and Helmut Conu, to build the new building. They chose a Neo-classical design and construction started in 1906. Its foundation is based on 1100 wooden piles, each 21 metres (69 ft) long, driven into the soft shore by a steam hammer. German and Italian stonemasons crafted the decoration of the exterior. The work was completed on land reclaimed from the sea on 19 August 1909 and the new terminal was inaugurated on 4 November 1909 for the birthday of Mehmed V. While the work was in progress the community of German engineers and craftsmen established a small German neighbourhood with its own school in the Yeldeğirmeni quarter of Kadıköy.

World War I broke out in 1914 and the Ottoman Empire sided with the Central Powers against the Allied Powers. When the Ottomans lost İstanbul was taken over by the British Empire and Haydarpaşa fell under British military control during the occupation.

In 1917 the architect Vedat Tek designed the pretty terminal decorated with Kütahya tiles where ferries used to deposit would-be train passengers in front of the station.

=== Republican era (1923–present) ===
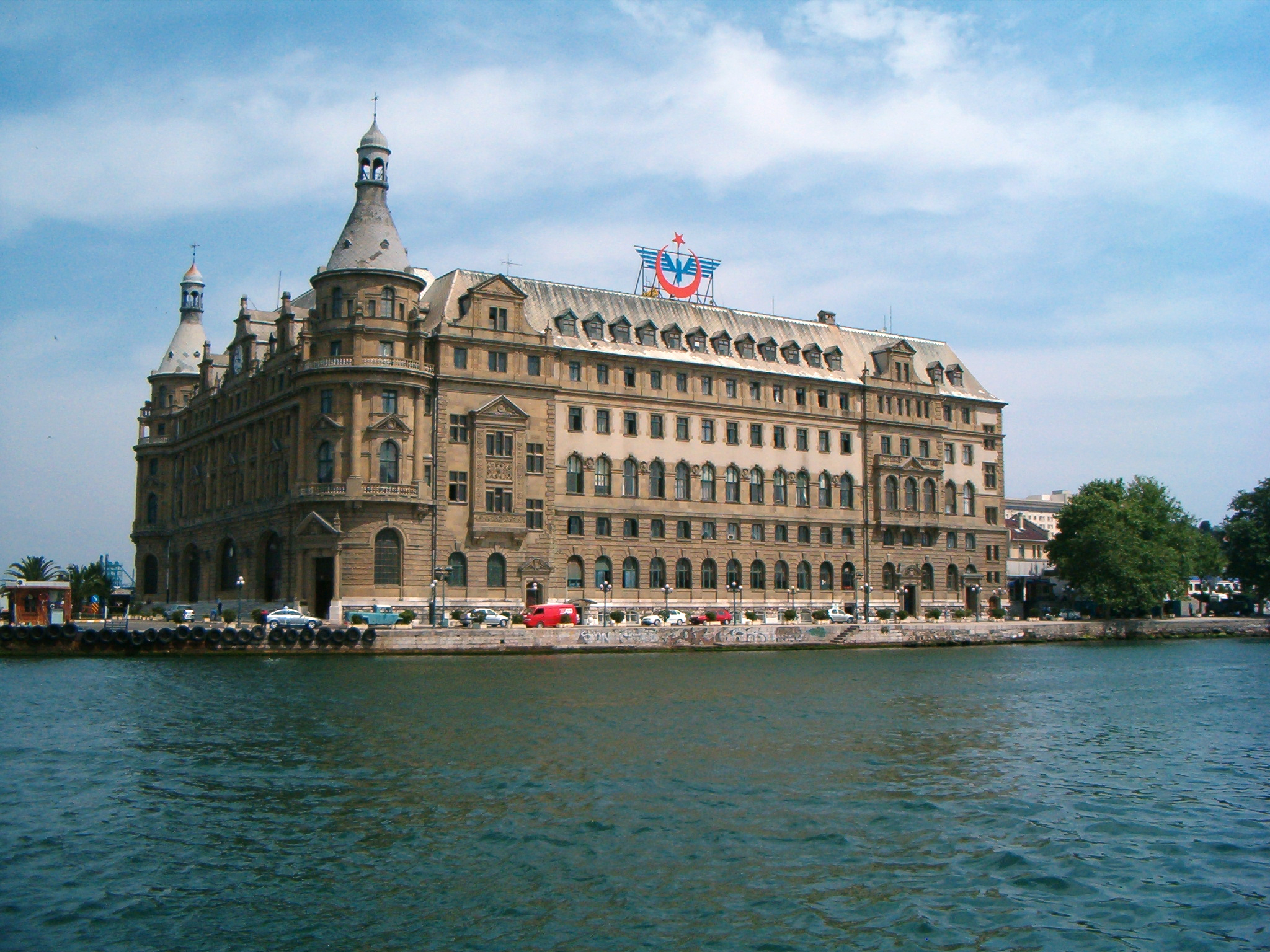
Haydarpasa terminal in 2007

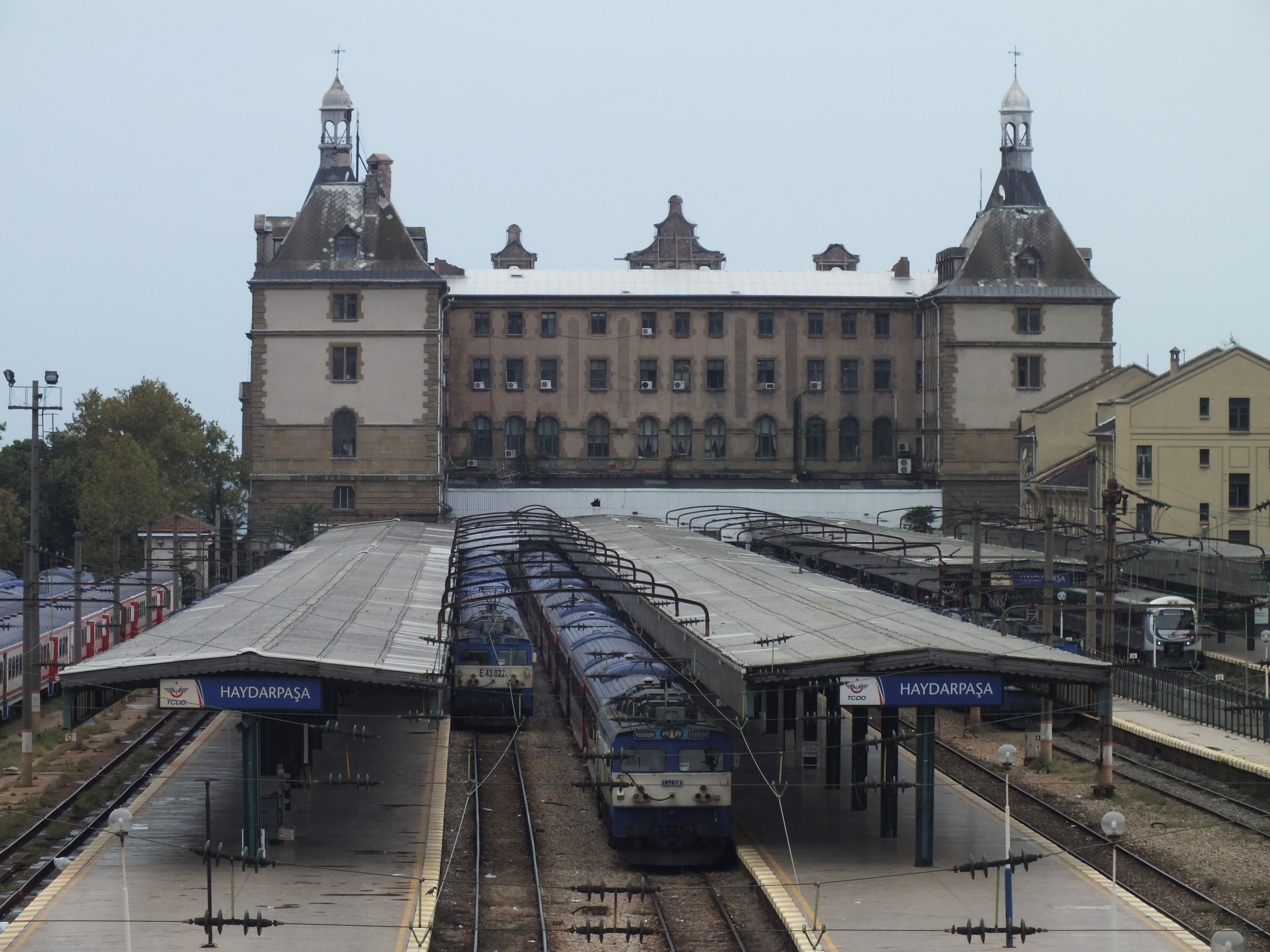
Intercity trains at Haydarpasa station in 2012.

The Turkish Independence War ended on 29 October 1923 with the British withdrawal from Istanbul and the formation of the Republic of Turkey. Haydarpaşa terminal was still under CFOA control but in 1927 the newly formed Turkish State Railways (TCDD) took over the CFOA and the terminal as part of the process of nationalising all the Turkish railways. In 1927 the CIWL started a premier train service, the all-sleeper Anatolian Express, that travelled daily between Haydarpaşa and Ankara. In 1938 the Eastern Express started running from Haydarpaşa to the eastern Turkish city of Kars, a distance of 1,994 km (1,239 mi). The famous Taurus Express from Haydarpaşa to Baghdad, a distance of 2,566 km (1,594 mi), entered service in 1940. In 1965 the Trans-Asia Express began running from Haydarpaşa to Tehran, a distance of 3,059 km (1,901 mi). In 1969 the tracks from Haydarpaşa to Gebze were electrified with 25 kV AC catenary for the Haydarpaşa-Gebze commuter line.

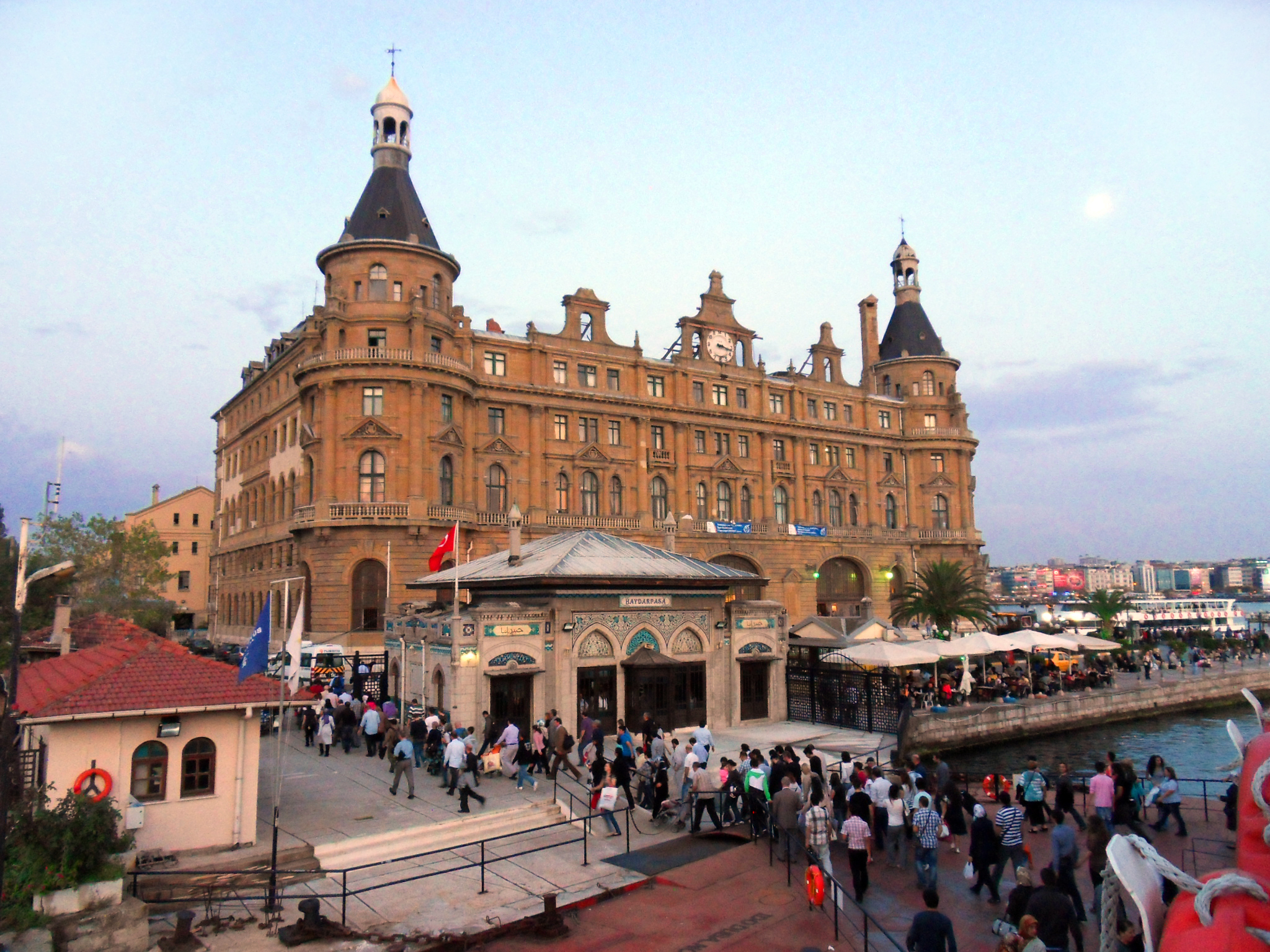
Haydarpaşa terminal after the fire that destroyed its roof in 2010

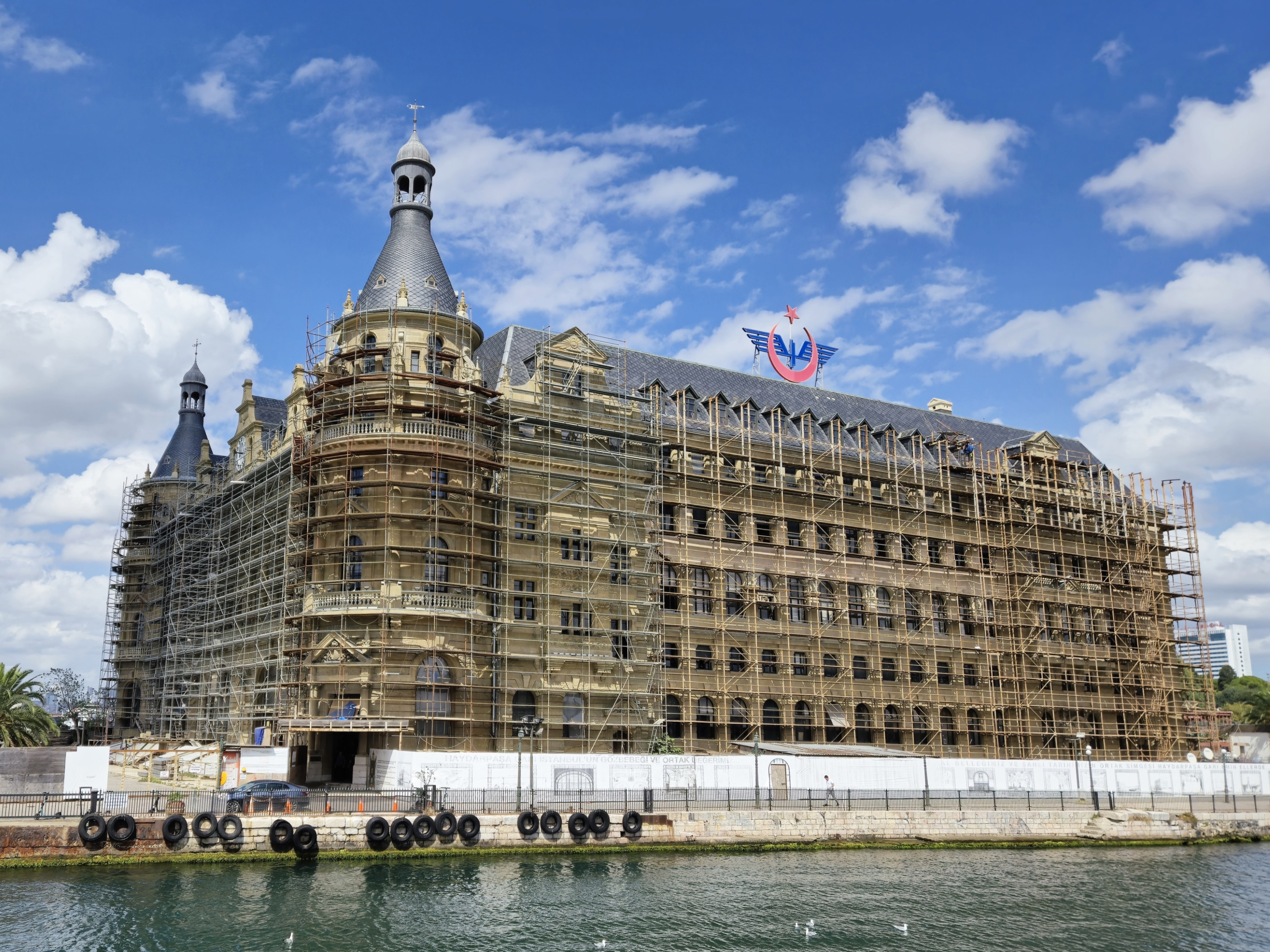
Haydarpaşa terminal undergoing restoration works in 2024.

In 1979 a tanker burning on the Bosphorus damaged the terminal building, but it was restored a few months later. On 28 November 2010 a fire caused by carelessness during restoration work destroyed the station's roof and the 4th floor. Three people were sentenced to ten months in prison for "recklessly causing the fire".

In 2011 the World Monuments Fund, the New York-based heritage preservation organisation, placed the railway terminal on its 2012 Watch, drawing attention to its uncertain future. In November 2012 the station hosted a three-day art exhibition entitled Haydarpasa: Past, Present and Uncertain Future, which was organised in collaboration with the WMF, and featured Canadian and Turkish artists and photographers seeking to raise international interest in preserving the station as a transportation hub.

On 2 February 2012 Haydarpaşa Station closed to long-distance trains to allow for the construction of the Istanbul–Ankara high-speed railway and the Marmaray which now connects Istanbul's Asian and European sides, halting train services between Istanbul and the Anatolian region of Turkey). Although work on the Marmaray has now been completed along with high-speed train services to Ankara, Konya and Eskişehir, these now leave from stations other than Haydarpaşa which remained closed and under restoration in 2022.

=== Archaeological excavations ===
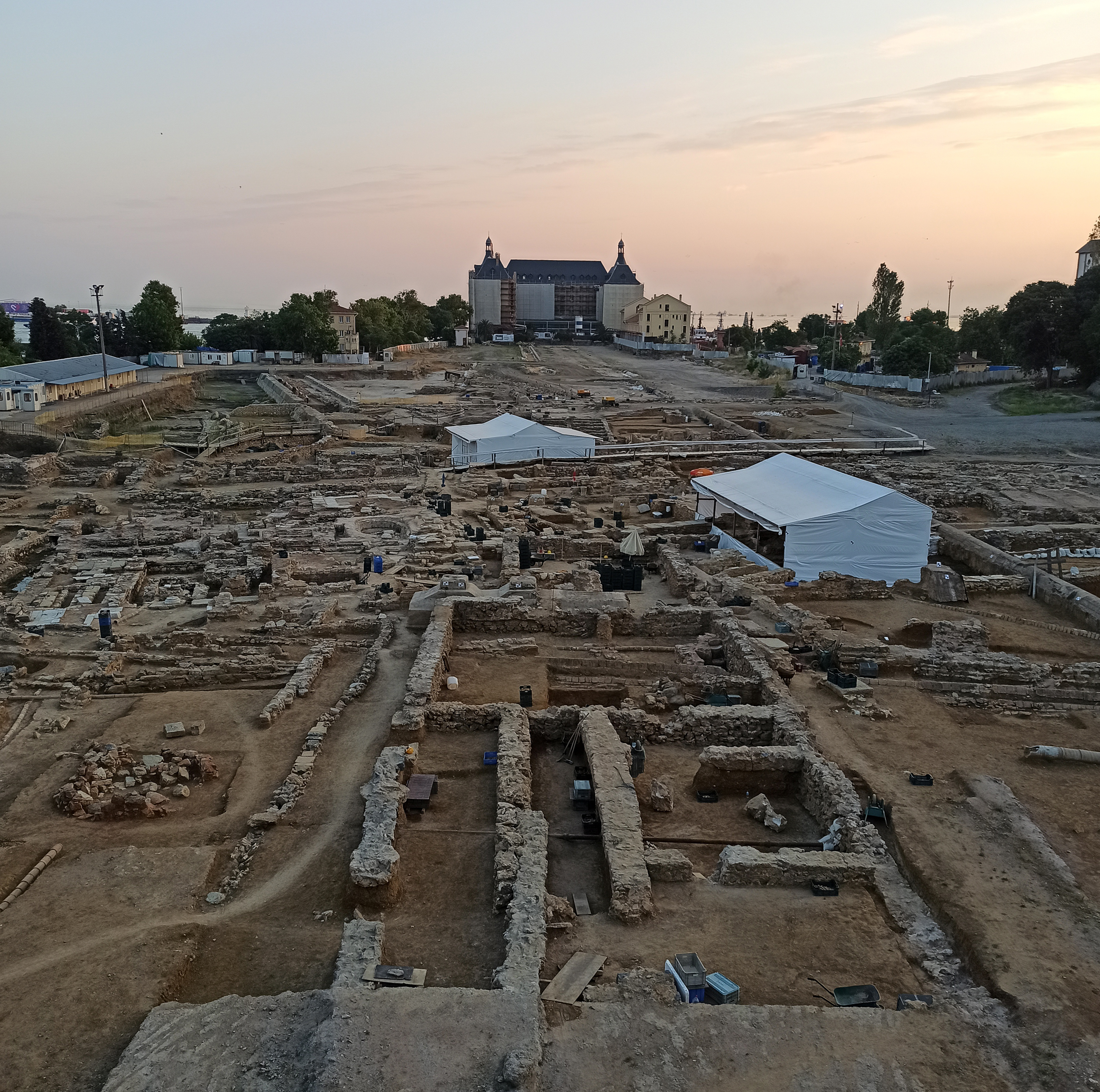
Haydarpaşa train station excavations in 2022

In 2018, remains of a Byzantine coastal town were uncovered during restoration work on the station. The excavations also unearthed a Byzantine-era fountain, a large fortification wall and a ceramic brick kiln. Dozens of graves were also discovered; in October 2018, archaeologists found an intact skeleton wearing a scented necklace. Jewellery and coins dating back to between 610-641 and 527-565 AD were also found.

A podium made of sheared rectangular blocks found between the railway platforms is believed to date back to the Hellenistic era.

== Restoration ==
Following the devastating fire in November 2010 that destroyed the station’s timber roof, towers and upper floor, a comprehensive restoration project was initiated.

One of the most important symbols of the Haydarpaşa Train Station Building is the towers located in the northwest and southeast. The explosion in 1917-1918 caused significant changes in the original structure of the towers and their height was reduced. In the fire in 2010, the tower located in the southeast direction heavily damaged by the fire, and its wooden cladding, carriers and lead cladding were burned. The coatings on the iron supports were removed and the rotten iron support elements were replaced. Those that were not rotten were repaired by sandblasting and repainting. After the iron frames were completed, the rotten wooden elements were replaced with materials that were compatible with the original, and those that could be preserved were preserved by maintenance and repair. After the towers' load-bearing elements were repaired and completed, water and heat insulation was applied and the top cover was made. In the tower section, load-bearing steel, wooden beams and rafters and wooden cladding, moisture barrier, heat insulation, water insulation, wooden cladding again and slate coating on the waterproofing were applied.

The station’s original roof structure, historically built with baroque-influenced timber trusses, was reconstructed.

Stone façades were treated with low-pressure micro-abrasion cleaning, followed by desalination procedures to address extensive salt crystallization due to proximity to the sea. Damaged joints were repointed with traditional lime mortar.

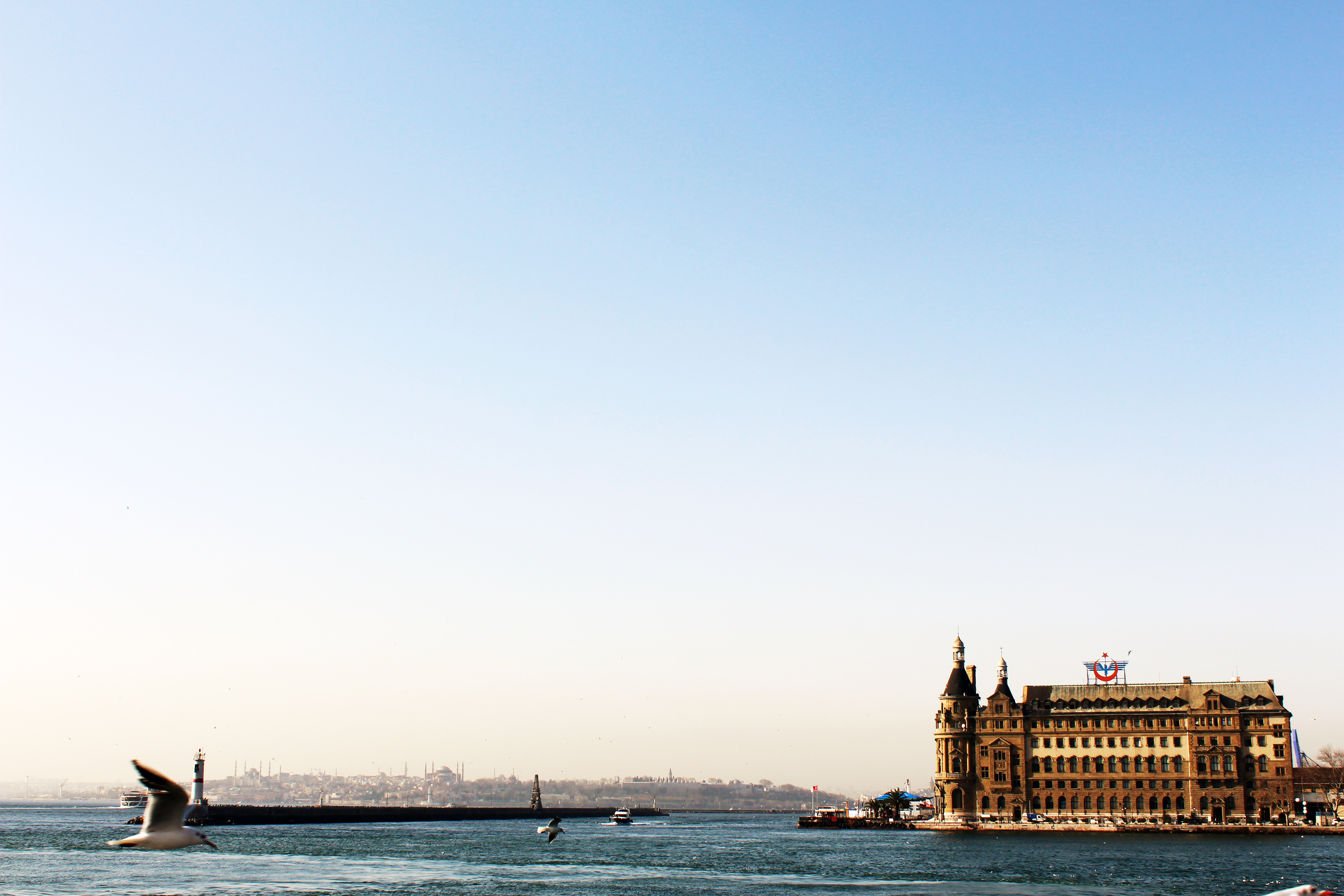
Haydarpaşa Terminal with Seraglio Point in the background.

== Historic monuments in the vicinity of the station ==
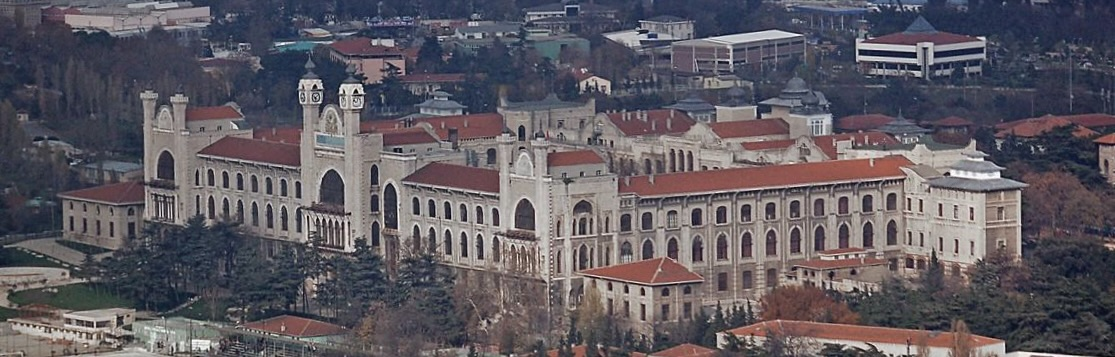
The nearby Haydarpaşa Campus of the Marmara University, originally built as the Imperial Medical School and designed by Alexander Vallaury and Raimondo D'Aronco.

The small Haydarpaşa Cemetery is dedicated to the British and Commonwealth soldiers who lost their lives during the Crimean War (1854–1856) and the two World Wars. It also contains the graves of members of the Levantine community who used to live in Kadıköy and Moda.

The north-west wing of the 19th-century Selimiye Barracks was transformed into a military hospital during the Crimean War and became the place where the nursing pioneer Florence Nightingale cared for wounded and infected British soldiers. Her room is maintained in a small museum which also contains other items dating from the Crimean War. Permission from the military is required before visiting the museum.

The buildings of the Haydarpaşa Numune Hospital, GATA Military Hospital, Dr. Siyami Ersek Hospital and the present-day Haydarpaşa Campus of the Marmara University designed by architects Alexander Vallaury and Raimondo D'Aronco are also near the station.

== See also ==
- Baghdad Railway
- Hejaz Railway
- Istanbul Sirkeci Terminal, the other major train terminal of Istanbul on the European side
- List of train stations in Turkey
- Public transport in Istanbul
