= Ertuğrulgazi Tunnel =

Ertuğrulgazi Tunnel Ertuğrulgazi Tüneli
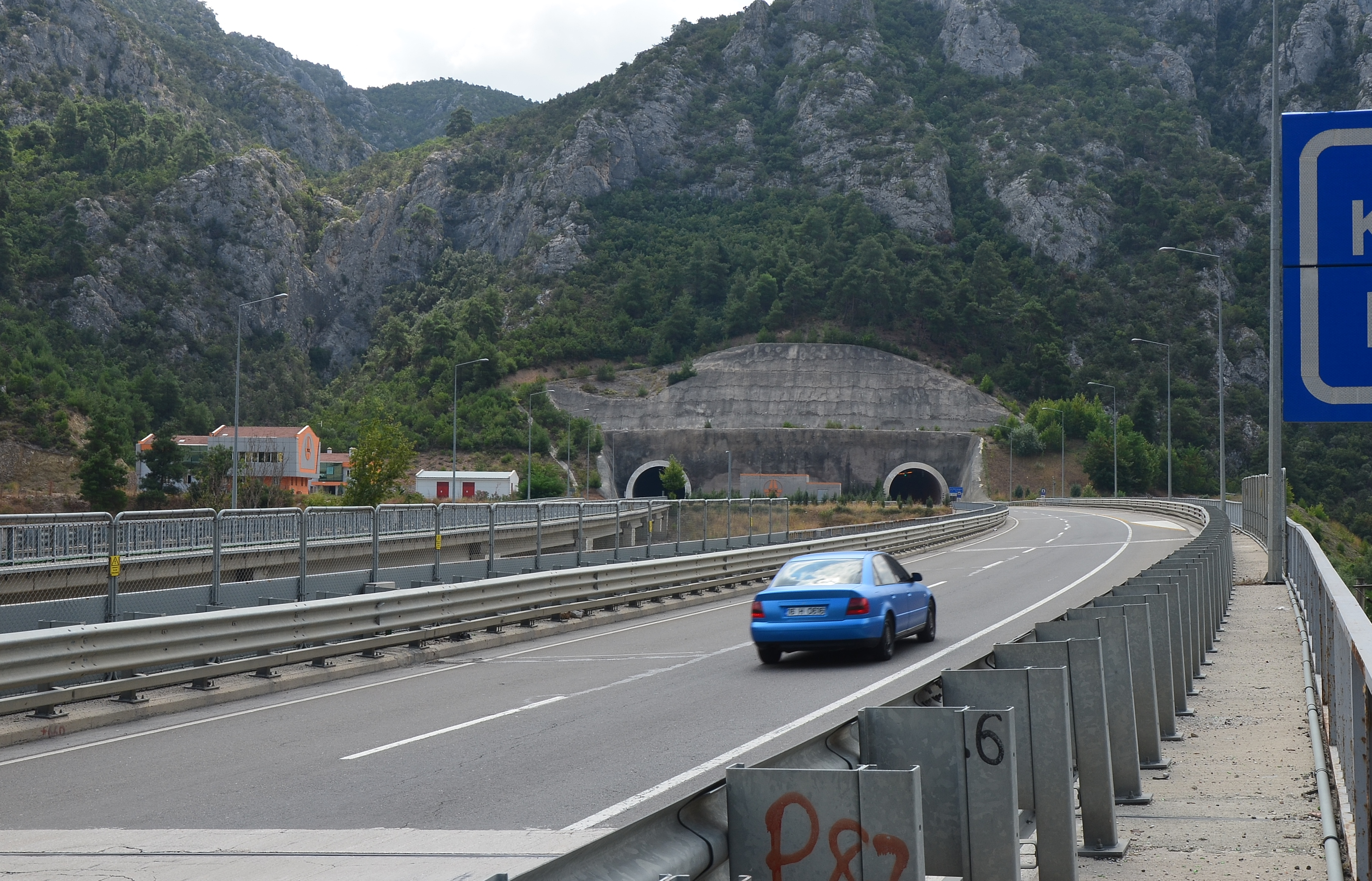
- Interactive map of Ertuğrulgazi Tunnel; Ertuğrulgazi Tüneli

Overview
- Location: Vezirhan–Bilecik, Turkey
- Coordinates: 40°12′07″N 30°01′13″E Location of Ertuğrulgazi Tunnel in Turkey
- Status: Operational
- Route: D.650

Operation
- Work began: 2003
- Opened: 2010; 16 years ago
- Operator: General Directorate of Highways
- Traffic: automotive

Technical
- Length: 745 and 840 m (2,444 and 2,756 ft)
- No. of lanes: 2 x 2
- Operating speed: 80 km/h (50 mph)

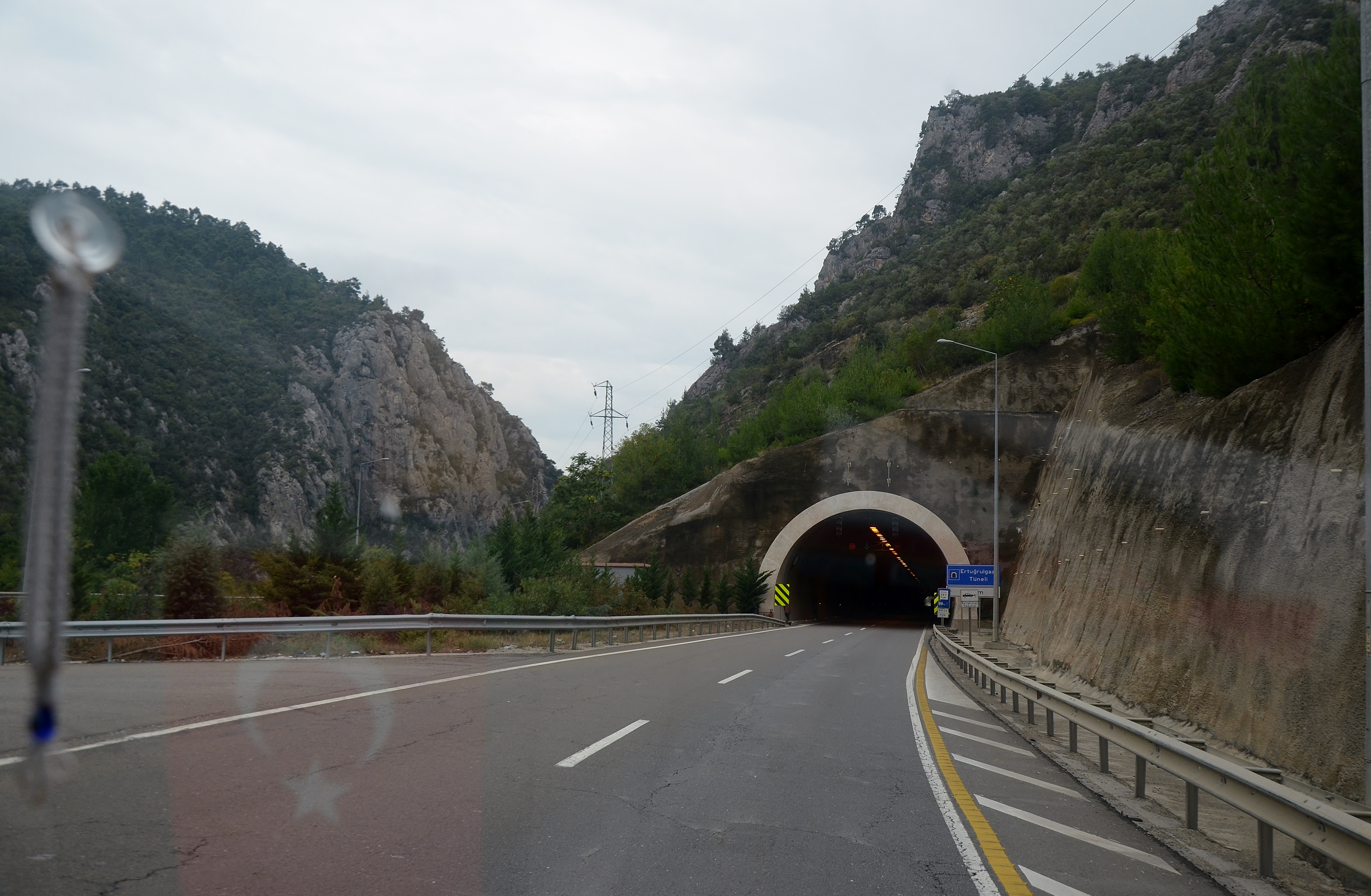
Ertuğrulgazi Tunnel.

The Ertuğrulgazi Tunnel (Turkish: Ertuğrulgazi Tüneli), is a road tunnel constructed on the Adapazarı–Bilecik state highway D.650 in Bilecik Province, western Turkey.

It is situated between Vezirhan and Bilecik bypassing the Gülümbe Pass with hairpin turns. The 745 and 840 m (2,444 and 2,756 ft)-long twin-tube tunnel carries two lanes of traffic in each direction. The 2,465 and 2,474 m (8,087 and 8,117 ft)-long Osmangazi Tunnel is located south of it. The highway Mekece-Bilecik-Bozüyük on the north-south directed D.650 at a distance of 86 km (53 mi) is a heavy traffic route for transport of industrial and agricultural products connecting the regions Marmara, Aegiean, Central Anatoli and Mediterranean.

In 2000, a financial agreement was signed between the Turkish and Japanese governments to build a divided highway with two tunnels at the steep pass. Construction works on the highway began in 2003, and in 2010 the route was put into service. The tunnel was initially named Kaletepe Tunnel, but was renamed in 2009 in honor of Ertuğrul Gazi (1191–1281) the father of Osman I, the founder of the Ottoman Empire.
