= Tersane railway station =

Railway station in Istanbul, Turkey

Tersane
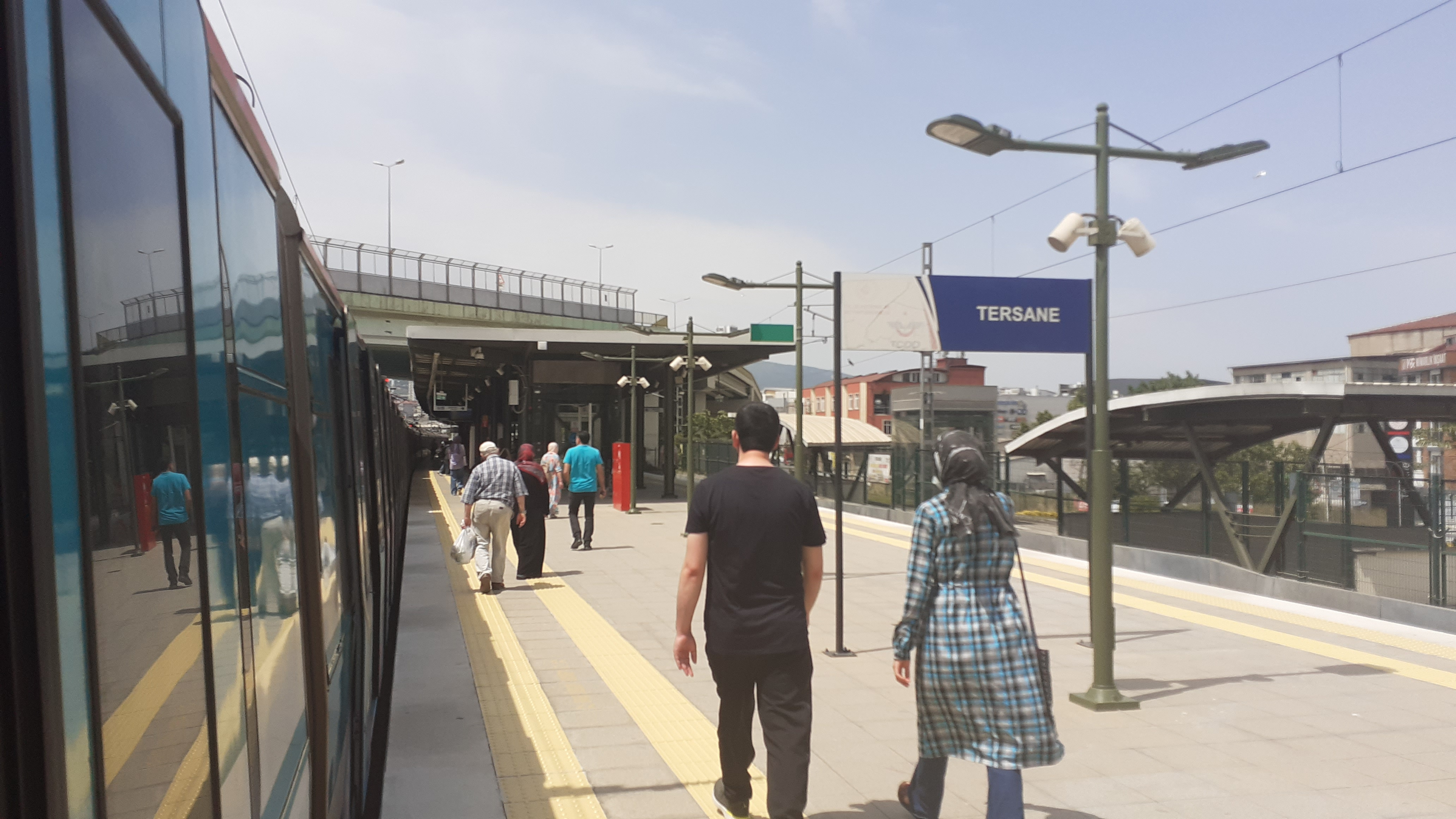
- Photo from the station platform

General information
- Location: Bağdat Cd., Güzelyalı Mah. 34903; Pendik, Istanbul; Turkey
- Coordinates: 40.8604°N 29.2736°E
- Owner: Turkish State Railways
- Operator: TCDD Taşımacılık
- Line: Istanbul-Ankara railway
- Platforms: 1 island platform
- Tracks: 3

Construction
- Structure type: At-grade
- Parking: No
- Accessible: Yes

History
- Closed: 2012-18
- Rebuilt: 2013-14
- Electrified: 29 May 1969; 25 kV AC, 50 Hz

Services
Preceding station	TCDD Taşımacılık	Following station
Kaynarca towards Halkalı	Marmaray	Güzelyalı towards Gebze
Former services
Preceding station	Turkish State Railways	Following station
Kaynarca towards Haydarpaşa	Haydarpaşa suburban	Güzelyalı towards Gebze
Location

Tersane railway station (Turkish: Tersane istasyonu) is a railway station in Pendik, Istanbul, on the Marmaray line. Up until 2012, the station was a stop on the Haydarpaşa suburban commuter rail line. The original station consisted of two side platforms with two tracks. The station gets its name from the nearby Pendik Shipyards, as Tersane is Turkish for shipyard.

Tersane station was closed down on 1 February 2012, when all train traffic between Pendik and Arifiye was temporarily suspended due to construction of the Ankara-Istanbul high-speed railway. The station was demolished shortly after and a new station was built in its place. The new station consists of an island platform serving two tracks, with a third express track on the south side.

Tersane station was opened on March 12, 2019, along with the entire Marmaray line.
