= Güzelyalı railway station =

Railway station in Istanbul, Turkey

Güzelyalı
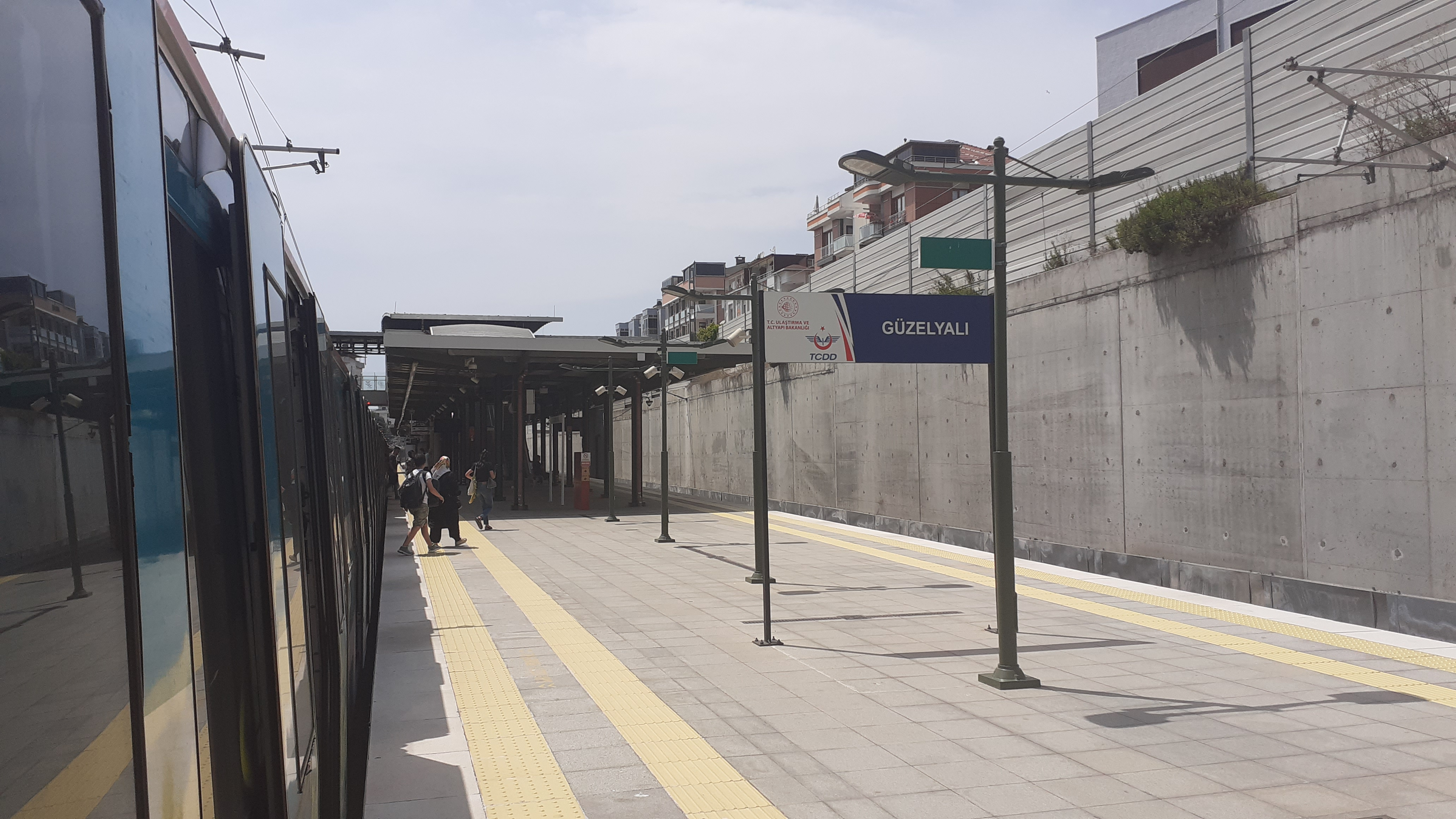

General information
- Location: Bağdat Cd., Güzelyalı Mah. 34903; Pendik, Istanbul; Turkey
- Coordinates: 40.8569°N 29.2835°E
- Owner: Turkish State Railways
- Operator: TCDD Taşımacılık
- Line: Istanbul-Ankara railway
- Platforms: 1 island platform
- Tracks: 3

Construction
- Structure type: At-grade
- Parking: No
- Accessible: Yes

History
- Opened: 1959
- Closed: 2012-18
- Rebuilt: 2013-14
- Electrified: 29 May 1969; 25 kV AC, 50 Hz

Services
Preceding station	TCDD Taşımacılık	Following station
Tersane towards Halkalı	Marmaray	Aydıntepe towards Gebze
Former services
Preceding station	Turkish State Railways	Following station
Tersane towards Haydarpaşa	Haydarpaşa suburban	Aydıntepe towards Gebze
Location

Güzelyalı railway station (Turkish: Güzelyalı istasyonu) is a railway station in Pendik, Istanbul, on the Marmaray line. It was a stop on the Haydarpaşa suburban commuter rail line until 2012. The original station had two side platforms with two tracks.

The station was closed on 1 February 2012, when all train traffic between Pendik and Arifiye was temporarily suspended due to construction of the Ankara-Istanbul high-speed railway. It was demolished shortly thereafter and a new station built in its place, consisting of an island platform serving two tracks, with a third express track on the south side.

Güzelyalı Station opened in 12 March 2019 along with the entire Marmaray line.
