= Aydıntepe railway station =

Railway station in Istanbul, Turkey

Aydıntepe
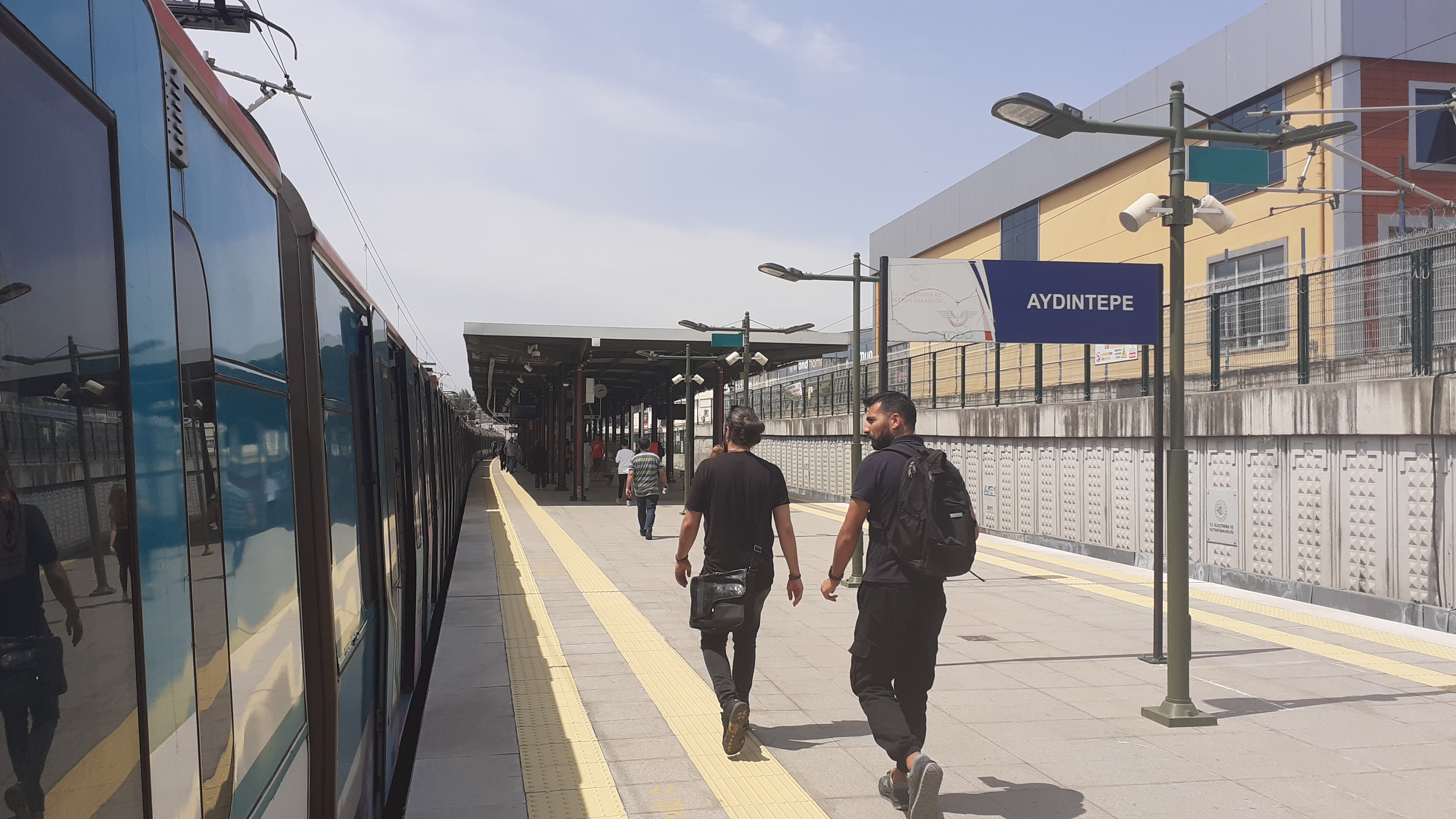

General information
- Location: Sahil Blv, Aydıntepe Mah. 34947; Tuzla, Istanbul; Turkey
- Coordinates: 40.8522°N 29.2932°E
- Owner: Turkish State Railways
- Operator: TCDD Taşımacılık
- Line: Istanbul-Ankara railway
- Platforms: 1 island platform
- Tracks: 3

Construction
- Structure type: At-grade
- Parking: No
- Accessible: Yes

History
- Closed: 2012-18
- Rebuilt: 2013-14
- Electrified: 29 May 1969; 25 kV AC, 50 Hz

Services
Preceding station	TCDD Taşımacılık	Following station
Güzelyalı towards Halkalı	Marmaray	İçmeler towards Gebze
Former services
Preceding station	Turkish State Railways	Following station
Güzelyalı towards Haydarpaşa	Haydarpaşa suburban	İçme towards Gebze
Location

Aydıntepe railway station (Turkish: Aydıntepe istasyonu) is a railway station in Tuzla, Istanbul. Up until 2012, the station was a stop on the Haydarpaşa suburban commuter rail line. The original station consisted of two side platforms with two tracks.

Aydıntepe station was closed down on 1 February 2012, when all train traffic between Pendik and Arifiye was temporarily suspended due to construction of the Ankara-Istanbul high-speed railway. The station was demolished shortly after and a new station was built in its place. The new station consists of an island platform serving two tracks, with a third express track on the south side.

Aydıntepe station is opened on 12 March 2019 along with the entire Marmaray line.
