= Ankara Express =

Passenger train service

Ankara Ekspresi
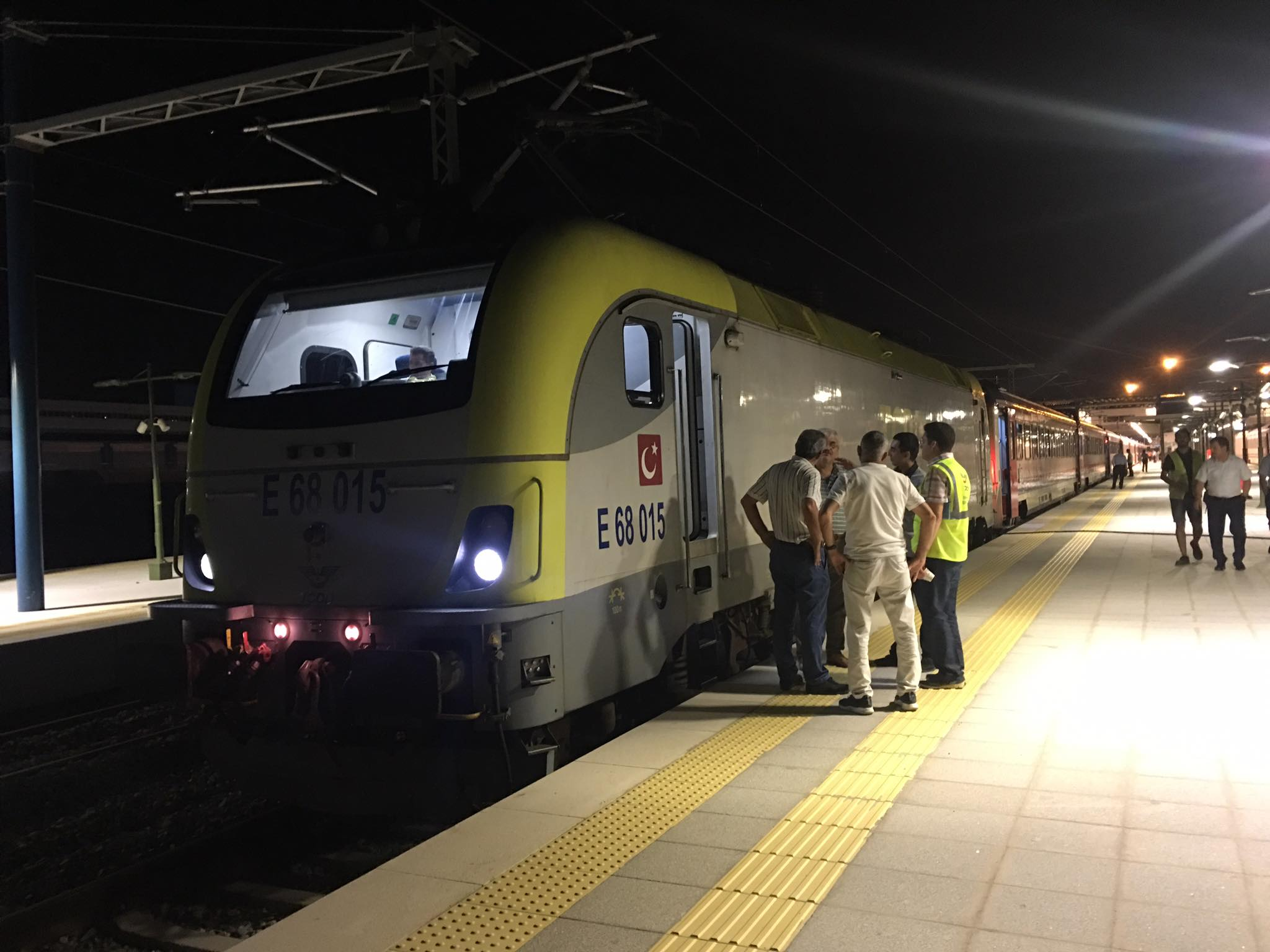
- The eastbound train waiting to depart Halkalı.

Overview
- Service type: Inter-city rail
- Status: Operating
- Locale: Central Anatolia
- First service: 12 December 1975
- Current operator: TCDD Taşımacılık
- Former operator: Turkish State Railways

Route
- Termini: Halkalı station, Istanbul; Ankara station, Ankara
- Stops: 15 (Istanbul-Ankara); 14 (Ankara-Istanbul)
- Distance travelled: 610.3 km (379.2 mi)
- Average journey time: 8 hours, 25 minutes (Istanbul-Ankara); 8 hours, 46 minutes (Ankara-Istanbul)
- Service frequency: Daily each way

On-board services
- Classes: Reserved Coach, Sleeper
- Seating arrangements: 2+1 seating
- Sleeping arrangements: Couchette and private sleeping rooms
- Catering facilities: On-board dining car

Technical
- Rolling stock: TVS2000
- Track gauge: 1,435 mm (4 ft 8 1/2 in)
- Electrification: Yes
- Track owner: Turkish State Railways

The Ankara Express (Turkish: Ankara Ekspresi) is a daily overnight intercity passenger train, operated by TCDD Taşımacılık, between Istanbul and Ankara, with major stops at İzmit and Eskişehir. The train makes the 610.3 km (379.2 mi) long journey in about 8 1/2 hours.

There are two iterations of the Ankara Express; the first iteration began service in 1975 and departed Haydarpaşa station in Istanbul. This service was discontinued in 2014, with the completion of the Ankara-Istanbul high-speed railway. Following the opening of the Marmaray commuter rail system in 2019, the Ankara Express was brought back, departing from Halkalı station. With this re-routing, the Ankara Express became the first non-high-speed intercity train service to use the Marmaray Tunnel under the Bosphorus.

The train was operated by the Turkish State Railways between 1975 and 2014, and is currently operated by TCDD Taşımacılık since its revival in 2019.

== Operations ==
The Ankara Express operates daily, in each direction. Both trains depart their respective origins at 22:00 (TRT).

=== Route Details ===
The Ankara Express begins its eastbound journey from Halkalı station, on the European side of Istanbul. Departing the station at 22:00, the train uses southernmost express track to bypass Marmaray commuter rail service and stations. Traveling along the southern shore of Istanbul, the Ankara Express stops at Bakırköy, before heading into the Marmaray Tunnel a few kilometers after. The train traverses the entire tunnel, without stopping at any of the stations within; transit time of the tunnel takes about 10 minutes. Using the tunnel, the train traverses the Bosphorus strait, exiting Europe and entering Asia (Anatolia).

On the Asian side, the Ankara Express exits the tunnel in Kadıköy and joins the Istanbul-Ankara railway shortly after. The next station the train calls at is Söğütlüçeşme. Connections here to the Metrobüs BRT service are available. Following the station, the train once again uses the southern express track to bypass Marmaray trains, while calling at Bostancı, Pendik and Gebze. During this stretch the Ankara Express generally passes the last YHT high-speed train of the day from Ankara, barring delays.

After Gebze, track speed increases to 160 km/h (99 mph) until İzmit, but generally for high-speed trains. Intercity trains generally travel this stretch between 120 km/h (75 mph) and 140 km/h (87 mph). Hugging the north shore of the Gulf of İzmit, the train travels through the heavily industrialized region west of İzmit, before reaching İzmit station shortly after midnight.

Following İzmit, the Ankara Express continues along the Istanbul-Ankara railway, while the high-speed railway continues parallel to the line. After exiting İzmit's eastern suburbs and passing just south of Lake Sapanca, the train arrives at Arifiye, turns south and follows the Sakarya River through the Samanlı Mountains. The double-track section of the railway ends at Geyve, about 10 km (6.2 mi) east of Pamukova. After a brief straight section of track through the Pamukova plain, the train winds through the Katırlı Mountains until reaching Bilecik, where it has a brief stop. After Bilecik, the Ankara Express continues its climb through the Sündiken Mountains until reaching Bozüyük in the far west of the Central Anatolian Plains.

Once exiting the mountains, track speed increases to 140 km/h (87 mph). The Ankara Express arrives in Eskişehir in the middle of the night, stopping briefly. After departing, the train continues across the Central Anatolian Plain, consisting of rolling hills. As dawn breaks, the train reaches the western outskirts of Ankara, entering Sincan in the early morning. From here, the route is once again segregated between express and local service, as the Ankara Express uses the express track to bypass Başkentray commuter rail service. 29 km (18 mi) after Sincan station, the Ankara Express reaches Ankara station in central Ankara.
