= Osman Gazi (disambiguation) =

Osman Gazi refers to Osman I, the first Sultan of the Ottoman Empire.

Osman Gazi or Osmangazi may also refer to:

- Osmangazi, a municipality and district of Bursa Province, Turkey
- Osmangazi Tunnel, a road tunnel in western Turkey
- TCG Osmangazi (NL-125), an amphibious warfare ship of the Turkish Navy
- Osmangazi Bridge, a suspension bridge in southeast of Istanbul, Turkey
- Kuruluş: Osman, Turkish drama-series, also called Osman Ghazi

== See also ==
- Gazi Osman Pasha
