= İçmeler railway station =

Railway station in Istanbul, Turkey

İçmeler
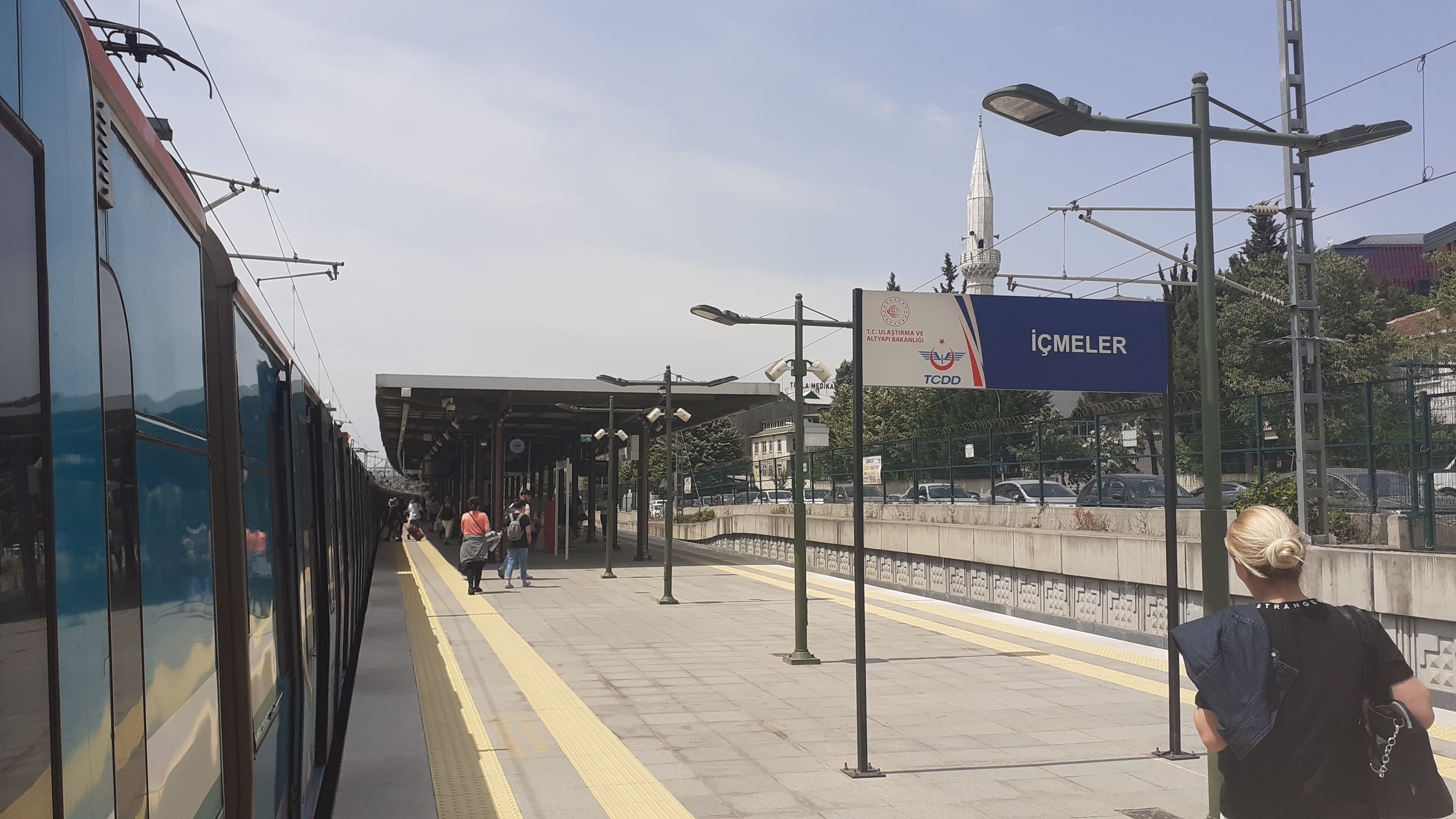

General information
- Location: Harmanlı Sk., İçmeler Mah., 34947; Tuzla, Istanbul; Turkey
- Coordinates: 40.8458°N 29.3000°E
- Owner: Turkish State Railways
- Operator: TCDD Taşımacılık
- Line: Istanbul-Ankara railway
- Platforms: 1 island platform
- Tracks: 3

Construction
- Structure type: At-grade
- Parking: No
- Accessible: Yes

History
- Opened: 1954
- Closed: 2012-18
- Rebuilt: 2013-14
- Electrified: 6 February 1977; 25 kV AC, 50 Hz
- Former names: İçme (1954-2012)

Services
| Preceding station | TCDD Taşımacılık | Following station |
|---|---|---|
| Aydıntepe towards Halkalı | Marmaray | Tuzla towards Gebze |
Former services
| Preceding station | Turkish State Railways | Following station |
|---|---|---|
| Pendik towards Istanbul | Adapazarı Express | Tuzla towards Adapazarı |
| Aydıntepe towards Haydarpaşa | Haydarpaşa suburban | Tuzla towards Gebze |
Track layout
Location

İçmeler railway station (Turkish: İçmeler istasyonu) is a railway station in Tuzla, Istanbul. The station was originally opened in 1954 by the Turkish State Railways, as İçme railway station and was a stop on the Haydarpaşa suburban commuter rail line. The original station consisted of two side platforms with two tracks. İçme station was also serviced by the popular Adapazarı Express regional rail service from Istanbul to Adapazarı.

The station was closed down on 1 February 2012, when all train traffic between Pendik and Arifiye was temporarily suspended due to construction of the Ankara-Istanbul high-speed railway. The station was demolished shortly after and a new station was built in its place. The new station consists of an island platform serving two tracks, with a third express track on the south side.

İçmeler station is opened in 12 March 2019 along with the entire Marmaray line.
