= Hereke railway station =

Railway station in Turkey

HEREKE

General information
- Location: Oral Pektaş Cd. 10, Hacı Akif Mah. 41800; Körfez, Kocaeli; Turkey
- Coordinates: 40.7843°N 30.6162°E
- System: TCDD regional rail station
- Owner: Turkish State Railways
- Operator: TCDD Taşımacılık
- Line: Istanbul-Ankara railway
- Platforms: 1 side platform
- Tracks: 2

Construction
- Structure type: At-grade
- Parking: Yes

History
- Opened: 8 January 1873
- Closed: 2012-17
- Electrified: 6 February 1977; 25 kV AC, 50 Hz

Services
Preceding station	TCDD Taşımacılık	Following station
Gebze Terminus	Ada Express	Yarımca towards Adapazarı
Former services
Preceding station	Turkish State Railways	Following station
Tavşancıl towards Istanbul	Adapazarı Express	Kirazyalı towards Adapazarı
Location

Hereke railway station (Turkish: Hereke istasyonu) is a railway station in Hereke, Turkey. TCDD Taşımacılık operates four daily regional trains between Istanbul and Adapazarı that stop at the station. The station was originally built in 1873 by the Ottoman government as part of a railway from Kadıköy to İzmit.

Hereke station was closed down on 1 February 2012 due to construction of the Ankara-Istanbul high-speed railway. The station was reopened on 4 August 2017.
