= Kaynarca railway station =

Railway station in Istanbul, Turkey

Kaynarca
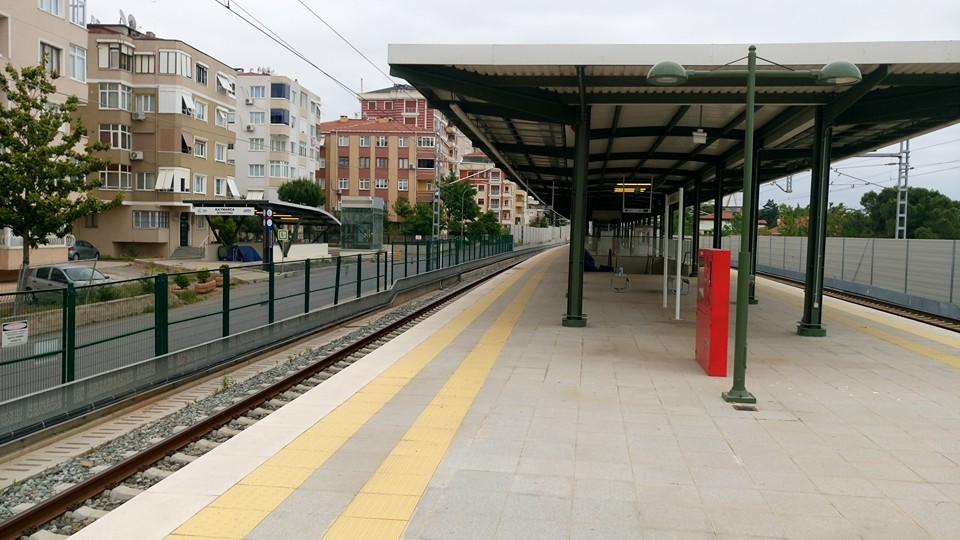
- The rebuilt station in 2016.

General information
- Location: İbni Sina Cd., Kaynarca Mah., 34890; Pendik/Istanbul; Turkey
- Coordinates: 40.8711°N 29.2562°E
- System: TCDD Taşımacılık commuter rail station
- Owner: Turkish State Railways
- Line: Istanbul-Ankara railway
- Platforms: 1 island platform
- Tracks: 3

Construction
- Structure type: At-grade
- Accessible: Yes

History
- Opened: 1967, 2019
- Closed: 2012-18
- Rebuilt: 2013-14
- Electrified: 29 May 1969; 25 kV AC, 60 Hz

Passengers
- 2016: 0 0%

Services
Preceding station	TCDD Taşımacılık	Following station
Pendik towards Halkalı	Marmaray	Tersane towards Gebze
Former services
Preceding station	Turkish State Railways	Following station
Pendik towards Haydarpaşa	Haydarpaşa suburban	Tersane towards Gebze
Track layout
Location

Kaynarca station (Turkish: Kaynarca istasyonu) is a railway station in the Kaynarca neighborhood of Pendik, Istanbul. The station was originally built in 1967 by the Turkish State Railways in anticipation of electric commuter rail service from Haydarpaşa to Gebze. The station was closed down 29 April 2012 and demolished shortly after. A new station was built in its place in 2014 as part of the rehabilitation of the railway for the Marmaray commuter rail system. The station was reopened on 12 March 2019.
