= Tavşancıl railway station =

Railway station in Turkey on Istanbul-Ankara railway

TAVŞANCIL

General information
- Location: D.100, Tavşancıl Mah., 41455; Dilovası, Kocaeli; Turkey
- Coordinates: 40.7682°N 29.5696°E
- Owner: Turkish State Railways
- Platforms: 2 (1 island platform, 1 side platform)
- Tracks: 4

Construction
- Structure type: At-grade

History
- Opened: 8 January 1873; 4 August 2017
- Closed: 1 February 2012
- Rebuilt: 1975
- Electrified: 6 February 1977; 25 kV AC, 50 Hz Overhead wire
Former services
Preceding station	Turkish State Railways	Following station
Diliskelesi towards Istanbul	Adapazarı Express	Hereke towards Adapazarı
Location

Tavşancıl railway station was a railway station in Tavşancıl, Turkey on the Istanbul-Ankara railway. It was located in the southern part of the town on the shore of the Gulf of İzmit. The station was a stop on the Adapazarı Express regional train service; 11 daily eastbound trains and 13 daily westbound trains stopped at Tavşancıl. The opening date of the station is unclear, but the station was rebuilt and expanded in 1975, when the Turkish State Railways double-tracked the railway from Gebze to Arifiye. Tavşancıl station closed on 1 February 2012 and the platforms were demolished shortly after.
