= Republic Express =

Cumhuriyet Ekspresi
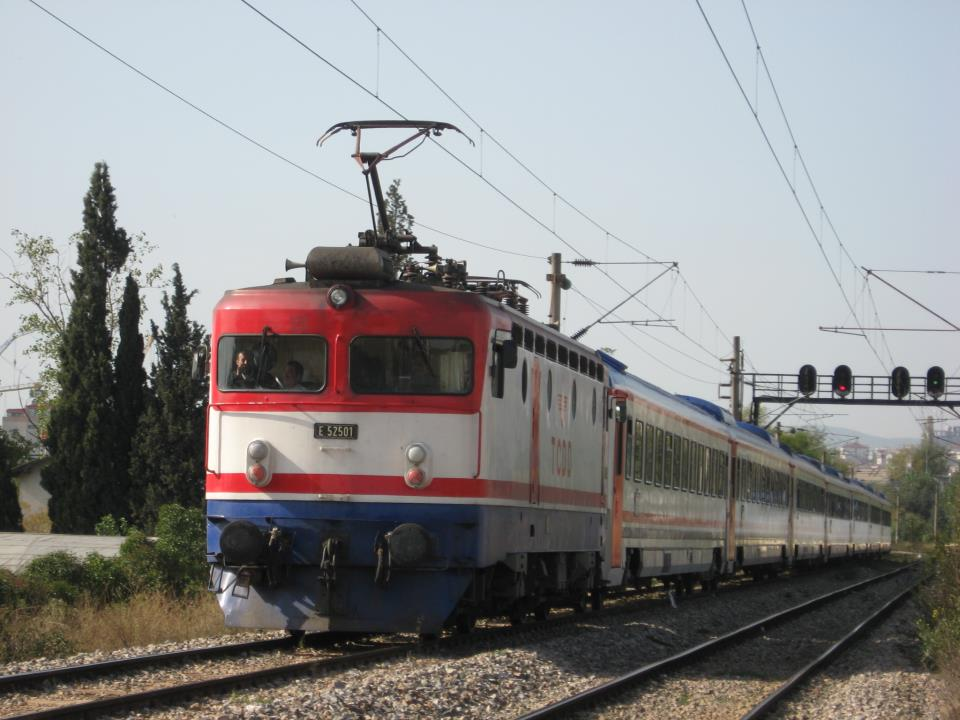
- The Republic Express in 2008.

Overview
- Service type: Inter-city rail
- Status: Discontinued
- Locale: Central Anatolia
- First service: 29 October 2002
- Last service: 31 January 2012
- Former operator: Turkish State Railways

Route
- Termini: Haydarpaşa station, Istanbul; Ankara station, Ankara (2002-09) Eskişehir station, Eskişehir (2009-2012)
- Stops: 12
- Distance travelled: 313 km (194 mi)
- Average journey time: 3 hours, 57 minutes
- Service frequency: Daily each way

On-board services
- Seating arrangements: 2+1 seating
- Catering facilities: On-board dining car

Technical
- Rolling stock: TVS2000
- Track gauge: 1,435 mm (4 ft 8 1/2 in)
- Electrification: Yes
- Track owner: Turkish State Railways

The Republic Express (Turkish: Cumhuriyet Ekspresi) was a passenger train operated by the Turkish State Railways. The train ran between Haydarpaşa Terminal in Istanbul and Ankara. After the Yüksek Hızlı Tren was put into service in 2009, the route of the Republic express was cut from Ankara to Eskişehir. On 31 January 2012, the Republic Express was discontinued due to the rehabilitation of the railway between Istanbul and Arifye and replaced with high speed service.

== Gallery ==
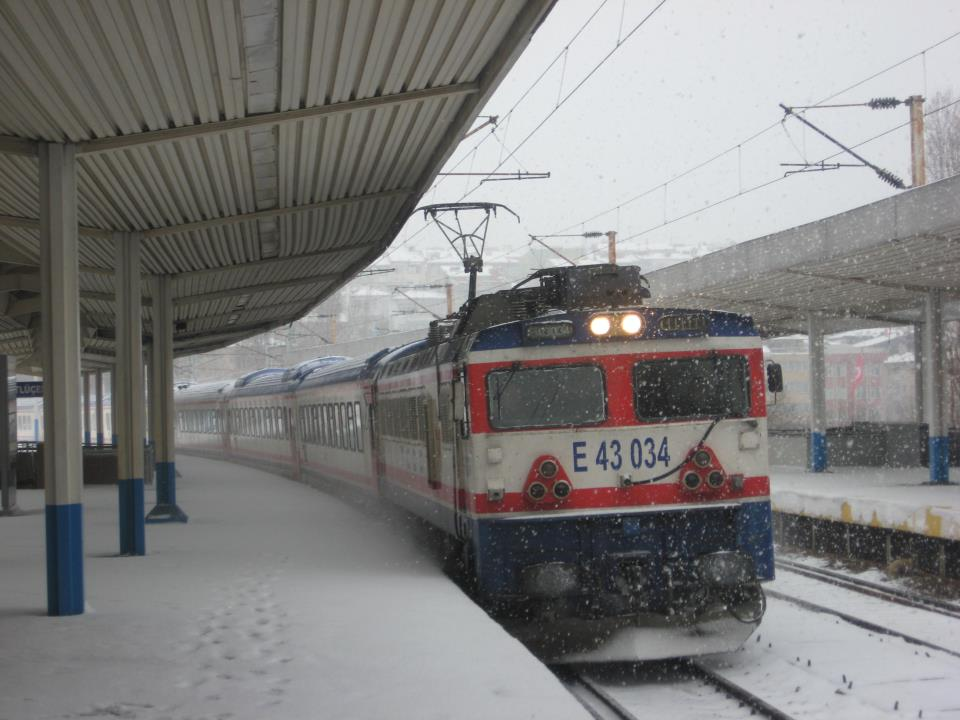
The eastbound train entering Söğütlüçeşme.

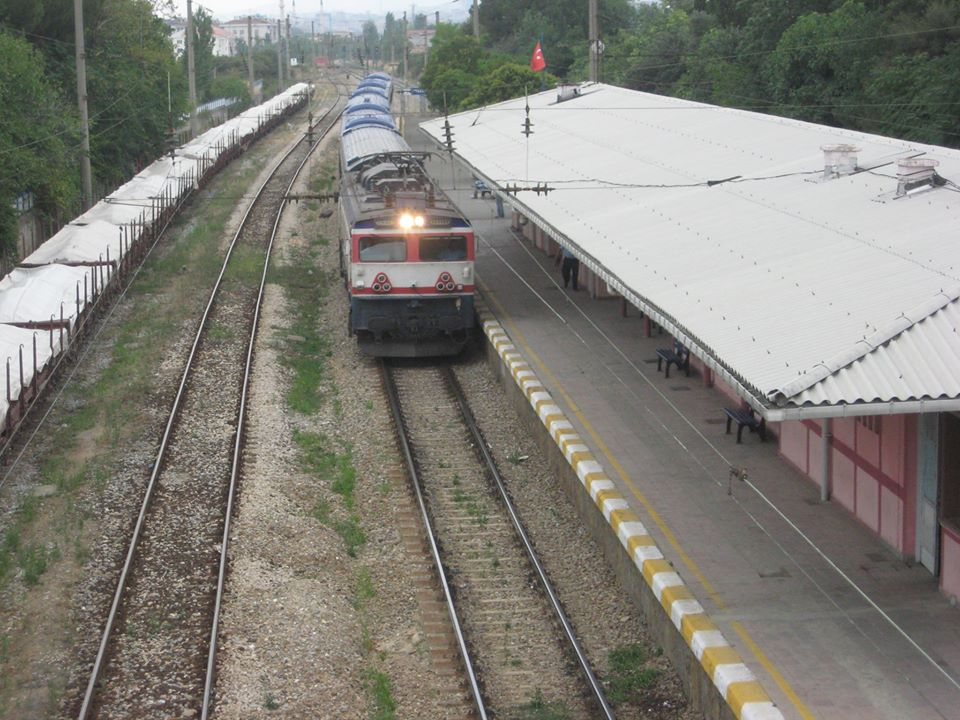
The eastbound train passing Tuzla station.
