= Kaynarca, Pendik =

Kaynarca
- Neighbourhood
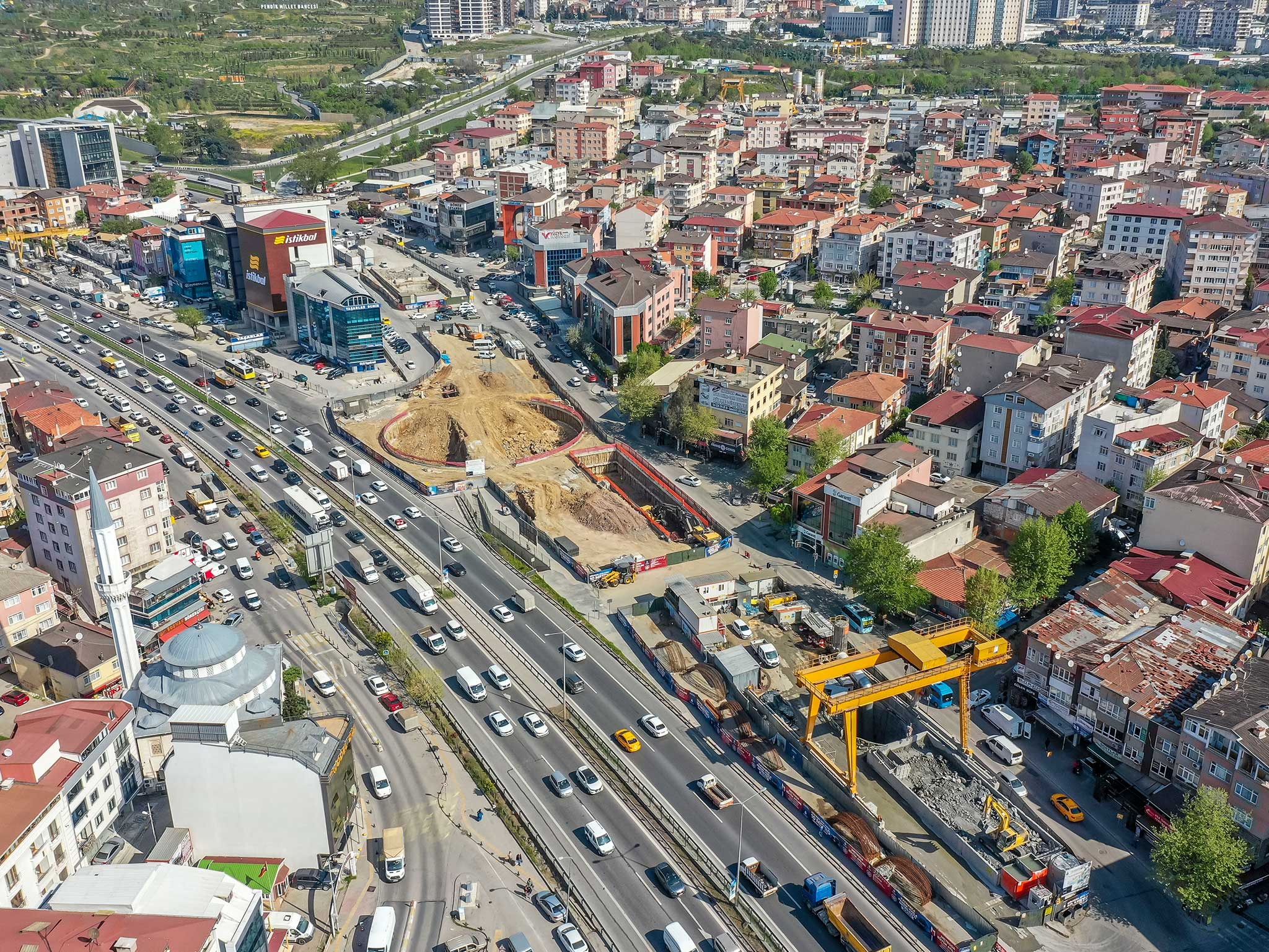
- Kaynarca central station

- Location within Turkey Location within Istanbul
- Coordinates: 40°52′04″N 29°15′41″E
- Country: Turkey
- Province: Istanbul
- District: Pendik
- Population (2022): 47,493
- Time zone: UTC+3 (TRT)

Kaynarca is a neighbourhood in the municipality and district of Pendik, Istanbul Province, Turkey. Its population is 47,493 (2022). The current headman of Kaynarca is Birol Okay. Kaynarca railway station is served by local trains on the Marmaray line.

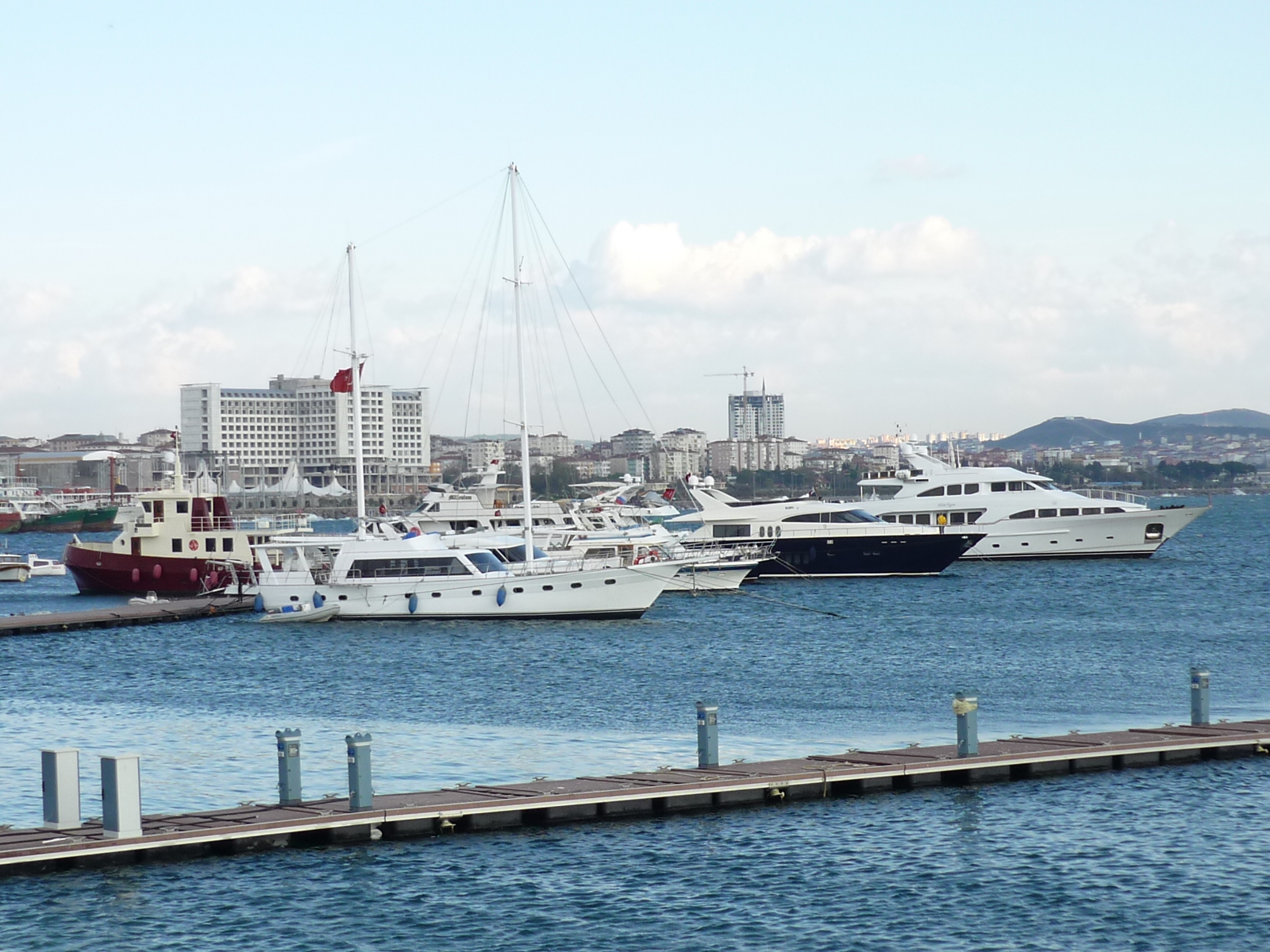
A view from Kaynarca shores
