= Çayırova railway station =

Railway station in Çayırova, Turkey

Çayırova
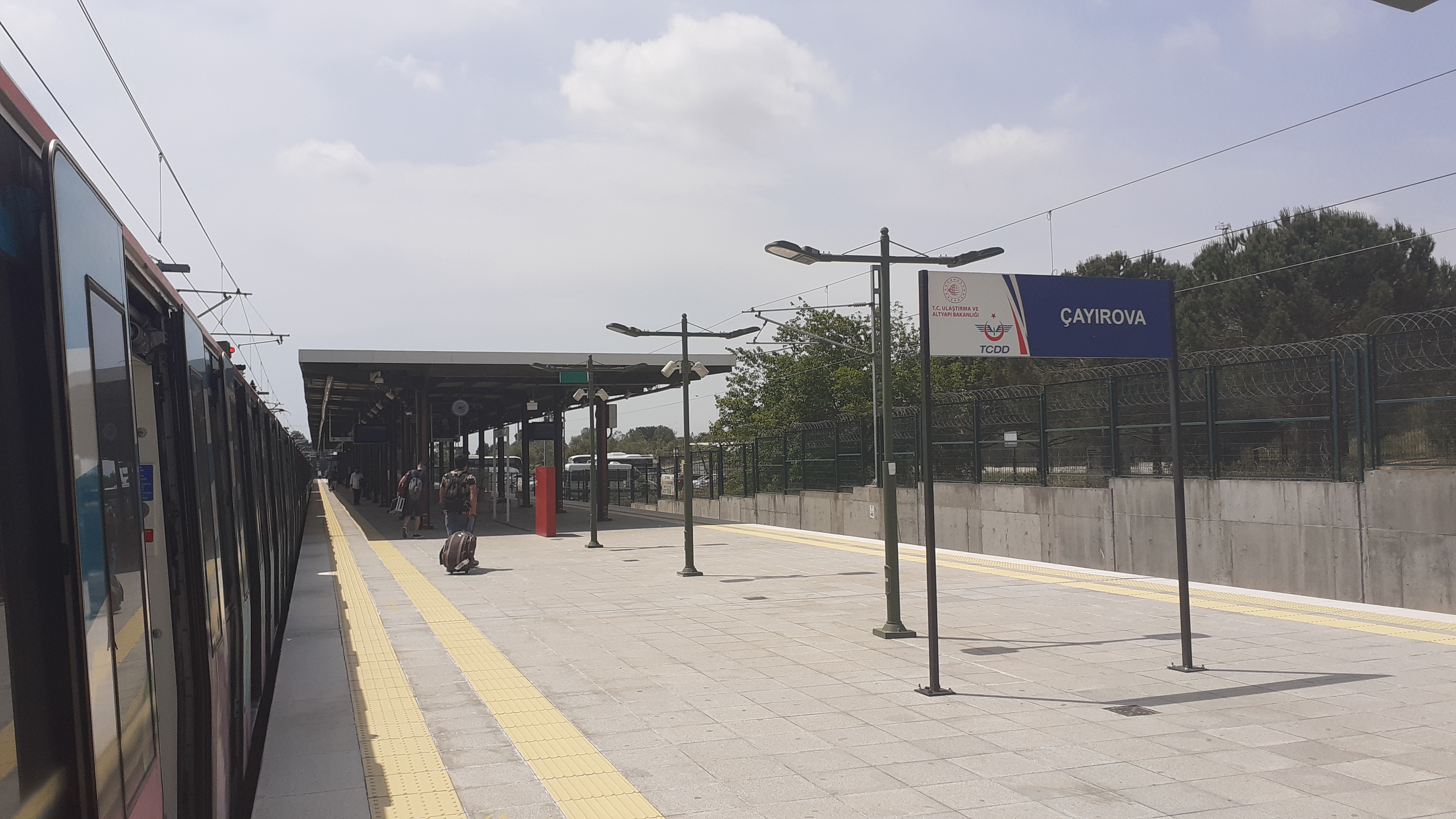

General information
- Location: Gebze Teknik Üni. Kampüs, Çayırova Mah., 41420; Çayırova, Kocaeli; Turkey
- Coordinates: 40.8105°N 29.3475°E
- System: TCDD Taşımacılık commuter rail station
- Owner: Turkish State Railways
- Operator: Marmaray
- Line: Istanbul-Ankara railway
- Platforms: 1 island platform
- Tracks: 3

Construction
- Structure type: At-grade
- Accessible: Yes

History
- Opened: 1954
- Closed: 2013-19

Services
Preceding station	TCDD Taşımacılık	Following station
Tuzla towards Halkalı	Marmaray	Fatih towards Gebze
Former services
Preceding station	Turkish State Railways	Following station
Tuzla towards Haydarpaşa	Haydarpaşa suburban	Fatih towards Gebze
Track layout
Location

Çayırova railway station (Turkish: Çayırova istasyonu) is a railway station in Çayırova, Turkey. It is one of two stations (the other being Fatih) located within the campus of the Gebze Technical University. The station was originally built in 1954 by the Turkish State Railways and between 1969 and 2013, it was a stop along the Haydarpaşa suburban. In 2013, the station was closed and subsequently demolished to make way for a new station and the widening of the railway. The Çayırova station was structurally completed in 2014, along with the other eight stations located between Pendik and Gebze; but due to delays with the project, the station was not served by any train. Commuter rail service resumed on 13 March 2019.

The station has two tracks with an island platform and one express track on the south side for high-speed and intercity trains.
