= Osmangazi Tunnel =

Road tunnel in western Turkey

Osmangazi Tunnel Osmangazi Tüneli
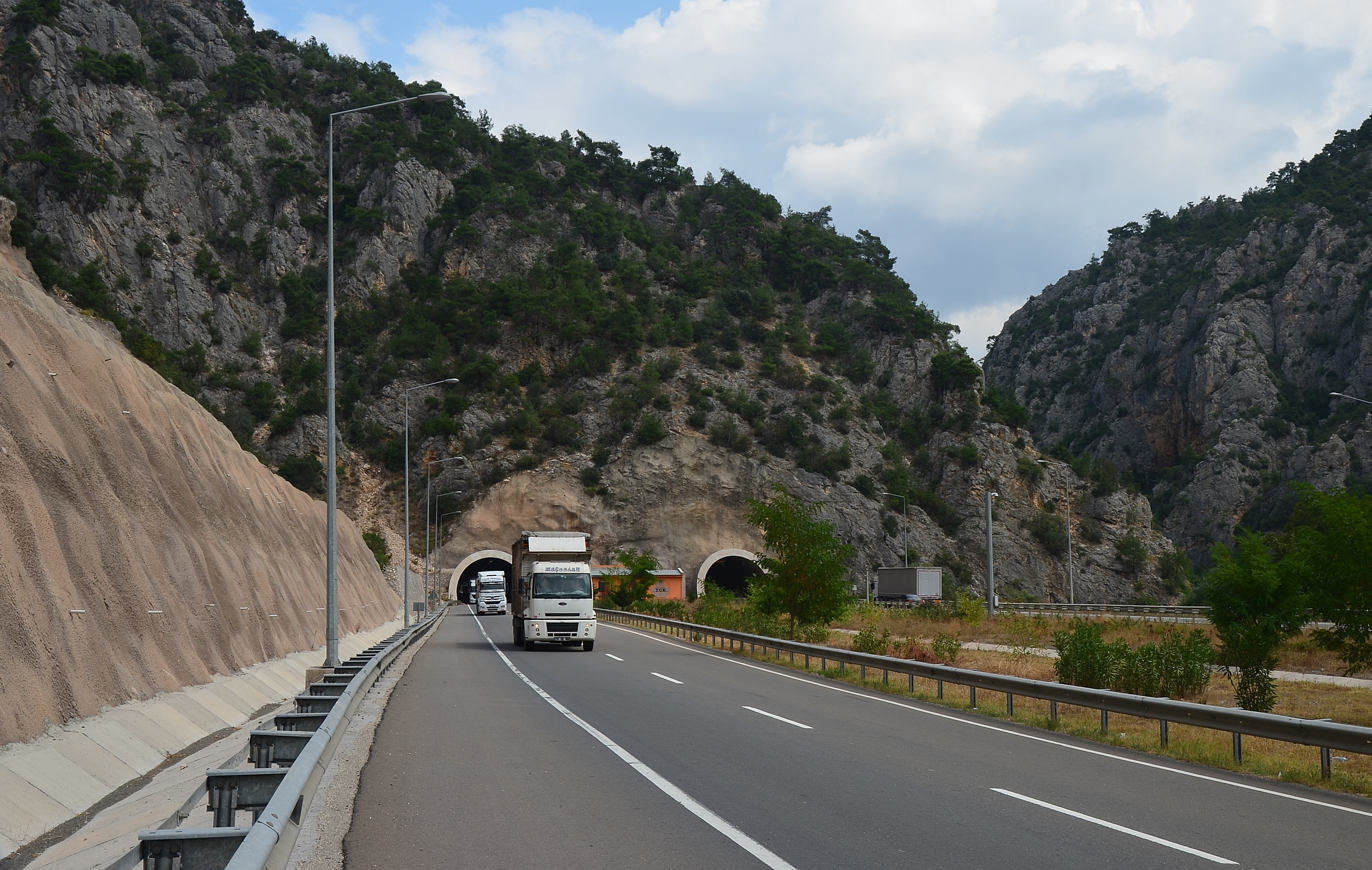
- Osmangazi Tunnel (south side)
- Interactive map of Osmangazi Tunnel; Osmangazi Tüneli

Overview
- Location: Vezirhan–Bilecik, Turkey
- Coordinates: 40°10′58″N 30°00′57″E Location of Osmangazi Tunnel in Turkey
- Status: Operational
- Route: D.650

Operation
- Work began: 2003
- Opened: 2010; 16 years ago
- Operator: General Directorate of Highways
- Traffic: automotive

Technical
- Length: 2,465 and 2,474 m (8,087 and 8,117 ft)
- No. of lanes: 2 x 2
- Operating speed: 80 km/h (50 mph)

The Osmangazi Tunnel (Turkish: Osmangazi Tüneli), formerly Kocatepe Tunnel, is a road tunnel constructed on the Adapazarı–Bilecik state highway D.650 in Bilecik Province, western Turkey.

It is situated between Vezirhan and Bilecik bypassing the Gülümbe Pass with hairpin turns. The 2,465 and 2,474 m (8,087 and 8,117 ft)-long twin-tube tunnel carries two lanes of traffic in each direction. The 745 and 840 m (2,444 and 2,756 ft)-long Ertuğrulgazi Tunnel is located north of it. The highway Mekece-Bilecik-Bozüyük on the north-south directed D.650 at a distance of 86 km (53 mi) is a heavy traffic route for transport of industrial and agricultural products connecting the regions Marmara, Aegiean, Central Anatoli and Mediterranean.

In 2000, a financial agreement was signed between the Turkish and Japanese governments to build a divided highway with two tunnels at the steep pass. Construction works on the highway began in 2003, and in 2010 the route was put into service. The tunnel was initially named Kocatepe Tunnel, but was renamed in 2009 in honor of Osman Gazi (1258–1326), who founded the Ottoman Empire in the region.
