= Tuzla railway station =

Train stop in eastern Istanbul

Tuzla
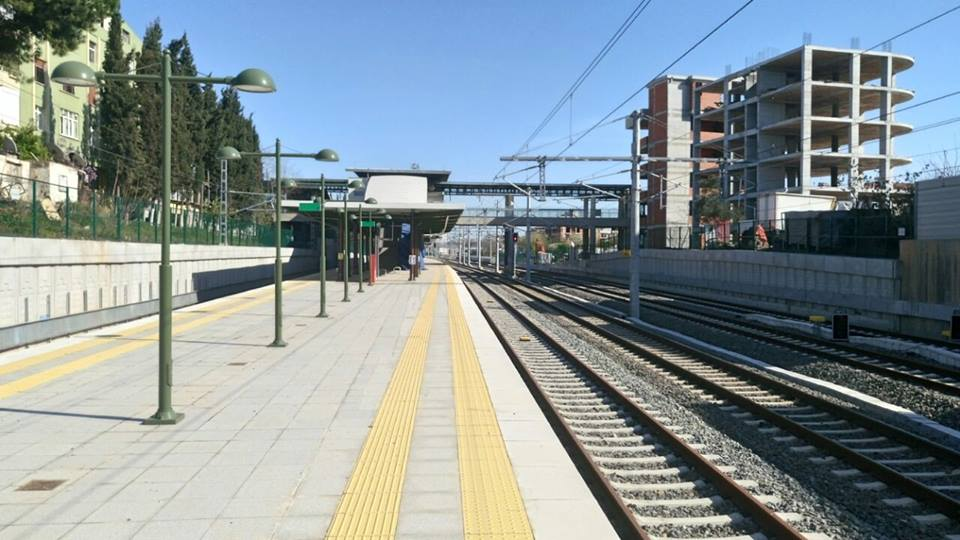
- Tuzla station after renovation.

General information
- Location: Medrese Sk., İstasyon Mah. 34940; Tuzla/Istanbul; Turkey
- Coordinates: 40.8301°N 29.3223°E
- System: TCDD Taşımacılık commuter rail station
- Owner: Turkish State Railways
- Line: Istanbul-Ankara railway
- Platforms: 1 island platform
- Tracks: 3
- Connections: IETT Bus: 130, KM12; Istanbul Minibüs: Deniz Harp Okulu-Aydınlı Toki; Pendik-Şifa Mahallesi; Tershaneler-Deniz Harp Okulu

Construction
- Structure type: At-grade
- Accessible: Yes

History
- Opened: 1 January 1873
- Closed: 2013-18
- Rebuilt: 2014-15

Passengers
- 2016: 0 0%

Services
Preceding station	TCDD Taşımacılık	Following station
İçmeler towards Halkalı	Marmaray	Çayırova towards Gebze
Former services
Preceding station	Turkish State Railways	Following station
İçme towards Istanbul	Adapazarı Express	Gebze towards Adapazarı
İçme towards Haydarpaşa	Haydarpaşa suburban	Çayırova towards Gebze
Track layout
Location

Tuzla station (Turkish: Tuzla istasyonu) is a station, under construction, on the Marmaray commuter rail line in Tuzla, Istanbul. It was previously a station on the Haydarpaşa suburban and the Haydarpaşa-Adapazarı Regional until 2013, when all train service east of Pendik was suspended. The new station consists of one island platform serving two local tracks with a third express track on the south side as well as a siding.

== History ==
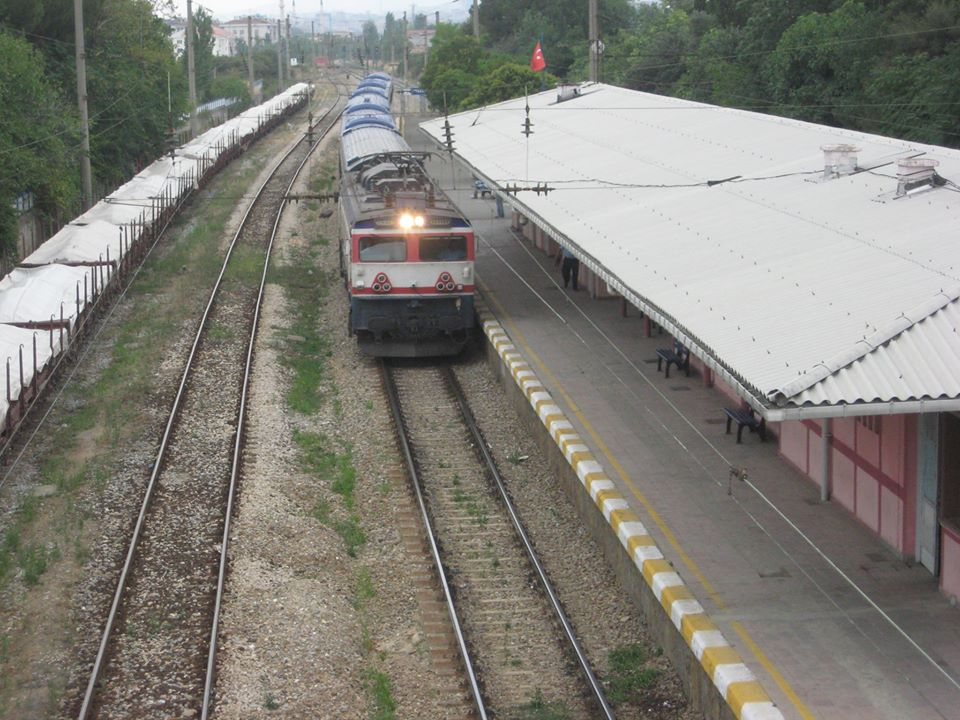
The eastbound Republic Express at Tuzla station in 2008.

Tuzla station was originally built in 1873 by the Ottoman government as part of a railway from Constantinople (modern-day Istanbul) to İzmit. The station (along with the railway) was sold to the Ottoman Anatolian Railway in 1888 and taken over by the Turkish State Railways in 1927. The station was rebuilt and expanded in 1949 and electric commuter train service was introduced in 1969. Tuzla station was closed down in 2013 for the rehabilitation of the railway in anticipation of Marmaray and YHT high-speed rail service.

=== 1994 Bombing ===
Tuzla station was the site of a terrorist attack on 12 December 1994. On the morning of 12 December at 9:12 AM, a time bomb placed in a trash can detonated, killing 5 people and injuring 29. The 5 people who died in the explosion were all cadets from the nearby Tuzla Infantry Academy, who were on their weekly leave. İsmail Kaya, Ekrem Okutan and Murat Tuncer died in the explosion, while the remaining two cadets were rushed to the hospital. Osman Bozdağoğlu and Cüneyt Bilen were pronounced dead at Kartal hospital a few hours later. The two perpetrators, Cumali Karsu and Enver Özek, were a part of the Kurdistan Workers' Party (PKK). They were captured shortly after the attack, along with Hediye Aybek and Şerif Mercan who were suspected of assisting Karsu and Özek. The court case, lasting until early 2000, found three of the four suspects guilty; Karsu and Özek were sentenced to death, while Aybek was sentenced to 12 years and 6 months in prison. Şerif Mercan however, committed suicide on 15 June 1994, before the court found a verdict.

== Station Layout ==
Fabrikalar Street		Entrances/Exits
Tracks	Track 1	← Marmaray toward Halkalı
Tracks	Island platform, doors will open on the left
Tracks	Track 2	Marmaray toward Gebze →
Tracks	Track 3	←Yüksek Hızlı Tren toward Söğütlüçeşme or Halkalı ←Ada Express toward Pendik
Tracks	Track 4	Yüksek Hızlı Tren toward Ankara or Konya → Ada Express toward Adapazarı →
Tracks	Track 5	Siding

== Connections ==
Connection to IETT Bus service is available on Hatboyu Avenue, on the south side of the station:

- KM12 — Tuzla Deniz Harp Okulu - Kartal Metro

There is also dolmuş service:

- C124-Aydınlı TOKİ Konutları-İçmeler-Tuzla-Deniz Harp Okulu
