= Gebze Teknik Üniversitesi–Fatih railway station =

Railway station in Kocaeli, Turkey

Gebze Teknik Üniversitesi–Fatih
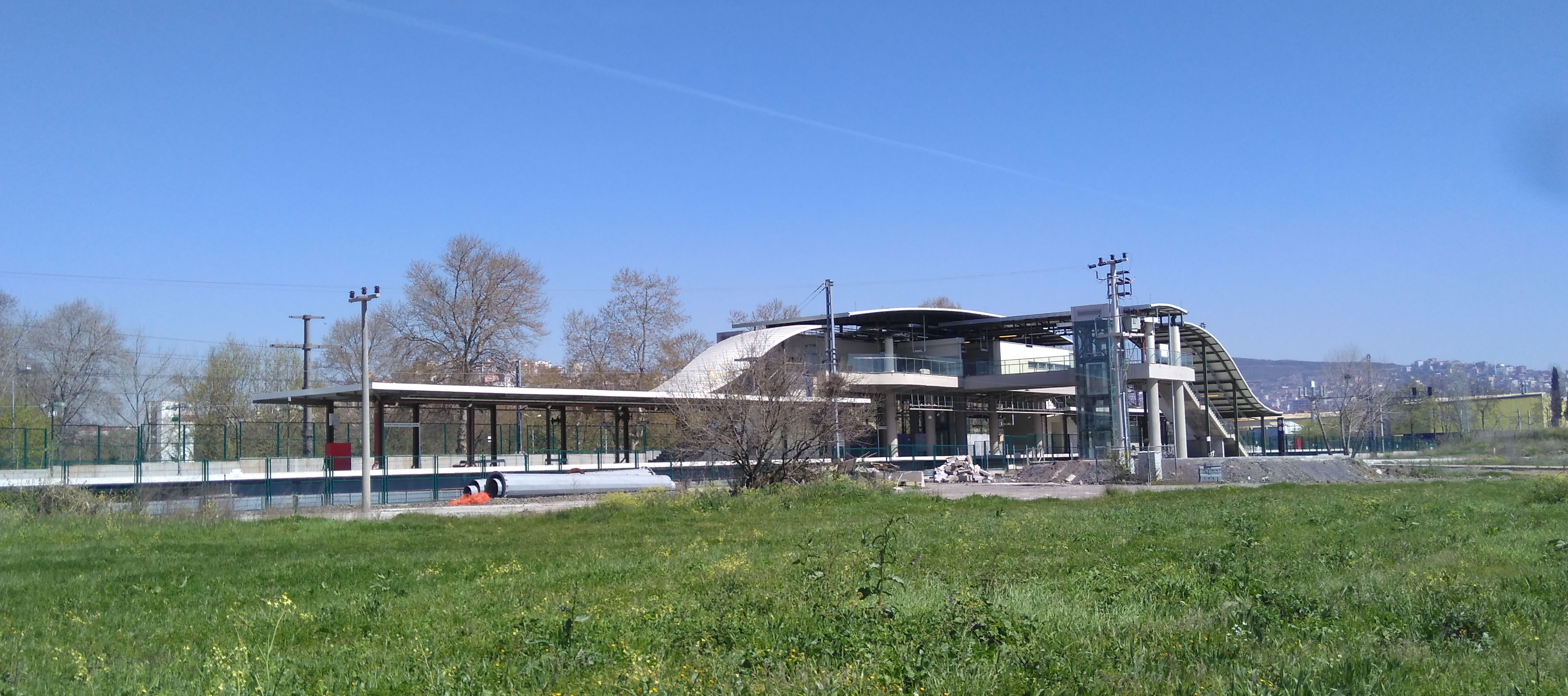

General information
- Location: Gebze Teknik Üniversitesi, Cumhuriyet Mah. 41420; Gebze, Kocaeli; Turkey
- Coordinates: 40.8075°N 29.3640°E
- System: TCDD Taşımacılık commuter rail station
- Owner: Turkish State Railways
- Operator: Marmaray
- Line: Istanbul-Ankara railway
- Platforms: 1 island platform
- Tracks: 3

Construction
- Structure type: At-grade
- Accessible: Yes

History
- Opened: 1992
- Closed: 2013-19

Services
Preceding station	TCDD Taşımacılık	Following station
Çayırova towards Halkalı	Marmaray	Osmangazi towards Gebze
Former services
Preceding station	Turkish State Railways	Following station
Çayırova towards Haydarpaşa	Haydarpaşa suburban	Osmangazi towards Gebze
Location

Gebze Teknik Üniversitesi–Fatih station (Turkish: Gebze Teknik Üniversitesi - Fatih istasyonu) is a station on the Marmaray commuter rail line in Gebze, Turkey. The station, along with Çayırova, is situated inside the Gebze Technical University campus. Commuter rail service resumed on 13 March 2019.
