= Derince railway station =

Railway station in Turkey

DERİNCE

General information
- Location: Kanarya Sk., Deniz Mah. 41900; Derince, Kocaeli; Turkey
- Coordinates: 40.7539°N 29.8320°E
- System: TCDD regional rail station
- Owner: Turkish State Railways
- Operator: TCDD Taşımacılık
- Line: Istanbul-Ankara railway
- Platforms: 1 side platform
- Tracks: 3

Construction
- Structure type: At-grade
- Parking: Yes

History
- Opened: 1904
- Closed: 2012-17
- Electrified: 6 February 1977; 25 kV AC, 50 Hz

Services
Preceding station	TCDD Taşımacılık	Following station
Yarımca towards Gebze	Ada Express	İzmit towards Adapazarı
Former services
Preceding station	Turkish State Railways	Following station
Tütünçiftlik towards Istanbul	Adapazarı Express	Koruma towards Adapazarı
Location

Derince railway station (Turkish: Derince istasyonu) is a railway station in Hereke, Turkey. TCDD Taşımacılık operates four daily regional trains between Istanbul and Adapazarı that stop at the station. The station was originally built in 1904 by the Ottoman Anatolian Railway along with the Port of Derince.

Derince station was closed down on 1 February 2012 due to construction of the Ankara-Istanbul high-speed railway. The station was reopened on 4 August 2017.
