= Sakarya Viaduct =

Sakarya Viaduct Sakarya Viyadüğü
- Coordinates: 39.3615°N 31.5807°E
- Carries: 2 tracks of the Ankara-Istanbul high-speed railway
- Crosses: Sakarya River
- Locale: near Polatlı, Ankara Province
- Named for: Sakarya river
- Owner: Turkish State Railways

Characteristics
- Total length: 2,233 m (7,326 ft)
- Height: 16 m (52 ft)

History
- Construction start: 2007
- Construction end: 2008
- Inaugurated: 13 March 2009

Statistics
- Daily traffic: 28 scheduled trains daily

The Sakarya Viaduct (Turkish: Sakarya Viyadüğü) is a 2,233 m (7,326 ft) long railway bridge carrying the Ankara-Istanbul high-speed railway across the Sakarya River and its adjacent plain approximately 15 km (9.3 mi) west of Polatlı, Turkey. The bridge is the fourth longest bridge in Turkey after the Çanakkale 1915 Bridge and Osman Gazi Bridge and the Mount Bolu Viaducts as well as the longest railway bridge in the country.

Construction of the viaduct was started in 2007 and completed in 13 months. The bridge entered revenue service on 13 March 2009, with the opening of the railway from Ankara to Eskişehir.
