= Diliskelesi railway station =

DİLİSKELESİ
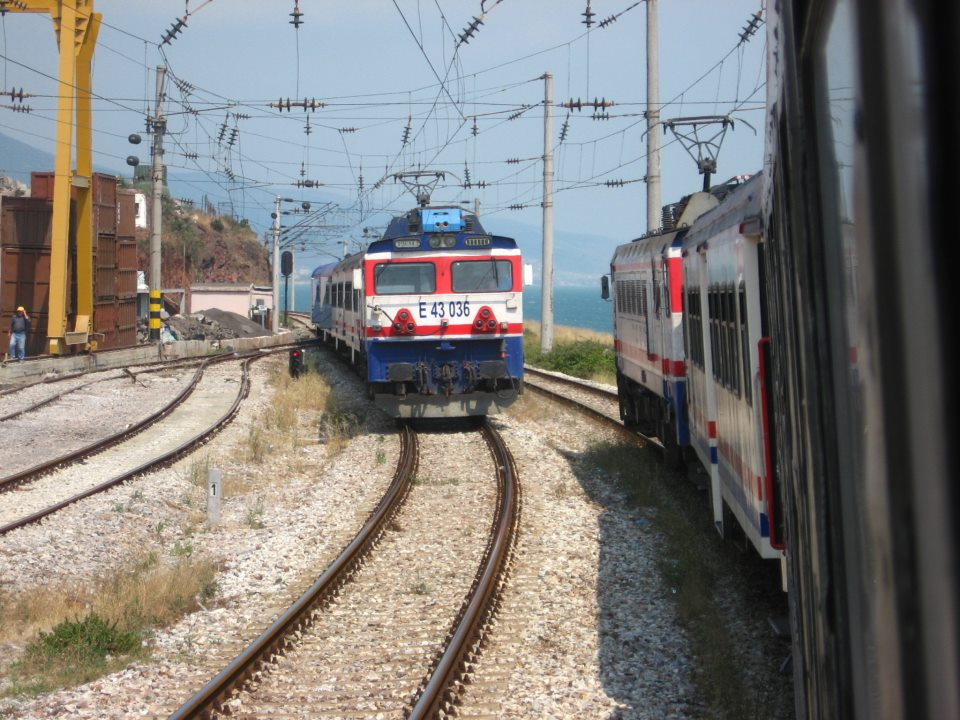
- Two regional trains meet at the station.

General information
- Location: Atatürk Cd., Diliskelesi Mah., 41455; Dilovası, Kocaeli; Turkey
- Coordinates: 40.7697°N 29.5238°E
- Owner: Turkish State Railways
- Platforms: 2 side platforms
- Tracks: 2

Construction
- Structure type: At-grade

History
- Opened: 1975
- Closed: 1 February 2012; 4 August 2017
- Electrified: 6 February 1977; 25 kV AC, 50 Hz Overhead wire
Former services
Preceding station	Turkish State Railways	Following station
Gebze towards Istanbul	Adapazarı Express	Tavşancıl towards Adapazarı
Location

Diliskelesi railway station was a railway station in Diliskelesi, Turkey on the Istanbul-Ankara railway. It was located just southwest of Dilovası, in the southern part of the Diliskelesi in the industrialized port area. The station was a stop on the Adapazarı Express train service; 11 daily eastbound trains and 13 daily westbound trains stopped at Diliskelesi. The station was opened in 1975, when the Turkish State Railways double-tracked the railway from Gebze to Arifiye. Diliskelesi station closed on 1 February 2012 and the platforms were demolished shortly after.
