= Sündiken Mountains =

Mountain range in Turkey

- Sündiken Dağları
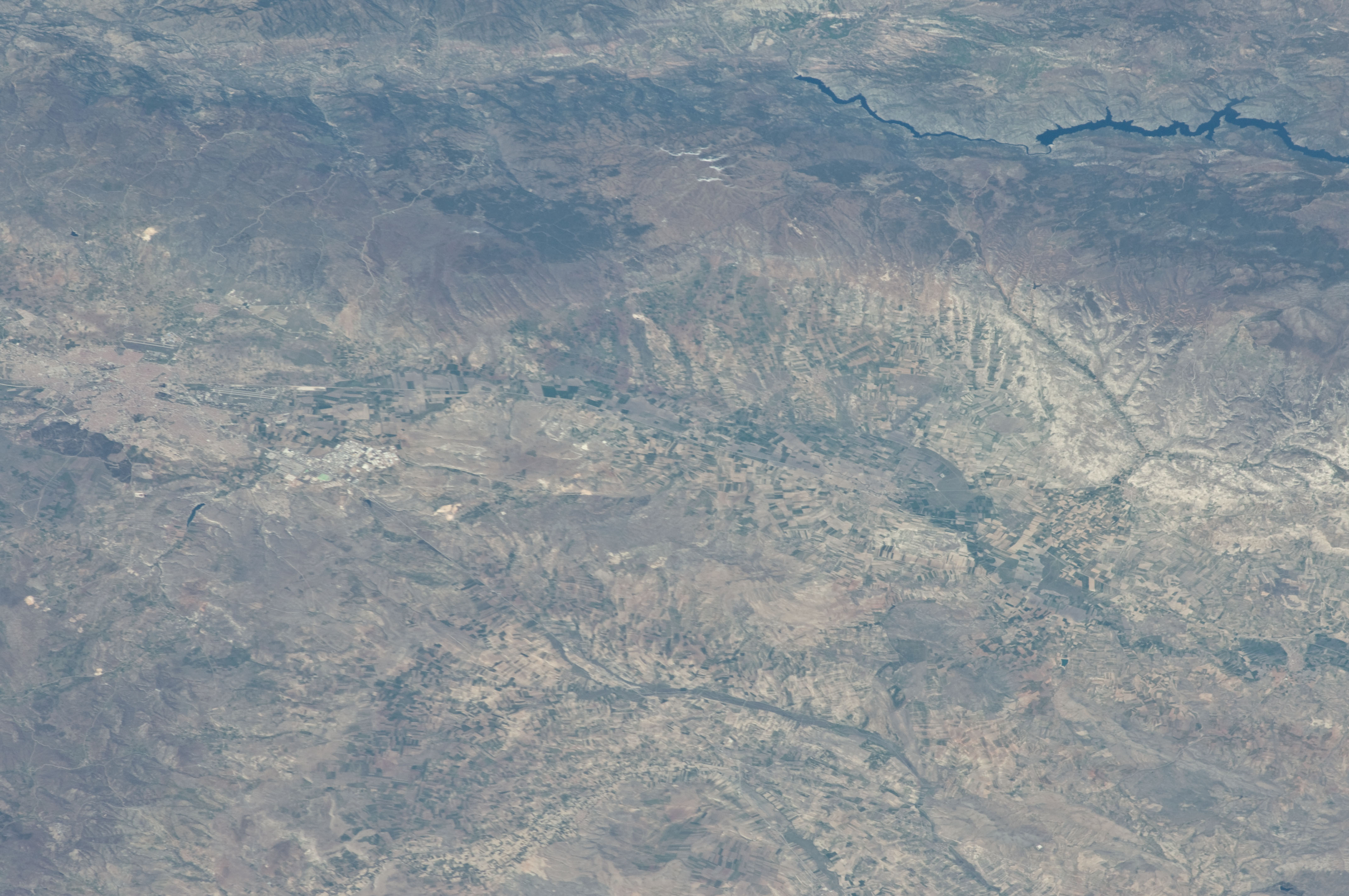
- View of the Sündiken Mountains from the International Space Station. The mountains extend across the upper part of the image, with the city of Eskişehir at center-left and Sarıyar Reservoir at the upper right.

Highest point
- Elevation: 900–1,574 m (2,953–5,164 ft)
- Coordinates: 39.92°N 31.12°E

Dimensions
- Area: 2,125 km^{2} (820 mi^{2})

Geography
- Country: Turkey
- Province: Eskişehir

The Sündiken Mountains (Turkish: Sündiken Dağları) is a mountain range in northwestern Turkey. The range runs east–west, with an area of approximately 2,125 km^{2} in northern Eskişehir Province, south of the Sakarya River, northeast of Eskişehir, and west of Ankara. Elevations range from 900 to 1,574 metres. The mountains have a semi-arid Mediterranean climate, which becomes subhumid and continental at higher elevations.

Approximately 90% of the range is forested, and about 10% is grassland. Pines are the predominant trees, and the species composition varies with elevation. Turkish pine (Pinus brutia), interspersed with maquis, grows at drier low elevations in the Sakarya valley. Oak-juniper-black pine forest grows at middle elevations, with black pine (Pinus nigra) predominant, mixed with Quercus pubescens and other oaks (Quercus spp.) on the southern slopes of the mountains. Scots pine (Pinus sylvestris) is predominant in the subhumid, cold, continental climate above 1200 meters elevation, forming pure stands or mixed with P. nigra subsp. pallasiana in transitional areas, and covering approximately 5000 hectares. There are extensive areas of anthropogenic steppe in the mountains, formed by clear-cutting forests for timber, agriculture, or pasture. The mountains' flora is diverse and includes Euro-Siberian, Iranian-Turanian, and Mediterranean species, with Euro-Siberian species predominant at higher elevations, Mediterranean species in the Sakarya valley to the north, and Iranian-Turanian species in the steppe transition to the south and east.

The range is an important breeding area for raptors, including the eastern imperial eagle (Aquila heliaca), bearded vulture (Gypaetus barbatus), booted eagle (Hieraaetus pennatus), cinereous vulture (Aegypius monachus), and Egyptian vulture (Neophron percnopterus).

Approximately half the range is used for commercial forestry, and about 10% for livestock farming and ranching. The Eskişehir-Mihaliccik Çatacık Wildlife Development Area is a protected area which covers a portion of the range.
