= Yarımca railway station =

YARIMCA
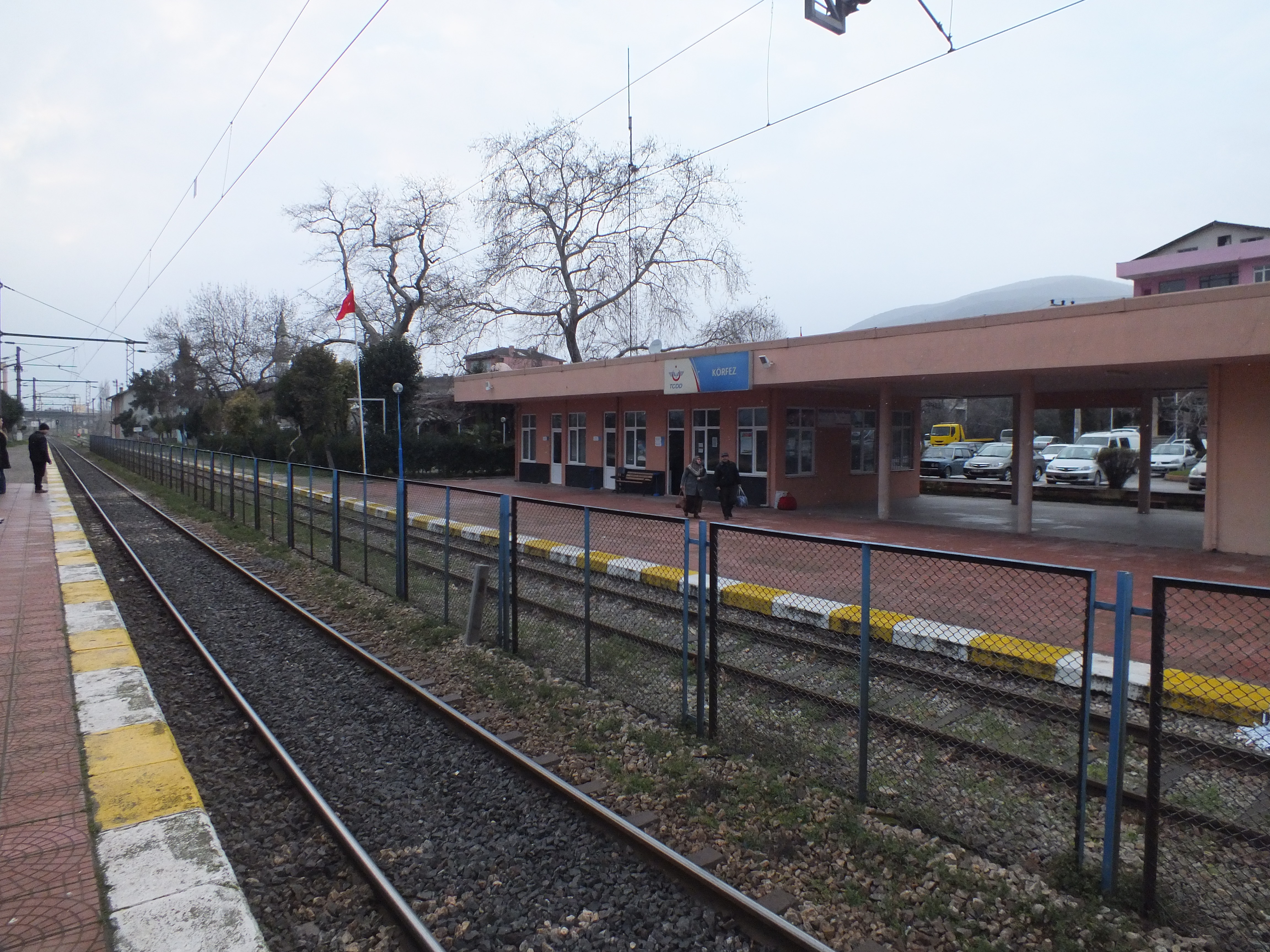
- "Körfez" station in 2012 before reconstruction and renaming.

General information
- Location: İstasyon Cd, Atalar, Körfez, Kocaeli Province; Turkey
- Coordinates: 40.462211°N 29.434820°E
- Owner: Turkish State Railways
- Line: Istanbul-Ankara railway
- Platforms: 1 side platform
- Tracks: 4

Construction
- Parking: Yes

History
- Opened: August 1873
- Rebuilt: 1969, 2012-16
- Electrified: 25 kV AC overhead wire

Services
Preceding station	TCDD Taşımacılık	Following station
Hereke towards Gebze	Ada Express	Derince towards Adapazarı
Former services
Preceding station	Turkish State Railways	Following station
Hereke towards Arifiye	Boğaziçi Express	Derince towards Ankara
Kirazlıyalı towards Istanbul	Adapazarı Express	Seramik towards Adapazarı
Location

Yarımca station (Turkish: Yarımca garı) is railway station located in Körfez, Turkey. Situated on the northern shore of the Gulf of İzmit, it is one of the three operating stations between Gebze and İzmit, the other two being Hereke and Derince. The station is currently served by the Ada Express, which consists of four round trips between Pendik, Istanbul and Mithatpaşa, Adapazarı.

Yarımca station was originally named Körfez until 2012, when the station underwent a complete overhaul. During the reconstruction, the station was reduced from 2 platforms servicing 3 tracks, to 1 platform servicing 1 track. The name was changed to Yarımca and service was greatly reduced. Before 2012, Yarımca was serviced by the famous Haydarpaşa-Adapazarı Regional as well as several other mainline trains.

Yarımca station was originally built by the Ottoman Government in 1873 as part of their line from Istanbul to İzmit.

== Connections ==
- Kocaeli Bus Service
