= State road D.650 (Turkey) =

Road in Turkey

D.650

Route information
- Length: 641 km (398 mi)

Major junctions
- North end: Karasu (Black Sea coast)
- South end: Antalya (Mediterranean Sea coast]

Location
- Country: Turkey

Highway system
- Highways in Turkey; Motorways; List; State Highways; List

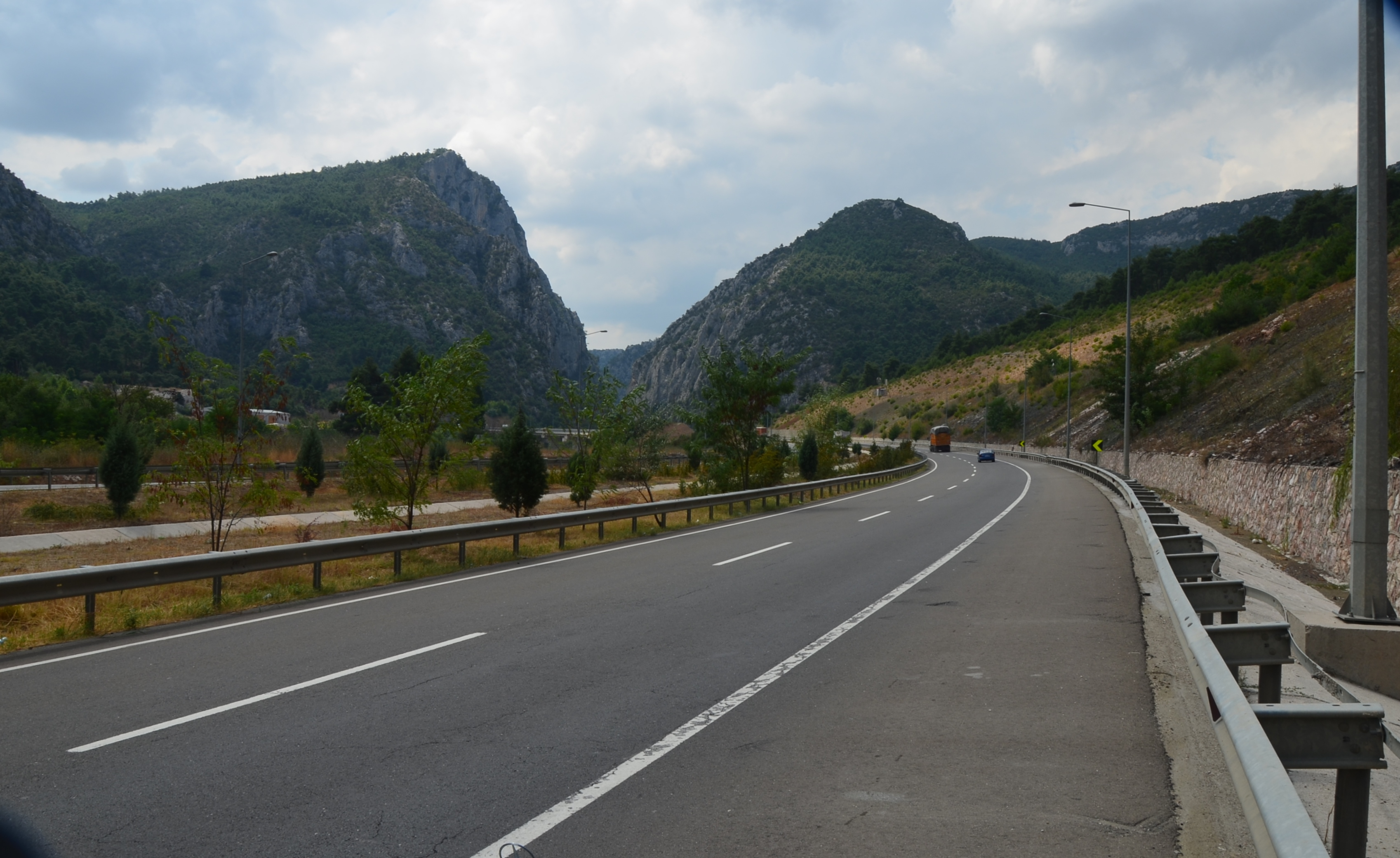
State road D-650 southbound in Bilecik Province.

D.650 is a north-to-south state road in Turkey. It starts at Karasu at the Black Sea coast and ends at Antalya at the Mediterranean Sea coast. Since it runs across Turkey from north to south, it crosses many state roads, including the D.100, D.200, and D.300.

== Itinerary ==
Province	Location	Distance from Karasu (km)	Distance from Karasu (mile)	Distance from Antalya (km)	Distance from Antalya (mile)
Sakarya
Sakarya	Karasu	0	0	641	398
Sakarya	Adapazarı	53	33	588	365
Bilecik
Bilecik	Bilecik	159	99	482	299
Bilecik	Bozüyük	190	118	451	280
Kütahya	Kütahya	270	168	371	231
Afyon
Afyon	Junction 1	363	226	278	173
Afyon	Junction 2	370	230	271	168
Afyon	Sandıklı	416	258	225	140
Burdur
Burdur	Burdur	516	321	125	78
Burdur	Bucak	560	348	81	50
Antalya	Antalya	641	398	0	0

== See also ==
- Osmangazi Tunnel
