= Vezirhan =

- Municipality
- Location within Turkey Location within Marmara
- Coordinates: 40°15′N 30°01′E
- Country: Turkey
- Province: Bilecik
- District: Bilecik
- Elevation: 160 m (520 ft)
- Population (2021): 2,907
- Time zone: UTC+3 (TRT)
- Postal code: 11130
- Area code: 0228

Vezirhan is a town (belde) and municipality in the Bilecik District, Bilecik Province, Turkey. Its population is 2,907 (2021). The name of the town refers to a caravansarai in the town.

== Geography ==
Vezirhan is situated 15 kilometres (9 mi) north east of Bilecik.

== History ==
The town is very near to Söğüt where the Ottoman Empire was founded, but earliest reliable documents about the town go back to the 17th century. According to these documents, the settlement was a part of Köprülü Mehmet Pasha’s (an Ottoman Grand Vizier) possessions in 1661. The Pasha commissioned a complex in the town (Turkish: külliye) which constituted a caravansarai, a mosque, a hamam (bathhouse), a drinking water well and a bridge over the river. These were dedicated to travellers from Istanbul to Central Anatolia. There was also a church, a sign of Greek presence. But during the compulsory population exchange between Greece and Turkey (Turkish: mübadele) in 1920s, they left the town.

== Economy ==
The main economic activities are agriculture and animal husbandry. But there are also some factories around the town such as paper, ceramics and moulding.
