= Terminal railway station =

TERMİNAL
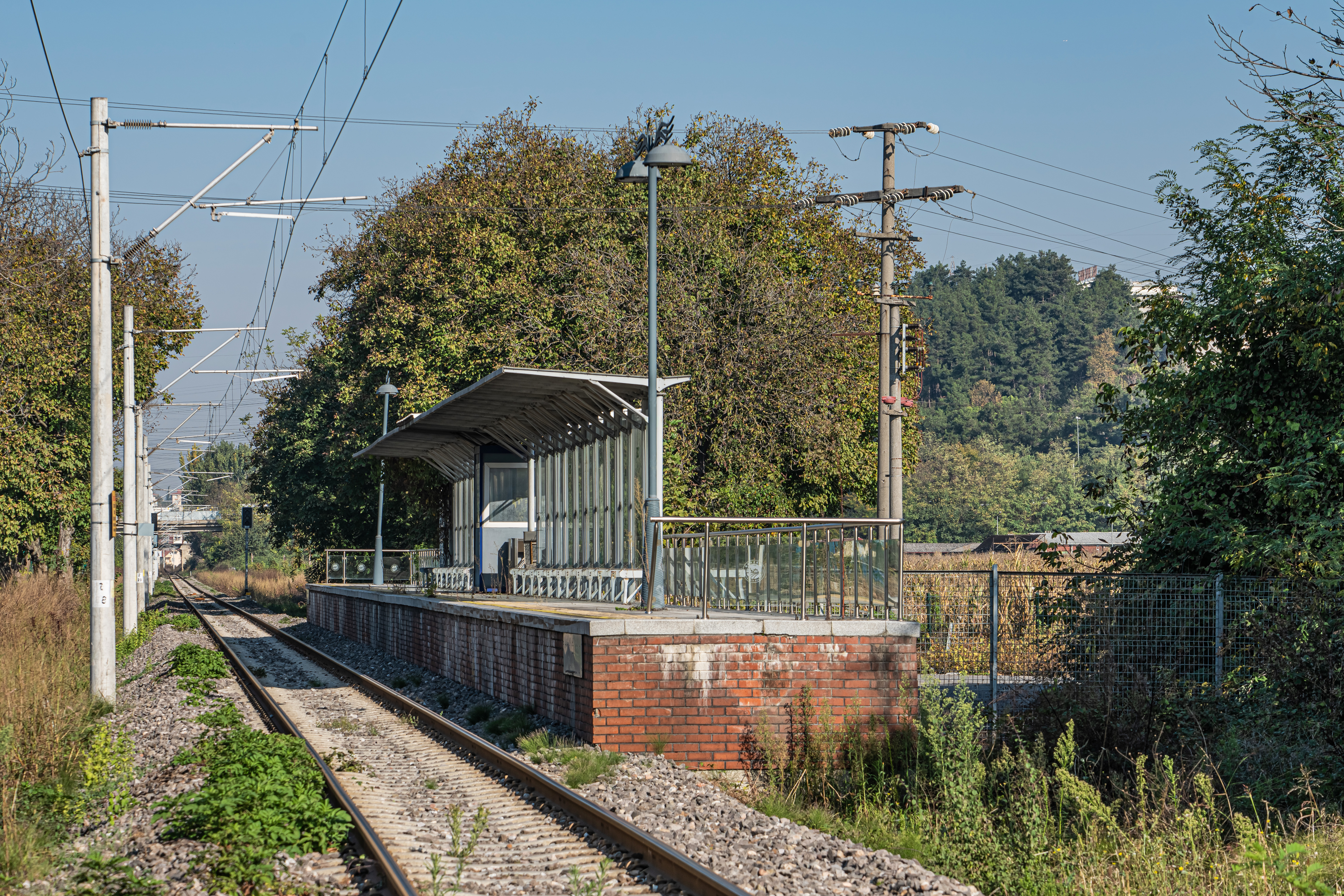

General information
- Location: Atatürk Cd., Arifbey Mah., Arifiye 54580
- Coordinates: 40°43′48″N 30°22′34″E
- System: Adaray commuter rail station
- Owner: Adaray
- Line: Adaray
- Platforms: 1 side platform
- Tracks: 1
- Connections: SAKUS Bus: 3, 7, 28, 29

Construction
- Structure type: At-Grade
- Parking: No
- Accessible: Yes

History
- Opened: 28 May 2013 (first time); 29 October 2024 (second time)
- Closed: 12 December 2016
Services
Preceding station	ADA	Following station
Bahçelievler towards Arifiye	Adaray	32 Evler towards Adapazarı
Location

Terminal station is a station in Arifiye, Turkey. It is serviced by Adaray commuter trains operating between Arifiye and Adapazarı. Terminal station was opened on 28 May 2013 along with the opening of the Adaray line and is one of four new stations built on the 8.4 km (5.2 mi) railway to Adapazarı. The new Adapazarı Bus Terminal is located adjacent to the station.

Adaray service was suspended on 12 December 2016, only resuming on 29 October 2024.
