= Adaray =

Commuter rail service in Sakarya, Turkey

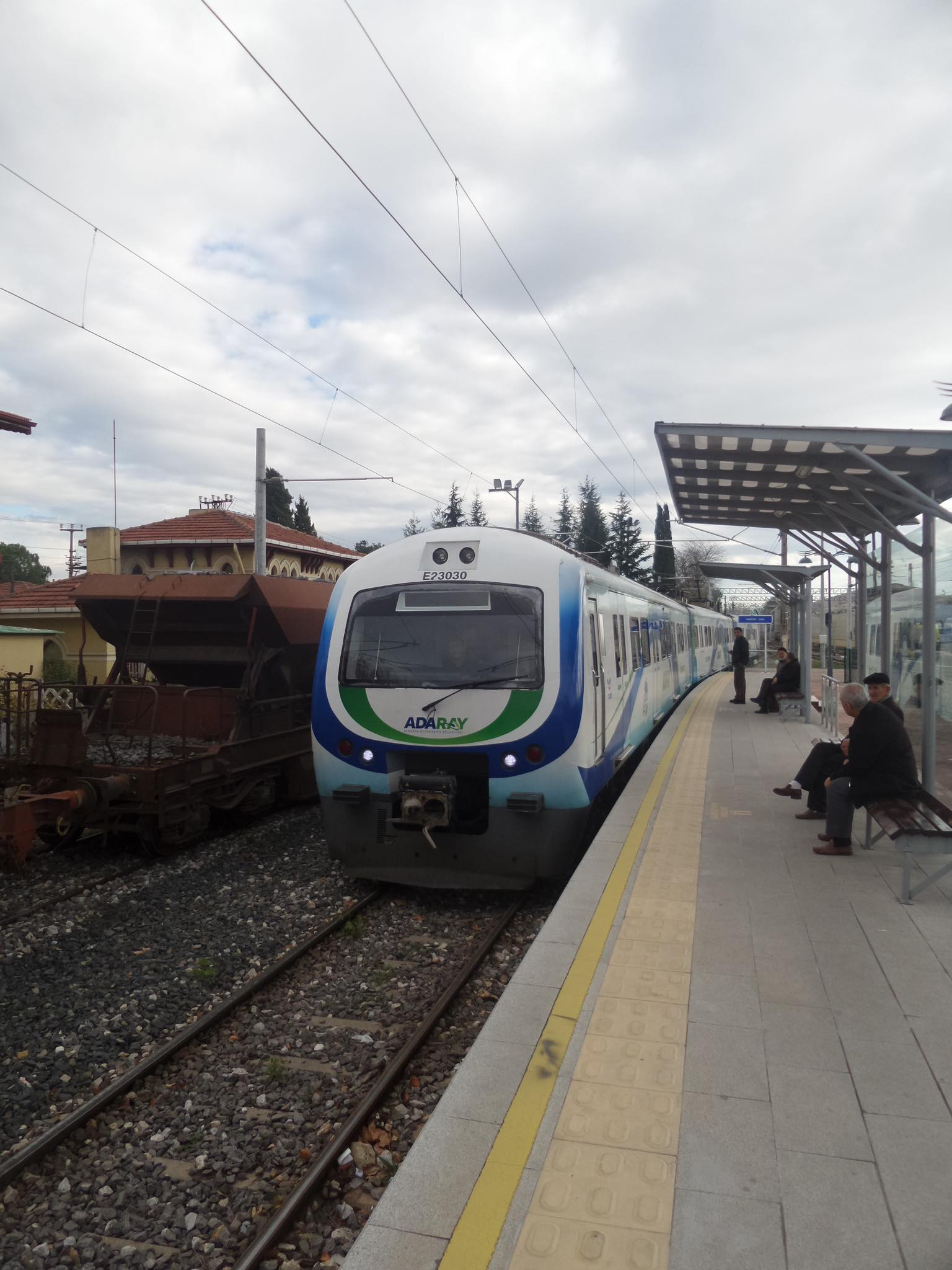
- TCDD E23000 at the Mithatpaşa station

Overview
- Owner: Sakarya Metropolitan Municipality
- Area served: Adapazarı Metropolitan Area
- Transit type: Commuter rail
- Number of stations: 7
- Headquarters: Adapazarı, Turkey
- Website: Adaray

Operation
- Began operation: 28 May 2013 (first time); 29 Oct 2024 (second time)
- Ended operation: 12 December 2016
- Reporting marks: ADA
- Infrastructure manager: Turkish State Railways
- Number of vehicles: TCDD E23000 EMUs
- Train length: 3 cars (1 EMU)
- Headway: 15 minutes

Technical
- System length: 8.4 km (5.2 mi)
- No. of tracks: 1
- Track gauge: 1,435 mm (4 ft 8 1/2 in) standard gauge

Adaray is a short-line commuter rail service operating between Adapazarı and Arifiye in Sakarya, Turkey. Commuter service on the line was introduced in 2013 in order to compensate for the discontinuation of the popular Haydarpaşa-Adapazarı Regional. Along with the three existing stations on the 8.4 km (5.2 mi) line (Adapazarı, Mithatpaşa and Arifiye), four new small stations, consisting of a single island platform, were added.

When regional train service to Istanbul was restored on 5 January 2015, via the Ada Express, Adaray served as a connection between the train's final stop in Arifiye to the city center of Adapazarı. Finally in 2016 the service was cancelled. On 29 October 2024 service restarted.

== Stations list ==
District	Neighborhood	Station	Connections
Adapazarı	Semerciler	Adapazarı	SAKUS Bus: 2, 3, 4, 5, 6, 7, 9A, 9B, 14, 19K, 20, 20A, 21A, 21B, 22A, 26, 28, 54
Adapazarı	Yenidoğan	Aziz Duran Parkı	SAKUS Bus: 2, 5, 6, 9A, 9B, 14, 19, 21A, 22A, 24H, 28, 29, 54
Adapazarı	Mithatpaşa	Mithatpaşa	TCDD Taşımacılık: Ada Express; SAKUS Bus: 14
Adapazarı	Otuziki Evler	32 Evler	SAKUS Bus: 9A, 9B
Arifiye	Arifbey	Terminal	SAKUS Bus: 28, 29, 54
Arifiye	Arifbey	Bahçelievler	
Arifiye	Arifbey	Arifiye	TCDD Taşımacılık: Yüksek Hızlı Tren, Ada Express
