= 32 Evler railway station =

Railway station in Adapazarı, Turkey

32 EVLER
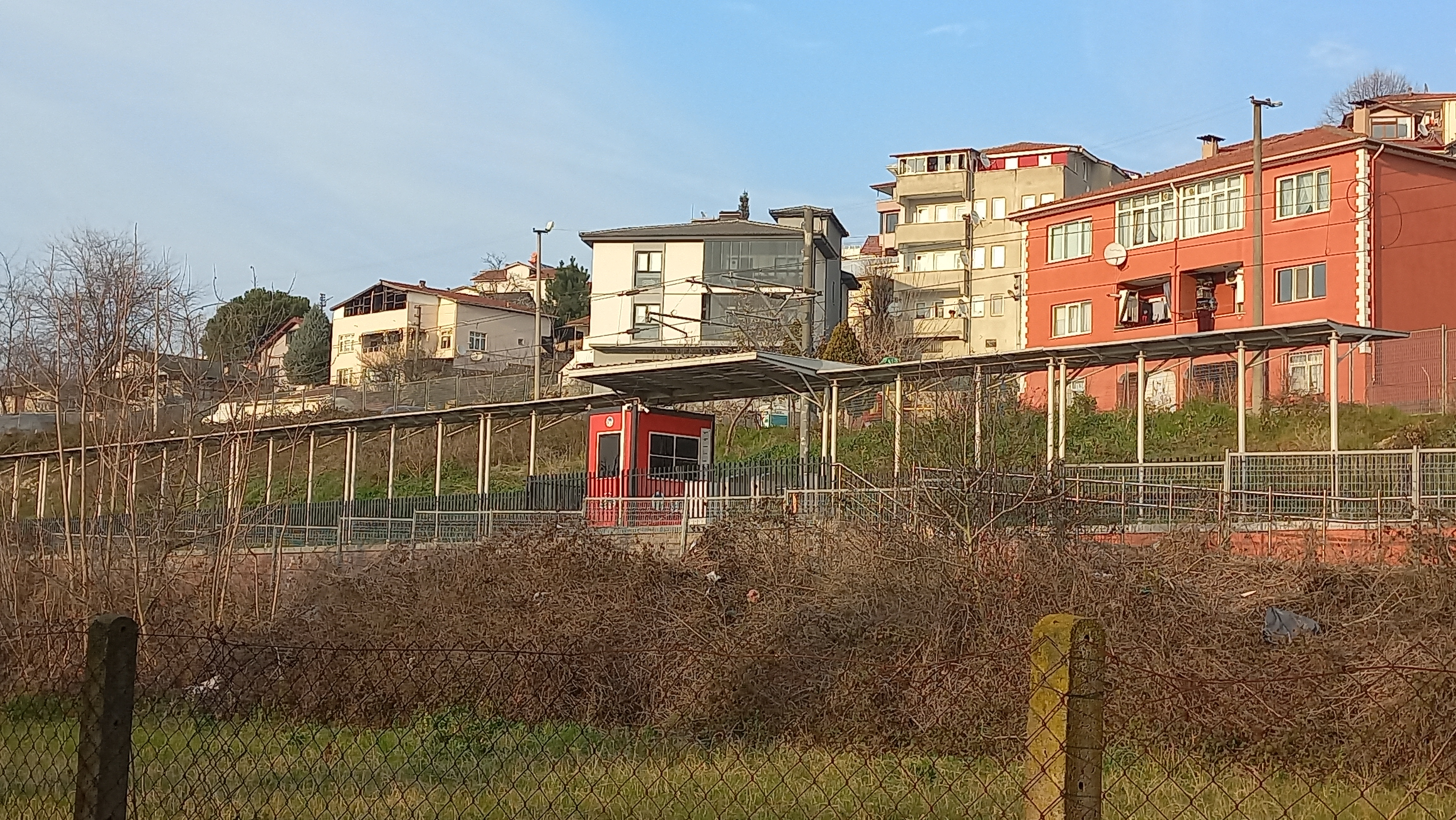

General information
- Location: Sakarya Cd. 32, Otuzikievler Mah., Adapazarı 54100
- Coordinates: 40°45′01″N 30°22′36″E
- System: Adaray commuter rail station
- Owner: Adaray
- Line: Adaray
- Platforms: 1 side platform
- Tracks: 1
- Connections: SAKUS Bus: 9A, 9B

Construction
- Structure type: At-Grade
- Parking: No
- Accessible: Yes

History
- Opened: 28 May 2013
- Closed: 12 December 2016
Services
| Preceding station | ADA | Following station |
|---|---|---|
| Terminal towards Arifiye | Adaray | Mithatpaşa towards Adapazarı |
Location

32 Evler station (Turkish: 32 Evler istasyonu) is a station in Adapazarı, Turkey. It is serviced by Adaray commuter trains operating between Arifiye and Adapazarı. 32 Evler station was opened on 28 May 2013, along with the opening of the Adaray line and is one of four new stations built on the 8.4 km (5.2 mi) railway to Adapazarı. Adaray service was indefinitely suspended as of 12 December 2016 and restarted on 29 October 2024.
