= Sapanca railway station =

SAPANCA

General information
- Location: Kuvayi Milliye Cd., Rüştem Paşa Mah., Sapanca, Turkey 54600
- Coordinates: 40.6929°N 30.2735°E
- System: TCDD regional rail station
- Owner: Turkish State Railways
- Lines: Istanbul-Ankara railway Ankara-Istanbul high-speed railway
- Platforms: 2
- Tracks: 4

Construction
- Structure type: At-Grade
- Parking: Yes
- Accessible: Yes

History
- Opened: 1 September 1891
- Rebuilt: 1976-77, 2012-14
- Electrified: 1977

Services
| Preceding station | TCDD Taşımacılık | Following station |
|---|---|---|
| Büyükderbent towards Gebze | Ada Express | Arifiye towards Adapazarı |
Former services
| Preceding station | Turkish State Railways | Following station |
|---|---|---|
| İzmit towards Arifiye | Boğaziçi Express | Arifiye towards Ankara |
| Kırkpınar towards Istanbul | Adapazarı Express | Uzunkum towards Adapazarı |
Location

Sapanca station is a railway station along the Istanbul-Ankara railway in the town of Sapanca, Turkey. It is serviced by the Istanbul-Arifiye limited-stop regional train, the Ada Express. Until 2012, Sapanca was a stop on the Haydarpaşa-Adapazarı Regional, which operated frequently. Other express trains heading for Ankara and points beyond would skip the station. Today, the high-speed Yüksek Hızlı Tren service passes the station on its own right of way. Sapanca is 123 km (76 mi) away from Haydarpaşa Terminal in Istanbul.
