= Bahçelievler railway station =

BAHÇELİEVLER

General information
- Location: Menekşe Sk., Arifbey Mah., Arifiye 54580
- Coordinates: 40°43′05″N 30°22′03″E
- System: Adaray commuter rail station
- Owner: Adaray
- Line: Adaray
- Platforms: 1 side platform
- Tracks: 1

Construction
- Structure type: At-Grade
- Parking: No
- Accessible: Yes

History
- Opened: 28 May 2013; 29 October 2024
- Closed: 12 December 2016
Services
Preceding station	ADA	Following station
Arifiye Terminus	Adaray	Terminal towards Adapazarı
Location

Bahçelievler station is a station in Arifiye, Turkey. It is serviced by Adaray commuter trains operating between Arifiye and Adapazarı. Bahçelievler station was opened on 28 May 2013 along with the opening of the Adaray line and is one of four new stations built on the 8.4 km (5.2 mi) railway to Adapazarı.

Adaray service was suspended on 12 December 2016. Service resumed on 29 October 2024.
