= Kentparkı railway station =

Railway station in Sakarya, Turkey

KENTPARKI
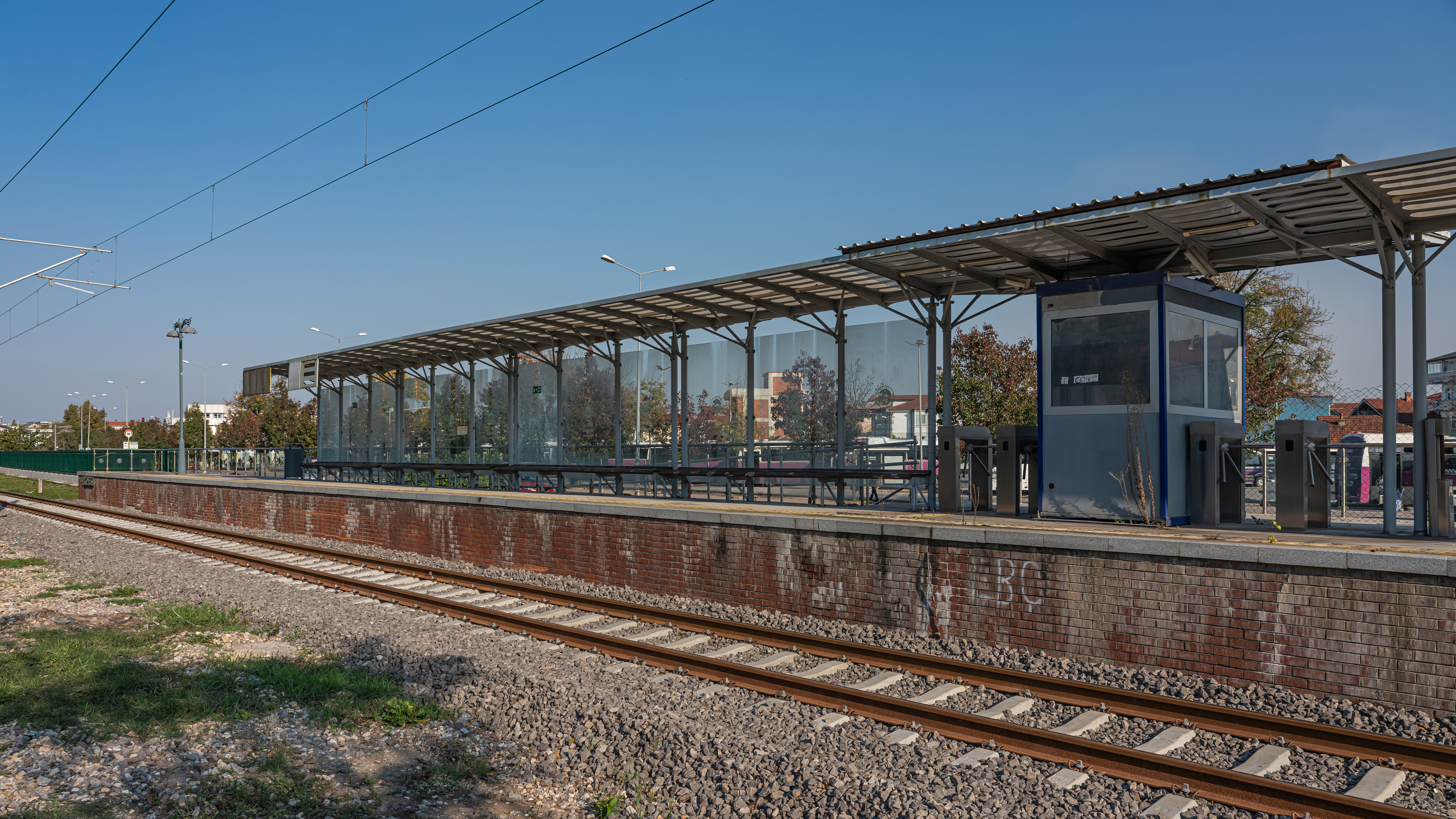

General information
- Location: Milli Egemenlik Cd., Mithatpaşa Mah., Adapazarı 54100
- Coordinates: 40°46′15″N 30°23′27″E
- System: Adaray commuter rail station
- Owner: Adaray
- Line: Adaray
- Platforms: 1 side platform
- Tracks: 1
- Connections: SAKUS Bus: 2, 5, 6, 9A, 9B, 14, 19, 21A, 22A, 24H, 28, 29, 54

Construction
- Structure type: At-Grade
- Parking: No
- Accessible: Yes

History
- Opened: 28 May 2013 (first time); 29 Oct 2024 (second time)
- Closed: 12 December 2016
Services
Preceding station	ADA	Following station
Mithatpaşa towards Arifiye	Adaray	Adapazarı Terminus
Location

Kentparkı station (Turkish: Kentparkı istasyonu) is a station in Adapazarı, Turkey. It is serviced by Adaray commuter trains operating between Arifiye and Adapazarı. The station was opened on 28 May 2013 along with the opening of the Adaray line and is one of four new stations built on the 8.4 km (5.2 mi) railway to Adapazarı. Adaray service was suspended on 12 December 2016 and resumed on 29 October 2024, with the station changing its name to Aziz Duran Parkı.
