= Mithatpaşa railway station =

Railway station in Sakarya, Turkey

Mithatpaşa
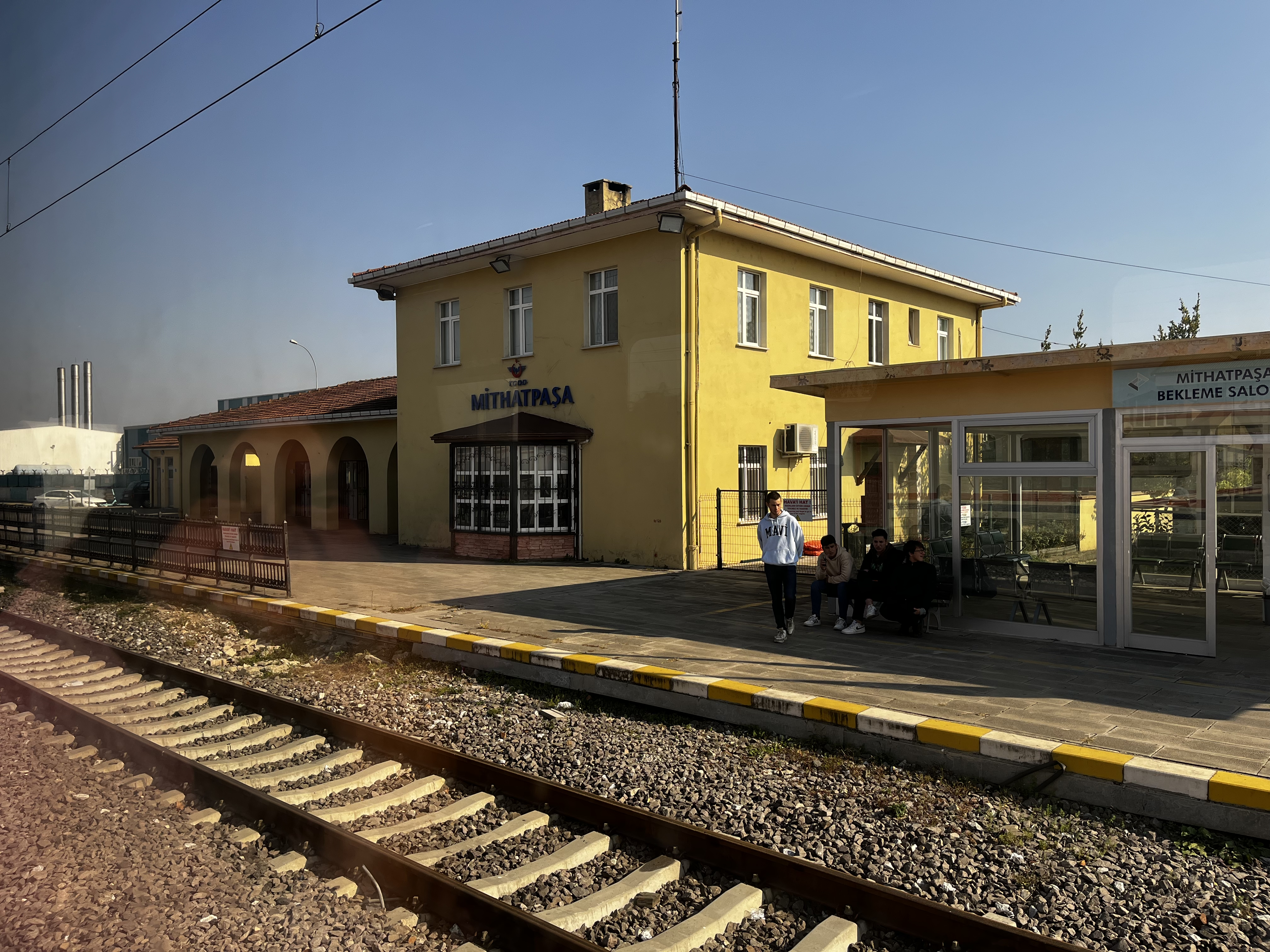
- Mithatpaşa railway station

General information
- Location: Milli Egemenlik Cd., Mithatpaşa Mahallesi, Adapazarı 54100; Adapazarı, Sakarya; Turkey
- Coordinates: 40°45′32″N 30°22′48″E
- System: TCDD regional rail station
- Owner: Turkish State Railways
- Operator: TCDD Taşımacılık
- Lines: TCDD Taımacılık: Ada Express; S.B.B.: Adaray
- Platforms: 2 (1 island platform, 1 side platform
- Tracks: 3
- Connections: SAKUS Bus: 14

Construction
- Parking: Yes

History
- Opened: 1 November 1899

Services
| Preceding station | TCDD Taşımacılık | Following station |
|---|---|---|
| Arifiye towards Istanbul | Adapazarı Express | Adapazarı Terminus |
| Preceding station | ADA | Following station |
| 32 Evler towards Arifiye | Adaray | Kentparkı towards Adapazarı |
Former services
| Preceding station | Turkish State Railways | Following station |
|---|---|---|
| Arifiye towards Gebze | Ada Express | Adapazarı Terminus |
Location

Mithatpaşa station is a railway station in Adapazarı, Turkey. It is serviced by the Ada Express to Istanbul and Adaray commuter trains to Adapazarı and Arifiye. The station also serves the TÜVASAŞ railcar manufacturing factory located adjacent to it. Mithatpaşa was opened on 1 November 1899 by the Ottoman Anatolian Railway and later taken over by the Turkish State Railways.
