= TCDD TVS2000 =

Railcars on Turkish railways

TÜVASAŞ 2000
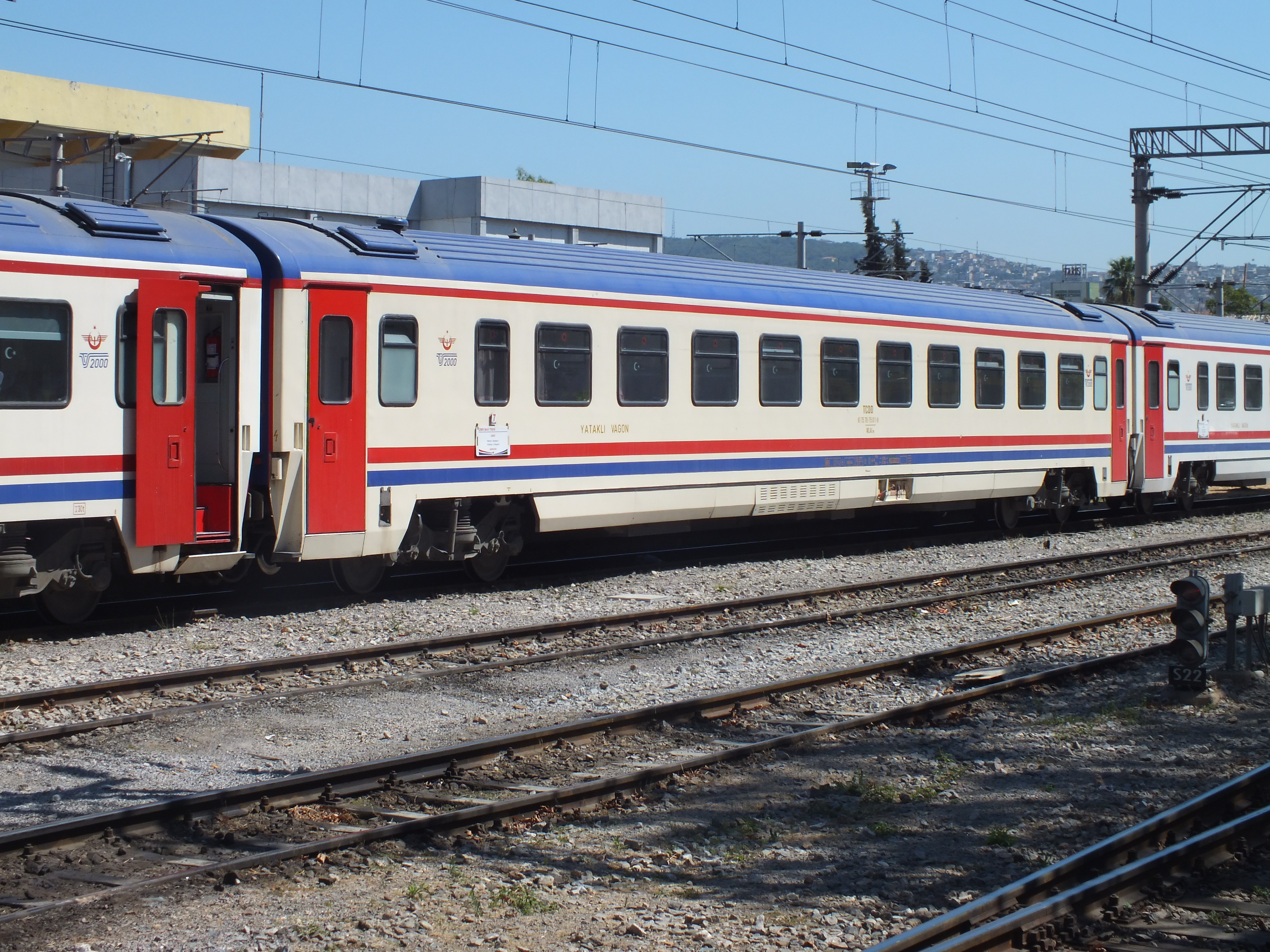
- TVS2000 cars at Alsancak station.
- In service: 1993–present
- Manufacturers: TÜVASAŞ (Past), TÜRASAŞ (Present)
- Built at: Adapazarı Plant
- Constructed: 1993–2005
- Entered service: 1993–present
- Number built: 321
- Formation: various types of individual cars to be coupled together to form a passenger train
- Capacity: 60 (Coach car); 40 (couchette car); 20 (sleeping car); 12 (conference car)
- Operator: TCDD Taşımacılık
- Depots: Marşandiz Yard, Halkalı Yard, Mithatpaşa Yard, Alsancak Yard
- Line served: All TCDD lines where trains are locomotive-pulled

Specifications
- Car body construction: Welded steel
- Car length: 26.4 m (86 ft 7 in)
- Width: 2.825 m (9 ft 3.2 in)
- Height: 4.05 m (13 ft 3 in)
- Floor height: 1.25 m (4 ft 1 in)
- Platform height: 480 millimetres (19 in) preferred
- Entry: step entry, with a possibility of level entry from a high platform
- Doors: Swing plug with electro-pneumatic controls
- Maximum speed: 160 km/h (99 mph)
- Weight: 48 tons minimum
- Axle load: 65 tons maximum
- Power supply: external (1,000 V, 800 A)
- HVAC: yes
- Bogies: Y32
- Coupling system: Screw and buffer coupling
- Track gauge: 1,435 mm (4 ft 8 1/2 in)

The TÜVASAŞ 2000, more commonly known as TVS2000, is a series of intercity railcars built by TÜVASAŞ for the Turkish State Railways between 1993 and 2005. They were built in order to revive TCDD's failing image in the early 1990s, for use on the Capital Express. Today they are the most common railcars in Turkey.

== History ==
TCDD's image was failing greatly in the early 1990s and its Ankara−Istanbul mainline was losing market-share to roads. People mostly chose buses over rail for travel, because TCDD's fleet of railcars were aging quickly. The railways' premier train at the time, the Fatih Express was using Black-Red Intercity cars, which were noisy, uncomfortable and without air conditioning which made the interior very hot during the summer times. During winter times, the steam heater on board the cars always broke down or malfunctioned causing problems. To make things even worse, a highway was opened between Istanbul and Ankara decreasing travel by car and bus considerably. The railways needed to improve travel or they would lose a lot more customers to roads.

The solution was the operation of a brand new train between the two cities: The Capital Express. For this train brand new, luxurious railcars would be needed so, TCDD ordered a batch of new TVS2000 railcars from TÜVASAŞ in 1991. The TVS2000s proved to be successful very quickly. TCDD's bad image started to improve almost instantly and the Istanbul–Ankara main line was getting increased travel. Because of the success of the railcars, TCDD ordered even more of them and soon started to replace their entire fleet with them.

TÜVASAŞ has modernized intercity and regional cars to meet TVS2000 standards between 2002 and 2006.

== Types ==
The TVS2000 series has coach cars, couchette cars, sleeping cars and dining cars.

=== Coach (Pullman) car ===
The Coach car, known as "Pullman cars" in Turkey, (Turkish: Pulman vagon) were the first batch of railcars to be built and put into service. A total of 176 were built with the first batch entering revenue service in 1993. Coaches have 2+1 seating arrangements with restrooms at either end. Sliding elector-pnuematic doors separate the main compartment from the vestibules. A standard coach car has a capacity of 60 seated passengers.

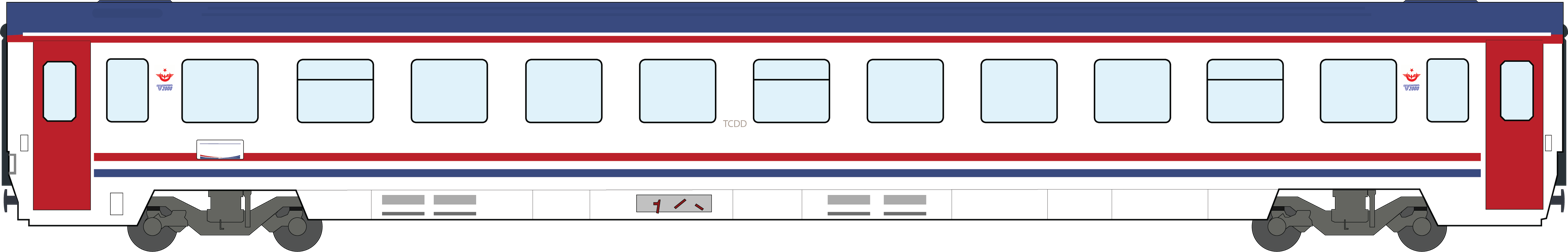
Pullman (Coach) car

=== Dining car ===
The Dining car (Turkish: Yemekli vagon) was the second type of TVS2000 railcar to be built. A total of 28 were built with the first batch entering service in 1994. Dining cars have 12 tables (6 on either side) seating 4 passengers. Prior to the 2008 smoking ban, dining cars had a smoking and non-smoking area, with a glass partition between the two. The smoking area was towards the middle of the car, consisting of 8 tables, while the smaller non-smoking area was towards the rear of the car with 4 tables.

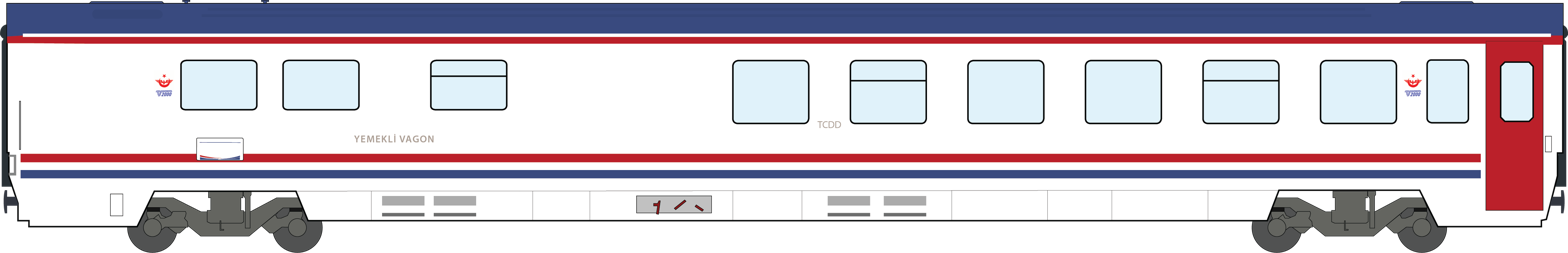
Dining car

=== Couchette car ===
The Couchette car (Turkish: Kuşetli vagon) was introduced in 1996 with a total of 20 cars built. These cars featured 10 compartments, each having 4 seats. Baggage racks were included above both pairs of seats. In 2002, 30 new couchette cars were built that featured sleeping accommodations for overnight trains. The same 4-seat compartments were included on this newer set, with 4 folding beds. 2 beds would fold out from the seats, while the other two beds would fold down from above. The baggage rack was removed on this model. To distinguish the two cars, the non-sleeping couchette cars became known as Compartment cars (Turkish: Kompartmanlı vagon), while the sleeping couchette cars kept the name of Couchette cars.

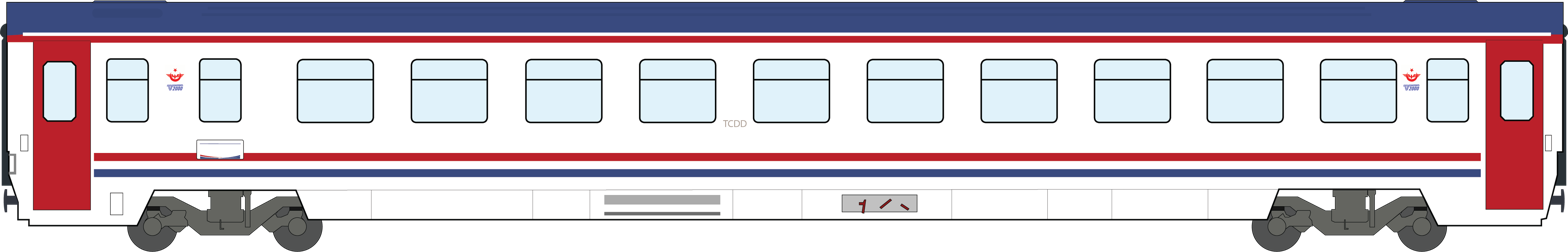
Couchette car

=== Sleeping car ===
The Sleeping car (Turkish: Yataklı vagon) was introduced in 1998 with a total of 67 cars built. Each car has 10 compartments, each with a bunk bed housing 2 passengers. In TCDD's ticketing practice, these compartments can not be shared with passengers that book separately. Inside each compartment is a small sink with a mirror, a counter with a minifridge and cabinet as well as an overhead baggage rack. Toilets are located at both ends of the car.

A number of such sleeping cars were made for the Bulgarian Railways in the early 2010s, to replace some of the older sleepers made by VEB Waggonbau Bautzen/Görlitz in East Germany in the 1970s and 1980s. They are used on overnight domestic trains and some international services.

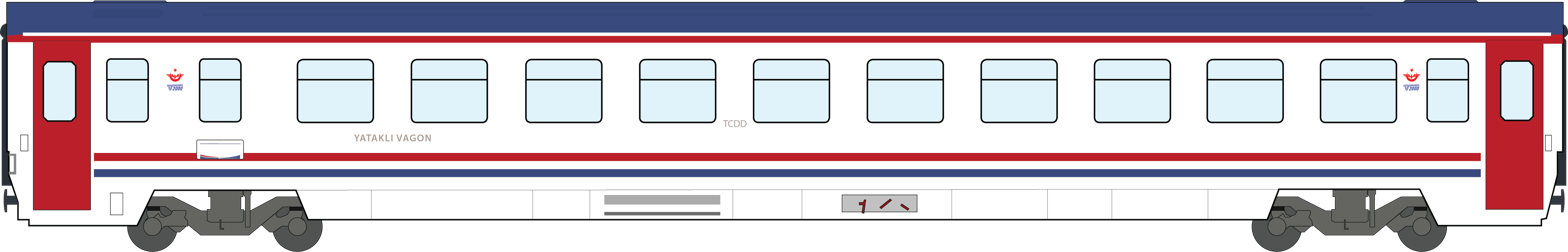
Sleeping car

=== Generator car ===
Generator cars (Turkish: Jeneratör vagon) were introduced in 2005 to provide Head-end power to the rest of the train, since most Turkish locomotives do not supply HEP. These cars also provide a small quarters for the crew. A total of 88 were built. Variants with different underlying diesel engines exist.

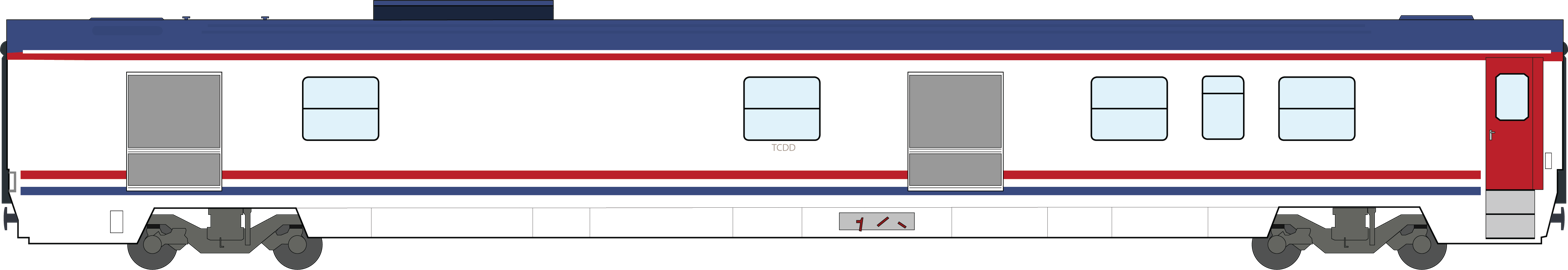
Generator (HEP) car (type: D + JENERATÖR)

== Usage ==
The first train to be equipped with the TVS2000 Capital Express, running between Istanbul and Ankara. After 1998 most overnight trains were equipped with them. Today most intercity trains are equipped with the TVS2000s.
