= Arifiye–Adapazarı railway =

Railway in Turkey

The Adapazarı branch is a short, 3.2 km (2.0 mi) railway branch line off the Istanbul–Ankara main line. The line was opened in 1899 by the Chemins de Fer Ottomans d'Anatolie, and runs from Arifiye to Adapazarı. An extension to Bolu and Ankara was planned but never constructed.
