= Serdivan =

- District and municipality
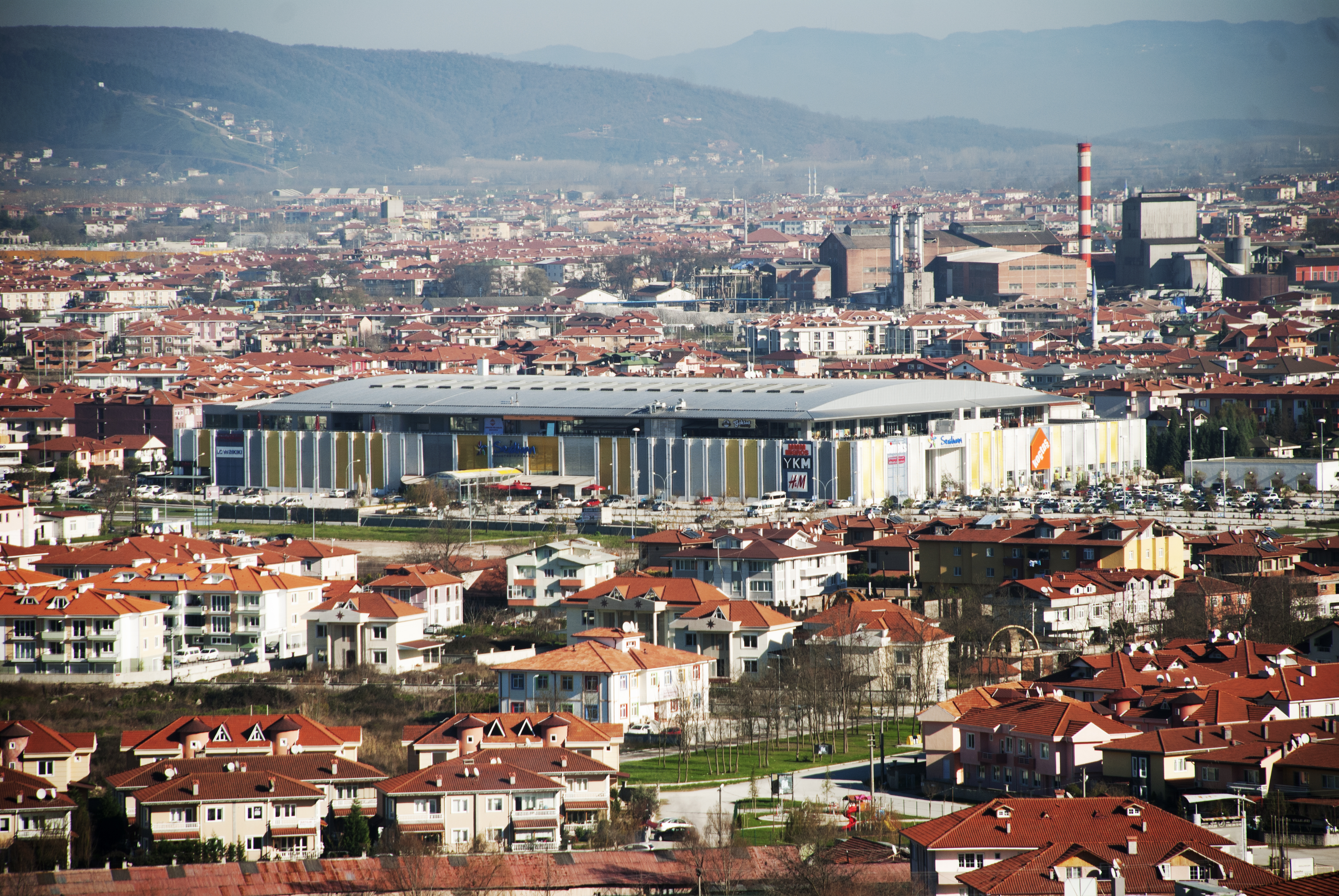

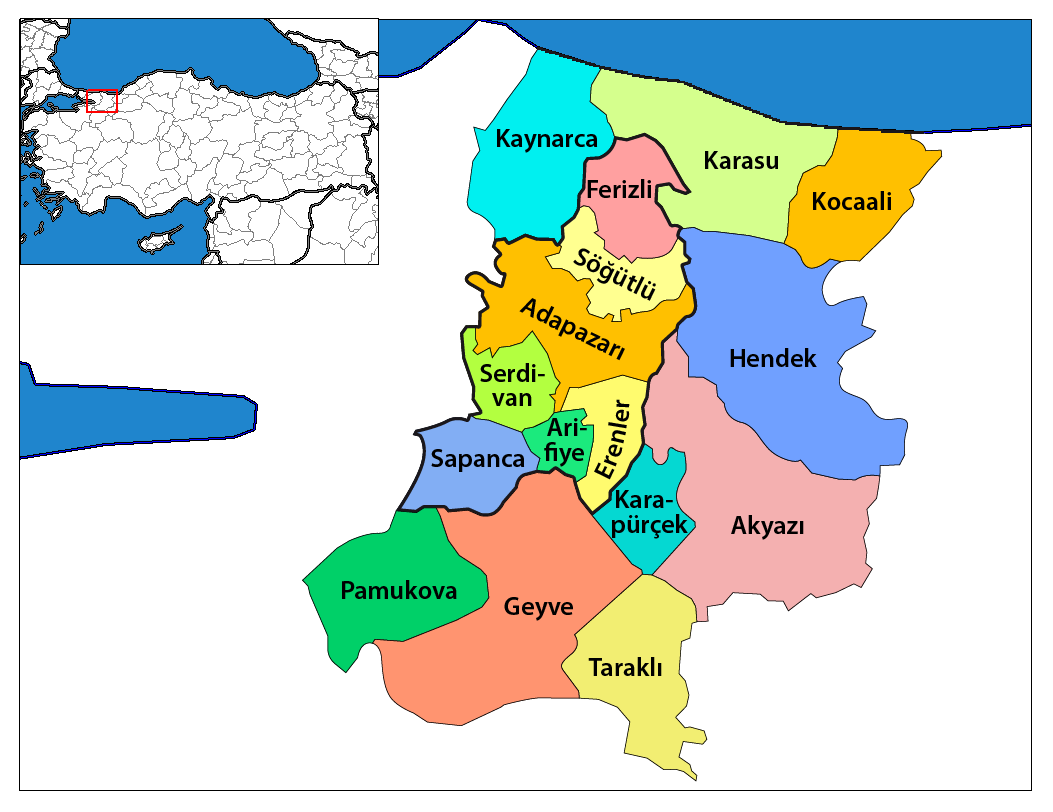
- Map showing Serdivan District in Sakarya Province

- Location within Turkey Location within Marmara
- Coordinates: 40°45′37″N 30°21′15″E
- Country: Turkey
- Province: Sakarya

Government
  - Mayor: Osman Çelik (AKP)
- Area: 130 km^{2} (50 sq mi)
- Population (2022): 162,699
  - Density: 1,300/km^{2} (3,200/sq mi)
- Time zone: UTC+3 (TRT)
- Area code: 0264
- Website: www.serdivan.bel.tr

Serdivan is a municipality and district of Sakarya Province, Turkey. Its area is 130 km^{2}, and its population is 166,321 (2024). It covers the western part of the agglomeration of Adapazarı and the adjacent countryside.

== History ==
Serdivan was established as a village in the 17th century during the Ottoman Empire era primarily with Greek population. Its former name was Petrades. However according to the compulsory population exchange agreement Greek population left the village and the Turks from Greece were settled in the village. Later other Turkish immigrants in 1928 from Albania, in 1934 from Bulgaria and in 1951 from Yugoslavia were also settled in the village. As the population increased, it merged with the province center (Adapazarı) which is close to Serdivan. In 2008 the district Serdivan was created from part of the former central district of Adapazarı/Sakarya Province, along with the districts Adapazarı, Arifiye and Erenler.

== Composition ==
There are 24 neighbourhoods in Serdivan District:

- 32 Evler
- Arabacıalanı
- Aralık
- Aşağıdereköy
- Bahçelievler
- Beşevler
- Beşköprü
- Çubuklu
- Dağyoncalı
- Esentepe
- Hamitabat
- İstiklal
- Kazımpaşa
- Kemalpaşa
- Kızılcıklı
- Köprübaşı
- Kuruçeşme
- Meşeli
- Reşadiye
- Selahiye
- Uzunköy
- Vatan
- Yazlık
- Yukarıdereköy
