= Arifiye railway station =

Railway station in Sakarya, Turkey

Arifiye
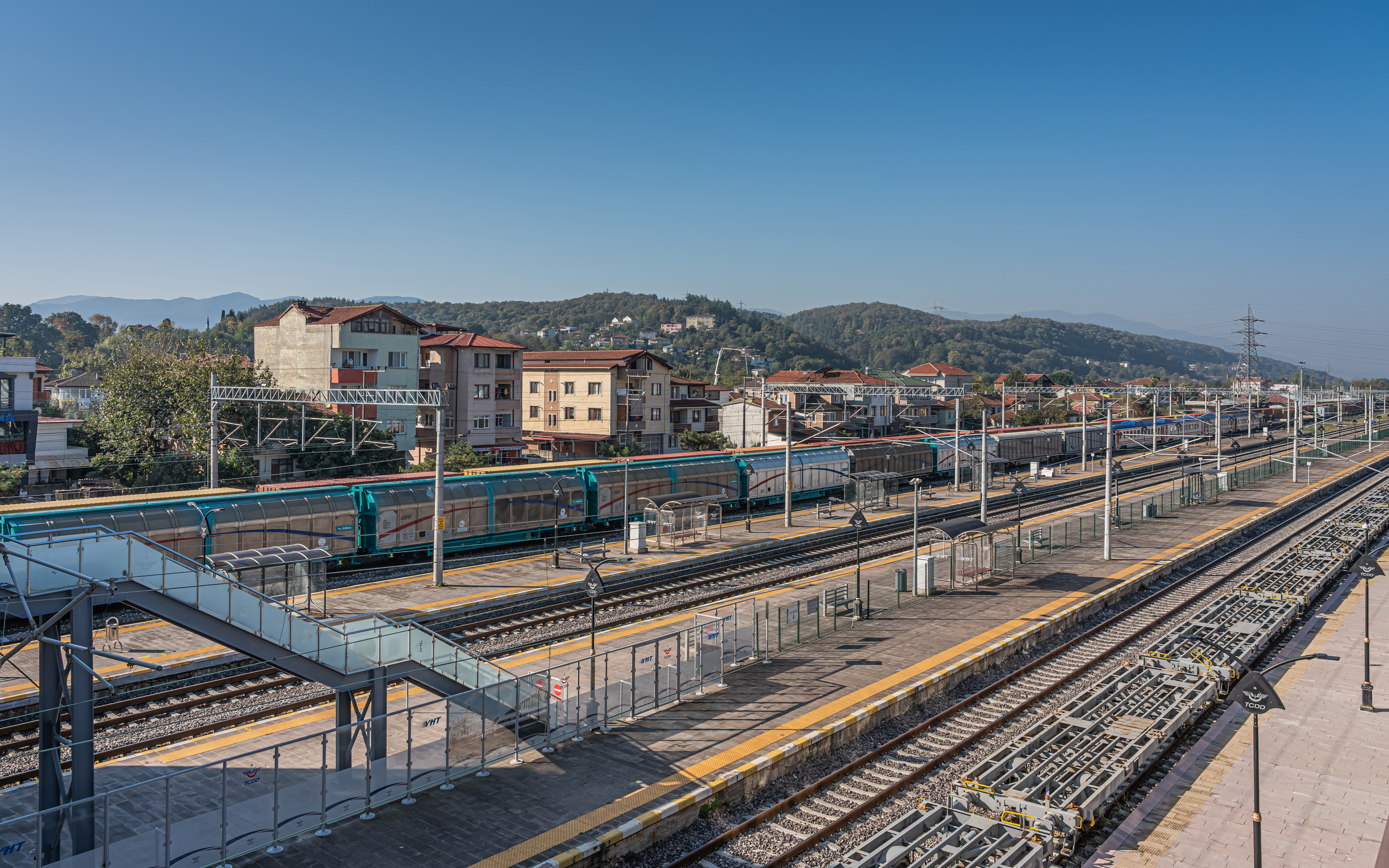

General information
- Location: Istasyon Cd. Arifiye; Turkey
- Coordinates: 40°42′47″N 30°21′20″E
- System: TCDD high-speed and regional rail station Adaray commuter rail station
- Owner: Turkish State Railways
- Lines: Istanbul-Ankara railway Arifiye-Adapazarı railway
- Platforms: 3
- Tracks: 5

Construction
- Structure type: At-Grade
- Parking: Yes
- Accessible: Yes

Other information
- Station code: 1512

History
- Opened: 1 September 1891
- Rebuilt: 1976-77, 2012-14
- Electrified: 1977

Services
| Preceding station | TCDD Taşımacılık | Following station |
|---|---|---|
| İzmit towards Istanbul Halkalı | Yüksek Hızlı Tren | Bilecik towards Ankara |
| İzmit towards Istanbul Halkalı | Yüksek Hızlı Tren | Bilecik towards Karaman |
| İzmit towards Istanbul Halkalı | Ankara Express | Bilecik towards Ankara |
| Sapanca towards Gebze | Ada Express | Mithatpaşa towards Adapazarı |
| Preceding station | ADA | Following station |
| Terminus | Adaray | Bahçelievler towards Adapazarı |
Former services
| Preceding station | Turkish State Railways | Following station |
|---|---|---|
| Pendik Old towards Istanbul | Capital Express | Bilecik towards Ankara |
| Pendik Old towards Istanbul | Republic Express | Bilecik towards Ankara |
| Pendik Old towards Istanbul | Fatih Express | Bilecik towards Ankara |
| Pendik Old towards Istanbul | Anatolian Express | Bilecik towards Ankara |
| Pendik Old towards Istanbul | Ankara Express | Bilecik towards Ankara |
| Pendik Old towards Istanbul | Eskişehir Express | Bilecik towards Eskişehir |
| Pendik Old towards Istanbul | Sakarya Express | Bilecik towards Eskişehir |
| Uzunkum towards Istanbul | Adapazarı Express | Mithatpaşa towards Adapazarı |
Location

Arifiye station is a railway station on the Istanbul-Ankara railway in the town of Arifiye, a suburb of Adapazarı. The station is served by the Turkish State Railways as well as Adaray commuter service. The State Railways operates its premier high-speed rail service from Istanbul to Ankara and Konya as well as a premier limited-stop regional train service to Istanbul. Adaray operates commuter rail service to Adapazarı from Arifiye, which is the southern terminus.

Arifiye was originally opened on 1 September 1891 by the Anatolian Railway and taken over by the Turkish State Railways in 1927. The station was rebuilt in 1977 to increase capacity and again from 2012 to 2014 to accommodate a new high-speed rail service.
