= Ada Express =

Train service

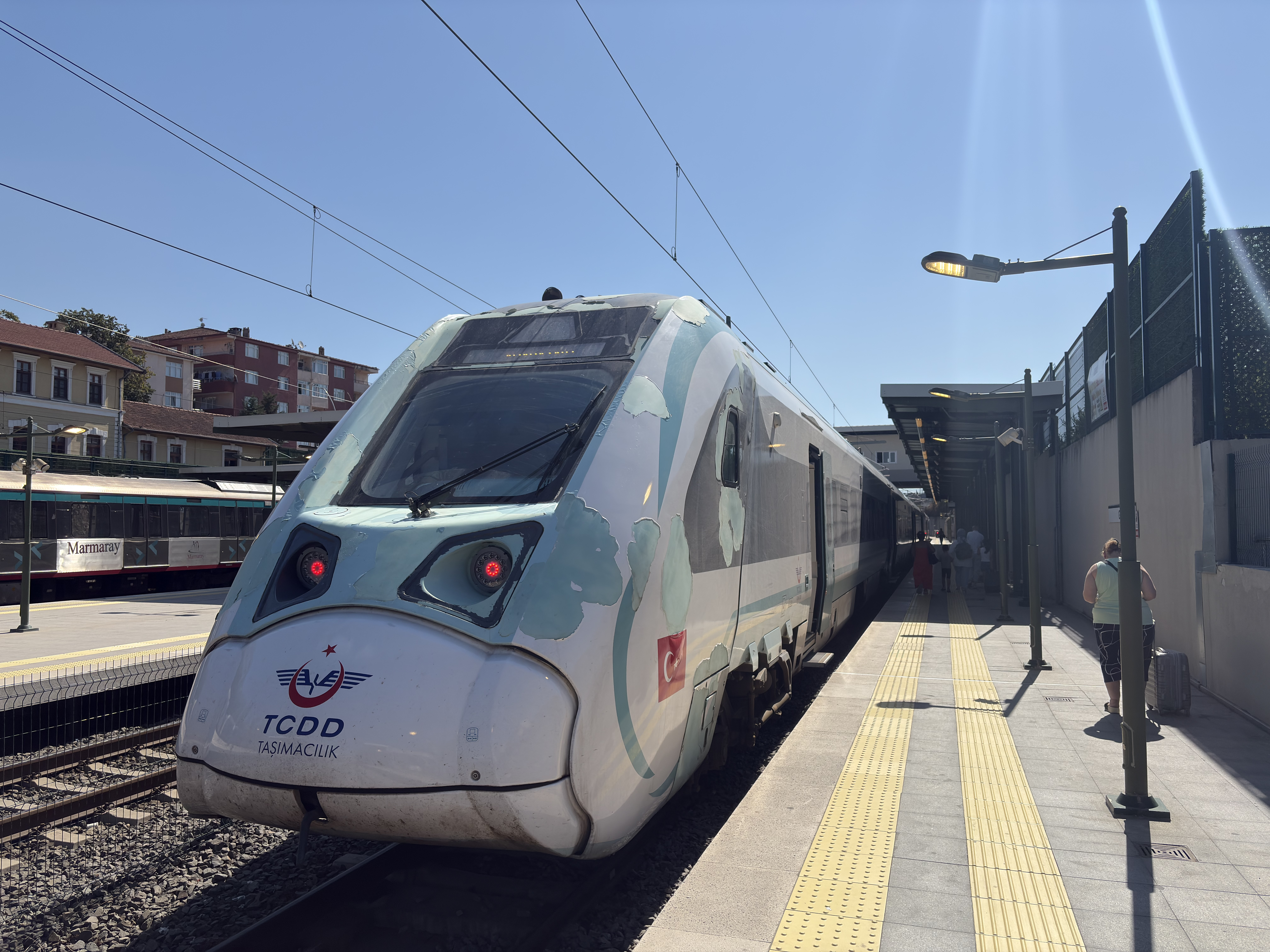
- E44003, at Gebze.

Overview
- Service type: Regional rail
- Status: Operating
- Locale: Northwestern Anatolia
- Predecessor: Adapazarı Express
- First service: 5 January 2015
- Current operator: TCDD Taşımacılık
- Former operator: Turkish State Railways

Route
- Termini: Gebze station, Gebze; Adapazarı station, Adapazarı
- Stops: 11
- Distance travelled: 107.1 km (66.5 mi)
- Average journey time: 1 hour, 15 minutes
- Service frequency: 6 daily

On-board services
- Disabled access: Yes
- Seating arrangements: Coach
- Catering facilities: No

Technical
- Rolling stock: TVS2000, E44000
- Track gauge: 1,435 mm (4 ft 8 1/2 in)
- Electrification: 25 kV AC, 50 Hz
- Operating speed: 90 km/h (56 mph) (average); 140 km/h (87 mph) (max)
- Track owner: TCDD

The Ada Express (Turkish: Ada Ekspresi) is a limited stop regional train service operating between Gebze, Kocaeli and Sakarya. It was inaugurated on 5 January 2015 as a replacement for the popular Adapazarı Express train service. However, unlike its predecessor, the Ada Express does not make local stops and run as often and it does not operate into central Adapazarı. Trains mostly consist of TVS2000 cars and use E68000 series locomotives for motive power. Turkey's National Electric Train has also been in use on the Ada Express since May 27, 2023.

== Gallery ==
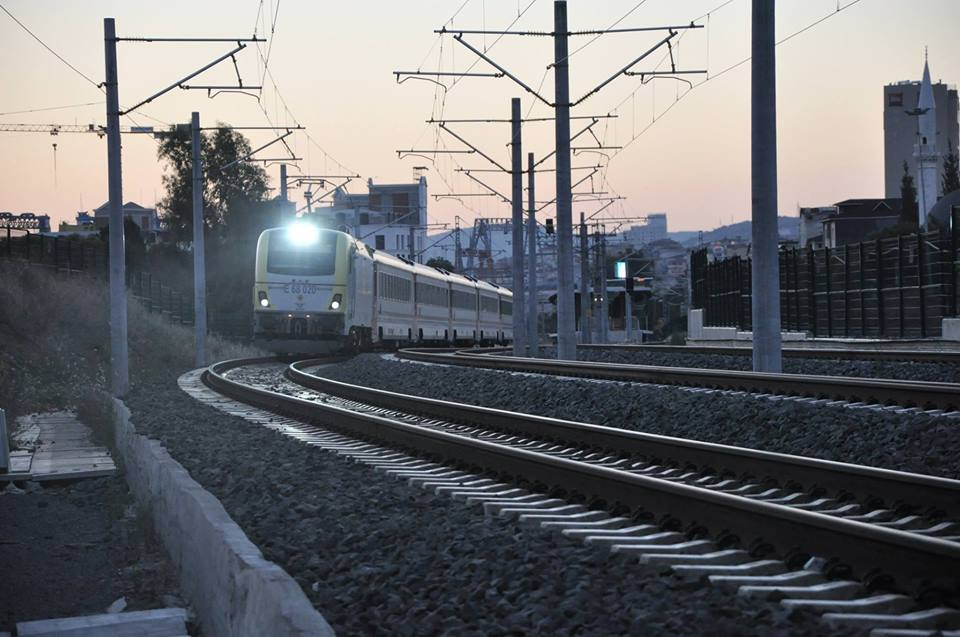
An eastbound train in Istanbul.
