= Adapazarı Express =

Regional rail service in Turkey

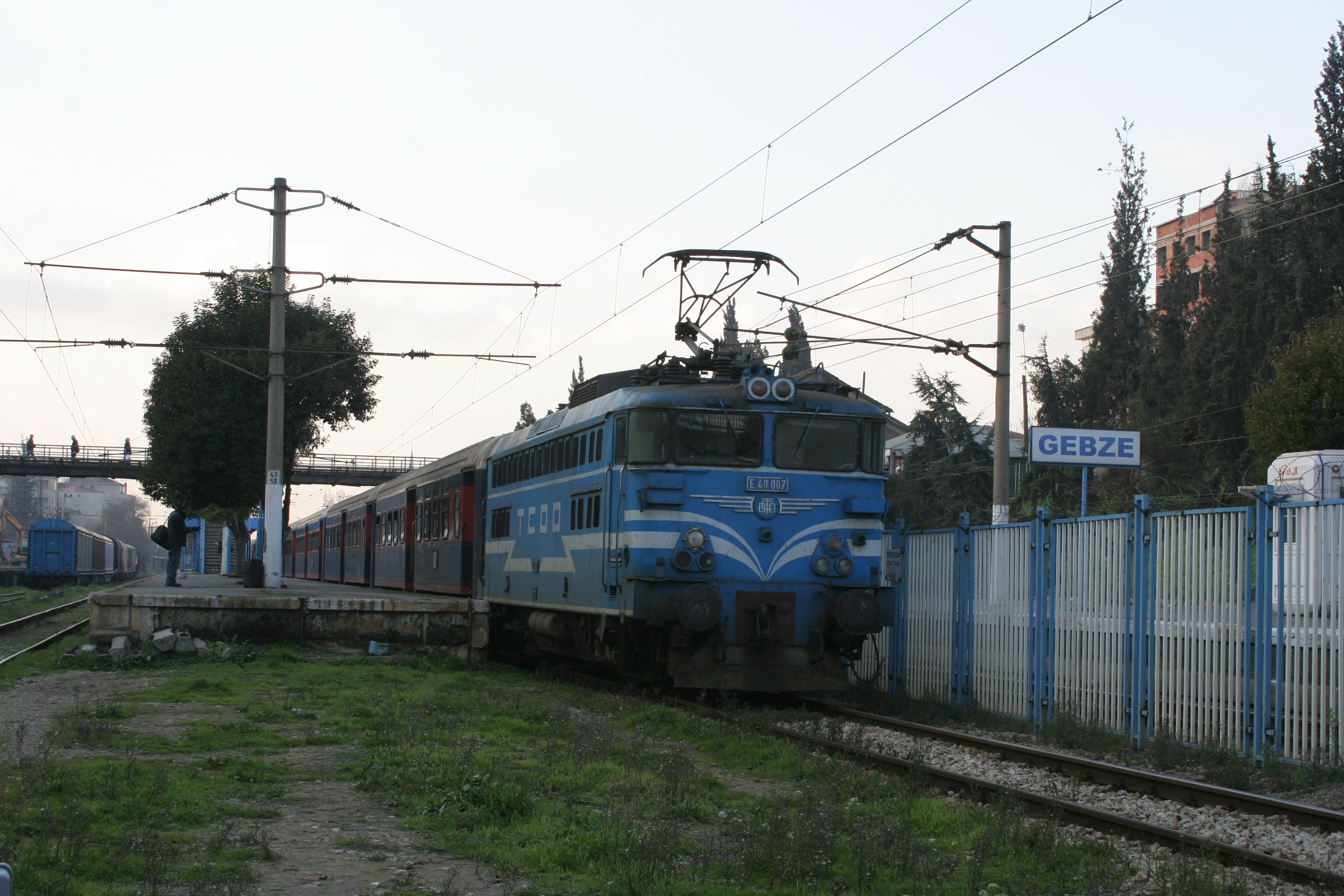
- An eastbound train departing Gebze in 2006.

Overview
- Service type: Regional rail
- Status: Operating
- Locale: Northwestern Anatolia
- First service: 6 February 1977
- Last service: 1 February 2012
- Successor: Ada Express
- Current operator: TCDD
- Former operator: CFOA

Route
- Termini: Haydarpaşa station, Istanbul; Adapazarı station, Adapazarı
- Stops: 29
- Distance travelled: 144.4 km (89.7 mi)
- Average journey time: 2h58m (Eastbound); 2h58m (Westbound)
- Service frequency: 24 daily
- Train number: 11601-11624

On-board services
- Seating arrangements: Coach

Technical
- Track gauge: 1,435 mm (4 ft 8 1/2 in)
- Electrification: 25 kV AC
- Operating speed: 120 km/h (75 mph) max
- Track owner: TCDD

The Adapazarı Express (Turkish: Adapazarı Ekspresi) officially listed as the Haydarpaşa-Adapazarı Regional (Turkish: Haydarpaşa-Adapazarı Bölgeseli) was a regional rail service, that ran between Istanbul and Adapazarı. For the majority of its time in service, it was the second-busiest route of the Turkish State Railways, after the Adana-Mersin Regional. Trains served a heavily populated region on the north-east shores of the Sea of Marmara and the Sakarya plain. Service was frequent with 12 trains daily in each direction in 2012. The Regional service also passed through important districts of Istanbul such as Kadıköy, Maltepe, Kartal, Pendik, Tuzla as well as Gebze, İzmit and Adapazarı. Because of the cities, the train service earned the nickname Metropolitan Express. The train used to service Coşkunoğulları station until the TOE (Turkish Automotive Industry) factory was closed in 1991. It also serviced Acısu, Tepetarla and Kurtköy stations until 1998. Due to the construction of the Istanbul-Ankara high-speed railway, the Haydarpaşa-Adapazarı Regional service was discontinued on 1 February 2012 in order to upgrade the existing railway line. On 5 January 2015 service between Arifiye and Pendik was reopened with a new, faster regional service known as the Ada Express.

== Equipment ==
Trains were usually 6-8 cars long with a single electric locomotive. Towards the end of its run, trains were mostly combined out of cars from the Regional Fleet and Intercity Fleet cars. On occasion, a train was double-headed for special purposes.

Before TCDD rehabilitated its old intercity and regional fleet, the electric locomotives which pulled trains were the E40000 or the E52500 series, and cars consisted of black and red regional cars that were built by TÜVASAŞ primarily for this service. Also during the 1990s, MT5600 were used for a brief period of time. Due to ridership, these DRCs couldn't handle the capacity. In the late 2000s/early 2010s trains used refurbished regional and intercity cars that came into service in the 1970s, with the conductor car being either the first or last car. The E43000 were the only type of locomotives that pulled trains, as well as pulling express service on the line to Ankara and other cities. The route was the last stronghold for regional cars as well, as they were replaced with DMUs on other routes. Sometimes E14000 EMUs, used for commuter service in İstanbul and previously Ankara, were used for special holidays or weekend service when extra equipment was needed.

== Pictures ==
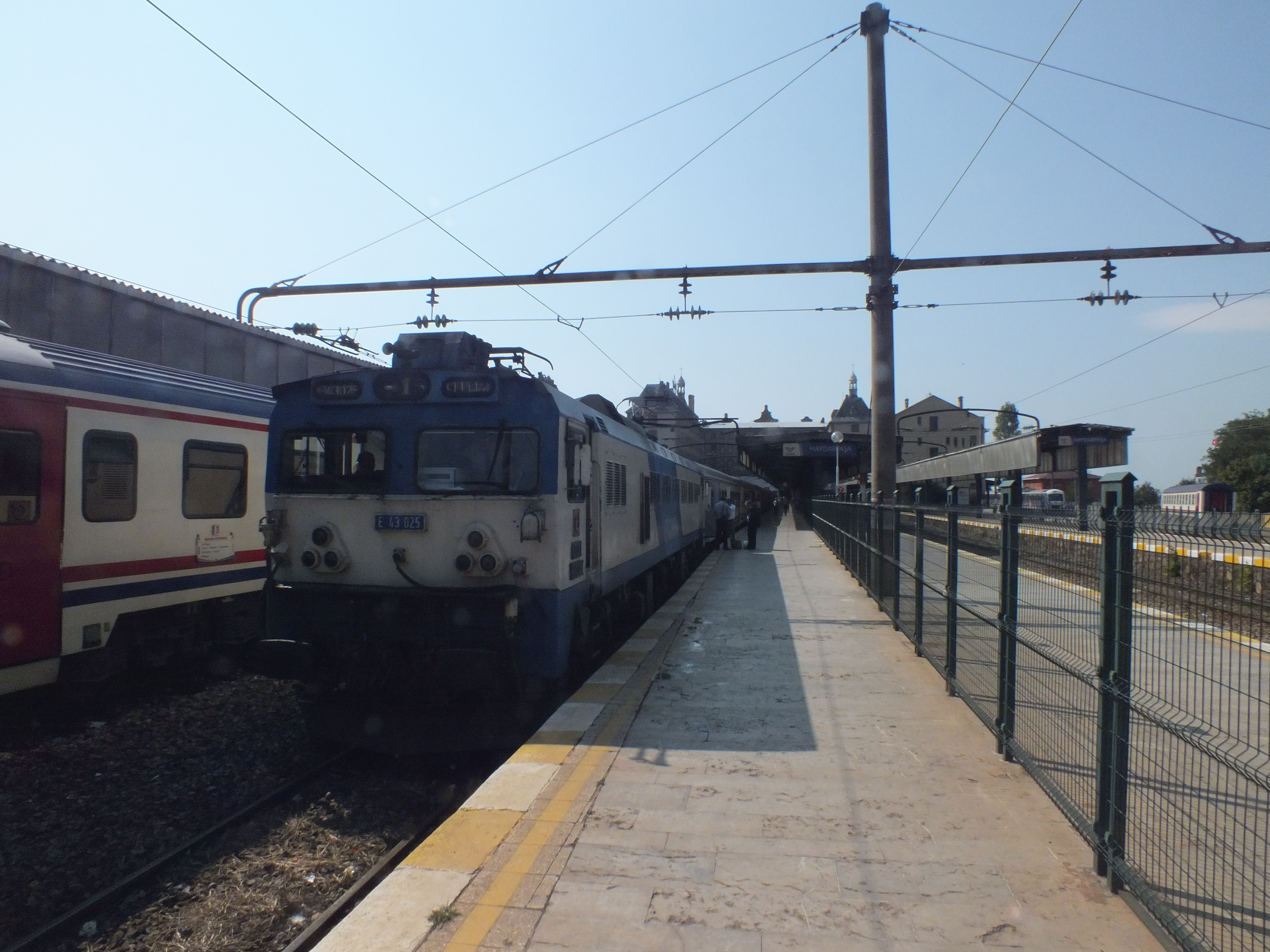
Train #11612 about to depart Haydarpaşa in October 2011.

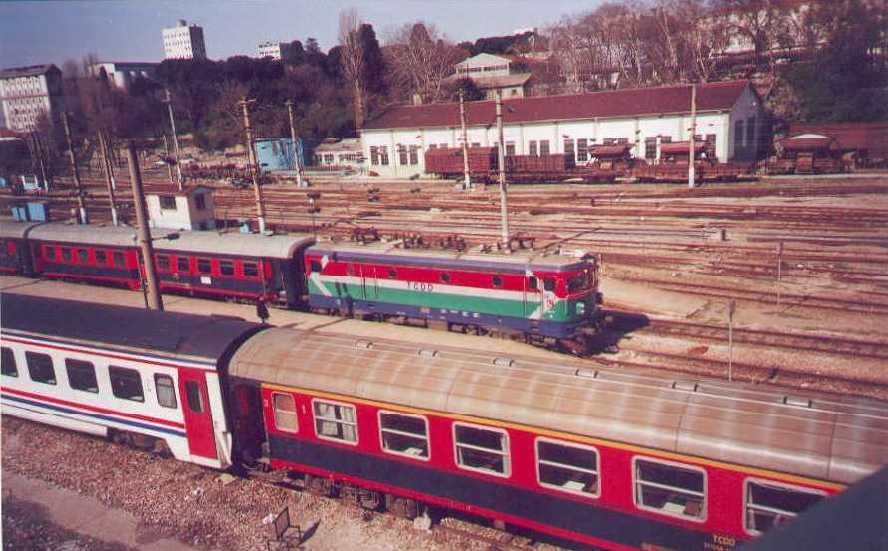
An eastbound train leaving Haydarpaşa station in March 2001.

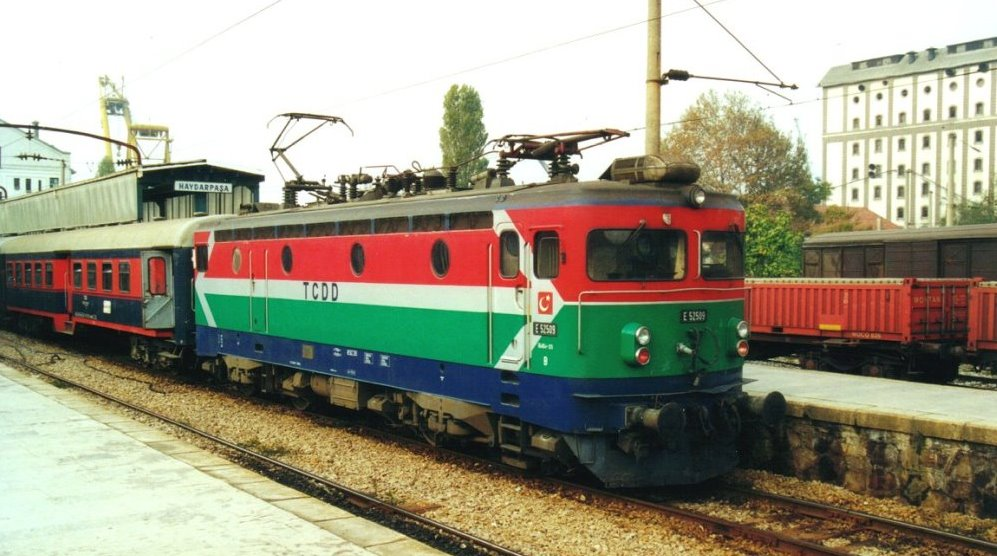
A train waiting to depart Haydarpaşa station in November 2000.
