= Arifiye =

- District and municipality
- Logo

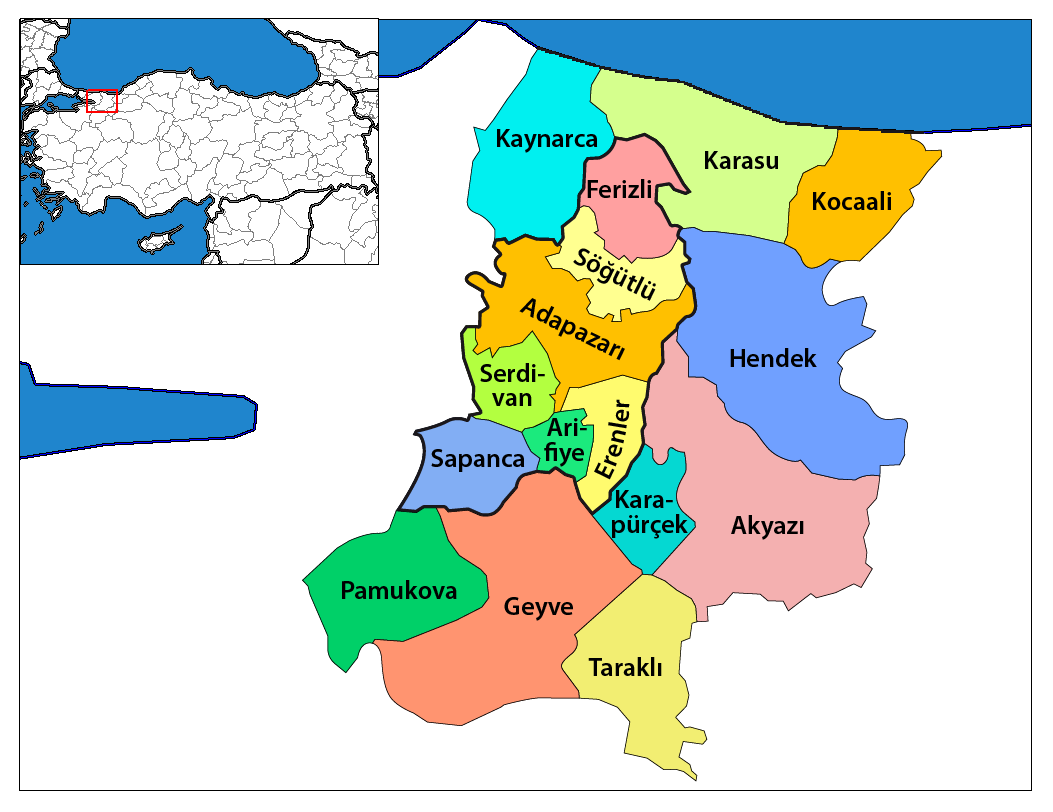
- Map showing Arifiye District in Sakarya Province

- Location within Turkey Location within Marmara
- Coordinates: 40°43′N 30°22′E
- Country: Turkey
- Province: Sakarya

Government
  - Mayor: İsmail Karakullukçu (AK Party)
- Area: 75 km^{2} (29 sq mi)
- Elevation: 40 m (130 ft)
- Population (2022): 49,340
  - Density: 660/km^{2} (1,700/sq mi)
- Time zone: UTC+3 (TRT)
- Postal code: 54580
- Area code: 0264
- Climate: Cfa
- Website: www.arifiye.bel.tr

Arifiye is a municipality and district of Sakarya Province, Turkey. Its area is 75 km^{2}, and its population 49,340 (2022). It covers the southernmost part of the agglomeration of Adapazarı and the adjacent countryside.

== Geography ==
Arifiye is situated just to the east of Lake Sapanca. It is almost merged to Adapazarı the center of the province and is a part of Greater Sakarya. (see Metropolitan centers in Turkey). Arifiye is on Turkish Motorway O-4 and state highway D.100, both of which connect Istanbul to Ankara. It is also an important railway junction.

== History ==
Arifiye is a part of the ancient region of Bithynia. It later on fell to Roman Empire and Byzantine Empire. In the Middle Ages, it was plundered several times by the Sassanid Persians, Umayyad Arabs and Russians. After a brief occupation by the Seljuk Turks it was returned to Byzantines during the First Crusade. In 1326 Ottoman Turks annexed Arifiye. Although an important stop on Silk Road in the Middle Ages, because of frequent floods of the nearby Lake Sapanca it was not a populous settlement. During Turkish Republic, its population increased and by 1956 it was declared a seat of township. In 2008 the district Arifiye was created from part of the former central district of Adapazarı/Sakarya Province, along with the districts Adapazarı, Erenler and Serdivan.

== Economy ==
Formerly the major economic sector in Arifiye was agriculture. But after the 1970s, Arifiye became an important center of the automotive subindustry. Toyota has a plant here, where they manufacture the Toyota C-HR.

The bus terminal of Greater Sakarya is also in Arifiye. The Arifiye railway station is served by high-speed trains between Istanbul and Ankara, and by the commuter service between Gebze and Adapazarı. It was the westernmost terminal of the Adana-Istanbul railway from February 2012 to 2015, while construction took place in Istanbul's Haydarpaşa train station.

== Composition ==
There are 24 neighbourhoods in Arifiye District:

- Adliye
- Ahmediye
- Arifbey
- Aşağı Kirazca
- Boğazköy
- Çaybaşıfuadiye
- Çınardibi
- Cumhuriyet
- Fatih
- Hacıköy
- Hanlı Merkez
- Hanlı Sakarya
- Hanlıköy
- Karaaptiler
- Karaçomaklar
- Kemaliye
- Kirazca
- Kışlaçay
- Kumbaşı
- Mollaköy
- Neviye
- Semerciler
- Türkçaybaşı
- Yukarıkirazca
