= Adapazarı railway station =

Railway station in Sakarya, Turkey

Adapazarı
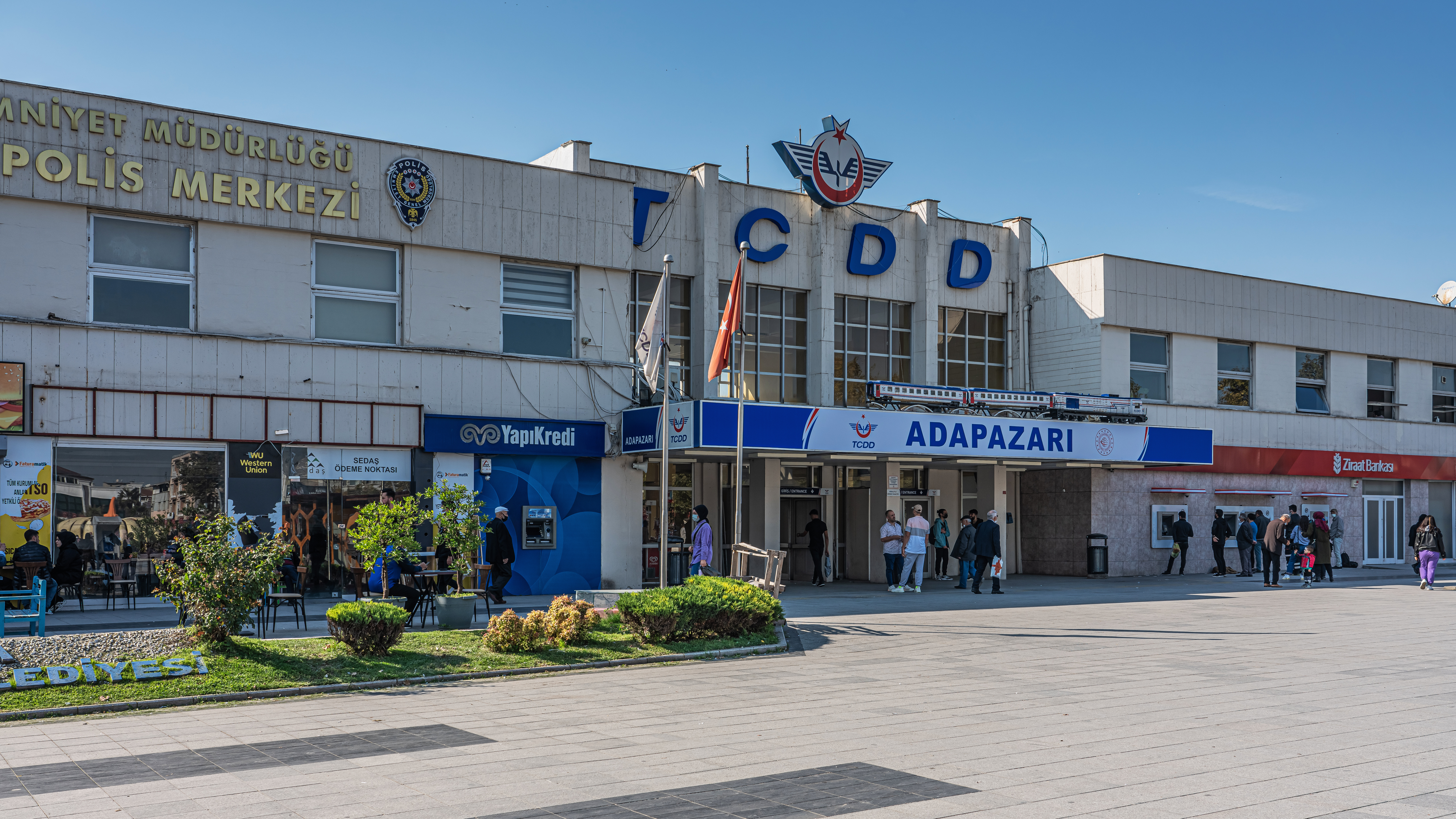
- The station building in 2021

General information
- Location: Gar meydanı, 54100 Semerciler, Sakarya; Turkey
- Coordinates: 40.462961°N 30.240040°E
- Owner: Turkish State Railways
- Platforms: 4
- Tracks: 6

Construction
- Parking: Located next to the station's plaza

History
- Opened: 1899
- Closed: 2012-13, 12 December 2016
- Rebuilt: 1969
- Electrified: 1969

Services
Preceding station	TCDD Taşımacılık	Following station
Mithatpaşa towards Gebze	Ada Express	Terminus
Preceding station	ADA	Following station
Kentparkı towards Arifiye	Adaray	Terminus
Former services
Preceding station	Turkish State Railways	Following station
Mithatpaşa towards Istanbul	Adapazarı Express	Terminus
Location

Adapazarı station is the main terminal railway station in the city of Adapazarı. It is the eastern terminus of the Haydarpaşa-Adapazarı Regional, the most heavily used rail service line in Turkey and second most in service frequency. The station is located in the city center. The other two stations serving Adapazarı are Mithatpaşa railway station, located in southwestern Adapazarı and Arifye railway station, in Adapazarı's southern suburb. The station is situated on the north end of the Adapazarı Branch, which connects to the Istanbul––Ankara Main Line at Arifye.

The station was opened in November 1899 by the Anatolian Railway (CFOA). The railway intended to continue to the railway to Bolu and then Ankara, but this never happened and the station became a terminal. In 1969, the line was electrified and new improved regional service added to Istanbul. On February 1, 2012, the station temporarily closed down due to the construction of the Ankara–Istanbul high-speed railway, however a project that if approved will lead to the abandonment of the station in favor of building a new station in Arifiye, which is 8.13 km (5.05 mi) southwest of the city center.

The station is used for storing rail cars, but since 2019 it has served as the main station for Ada Express. Since 29 October 2024, Adaray suburban line is restored and Adapazarı serves as terminus for the line.
