= Adapazarı =

- District and municipality
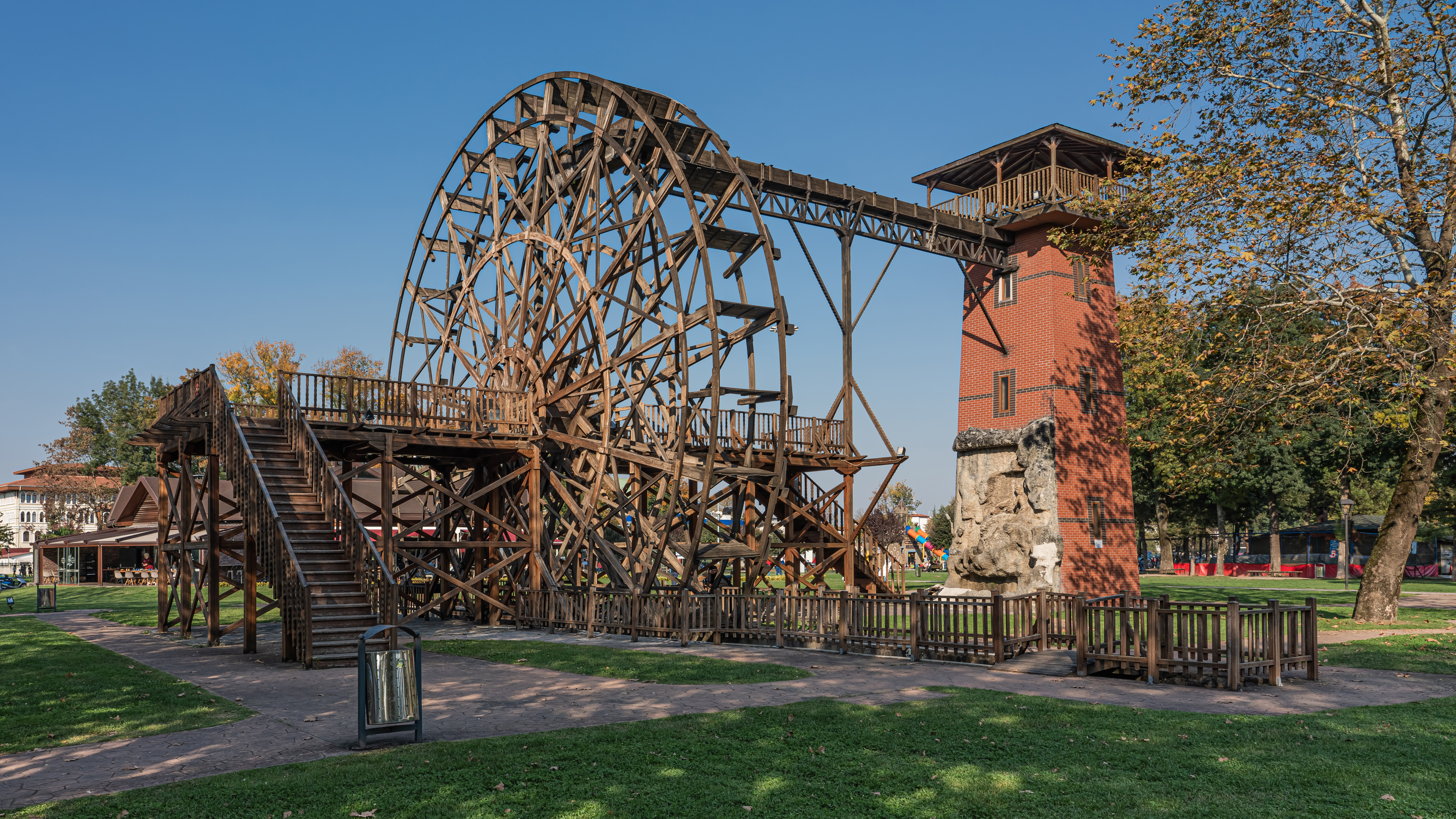

- Coat of arms

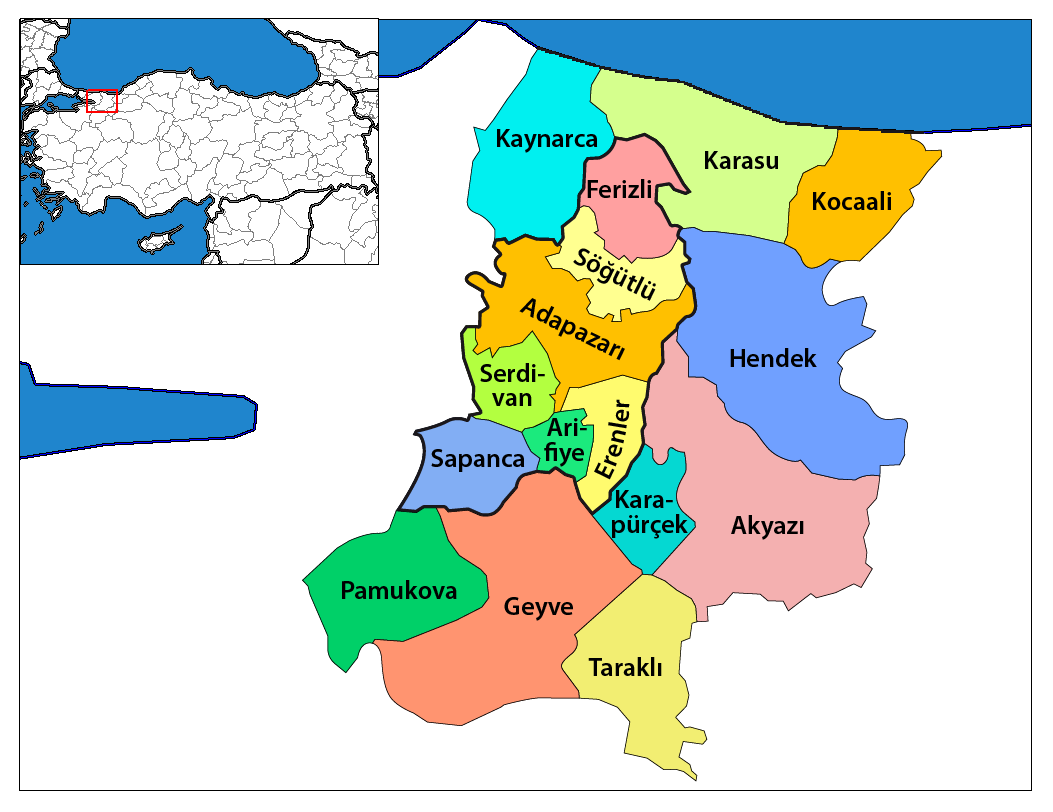
- Map showing Adapazarı District in Sakarya Province

- Location within Turkey Location within Marmara
- Coordinates: 40°47′N 30°24′E
- Country: Turkey
- Province: Sakarya

Government
  - Mayor: Mutlu Işıksu (Ind.)
- Area: 324 km^{2} (125 sq mi)
- Elevation: 31 m (102 ft)
- Population (2022): 281,489
  - Density: 869/km^{2} (2,250/sq mi)
- Time zone: UTC+3 (TRT)
- Area code: 0264
- Climate: Cfa
- Website: www.adapazari.bel.tr

Adapazarı (pronounced [ɑˈdɑpɑzɑɾɯ]) is a municipality and the capital district of Sakarya Province, Turkey. Its area is 324 km^{2}, and its population 281,489 (2022). It covers the central and northern part of the agglomeration of Adapazarı and the adjacent countryside.

== History ==
The history of Adapazarı dates back to 378 BC, when it was called Agrilion (Ἀγρίλιον in Greek). Ancient settlers included Phrygians, Bithynians, Cimmerians, Lydians, Greeks, and Persians, but Adapazarı got its identity from the ancient Hellenistic, Roman, and Greek Byzantine rulers. After Alexander the Great's conquests, the Persians were forced out of the region.

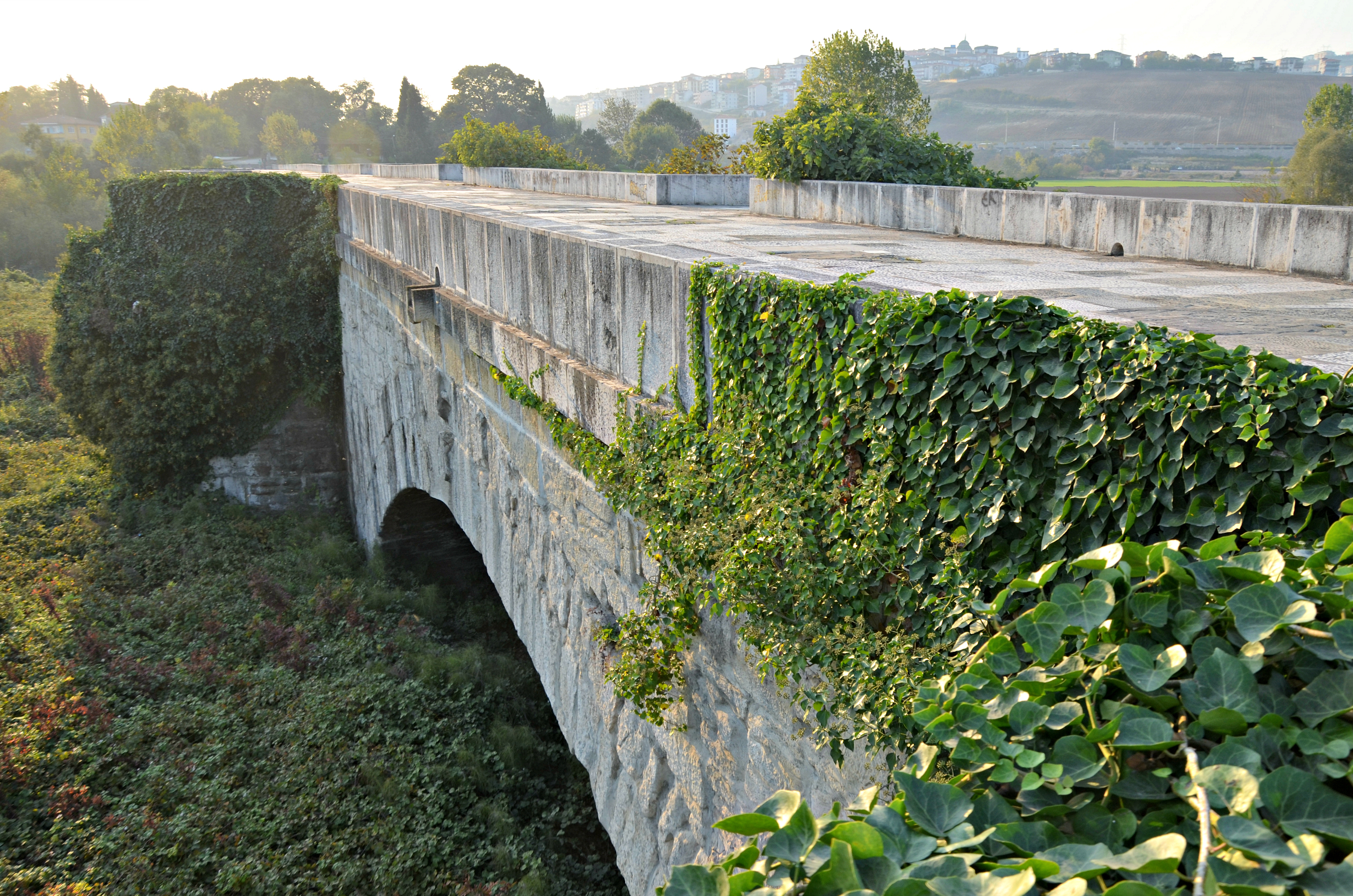
Sangarius Bridge built by the East Roman Emperor Justinian I

One of the most important remains of historical significance is the Sangarius Bridge (Turkish: Beş Köprü) built by Byzantine Emperor Justinian in 533 AD. Historically, it was situated on the old military road from Constantinople (now Istanbul) to the east, connected, since the end of the 19th century, by a branch line with the Anatolian railway. It was founded in 1400 by 400 Armenian immigrant families who escaped from Timur's oppression in Sivas and was named "Donigaşen" after the name of their leaders. Today's inhabitants are Manavs. The native Muslims are Armenians and Greeks who gradually converted to Islam, and it should not be ignored that Turk households settled in the region. Adapazarı's known name in Turkish at that time was Adacık and Ada. The source of the information that the region was conquered by Orhan Gazi and opened to settlement is also unknown.

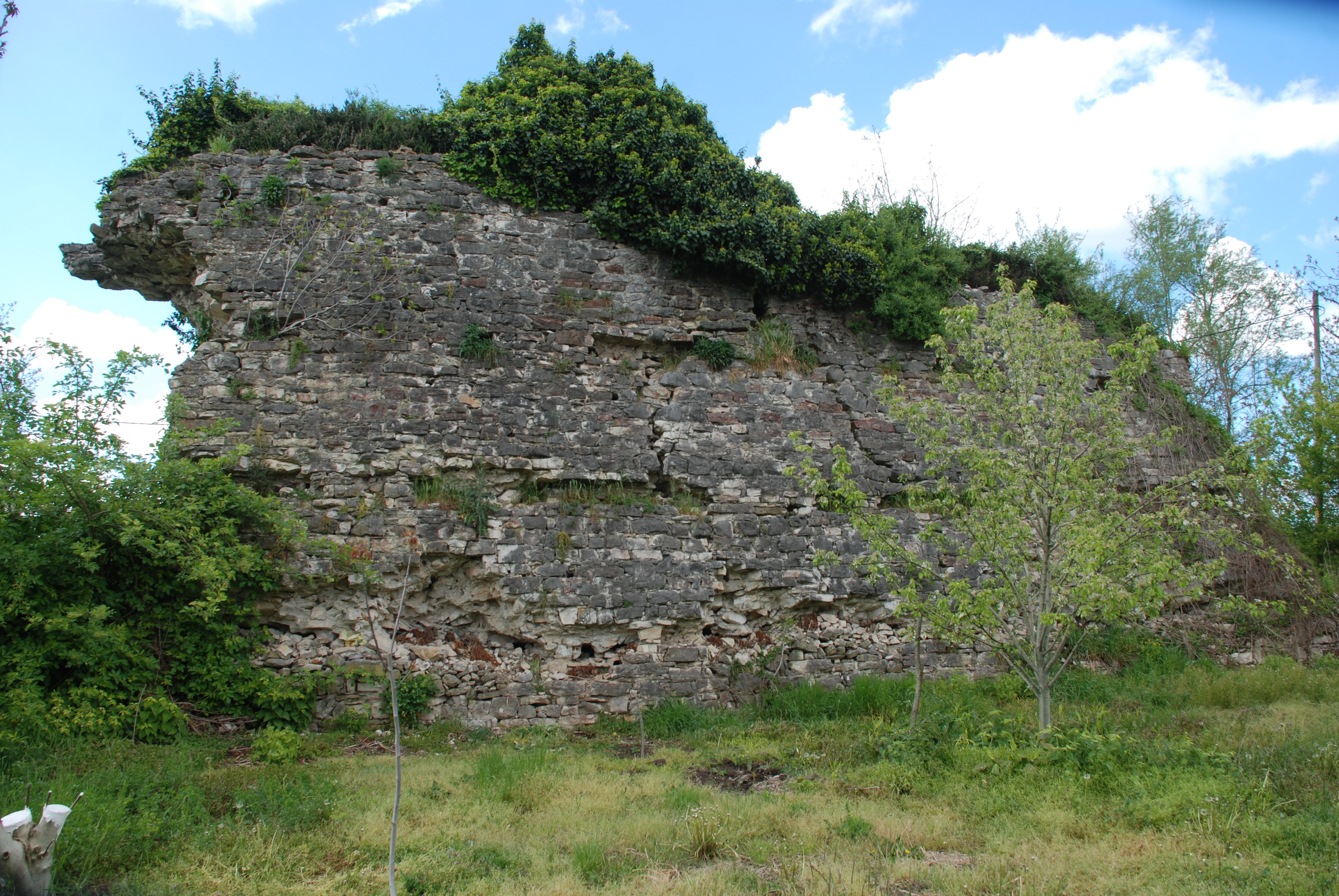
Ruins of the 12th century Byzantine castle.

In 1868, the Adapazarı Municipality was officially founded in the town called Der Seadet. A sugar factory and agricultural sugar factory attracted many migrants and accelerated the industrialization of the city. A law passed on 17 June 1954 in the Grand National Assembly saw the city separated from Kocaeli Province and made the center of its own province. The 1999 Marmara earthquake affected Adapazarı and inflicted losses in lives and material damage. In 2008 the district Adapazarı was created from part of the former central district of Adapazarı Province, along with the districts Arifiye, Erenler and Serdivan. At the same time, the province was renamed Sakarya after the Sakarya River which runs through it.

== Economy ==
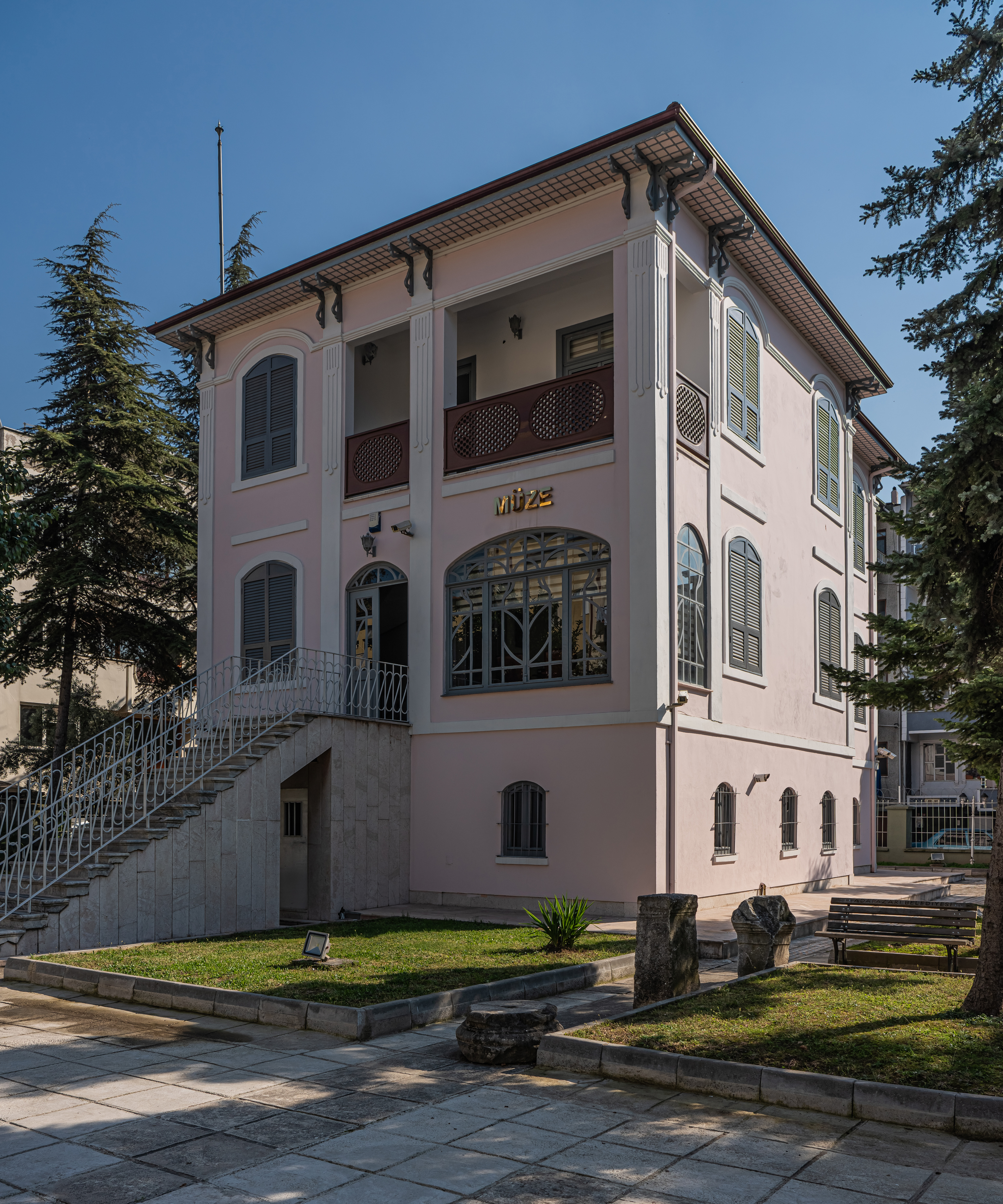
Sakarya Museum

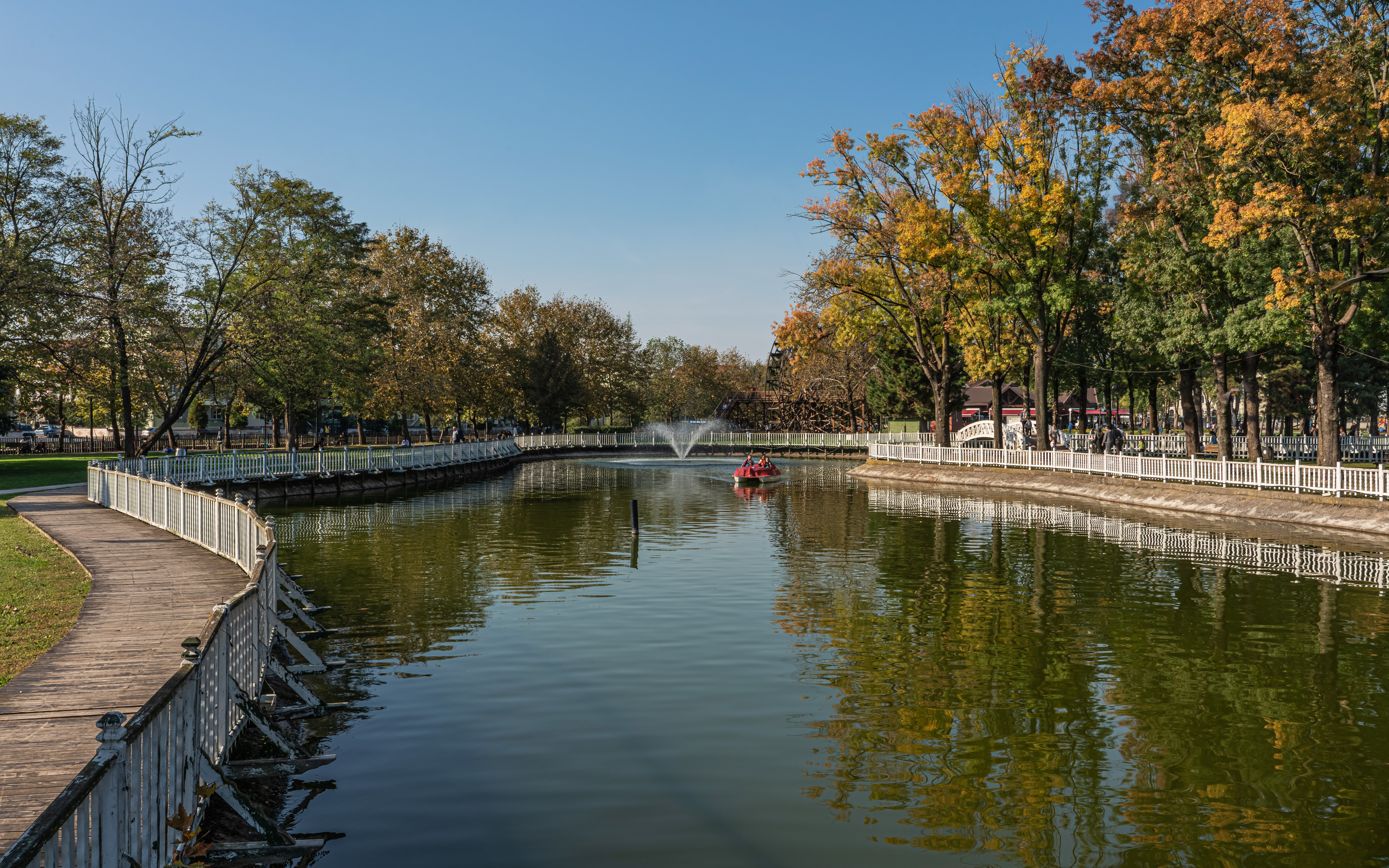
Sakarya Kent Park

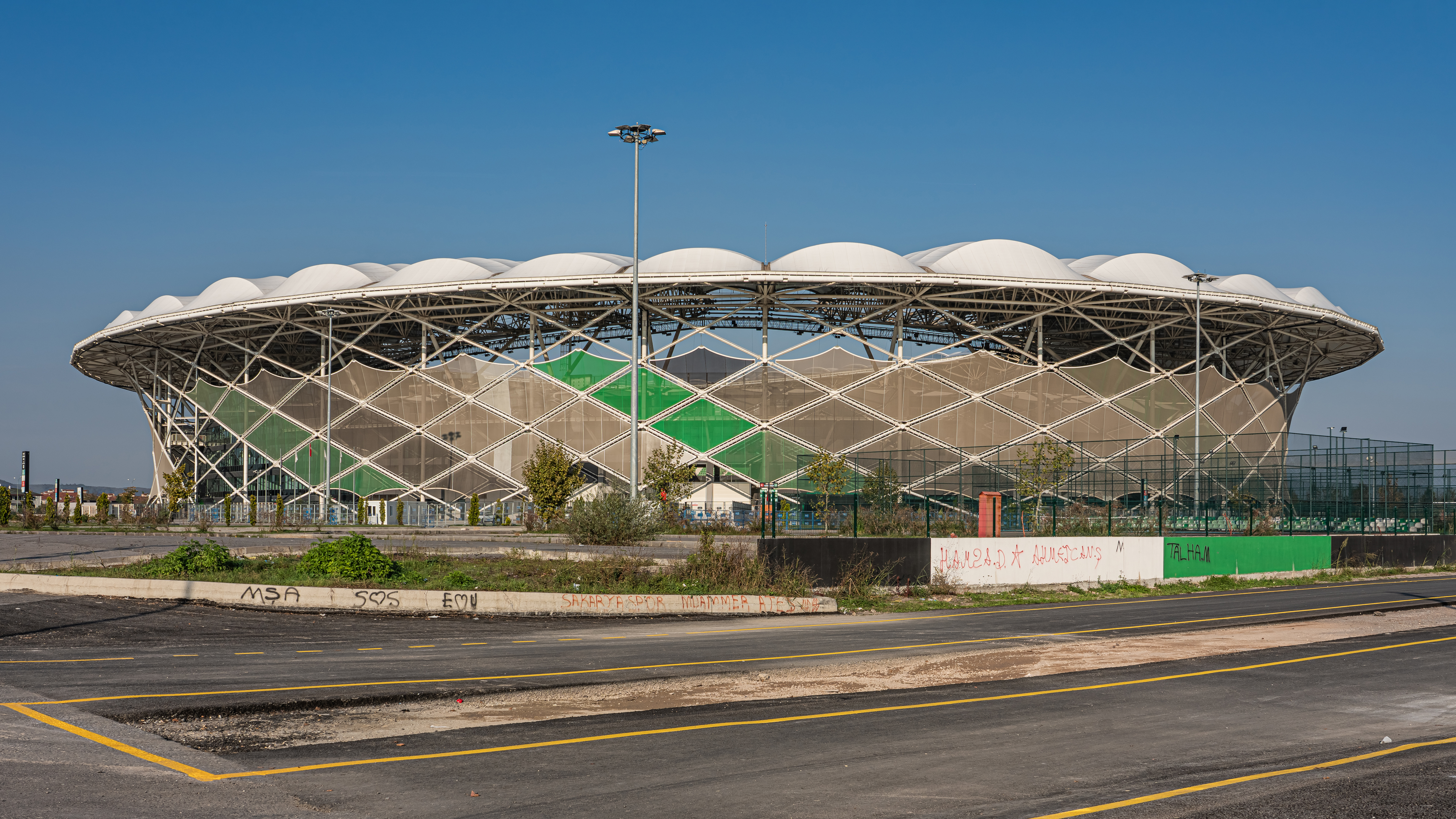
New Sakarya Stadium

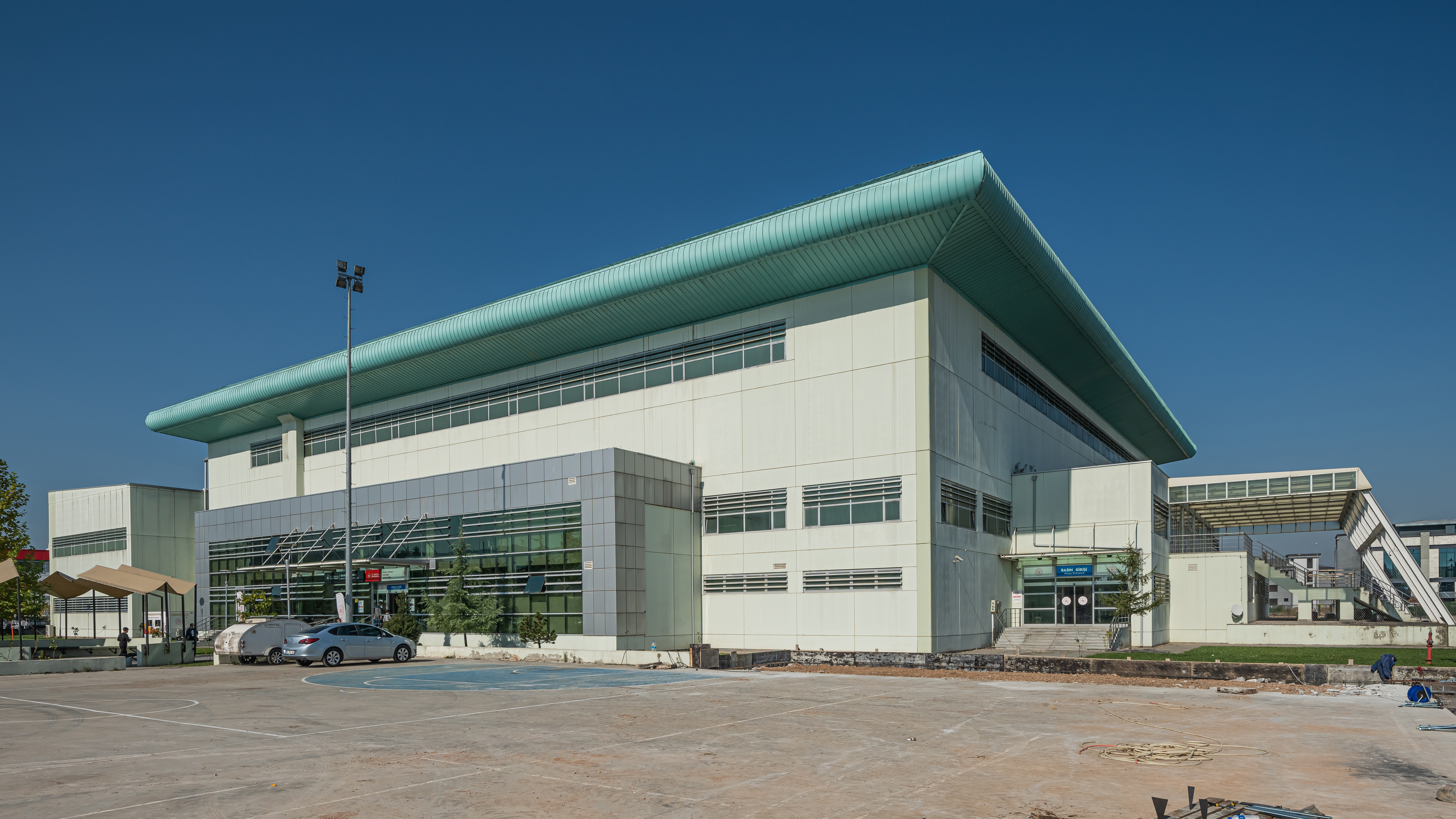
Sakarya Arena

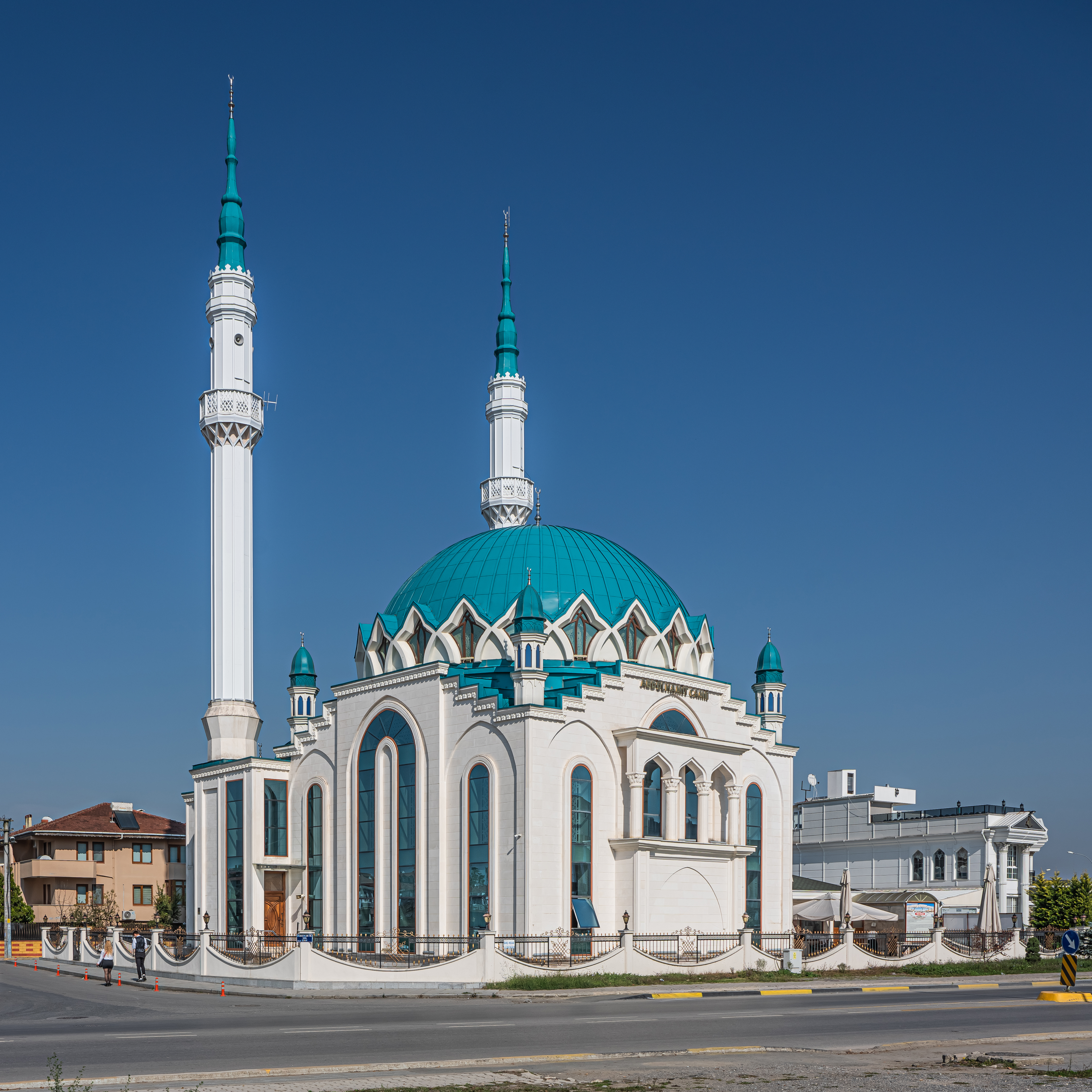
Adapazarı Abdülhamit Mosque

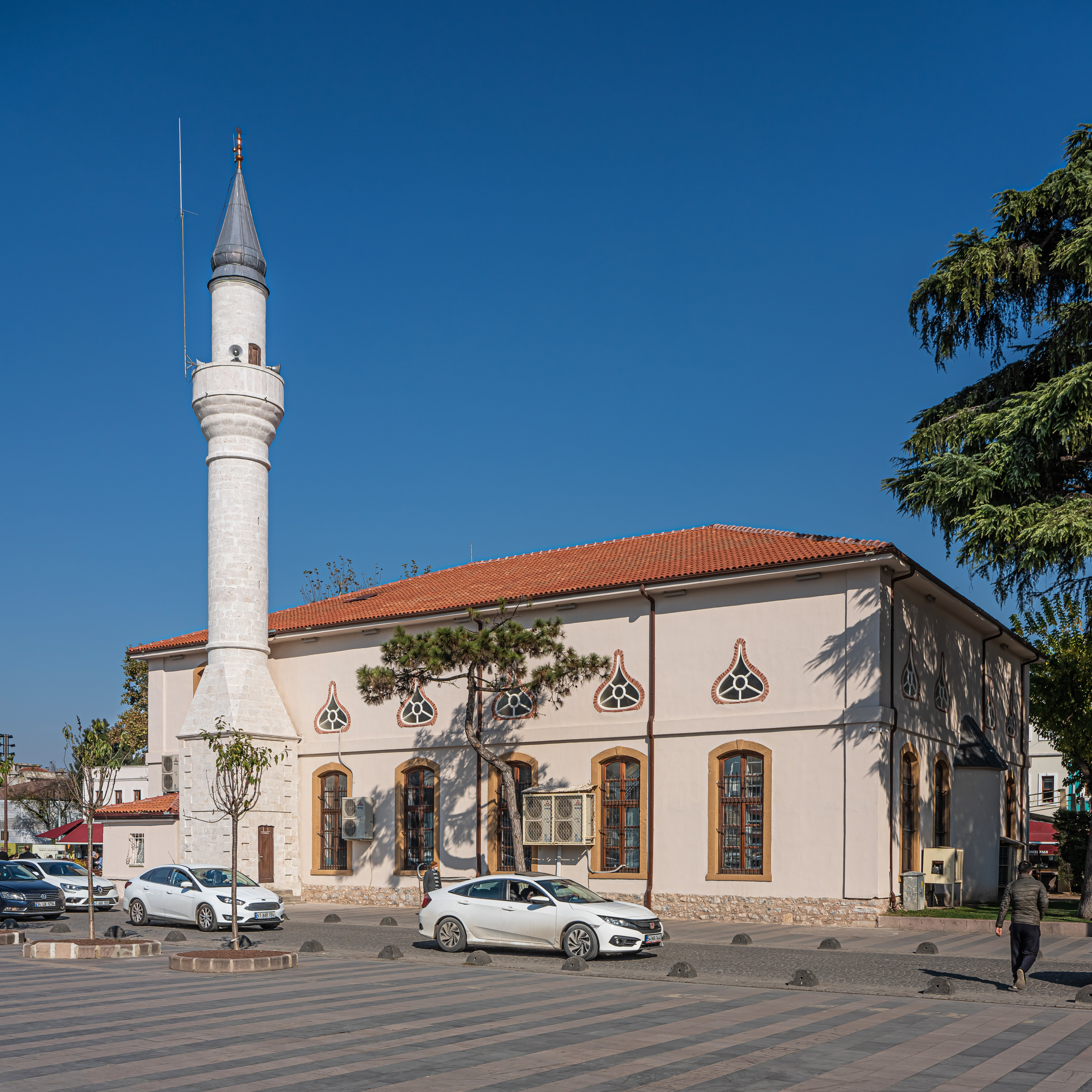
Adapazarı Orhan Mosque

Adapazarı is the location of a large automobile factory owned by the Toyota Motor Corporation, as well as the Hyundai EURotem train factory. Tank Pallet 1st Main Maintenance, one of the biggest Turkish defense contractors, and Otokar, a major manufacturer of buses and military vehicles, are located in Sakarya. Other major industries in the city and its surrounding province include textile factories for silk and linen products. Agriculture and forestry also form an important part of the city's economy, with the production of tobacco, hazelnuts (fındık variety), walnut-wood, cocoons and vegetables. Adapazari is one of the most important industrial capitals of Turkey. While Turkey is a developing country, the city of Adapazari renovated its infrastructure and industry after the 17 August 1999 catastrophic earthquake which left more than 18,000 casualties behind. In memory of the earthquake, the municipality had built a museum of earthquake in the city center.

== Education and culture ==
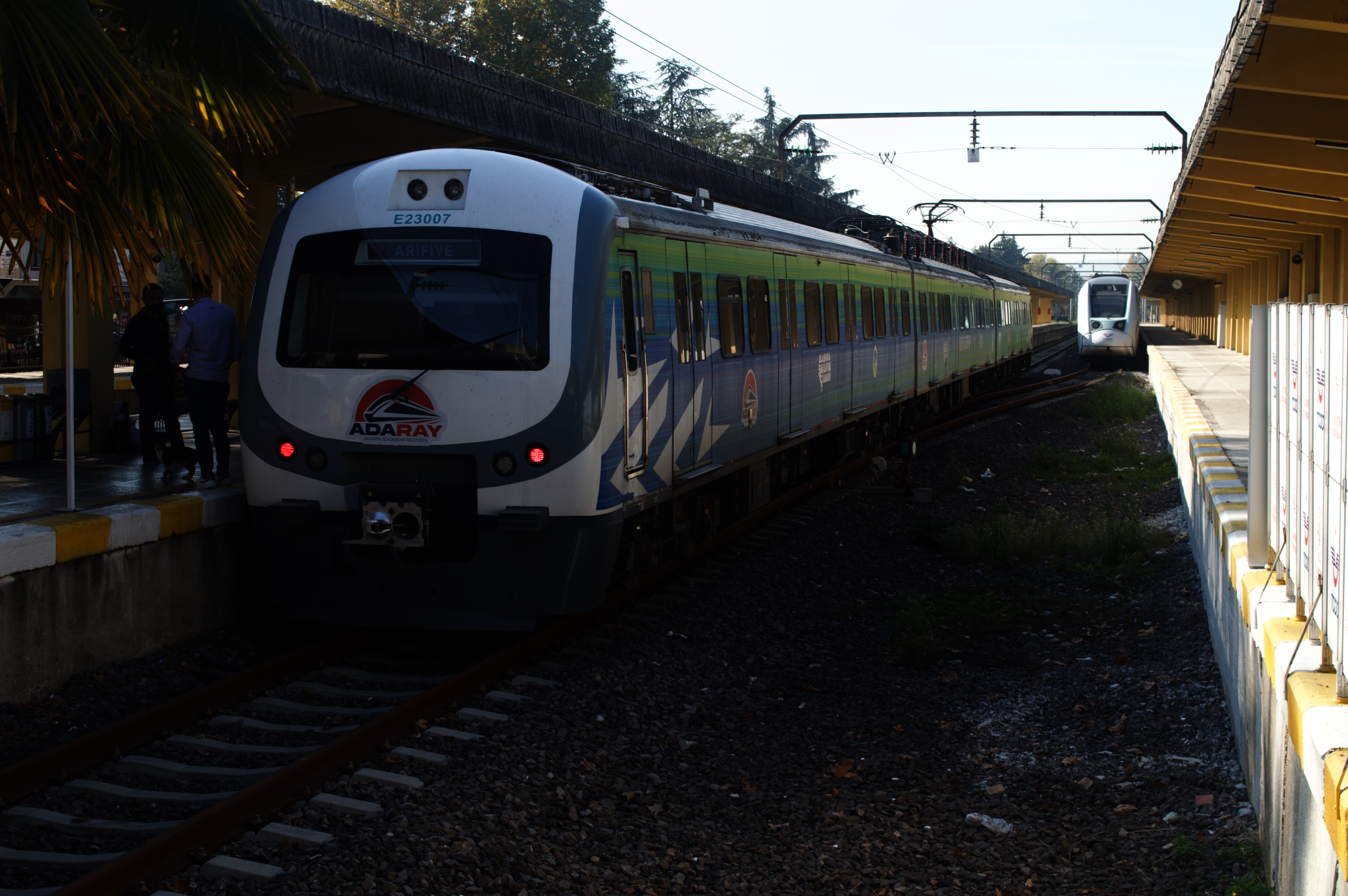
The TCDD E23000 Adaray in Adapazarı railway station.

The only university in the city is Sakarya University, one of the largest universities in Turkey in terms of student enrollment. Since its establishment in 1992, Sakarya University has influenced the culture of the city and transformed public life.

In addition to the university, many different institutions shape and influence the culture of the city. Adapazarı Kültür Merkezi (Adapazarı Culture Center), Ofis Sanat Merkezi (Ofis Art Center), and Sakarya Sanat Galerisi (Sakarya Art Gallery) are the main cultural institutions led by the municipality. Adapazari also hosts non-governmental cultural and educational organizations. Of them, Sakarya Bilgi Kültür Merkezi provides educational and cultural activities.

Kent Park features an authentic, picturesque reconstruction of an historic water wheel that once provided fresh drinking water from the Çark River to public spigots located every few blocks throughout the city. The original wooden water wheel, commonly known as the Çark Wheel, was maintained and refurbished to operate in one form or another from 1724 to 1955.

== Sports ==
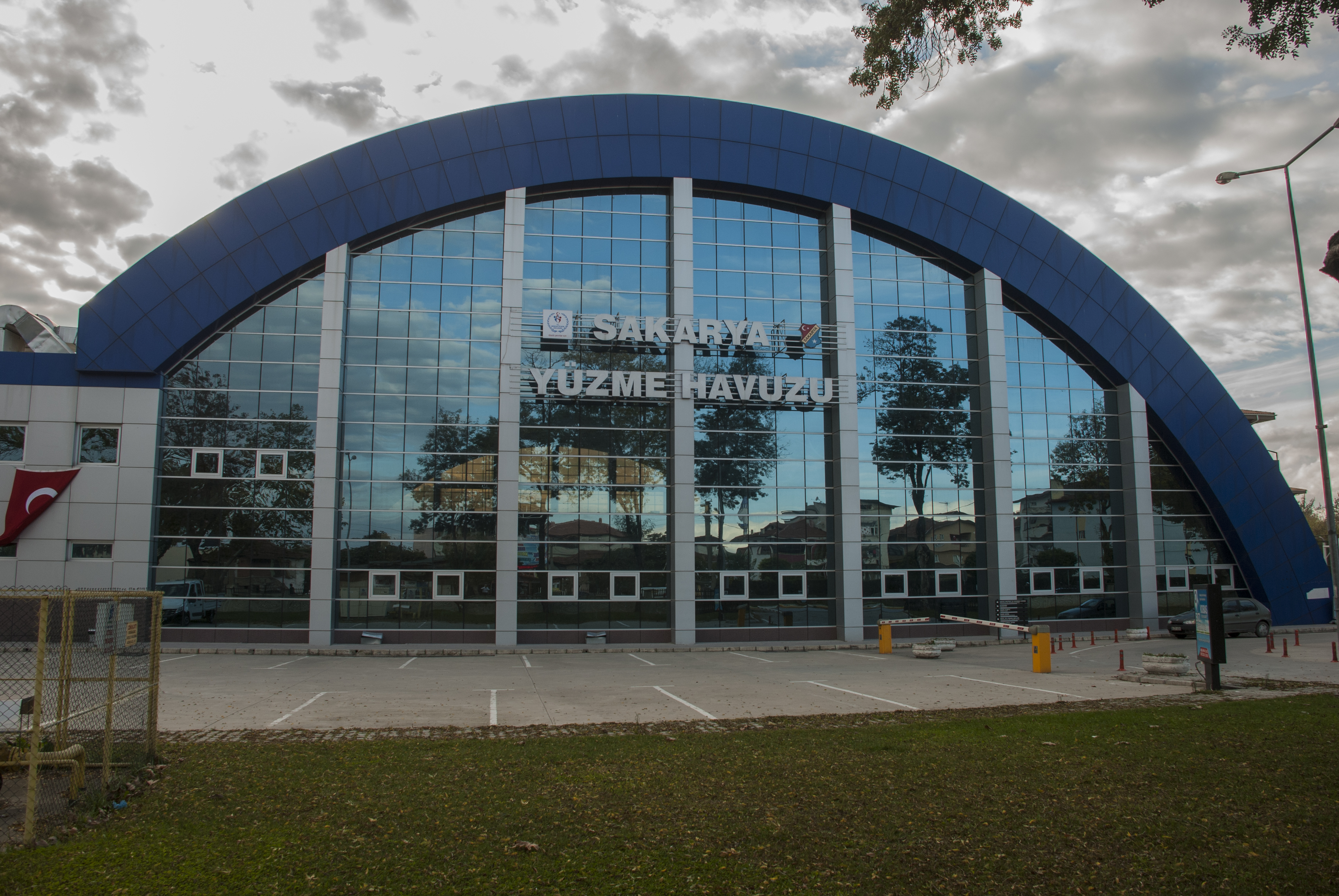
Sakarya Swimming Pool

Adapazarı is home to Sakaryaspor. Sakaryaspor has won the Turkish Cup once and has played in the Süper Lig for 11 seasons. They were promoted again to the TFF First League in 2011, the second level in the Turkish football pyramid, as they beat Konya Şeker S.K., Bugsaşspor and Bandırmaspor consecutively in the play-off games of the TFF Second League. However they were relegated in the following season, and since 2013 they have played in the TFF Third League. Even though Sakaryaspor is not always a permanent team in the Süper Lig, they have raised many of Turkey's best players, such as Hakan Şükür, Tuncay, Oğuz Çetin, Aykut Kocaman and many more.

== Composition ==
There are 84 neighbourhoods in Adapazarı District:

- 15 Temmuz Camili
- Abalı
- Acıelmalı
- Akıncılar
- Alandüzü
- Aşırlar
- Bağlar
- Bayraktar
- Bileciler
- Budaklar
- Büyükhataplı
- Çağlayan
- Çaltıcak
- Çamyolu
- Çelebiler
- Çerçiler
- Çökekler
- Çukurahmediye
- Cumhuriyet
- Dağdibi
- Demirbey
- Doğancılar
- Elmalı
- Evren
- Göktepe
- Güllük
- Hacılar
- Hacıramazanlar
- Harmantepe
- Hızırtepe
- İkizce Müslüm
- İkizce Osmaniye
- İlyaslar
- Işıklar
- İstiklal
- Karadavutlu
- Karadere
- Karakamış
- Karaköy
- Karaman
- Karaosman
- Karapınar
- Kasımlar
- Kavaklıorman
- Kayrancık
- Kışla
- Kömürlük
- Köprübaşı
- Korucuk
- Küçükhataplı
- Kurtbeyler
- Kurtuluş
- Mahmudiye
- Maltepe
- Merkez
- Mithatpaşa
- Nasuhlar
- Örentepe
- Orta
- Ozanlar
- Pabuççular
- Poyrazlar
- Rüstemler
- Sakarya
- Salmanlı
- Şeker
- Semerciler
- Şirinevler
- Solaklar
- Süleymanbey
- Taşkısığı
- Taşlık
- Tekeler
- Tepekum
- Tığcılar
- Turnadere
- Tuzla
- Yağcılar
- Yahyalar
- Yenicami
- Yenidoğan
- Yenigün
- Yenimahalle
- Yeşilyurt

== Climate ==
Adapazarı has a humid subtropical climate (Köppen: Cfa, Trewartha: Cf). Summers are hot and sometimes oppressively humid, the average maximum temperature is around 30 °C in July and August. Winters are cool and wet, the lowest average minimum temperature is slightly below 4 °C in January. Precipitation is plentiful, fairly evenly distributed year-round, and is most frequent in winter. Snowfall is somewhat common between the months of December and March, snowing for a week or two, and it can be heavy.

Highest recorded temperature:44.0 °C (111.2 °F) on 13 July 2000
Lowest recorded temperature:−14.5 °C (5.9 °F) on 22 January 1961

Climate data for Adapazarı (1991–2020, extremes 1951–2023)
Month	Jan	Feb	Mar	Apr	May	Jun	Jul	Aug	Sep	Oct	Nov	Dec	Year
Record high °C (°F)	25.8 (78.4)	28.7 (83.7)	31.9 (89.4)	35.8 (96.4)	38.0 (100.4)	40.4 (104.7)	44.0 (111.2)	41.8 (107.2)	40.7 (105.3)	38.6 (101.5)	30.2 (86.4)	28.5 (83.3)	44.0 (111.2)
Mean daily maximum °C (°F)	10.2 (50.4)	11.6 (52.9)	14.7 (58.5)	19.4 (66.9)	24.2 (75.6)	28.2 (82.8)	30.3 (86.5)	30.5 (86.9)	27.2 (81.0)	22.3 (72.1)	17.2 (63.0)	12.1 (53.8)	20.7 (69.3)
Daily mean °C (°F)	6.4 (43.5)	7.1 (44.8)	9.3 (48.7)	13.2 (55.8)	17.9 (64.2)	22.1 (71.8)	24.3 (75.7)	24.4 (75.9)	20.6 (69.1)	16.4 (61.5)	12.0 (53.6)	8.3 (46.9)	15.2 (59.4)
Mean daily minimum °C (°F)	3.5 (38.3)	3.7 (38.7)	5.2 (41.4)	8.5 (47.3)	13.0 (55.4)	16.9 (62.4)	19.1 (66.4)	19.4 (66.9)	15.7 (60.3)	12.3 (54.1)	8.0 (46.4)	5.3 (41.5)	10.9 (51.6)
Record low °C (°F)	−14.5 (5.9)	−13.5 (7.7)	−7.3 (18.9)	−2.4 (27.7)	2.0 (35.6)	6.1 (43.0)	8.7 (47.7)	7.8 (46.0)	5.4 (41.7)	−0.2 (31.6)	−6.6 (20.1)	−9.1 (15.6)	−14.5 (5.9)
Average precipitation mm (inches)	95.8 (3.77)	80.3 (3.16)	75.6 (2.98)	61.8 (2.43)	59.3 (2.33)	84.8 (3.34)	49.7 (1.96)	50.9 (2.00)	53.0 (2.09)	85.2 (3.35)	73.0 (2.87)	109.2 (4.30)	878.6 (34.59)
Average precipitation days	15.57	14.03	13.8	11.6	10.83	9.37	5.63	6.03	8.1	11.93	11.6	16.07	134.8
Average snowy days	4.9	2.6	1.4	0	0	0	0	0	0	0	0	1.8	10.7
Average relative humidity (%)	76.3	75.3	72.7	71.6	71.8	71.0	72.1	73.9	74.9	78.4	77.1	75.1	74.2
Mean monthly sunshine hours	77.5	93.2	124.0	165.0	204.6	243.0	275.9	263.5	204.0	145.7	108.0	77.5	1,981.9
Mean daily sunshine hours	2.5	3.3	4.0	5.5	6.6	8.1	8.9	8.5	6.8	4.7	3.6	2.5	5.4
Source 1: Turkish State Meteorological Service
Source 2: NOAA (humidity, 1991–2020), Meteomanz(snow days 2008-2023)

== Notable people ==
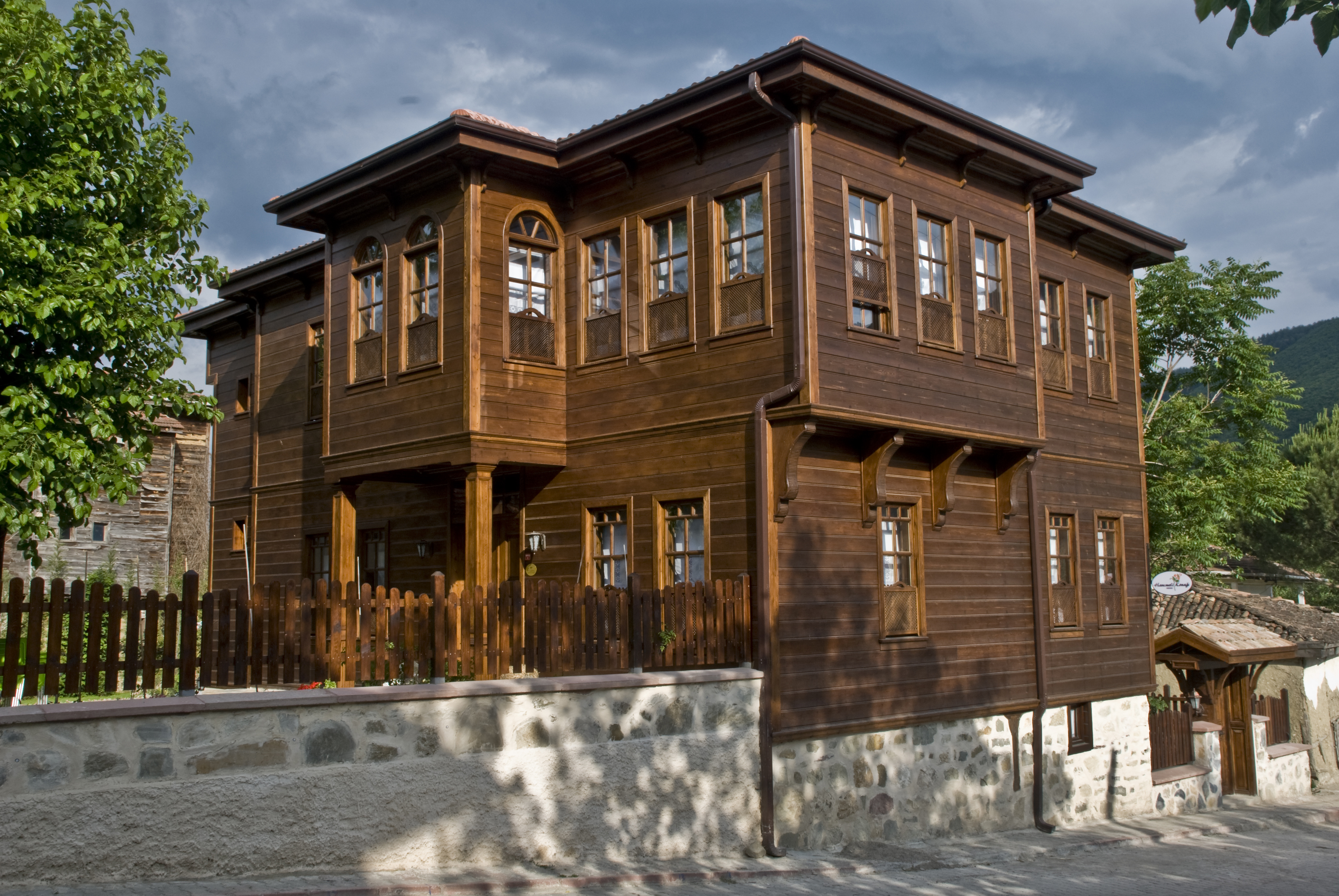
Sakarya Hanimeli Mansion

- Udi Hrant (1901–1978), oud player, singer and composer of Turkish and Armenian songs
- Kriton Ilyadis (1916–1980), cinematographer
- Sait Faik Abasıyanık, writer, poet
- Tuncay, footballer
- Hakan Şükür, footballer
- Semih Saygıner, carom billiards champion
- Kenan Sofuoğlu, motorcycle racer

== Twin towns – sister cities ==
Adapazarı is twinned with:

- Klina, Kosovo
- Louisville, United States
