= Porsuk railway station =

Railway station in Eskişehir Province, Turkey

PORSUK

General information
- Location: Kargın Mah. 06796; Odunpazarı, Eskişehir; Turkey
- Coordinates: 39.59859°N 30.27683°E
- System: TCDD Taşımacılık intercity and regional rail station
- Owner: Turkish State Railways
- Operator: TCDD Taşımacılık
- Line: İzmir Blue Train Pamukkale Express Eskişehir–Afyon Eskişehir–Tavşanlı Eskişehir–Kütahya
- Platforms: 2 side platforms
- Tracks: 3

Construction
- Parking: No
- Cycle facilities: No

History
- Electrified: 2014 (25 kV AC, 50 Hz)

Services
| Preceding station | TCDD Taşımacılık | Following station |
|---|---|---|
| Sabuncupınar towards İzmir (Basmane) | İzmir Blue Train | Gökçekısık towards Ankara |
| Sabuncupınar towards Denizli | Pamukkale Express | Gökçekısık towards Eskişehir |
| Sabuncupınar towards Afyon | Eskişehir–Afyon | Gökçekısık towards Eskişehir |
| Sabuncupınar towards Tavşanlı | Eskişehir–Tavşanlı | Gökçekısık towards Eskişehir |
| Sabuncupınar towards Kütahya | Eskişehir–Kütahya | Gökçekısık towards Eskişehir |
Location

Porsuk railway station (Turkish: Porsuk istasyonu) is a railway station near the village of Kargın in the Eskişehir Province. Due to its remote location, the station mainly serves as a siding to allow trains to pass one another. Porsuk station consists of two side platforms with three tracks. TCDD Taşımacılık operates two daily intercity trains to İzmir and Denizli, as well as three daily regional trains to Tavşanlı, Kütahya and Afyonkarahisar.
