= Gökçekısık railway station =

GÖKÇEKISIK
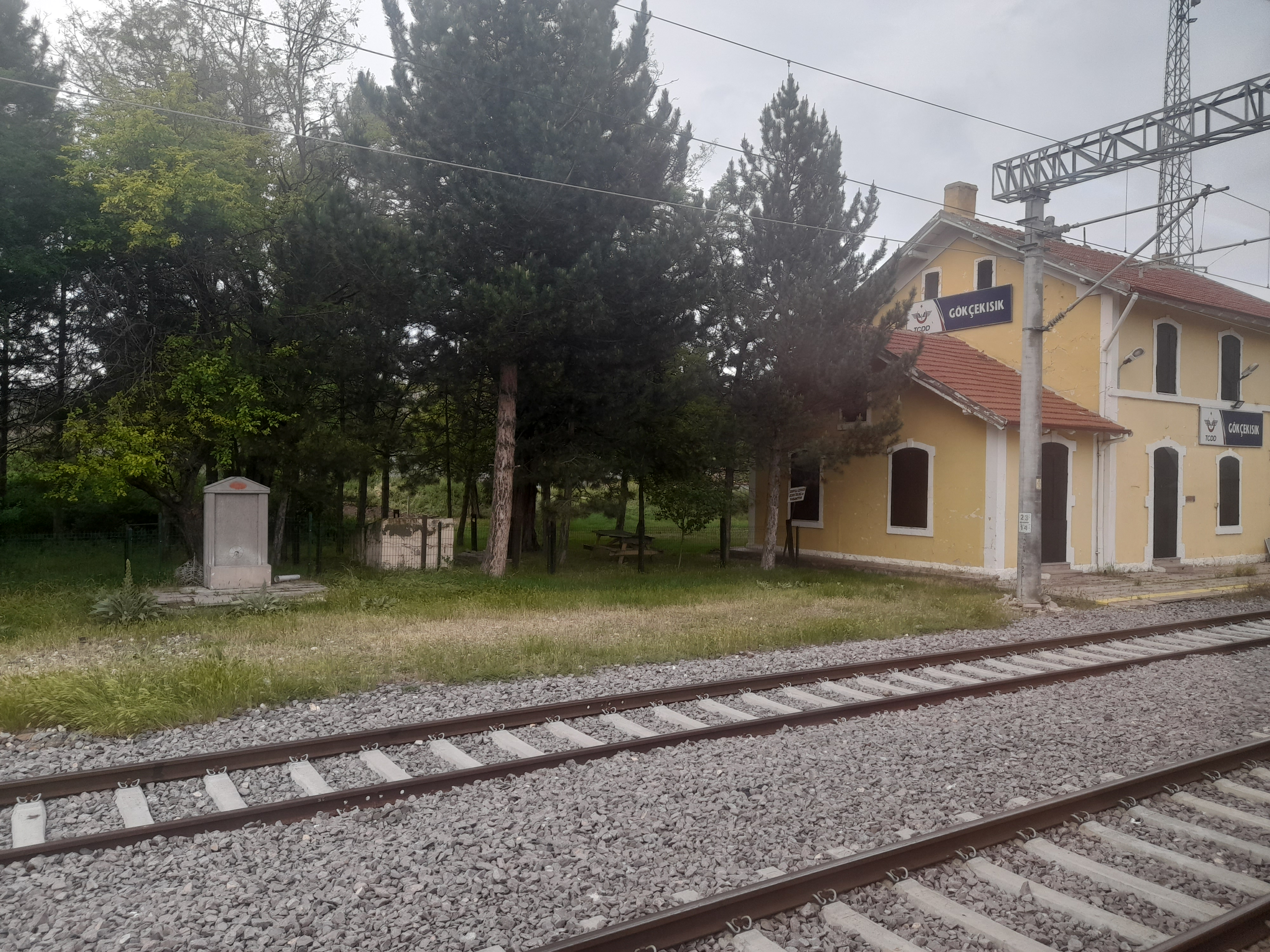
- Gökçekısık railway station

General information
- Location: Gökçekısık Mah. 26005; Tepebaşı/Eskişehir; Turkey
- Coordinates: 39.653923°N 30.387141°E
- System: TCDD intercity and regional rail station
- Owner: Turkish State Railways
- Operator: TCDD Taşımacılık
- Line: İzmir Blue Train Pamukkale Express Eskişehir–Tavşanlı Eskişehir–Kütahya Eskişehir–Afyon
- Platforms: 1 island platform
- Tracks: 2

Construction
- Structure type: At-grade
- Parking: None

History
- Opened: 30 December 1894

Services
Preceding station	TCDD Taşımacılık	Following station
Alayunt towards İzmir (Basmane)	İzmir Blue Train	Kızılinler towards Ankara
Porsuk towards Denizli	Pamukkale Express	Eskişehir Terminus
Porsuk towards Tavşanlı	Eskişehir–Tavşanlı	Kızılinler towards Eskişehir
Porsuk towards Kütahya	Eskişehir–Kütahya	Kızılinler towards Eskişehir
Porsuk towards Afyon	Eskişehir–Afyon	Kızılinler towards Eskişehir
Location

Gökçekısık station is a station near the village of Gökçekısık, Eskişehir in Turkey. Located about 1 km (0.62 mi) west of the village, the station is mainly used a siding to allow trains to pass since passenger traffic is low.

TCDD Taşımacılık operates five trains that stop at the station: the Izmir Blue Train, Pamukkale Express, Eskişehir-Tavşanlı Regional, Eskişehir-Kütahya Regional and the Eskişehir-Afyon Regional. Only the Izmir-bound Izmir Blue Train stops at the station while the Eskişehir-bound train does not.
