= Sabuncupınar railway station =

Railway station in Sabuncupınar, Kütahya Province, Turkey

SABUNCUPINAR
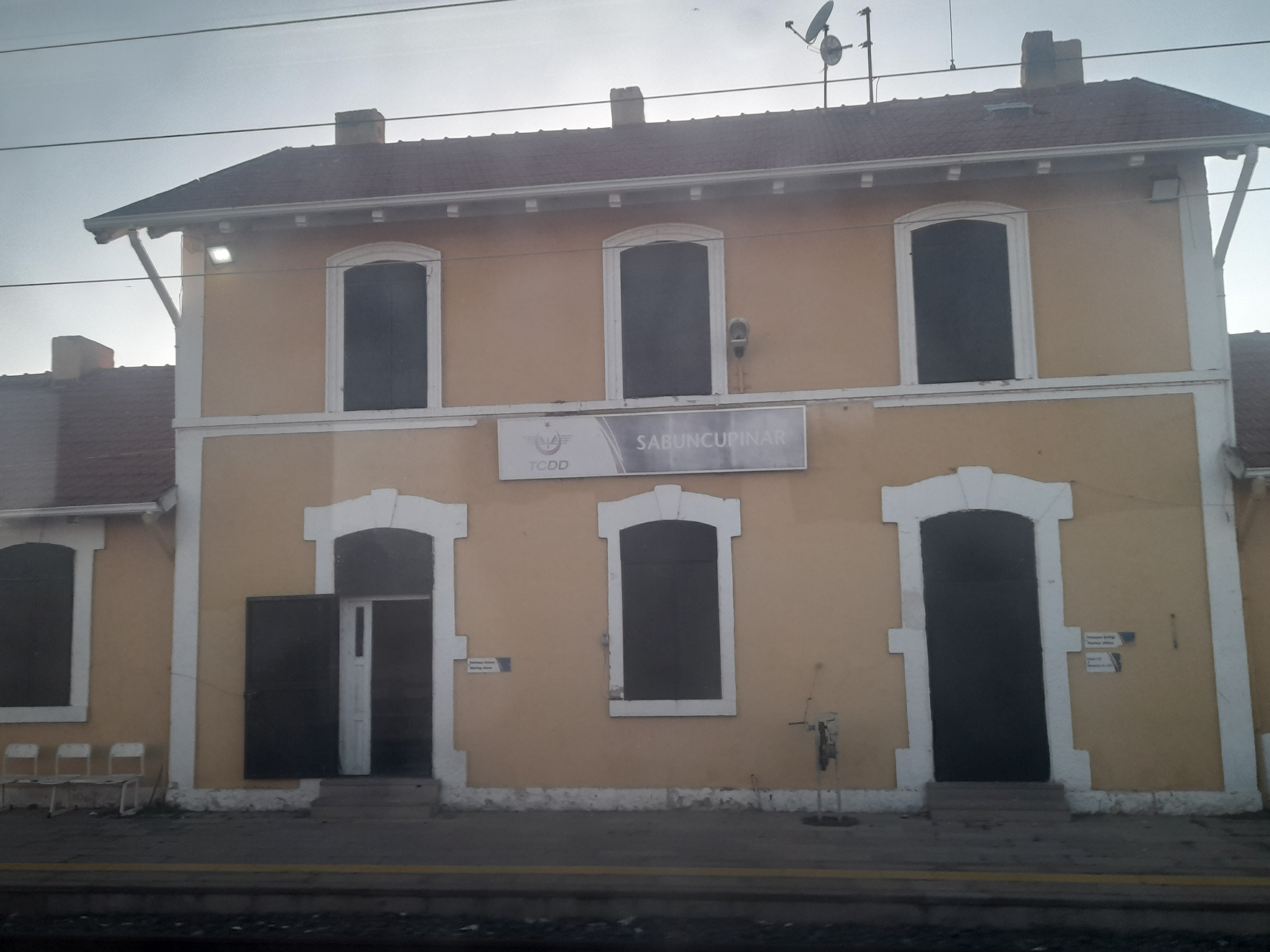

General information
- Location: Sabuncupınar Bucağı 43270; Kütahya Merkez, Kütahya; Turkey
- Coordinates: 39.5631°N 30.1907°E
- System: TCDD Taşımacılık intercity and regional rail station
- Owner: Turkish State Railways
- Operator: TCDD Taşımacılık
- Line: İzmir Blue Train Pamukkale Express Eskişehir–Afyon Eskişehir–Tavşanlı Eskişehir–Kütahya
- Platforms: 2 (1 side platform, 1 island platform)
- Tracks: 3

Construction
- Parking: No
- Cycle facilities: No

History
- Electrified: 2014 (25 kV AC, 50 Hz)

Services
Preceding station	TCDD Taşımacılık	Following station
Uluköy towards İzmir (Basmane)	İzmir Blue Train	Porsuk towards Ankara
Uluköy towards Denizli	Pamukkale Express	Porsuk towards Eskişehir
Alayunt towards Afyon	Eskişehir–Afyon	Porsuk towards Eskişehir
Uluköy towards Tavşanlı	Eskişehir–Tavşanlı	Porsuk towards Eskişehir
Uluköy towards Kütahya	Eskişehir–Kütahya	Porsuk towards Eskişehir
Location

Sabuncupınar railway station (Turkish: Sabuncupınar istasyonu) is a railway station in the village of Sabuncupınar in the Kütahya Province. Sabuncupınar station consists of a side platform and a narrow island platform, with three tracks. TCDD Taşımacılık operates two daily intercity trains to İzmir and Denizli, as well as three daily regional trains to Tavşanlı, Kütahya and Afyonkarahisar.
