= Kızılinler railway station =

KIZILİNLER

General information
- Location: Kızılinler Köyü, Tepebaşı 26005, Eskişehir
- Coordinates: 39.704075°N 30.417148°E
- System: TCDD inter-city and regional rail station
- Owner: Turkish State Railways
- Lines: İzmir Blue Train; Pamukkale Express; Eskişehir-Afyon Regional; Eskişehir-Kütahya Regional; Eskişehir-Tavşanlı Regional
- Platforms: 1
- Tracks: 1

History
- Opened: 30 December 1894
- Electrified: 2013

Services
Preceding station	TCDD Taşımacılık	Following station
Gökçekısık towards İzmir (Basmane)	İzmir Blue Train	Eskişehir towards Ankara
Gökçekısık towards Afyon	Eskişehir–Afyon	Eskişehir Terminus
Gökçekısık towards Kütahya	Eskişehir–Kütahya	Eskişehir Terminus
Gökçekısık towards Tavşanlı	Eskişehir–Tavşanlı	Eskişehir Terminus
Location

Kızılinler station is a small stop along the Eskişehir-Konya railway. Passenger traffic is very low and the station is mainly used as a siding to allow trains to pass one-another.
