= Chemins de fer Ottomans d'Anatolie =

Railway company that operated in the Ottoman Empire

Chemins de Fer Ottomans d'Anatolie Osmanlı Anadolu Demiryolları
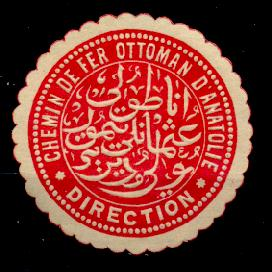

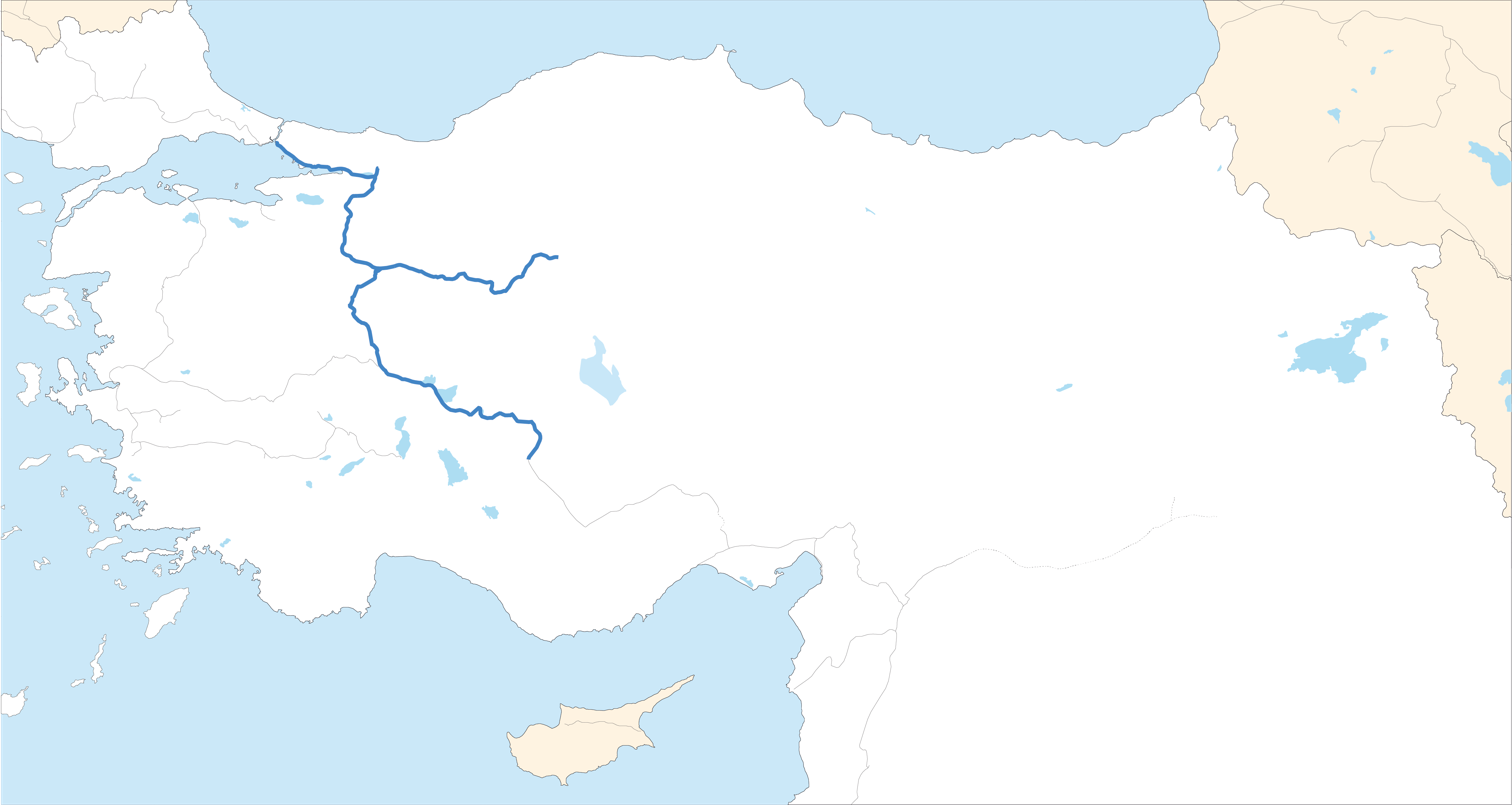
- Map of the CFOA system in 1912.

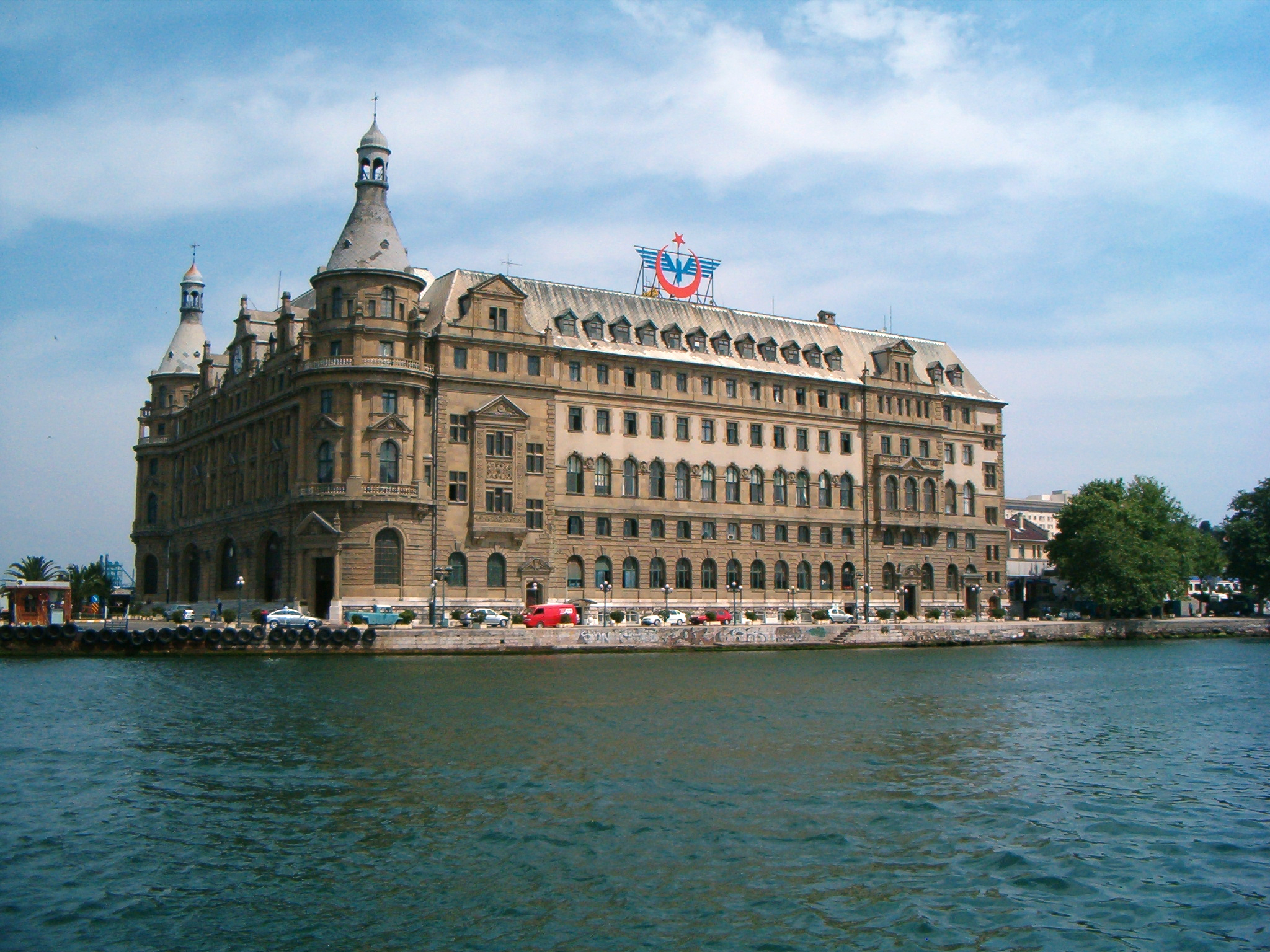
- Turkey's most famous railway station, Haydarpaşa station, was built and operated by the CFOA.

Overview
- Headquarters: Constantinople
- Reporting mark: CFOA
- Locale: Central Anatolia, Ankara to Istanbul, with branches to Adapazarı, Kütahya, and Konya
- Dates of operation: 1888–1924
- Successor: CFAB

Technical
- Track gauge: 1,435 mm (4 ft 8 1/2 in)
- Length: 1,023 km (636 mi)

The Chemins de Fer Ottomans d'Anatolie (Turkish: Osmanlı Anadolu Demiryolları, English: Anatolian Railway), founded on 4 October 1888, was a railway company that operated in the Ottoman Empire. The company was headquartered in Istanbul.

The CFOA was the busiest railway in the Ottoman Empire and was one of the two railways operating into Istanbul, along with the Chemins de fer Orientaux. The Baghdad Railway (Istanbul-Aleppo-Baghdad) connected with the CFOA at Konya to allow rail transport from Istanbul to the Middle East, although the Baghdad railway was not completed until 1940. The CFOA serviced major cities such as Istanbul, İzmit, Adapazarı, Bilecik, Eskişehir, Ankara, Kütahya and Konya. The railway also operated the Port of Haydarpaşa and the Port of Derince.

The railway was a wholly owned subsidiary of the Société du Chemin de fer Ottoman d'Anatolie, created on 8 October 1888 by the Deutsche Bank to operate the railway.

== History ==
=== Ottoman Government Railways (1871-1888) ===
The Ottoman Government, under the reign of Sultan Abdulaziz, started building a 1,435 mm (4 ft 8 1/2 in) standard gauge on the Asian side of Istanbul, from Haydarpaşa to Pendik in 1871. The line was opened on September 22, 1872. The railway was extended to Gebze, which opened on January 1, 1873. In August 1873 the railway opened to İzmit. The railway was built to serve a populated area along the Marmara Sea. The railway was then to be extended to Ankara and Mesopotamia. The line proved difficult to manage so in 1880, 60% ownership of the line was transferred to a British company. A 52.1 km (32.4 mi) 1,067 mm (3 ft 6 in) narrow gauge extension of the railway was built to Adapazarı the same year. The company could not finance the extension of the line to Ankara, so the company formed an Anglo-American syndicate under the leadership of Sir Vincent Caillard to complete the line. The syndicate still could not pull up the money needed to complete the line, so the company withdrew.

=== Chemins de Fer Ottoman d'Anatolie (1888-1927) ===
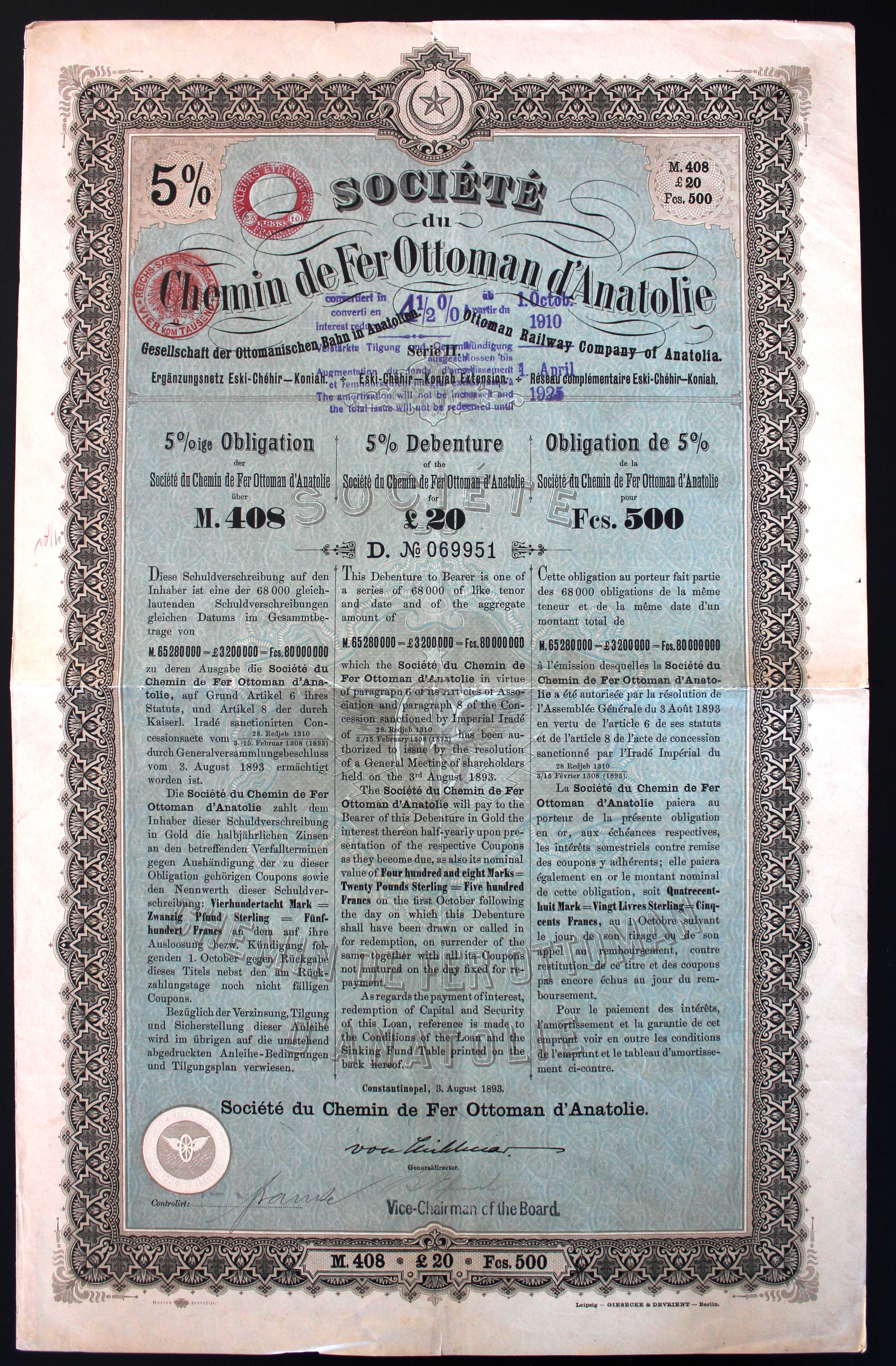
Bond of the Soc. du Chemin de Fer Ottoman d'Anatolie, issued 3. August 1893; the proceedings from this bond were used for building the Eskişehir-Konya extension.

A steam locomotive made by J. A. Maffei, Germany for the Anatolian Railway.

With the construction of the line to Ankara put on hold, the Ottoman government looked for a new company to build the line. Georg von Siemens, the managing director of the Deutsche Bank was informed on the project, as well as Alfred von Kaulla, who was in Istanbul to handle the export of the Mauser rifle to the Ottoman Army. After some tension, the Deutsche Bank won the concession to build the line. The original concession was for 99 years, which later became 114 years to match the Baghdad Railway. The Deutsche Bank created a subsidiary company, Société du Chemin de fer Ottoman d'Anatolie that was incorporated on October 4, 1888, as the parent company of the railway. The CFOA subcontracted the building of the line to Philipp Holzmann. The CFOA started building the line to Ankara in May 1889. The CFOA completed the line to Arifye in 1890 and opened it on September 1, 1891. The line was opened to Ankara on December 31, 1892. In 1893 the Ottoman government granted the CFOA with a concession to build a line from Eskişehir to Konya. The line was to branch from the Istanbul–Ankara main line at Eskişehir, to Alayunt, Afyon, Akşehir and Konya. A branch line from Alayunt to Kütahya was also to be built. The line was opened to Alayunt and Kütahya on December 30, 1894. The CFOA opened the line to Afyon on August 4, 1895, and Konya on July 25, 1896. In 1899, the CFOA was granted another concession to build a line to Bolu and later İsmetpaşa. The CFOA started construction and on November 1, 1899, opened a 3.2 km (2.0 mi) branch line from Arifye to Adapazarı. However, the tracks never reached Bolu. In 1904 the Baghdad Railway was incorporated to continue the line from Konya, through Adana and Aleppo to Baghdad. This would provide a direct rail link between Istanbul and Baghdad. However World War I halted the construction of the line. The Ottoman Empire joined with the Central Powers against the Allied Powers. Non-German owned railways in the Empire were placed under Turkish military administration, but the CFOA, being mostly German owned, was unaffected except that civilian passenger traffic was suspended. It played a vital role carrying war materials to the fronts in Palestine and Mesopotamia, with Germany supplying a large number of locomotives and wagons. After the end of the war and the Dissolution of the Ottoman Empire, the CFOA came under British military control. On 22 February 1920 British authorities handed control of most of the railway to Atatürk's Turkish nationalist government in Ankara, but in 1921 the majority of the line was lost by the nationalists to Greek forces. After the Greek defeat at Sakarya, they destroyed much of the railway's infrastructure as they retreated back to the coast. The CFOA was under full Turkish control by September 1923 and the war against Greece ended a month later. Despite being in control, the Turkish government was not the legal owner of the CFOA due to the company being headquartered in Switzerland, a neutral country in the war. On March 3, 1924, the Chemins de fer d'Anatolie Baghdad was created to operate CFOA lines until the Turkish government nationalized the line. The CFOA was absorbed completely by the CFAB, later TCDD on June 1, 1927.

== Operations ==
=== Passenger Service ===
The CFOA operated many passenger trains on their lines. Their main line was between Istanbul and İzmit. The CFOA also operated the first passenger train between Istanbul and Ankara; this was a daily train that entered service in 1892. The most common steam locomotives for passenger trains were the class 33001.

=== Freight Service ===
The CFOA's primary operation were freight trains. The CFOA mainly focused on transporting grain from central Anatolia to the ports in Istanbul. The CFOA also played a big role in the construction of the Baghdad Railway, by transporting goods from Istanbul to Konya to help built the tracks. The CFOA owned and operated 2 major ports; the Port of Haydarpaşa and the Port of Derince. Most freight trains would load or unload at these ports.

=== Ports ===
The CFOA operated ports along with railways. Their main port was the Port of Haydarpaşa in Istanbul. This port exported most of the goods transported by the railway. With the heavy usage of the port, the equipment wasn't enough to support the traffic. The CFOA had difficulties to extend the port, so in 1897, the railway built a new port in Derince near İzmit. This port had a grain elevator to export grain from central Anatolia. The port of Haydarpaşa was finally extended in 1899. The Turkish State Railways acquired the ports in 1927.

== Timeline ==
- 1871 - Construction of a railway line from Kadıköy to Pendik, in Istanbul begins.
- 1872 - The railway from Kadıköy to Pendik is completed and opened on September 22.
- 1873
  - January 1 - The railway is extended to Gebze
  - August 1 - The railway is completed to İzmit
- 1880 - A British company starts to finance the railway and is taken over from the Ottoman government.
- 1888 - The construction of the railway was transferred to the Deutsche Bank to build the line to Ankara.
- 1890 - İzmit - Arifye section is completed.
- 1891 - The railway opens to Arifye on September 1.
- 1892 - The railway is completed to Ankara and opens on December 31.
- 1893 - A concession is awarded to build a branch line from Eskişehir to Konya.
- 1894 - Eskişehir - Alayunt and Alayunt - Kütahya branches are completed and opened on December 30.
- 1895 - Alayunt - Afyon section opens.
- 1896 - The railway to Konya is completed and opened on July 29.
- 1897 - The Port of Derince is inaugurated.
- 1899 - Branch from Arifye is opened to Adapazarı.
- 1914 - World War I begins.
- 1918 - World War I ends, the Allies begin to occupy Anatolia; CFOA put under British military control.
- 1920 - The Turkish nationalists take over the Ankara - Konya portion of the line and start to use it against the Greek military, during the Greco-Turkish War.
- 1923 - Treaty of Lausanne is signed, Allies are forced to leave Anatolia, railway is given back to Turkey.
- 1924 - The holding company, Chemins de fer d'Anatolie Baghdad is created to operate the railway.
- 1927 - The CFOA is officially absorbed by the Turkish State Railways.

== Railway Stations ==
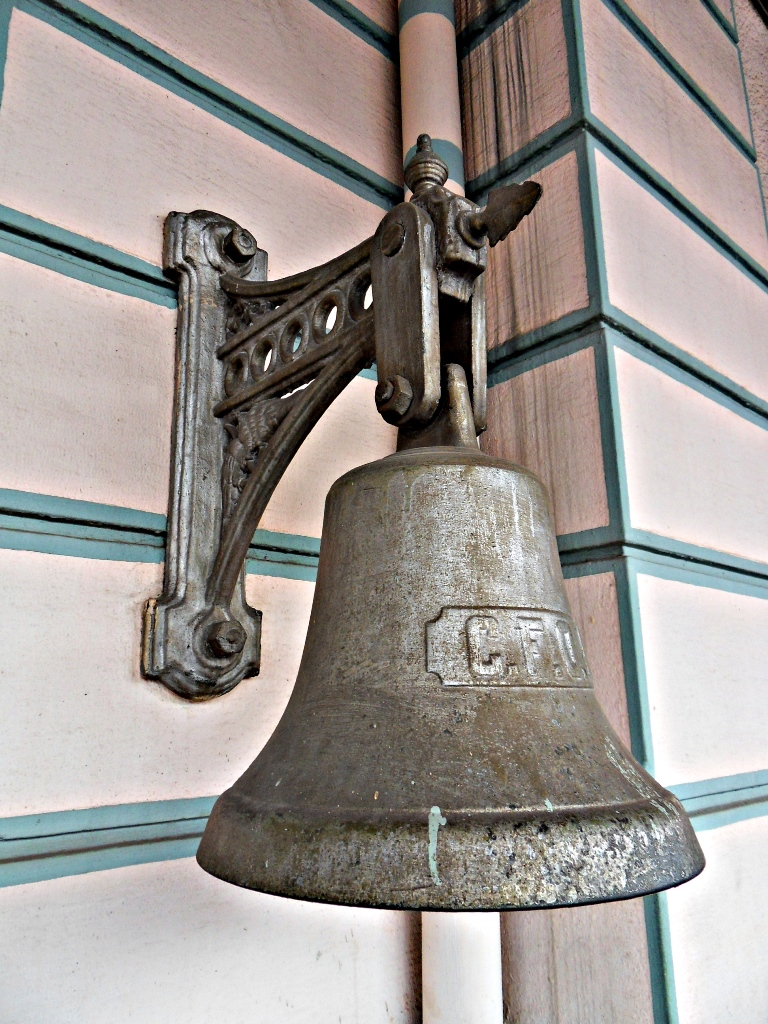
CFOA bell in Bostancı train station.

The CFOA built and owned many railway stations. The main stations notable are:

- Haydarpaşa station, Istanbul
- İzmit station, İzmit
- Adapazarı station, Adapazarı
- Bilecik station, Bilecik
- Eskişehir station, Eskişehir
- Ankara station, Ankara
- Kütahya station, Kütahya
- Konya station, Konya
