= 2026 dockworker strike =

International labor strike

On 30 October 2026, multiple dockworker labor unions went on strike in protest of arms shipments and for improvements in working conditions. Strikes took place in 22 countries, affecting major shipping hubs such as the Port of Piraeus in Greece, Tanger Med in Morocco, and Jawaharlal Nehru Port in India.

== Background ==
In May 2026, European dockworkers' unions issued the Istanbul Declaration, demanding that ports should not handle weapons shipments destined for active wars. Seafarers have been killed in attacks against commercial shipping due to the Russian invasion of Ukraine and the 2026 Iran war, with more stranded due to blockades. The Indian WTWFI union stated that about 15 Indian seafarers have been killed during the Iran war.

== Strike and impact ==
A 24-hour strike beginning on 30 October was originally called for by dockworkers' unions in Italy, France, Turkey, Morocco, and the Basque Country in Spain, led by the European Dockworkers Council. Other unions from outside Europe joined the call for a strike. Unions called for an end to wars in the Middle East, including the Gaza war. A total of 25 unions in 113 ports joined in support of the strike.

In France, around 14,000 port workers were affected by the strike call. The CGT Port and Docks union issued the strike call in protest against the French government's draft budget. In Genoa, Italy, the strike was led by the Union of Base Trade Unions. Dockworkers and students blocked the entrance to the Port of Genoa, while demonstrations occurred in major cities denouncing increases in military spending. In Turkey, protestors gathered around the Port of Haydarpaşa under anti-war banners. About 5,000 dockworkers in India responded to calls to demonstrations.

The impact of the strike on global supply chains was limited.
