= Zigra =

Zigra may refer to:

- Zığra, a village in the Kütahya Province of Turkey
- Gamera vs. Zigra, a 1971 Japanese film.
