= Haydarpaşa Cemetery =

Haydarpaşa İngiliz Mezarlığı
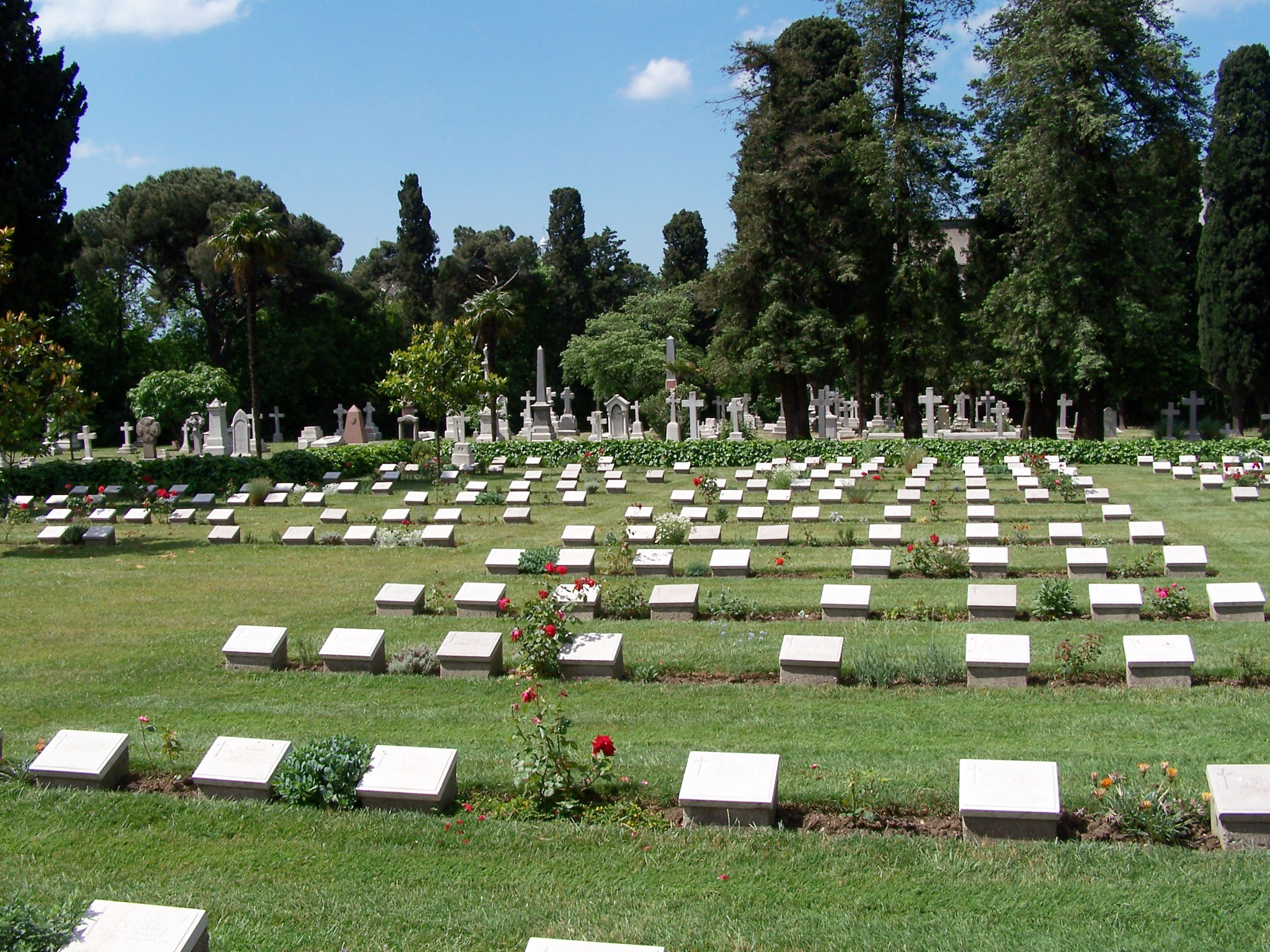
- Military graves in the front row with civil burials in the background
- Interactive map of Haydarpaşa İngiliz Mezarlığı

Details
- Established: 1855
- Location: Haydarpaşa, Istanbul
- Country: Turkey
- Coordinates: 41°00′00″N 29°01′10″E
- Type: Military and civil British nationals
- Website: Cemetery details. Commonwealth War Graves Commission.
- Find a Grave: Haydarpaşa İngiliz Mezarlığı

Haydarpaşa Cemetery, also known as Haidar Pasha Cemetery, Istanbul, (Turkish: Haydarpaşa İngiliz Mezarlığı), located in the Haydarpaşa neighborhood of Üsküdar district in the Asian part of Istanbul, Turkey, is a burial ground established initially for British military personnel who took part in the Crimean War (1854–1856). The cemetery also contains graves of Commonwealth soldiers from the two World Wars, and civilians of British nationality.

== Crimean War graves ==
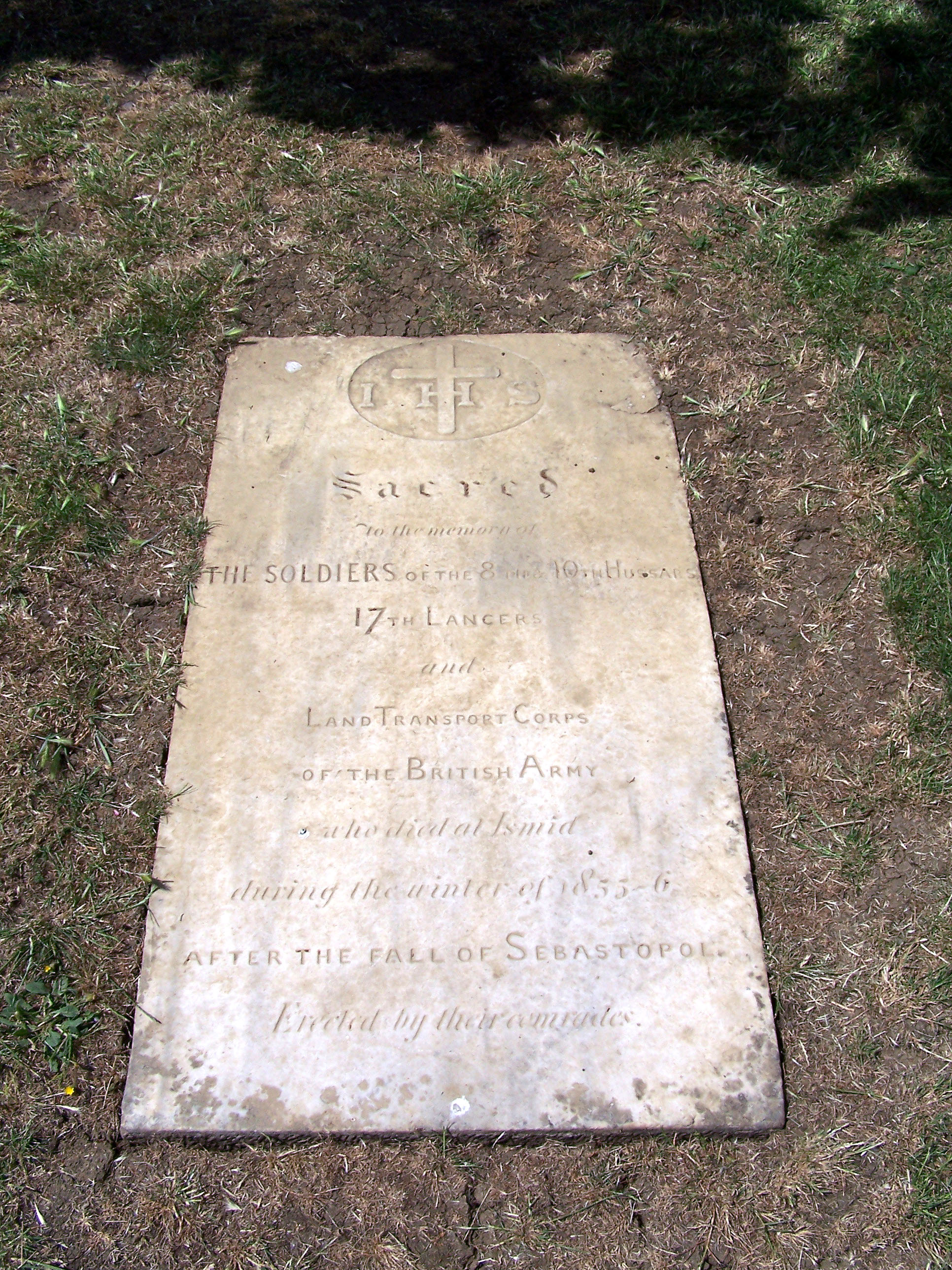
Grave of British soldiers who died in Crimean War

The cemetery was first established for British soldiers from the Crimean War, who died mostly as the result of a cholera epidemic in the first organized military hospital in modern history created by Florence Nightingale. On the 16th of May 1855, the burial ground was consecrated by the Bishop of Gibraltar according to the rites of the Church of England, in the presence of Lord Stratford de Redcliffe. Around 6,000 soldiers died during the war in the Selimiye Barracks (a.k.a. Scutari Barracks) in Istanbul, which was converted into a military hospital. The graves of the dead, of which only a few are marked today, were placed at two separate plots on a hillside close to the Sea of Marmara next to the military hospital. The land, formerly owned by Sultan Suleiman the Magnificent (1495–1566), was donated to the British Government in 1855. The two plots were linked in 1867 by a second land grant.

An obelisk was erected in 1857 by Queen Victoria (1819–1901) within the cemetery to commemorate the British soldiers from the Crimean War. A bronze plaque, attached by the British community in Turkey on the plinth of the Crimean Memorial and unveiled on Empire Day, 1954, to celebrate the 100th anniversary of Florence Nightingale’s nursing service in this region, bears the inscription:

"To Florence Nightingale, whose work near this Cemetery a century ago relieved much human suffering and laid the foundations for the nursing profession."

Other monuments in the cemetery include a symbolic broken column in memorial of German Jäger officers who fell in the Crimea, and a British memorial, which was erected in 1855 initially in the Therapia Crimean Cemetery (today Tarabya in the European part of Istanbul), and later transferred here together with the graves of 18 personnel of the Royal Navy and Royal Marines who died in the sultan’s mansion in Therapia, which had been converted into a military hospital.

== Civilian burials ==
Since 1867, more than 700 civilians are interred in a separate section within the cemetery. Among them is the grave of Sir Edward Barton, British ambassador of Queen Elizabeth I (1533–1603) to the Sublime Porte between 1588 and 1596, who died in 1598 on the island of Heybeliada in the Sea of Marmara, and his remains were transferred later here. A chapel in memory of Sir Nicholas O’Conor-Don, British ambassador to the Ottoman Empire from 1898 to 1908, is another historic monument in this plot.

Some military graves outside of the World War periods are also located in this section.

== World War graves ==
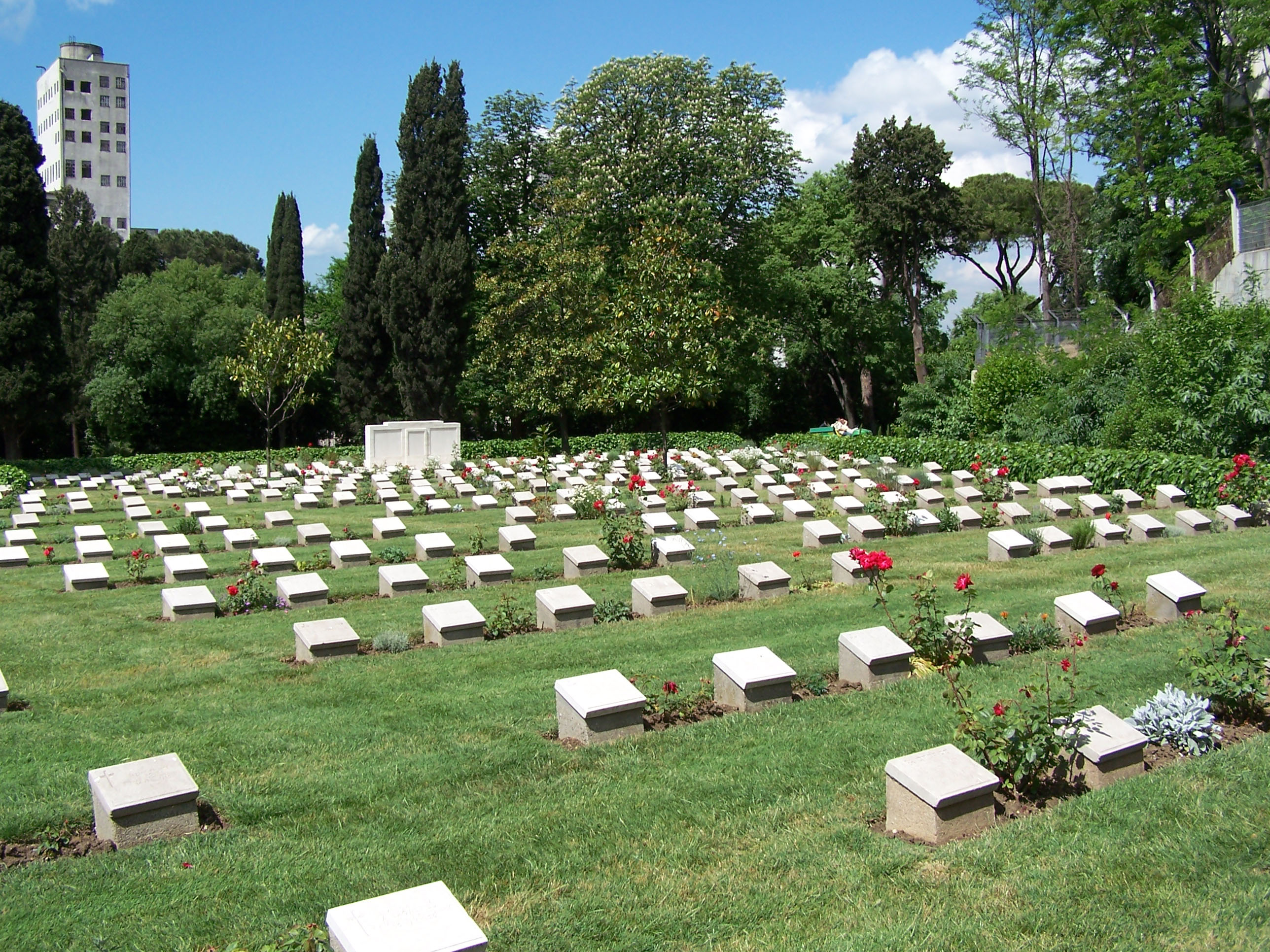
Pedestal markers of First World War military graves in the cemetery

There are just over 400 graves of military personnel from World War I, who died in Turkey mostly as prisoners of war or some during the occupation of Istanbul (1918 to 1923) after the Armistice of Mudros.

Two other memorials of World War I are found in the cemetery, one bearing the names of a little over 200 soldiers of United Kingdom and India, who fell in various parts of Russia or on the borders of Turkey, and whose burial grounds could not be maintained. The other memorial is dedicated to the servicemen of the Indian Army who died between 1919 and 1920 in the prisoner-of-war camps in southern Turkey near Adana and were interred in the Maslak and Osmaniye Indian Cemeteries. In 1961, when those cemeteries could not be further maintained, the earth with the ashes of the cremated remains of these men was transferred here and scattered near the monument, and the remains of their Muslim comrades were re-interred.

In addition to the burials of World War I, graves of 38 servicemen of the Royal Navy and Royal Air Force and one pilot of the Australian Imperial Force, who were all killed in action in the Mediterranean Theatre of World War II at the borders of then neutral Turkey, are found in the Haydarpaşa Cemetery.

== Notable burials ==
- James Maurice Frost (1838–1902), Ottoman-Scottish inventor, brigadier general, and military engineer
- Marian Langiewicz (1827–1887), Polish military leader of the January Uprising and later an Ottoman Pasha.

== Administration ==
Until 1925, the British Government was directly responsible for the maintenance of the cemetery. From then on, the Commonwealth War Graves Commission has taken over the duty on behalf of the British Government.

== Location ==
The cemetery is situated today between the military hospital and the Port of Haydarpaşa next to the marshalling yard down on the street Tıbbiye Caddesi from Üsküdar to Kadıköy.
