= Zığra =

- Neighbourhood
- Location in Turkey Zığra (Turkey Aegean)
- Coordinates: 39.4082°N 30.0464°E
- Country: Turkey
- Province: Kütahya
- District: Kütahya
- Municipality: Kütahya

Government
  - Muhtar: Kadir Yeşildağ
- Area: 0.18 km^{2} (0.07 sq mi)
- Elevation: 927 m (3,041 ft)
- Population (2022): 3,416
  - Density: 19,000/km^{2} (49,000/sq mi)
- Time zone: UTC+3 (TRT)
- Postal code: 43277
- Area code: 0274

Zığra is a neighbourhood of the city Kütahya, Kütahya District, Kütahya Province, Turkey. Its population is 3,416 (2022). It is located just northeast of the city of Kütahya. The main road in and out of the village is Alayunt Street, which starts in Kütahya and runs east, through Zığra, to Alayunt. Although a double-track railway runs through the village, Zığra does not have a railway station.

The muhtar of Zığra is Kadir Yeşildağ.
