= Eskişehir railway station =

Railway station in Turkey

Eskişehir
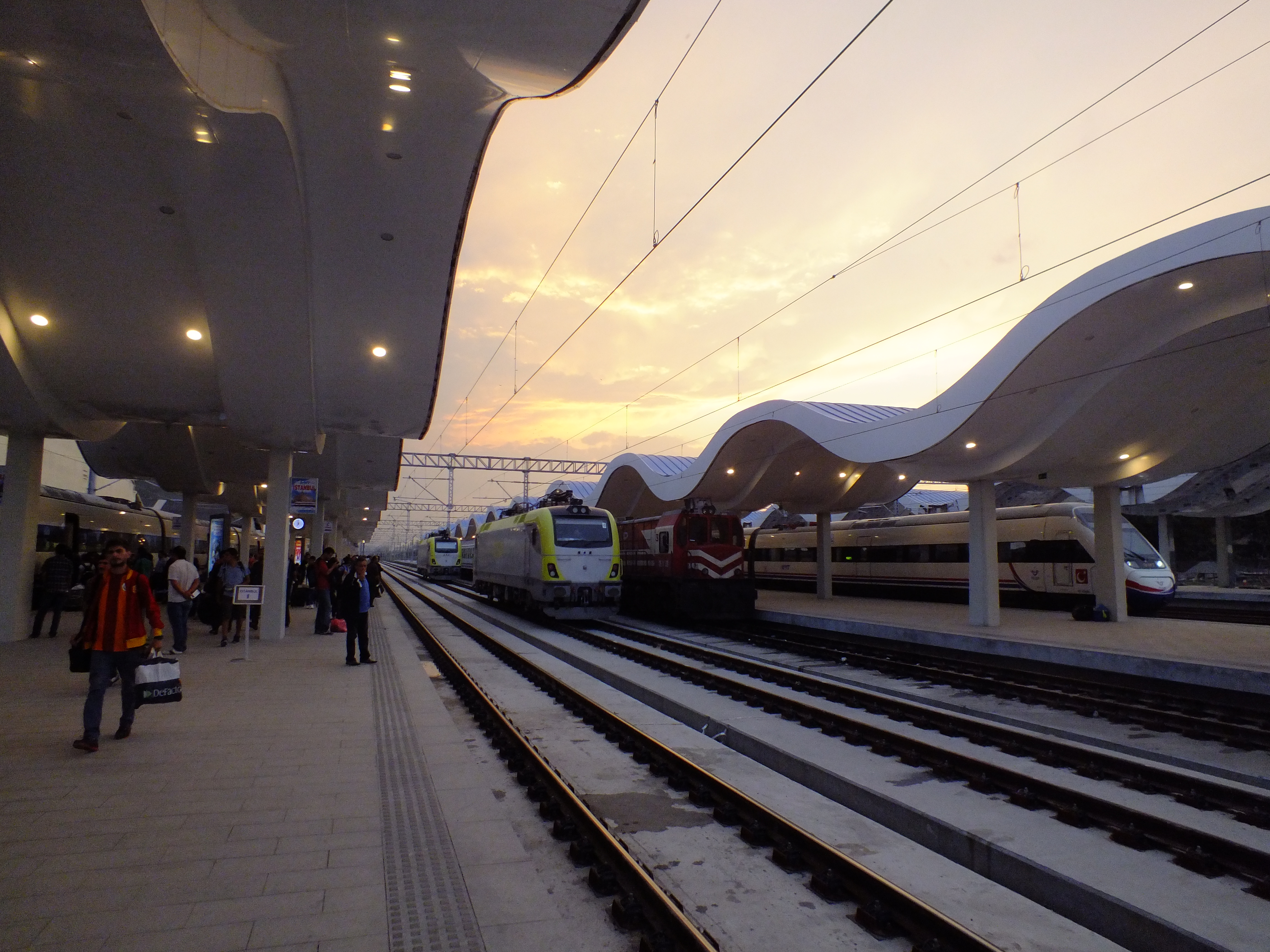
- The rebuilt station platforms.

General information
- Location: Hoşnudiye Mah., İstasyon Cd. 10, 26130 Tepebaşı/Eskişehir, Turkey
- Coordinates: 39.7794°N 30.5078°E
- System: TCDD Taşımacılık high-speed, inter-city and regional rail station
- Owner: TCDD
- Lines: Istanbul–Ankara railway Ankara–Istanbul high-speed railway Eskişehir-Konya railway
- Platforms: 4 (2 side platforms, 2 island platforms)
- Tracks: 10
- Connections: Eskişehir Belediye Bus, Estram

Construction
- Structure type: At-Grade
- Parking: Yes
- Architect: Orhan Safa

Other information
- Station code: 2435

History
- Opened: 31 December 1892
- Rebuilt: 1955 (Station building); 2014 (YHT station)
- Electrified: 1989 (25 kV AC)

Services
Preceding station	TCDD Taşımacılık	Following station
Bozüyük towards Istanbul Halkalı	Yüksek Hızlı Tren	Polatlı YHT towards Ankara
Bozüyük towards Istanbul Halkalı	Yüksek Hızlı Tren	Selçuklu YHT towards Karaman
Bozüyük towards Istanbul Halkalı	Ankara Express	Polatlı towards Ankara
Sabuncupınar towards İzmir (Basmane)	İzmir Blue Train	Alpu towards Ankara
Kızılinler towards İzmir (Basmane)	Aegean Express	Terminus
Gökçekısık towards Denizli	Pamukkale Express	Terminus
Kızılinler towards Afyon	Eskişehir–Afyon	Terminus
Kızılinler towards Kütahya	Eskişehir–Kütahya	Terminus
Kızılinler towards Tavşanlı	Eskişehir–Tavşanlı	Terminus
Former services
Preceding station	Turkish State Railways	Following station
Bozüyük towards Istanbul	Capital Express	Polatlı towards Ankara
Bozüyük towards Istanbul	Republic Express	Polatlı towards Ankara
Bozüyük towards Istanbul	Fatih Express	Polatlı towards Ankara
İnönü towards Istanbul	Anatolian Express	Polatlı towards Ankara
İnönü towards Istanbul	Ankara Express	Polatlı towards Ankara
Bozüyük towards Arifiye	Boğaziçi Express	Alpu towards Ankara
Bilecik towards Istanbul	Eskişehir Express	Terminus
Bilecik towards Istanbul	Sakarya Express	Terminus
Location

Eskişehir railway station (Turkish: Eskişehir garı) is the main railway station in Eskişehir, Turkey. The station is part of a major railway facility, which is one of the largest in the country. Prior to the cancellation of all non-high-speed trains between Ankara and Istanbul, Eskişehir station was one of the busiest stations in Turkey. Eskişehir is served by high-speed trains on the Ankara–Istanbul line. Due to its geographical location, the city is an important railway junction, where two main lines meet. The largest railway factory in Turkey, owned by TÜLOMSAŞ, is located next to the station as well as serving as the headquarters for the company.

Eskişehir railway station is located towards the northwestern part of the city center. Estram tram lines serve the station with a direct link the heart of the cities as well as the main north and south districts.

The station was built in 1891 by the Anatolian Railway and officially opened on 31 December 1892.

== History ==
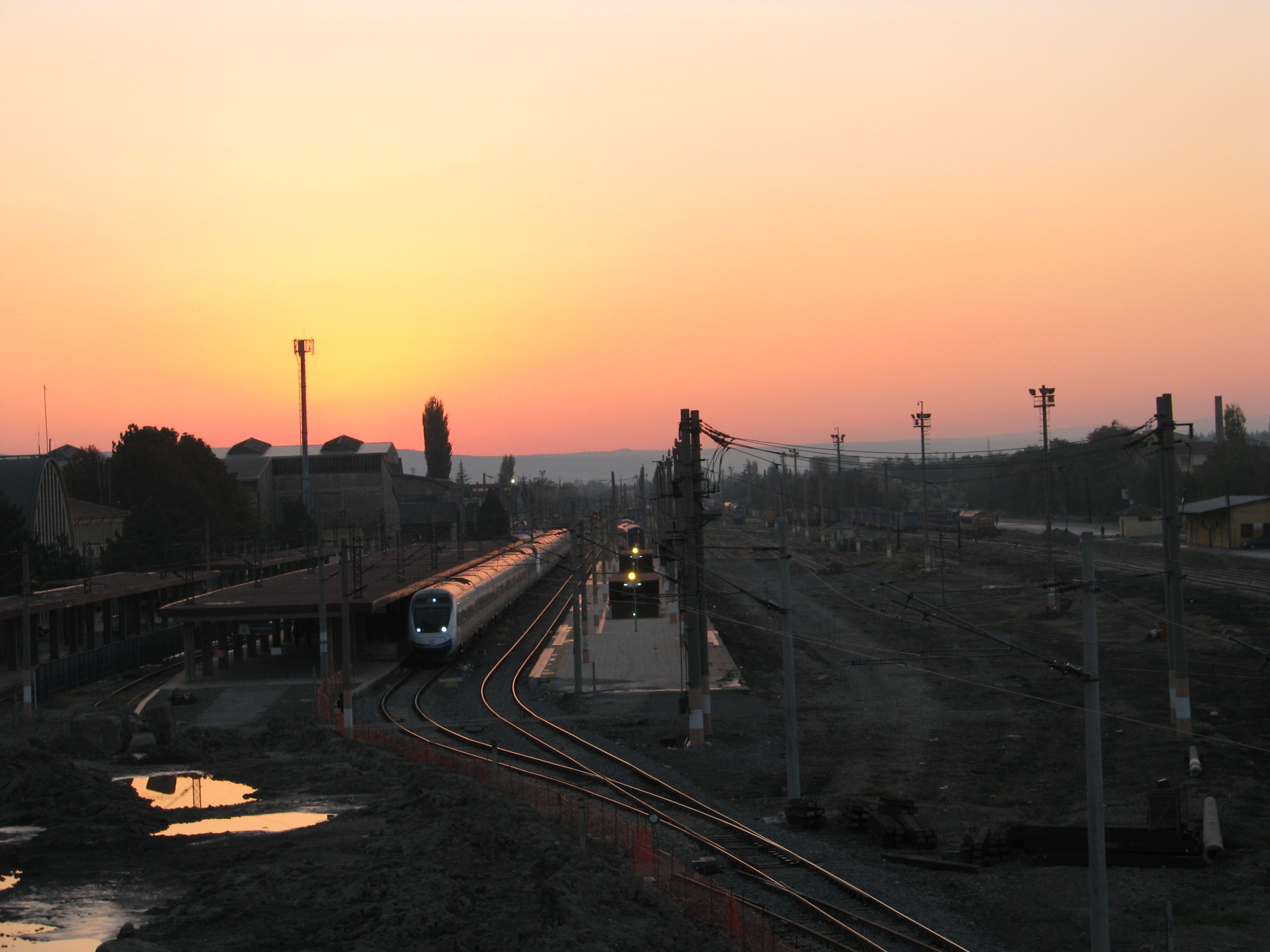
Reconstruction of the station in 2012.

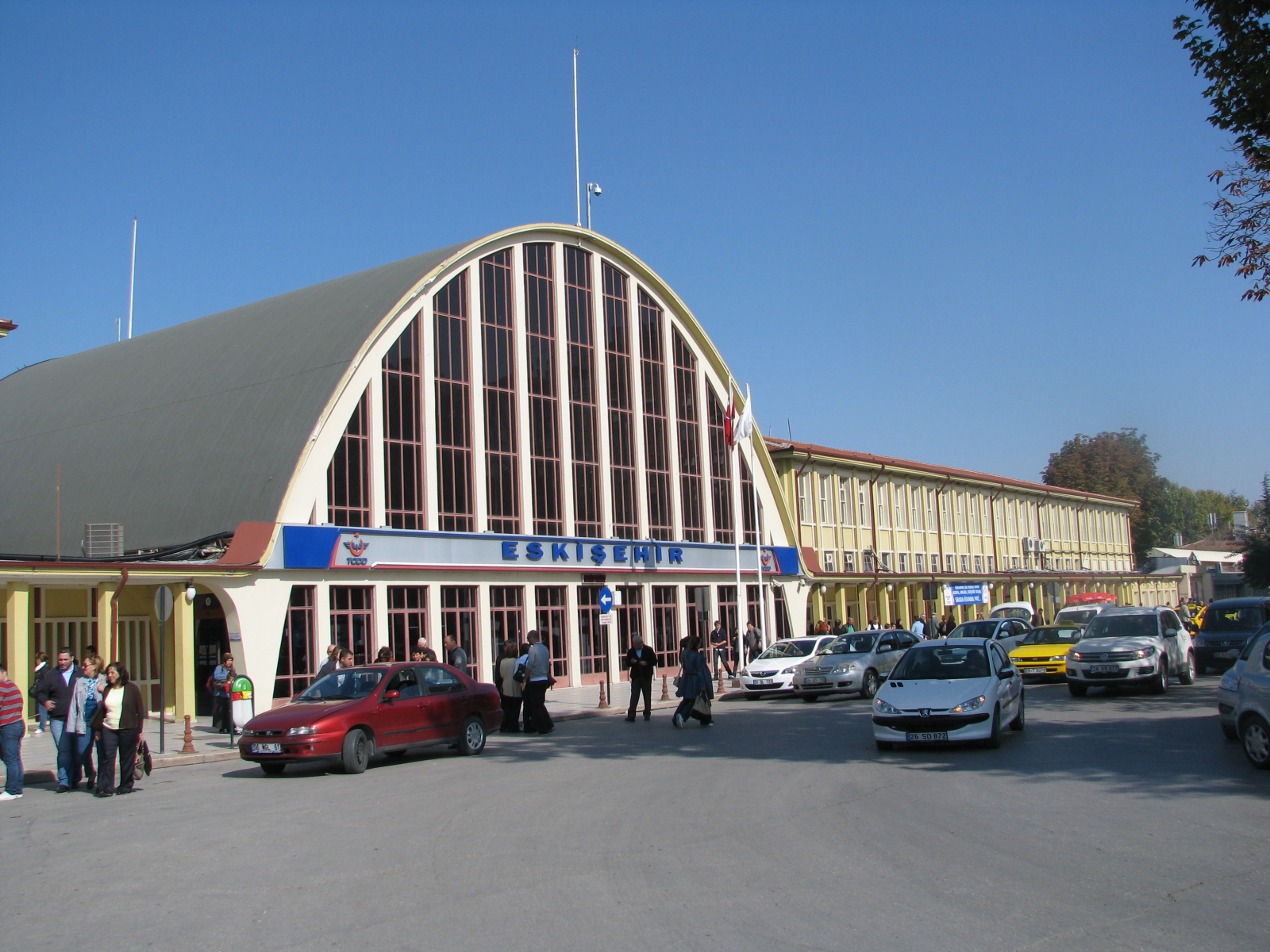
The facade of 1955 station building.

Railways came to Eskişehir in 1892, when the Anatolian Railway (CFOA) built its Istanbul–Ankara rail line, which passed through the city. The station opened on December 31, 1892 along with the entire line. Since Eskişehir was a town, whose industry was reliant on farming, growth of the town was limited. However, when the CFOA started construction of their mainline to Konya in 1893, the town was to become an important railway junction. During the construction, the CFOA opened a Locomotive maintenance facility in 1894, which would later become TÜLOMSAŞ. When the line to Konya was opened in 1896, industrialization of the town began. During the Turkish War of Independence, in 1919, the station facilities were used as a base for Turkish nationalist forces. In 1920, the station was taken over by the Greek Army only to be taken back by the Turks in 1922.

The war ended in 1923, but the CFOA was in bad shape due to heavy damage to the rails and locomotives. Shortly after the war, the locomotive maintenance facility was expanded to help the reconstruction of the line. A factory to build new locomotives and railcars as well as another factory to build switches and many personnel faculties were built, with funding from the new Turkish government. After World War II, a new grain elevator was built, which increased the growth of the town to a city. On June 19, 1953 construction of the present day station building started. The building was designed by Orhan Safa and cost 1,780,000 Turkish lira. The building was inaugurated on November 4, 1955, by Yümmü Üresin, the Minister of Transport. In the 1960s, the railway facilities were at their heyday constructing new locomotives at a heavy rate. In the 1990s, most of the facilities production declined and some were abandoned by 2000. In 2007, a plan to rebuild the station underground to open up traffic was concluded and construction started shortly after, despite heavy criticism. After a plan to demolish the main building, many railway workers protested against it and the station was then put under special protection as a historical building. Construction is planned to end in 2013.

== Current operations ==
Eskişehir today is an important station on the Istanbul-Ankara main line. It is visited by 16 intercity trains running between Istanbul and Ankara, 4 intercity trains between İzmir and Ankara, 20 Yüksek Hızlı Tren high-speed trains to Ankara, and 8 intercity trains to Istanbul. The first high speed train ran between Ankara and Eskişehir in 2009.

Connections to city buses are available outside the station building as well as connections to the citywide tram system.

== Gallery ==
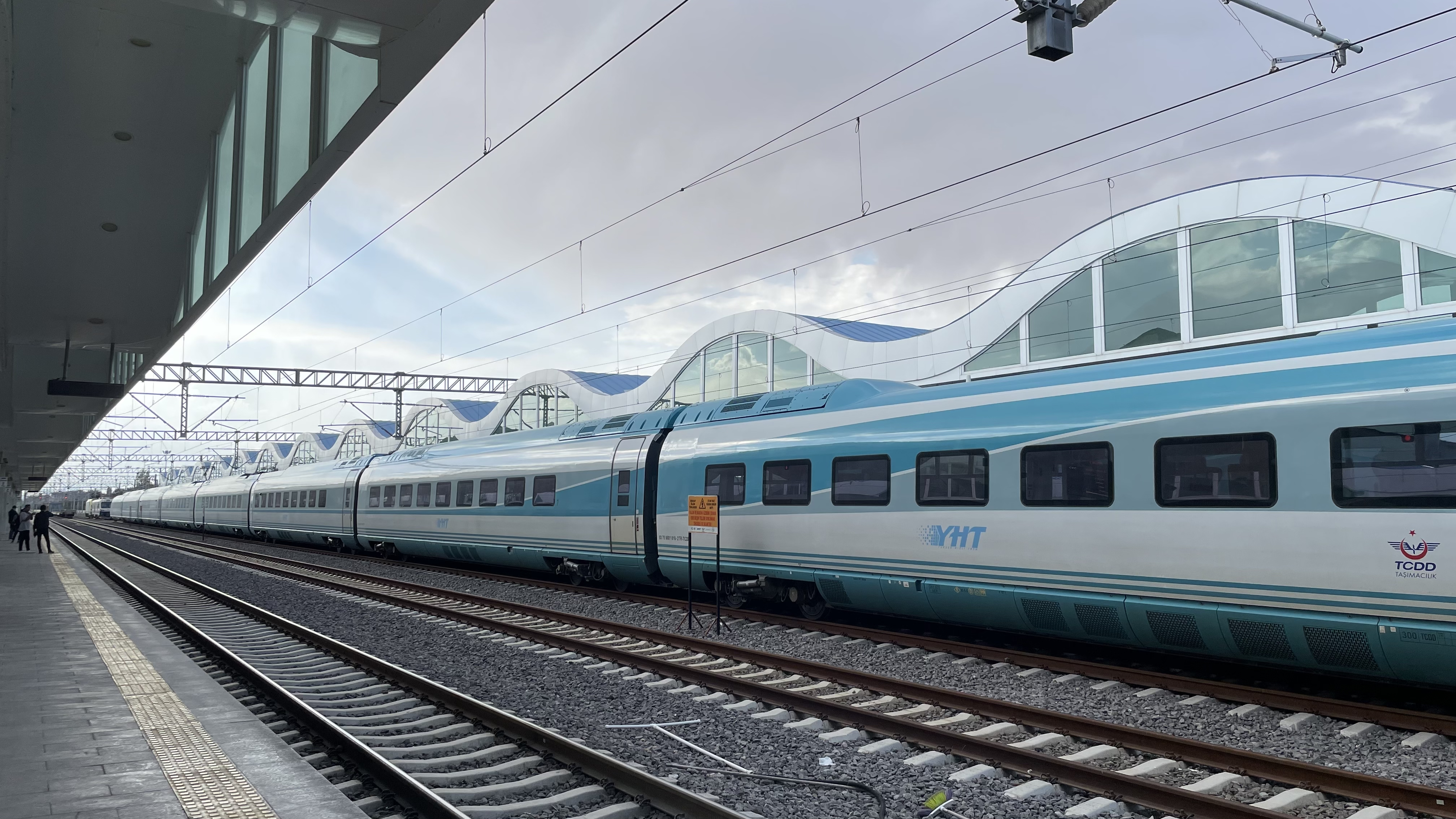
The station platform. On the far track is a high speed train.

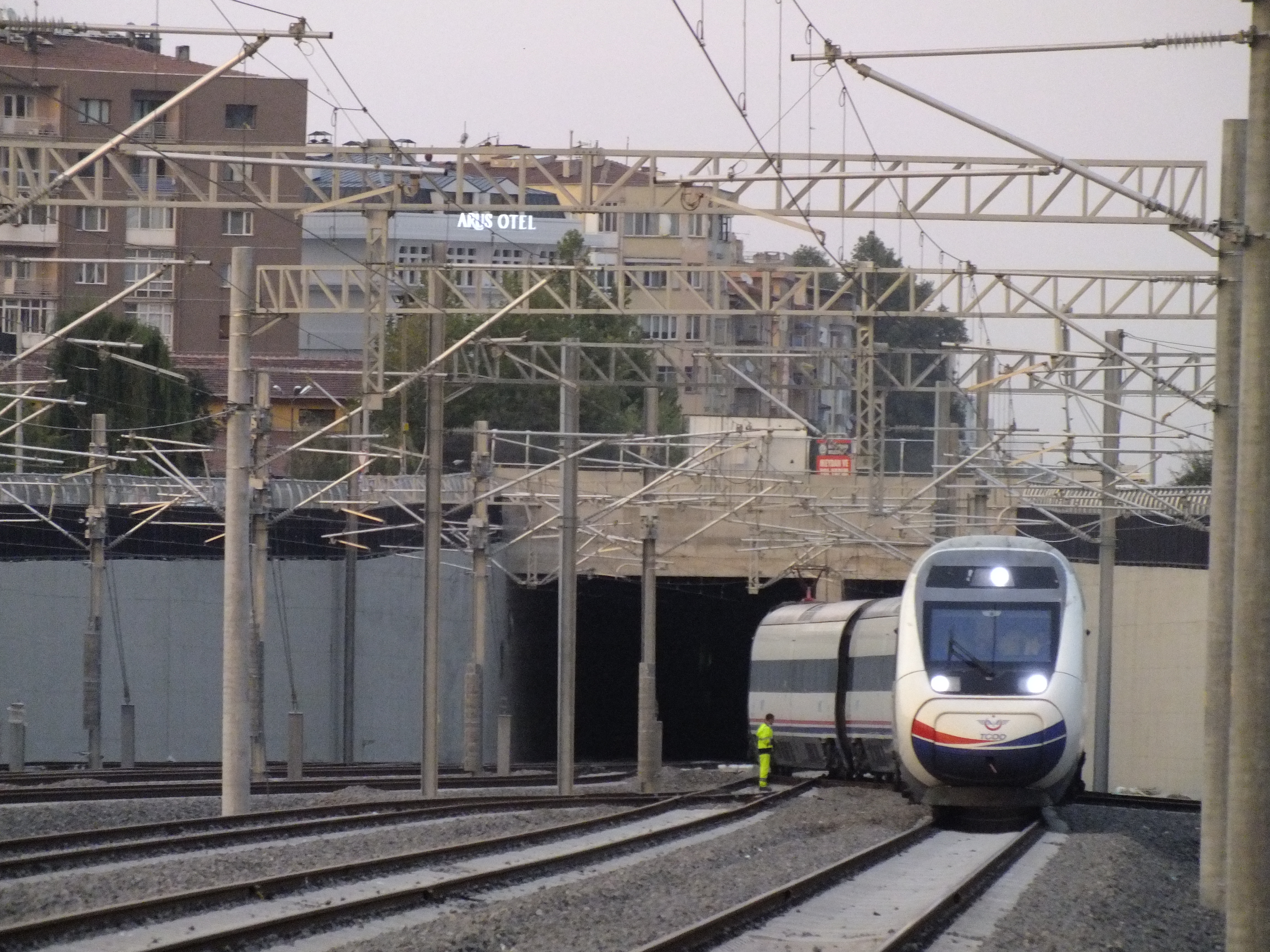
A high-speed train entering the station from the east.

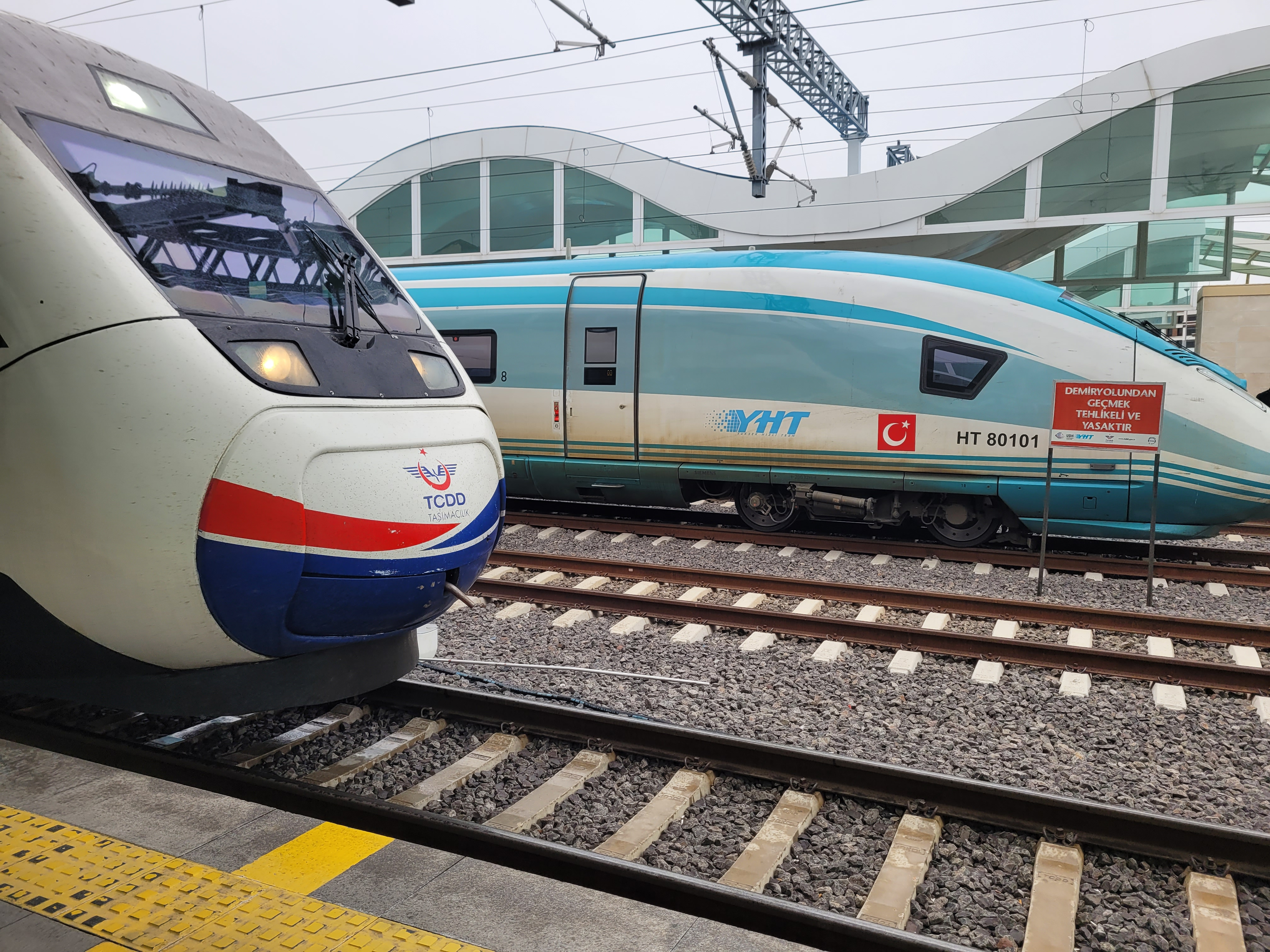
The high-speed trains close up.

== See also ==
- Enveriye station — another station in the city served by mainline trains
