= Alpu railway station =

Railway station in Alpu, Turkey

ALPU
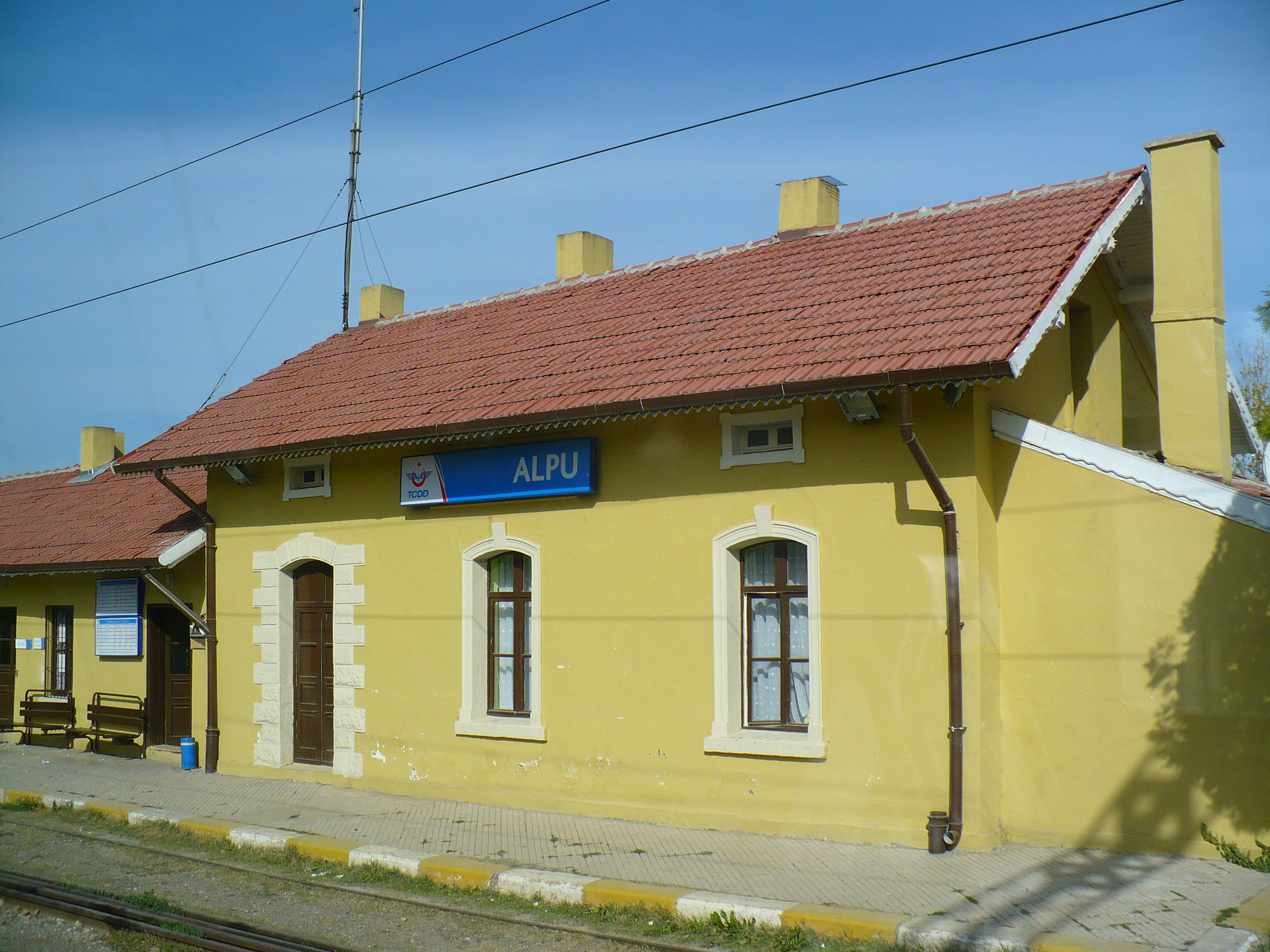

General information
- Location: Zübeyde Hanım Cd., 26850 Alpu/Eskişehir, Turkey
- Coordinates: 39.7680°N 30.9543°E
- Owner: TCDD
- Line: İzmir Blue Train
- Platforms: 2 side platforms
- Tracks: 2

Construction
- Structure type: At-Grade

History
- Opened: 31 December 1892
- Electrified: 1993 (25 kV AC)

Services
Preceding station	TCDD Taşımacılık	Following station
Eskişehir towards İzmir (Basmane)	İzmir Blue Train	Beylikova towards Ankara
Location

Alpu station is a railway station on the Istanbul–Ankara railway in the town of Alpu. The station was formerly served by many passenger trains running along the railway from Istanbul and İzmir towards Ankara and points beyond, but since the opening of the Istanbul-Ankara high-speed railway in 2013, all conventional passenger trains between Istanbul and Ankara were replaced by YHT high-speed service, which runs just south of the town along its own right-of-way. The only passenger train serving the station is the İzmir Blue Train operating daily from İzmir to Ankara.
