= Haydarpaşa =

Locality in Istanbul, Turkey

- Locality
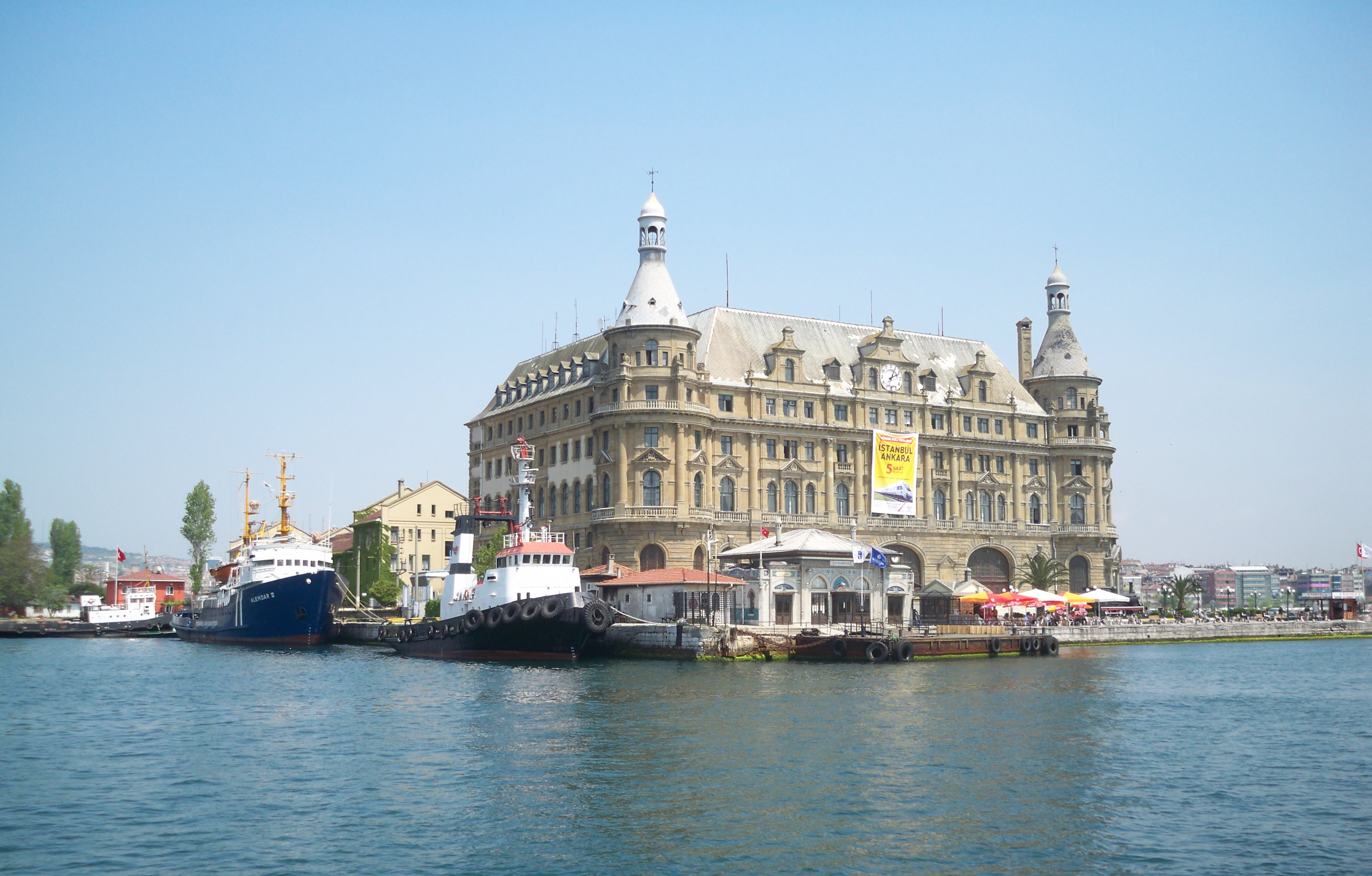
- Haydarpaşa Train Station

- Location within Istanbul
- Coordinates: 41°00′N 29°01′E
- Country: Turkey
- Region: Marmara
- Province: Istanbul
- District: Kadıköy
- Time zone: UTC+3 (FET)
- Postal code: 34716
- Area code: 0-216

Haydarpaşa is a locality within the Kadıköy and Üsküdar districts on the Asian part of Istanbul, Turkey. Haydarpaşa is named after Ottoman Vizier Haydar Pasha. The place, on the coast of Bosporus, borders Harem in the northwest and Kadıköy in the southeast. It is a historical area with almost solely public buildings. Haydarpaşa is administered by the mukhtars of Rasimpaşa and Osmanağa neighborhoods (Turkish: Mahallesi Muhtarı).

Internationally known structures around the area are the Haydarpaşa Terminal, Port of Haydarpaşa, and the Selimiye Barracks in adjacent Harem.

== Notable buildings ==
The following public structures, built in the 19th century or early 20th century during the Ottoman era, are found in Haydarpaşa:

=== Health and education ===
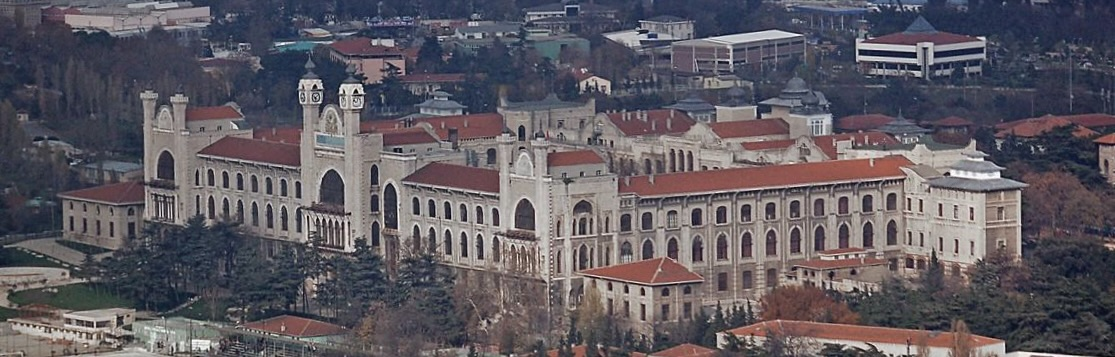
Marmara University's Faculty of Medicine building

- Haydarpaşa Numune Hastanesi (Haydarpaşa Paragon Hospital)
- GATA Haydarpaşa Eğitim Hastanesi (Haydarpaşa Hospital of Gülhane Military Medical Academy)
- Dr Siyami Ersek Hospital — A renowned hospital for cardiology
- Marmara University, Faculty of Medicine, Haydarpaşa Campus. The building was used by Haydarpaşa Lisesi (Haydarpaşa High School) from 1933 through 1983
- Haydarpaşa Technical High schools
- Haydarpaşa Jewish School (École Communale Israélite de Haidar-Pacha). A Jewish school was established in Yeldeğirmen in 1875. A new building may have been built in 1903. After the Ministry of Education required Jewish schools to choose between Hebrew or Turkish as the primary language of instruction, French education could no longer be offered and enrolled dropped from 150 to 50. The school closed in 1935. The wooden part of the building was demolished at some point, but the brick part remains.

=== Transportation ===
- Haydarpaşa Terminal — One of the two main railway terminals of Istanbul serving the railway net in Anatolia
- Port of Haydarpaşa — Biggest container terminal in Istanbul
- Haydarpaşa Ferry boat terminal — Passenger ferries connecting trains to Sirkeci and Karaköy on the European side, and Kadıköy

=== History ===
- Haydarpaşa Cemetery — Historical British military and civilian cemetery

== Vicinity ==
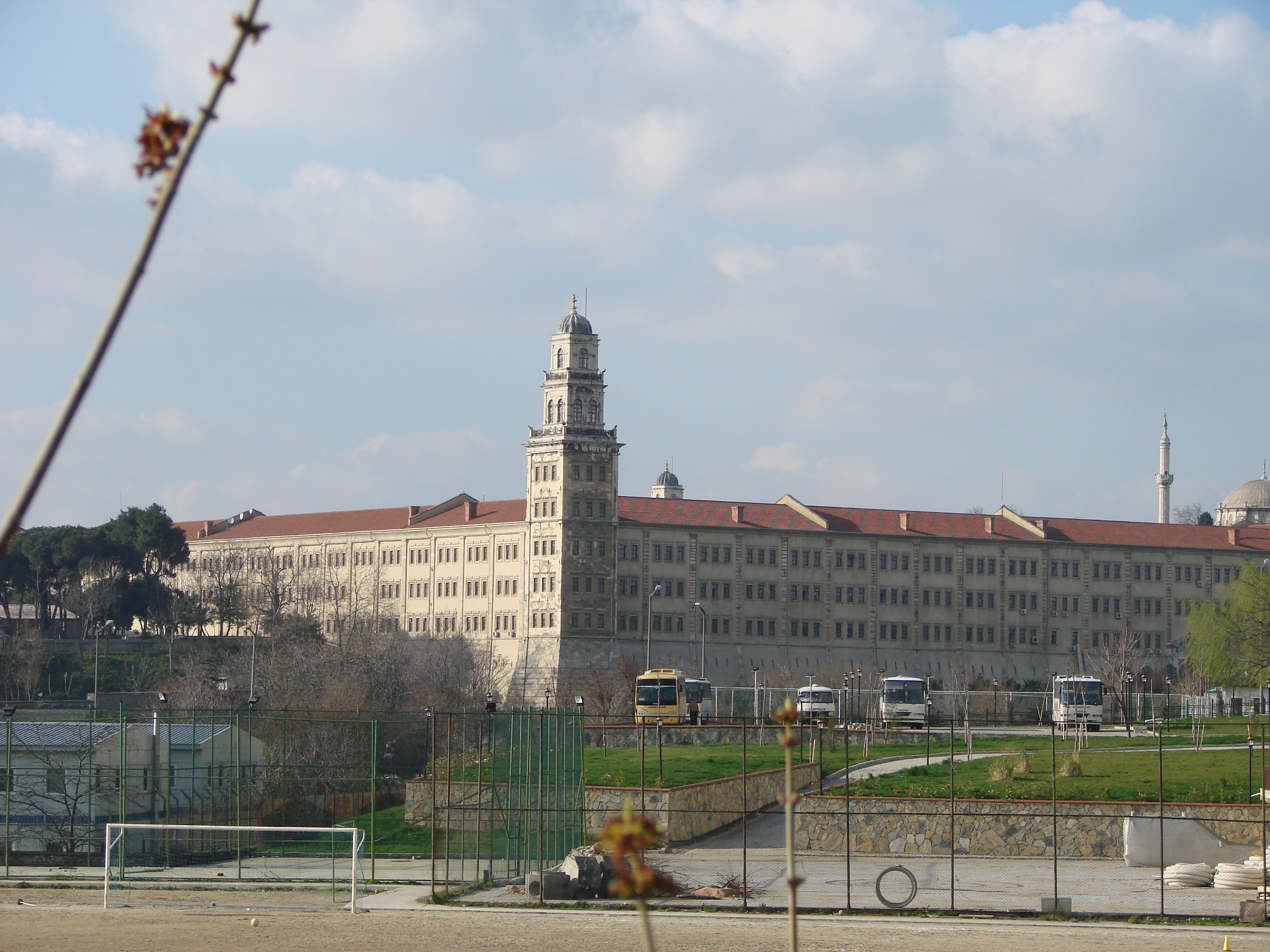
Selimiye Barracks

- Selimiye Barracks — Historical barracks, where Florence Nightingale served between 1854 and 1856
- Karacaahmet Cemetery — Biggest cemetery in Turkey

== See also ==
- Bombing of Istanbul in WWI
