= Water Transport Workers Federation of India =

Trade union in India

Water Transport Workers Federation of India (WTWFI), founded in the late 1970s is a trade union representing workers at India's government-owned ports. It is affiliated with the Centre of Indian Trade Unions, which is the labour wing of the Communist Party of India (Marxist). It was founded as a result of split in the Communist Party of India.

WTWFI is opposed to the Indian government's plans to corporatize the port sector, calling it anti-labour and a giveaway of public property to private firms.
