= Kütahya railway station =

Kütahya

General information
- Location: D.650, Yıldırım Beyazıt Mah. 43020, Kütahya Merkez/Kütahya; Turkey
- Coordinates: 39.4203°N 30.0008°E
- System: TCDD intercity and regional rail station
- Owner: Turkish State Railways
- Operator: TCDD Taşımacılık
- Line: İzmir Blue Train Pamukkale Express Aegean Express Eskişehir–Tavşanlı Eskişehir–Kütahya Eskişehir–Afyon
- Platforms: 2 (1 island platform, 1 side platform)
- Tracks: 3

Construction
- Structure type: At-grade
- Parking: None

History
- Opened: 30 December 1894

Services
Preceding station	TCDD Taşımacılık	Following station
Demirciören towards İzmir (Basmane)	İzmir Blue Train	Alayunt towards Ankara
Demirciören towards İzmir (Basmane)	Aegean Express	Terminus
Çöğürler towards Denizli	Pamukkale Express	Alayunt towards Eskişehir
Köprüören towards Tavşanlı	Eskişehir–Tavşanlı	Alayunt towards Eskişehir
Çöğürler towards Afyon	Eskişehir–Afyon	Alayunt towards Eskişehir
Terminus	Eskişehir–Kütahya	Alayunt towards Eskişehir
Location

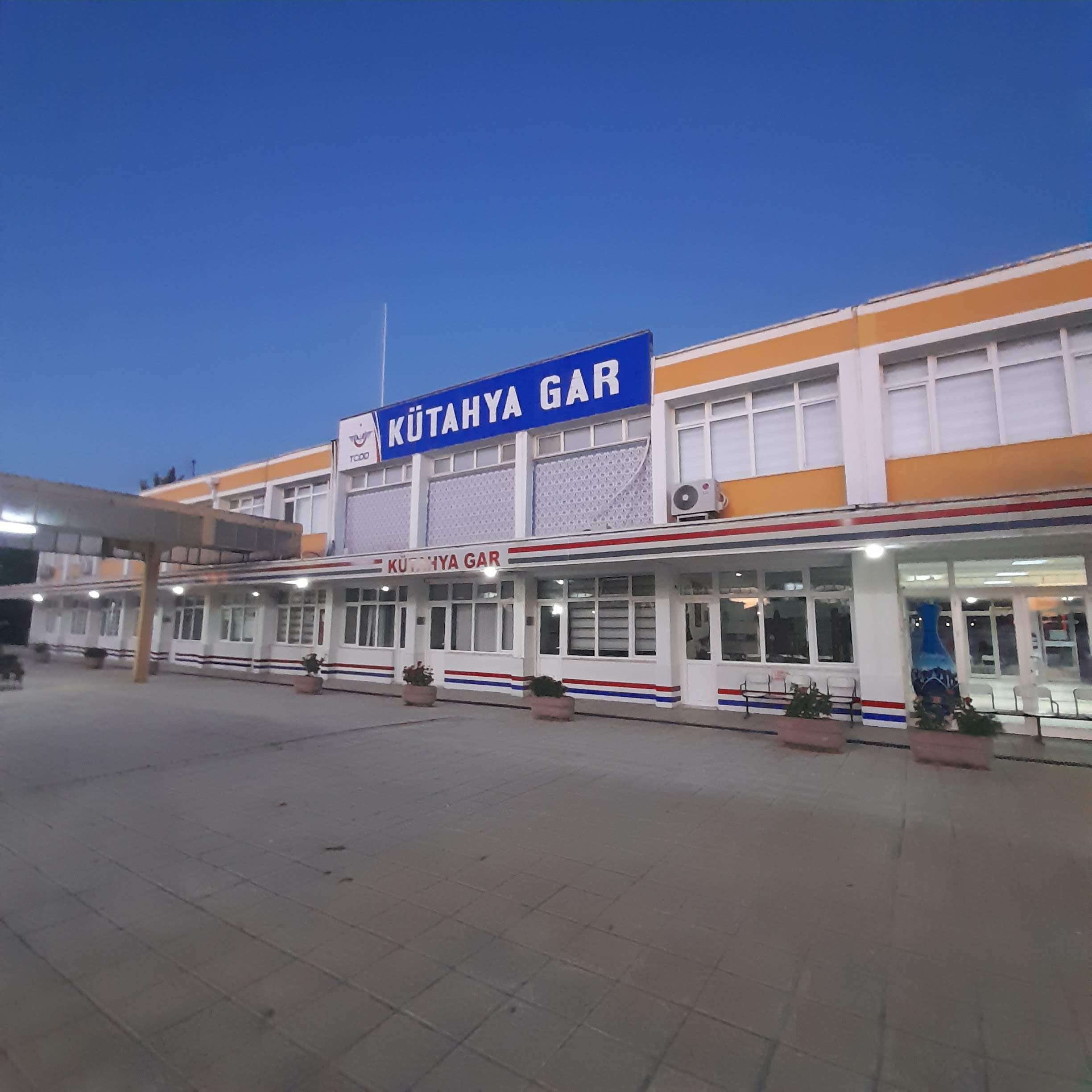
Kütahya railway station

Kütahya station is a station in the city of Kütahya, Turkey. The station is on the northern perimeter of the city and despite Kütahya having a population over 200,000, it is the only station in the city. Originally opened on 30 December 1894 by the Ottoman Anatolian Railway, the station is now owned by the Turkish State Railways.

TCDD Taşımacılık operates five daily trains, all from Eskişehir. Out of these five trains, two are mainline service while the other three are regional trains.
