= İsmetpaşa =

- Neighbourhood
- Location in Turkey İsmetpaşa (Turkey Central Anatolia)
- Coordinates: 39°28′N 30°53′E
- Country: Turkey
- Province: Eskişehir
- District: Mahmudiye
- Elevation: 950 m (3,120 ft)
- Population (2022): 1,117
- Time zone: UTC+3 (TRT)
- Postal code: 26800
- Area code: 0222

İsmetpaşa is a neighbourhood of the municipality and district of Mahmudiye, Eskişehir Province, Turkey. Its population is 1,117 (2022). It is situated in the high plains of Central Anatolia. Distance to Mahmudiye is 10 kilometres (6.2 mi) and to Eskişehir is 50 kilometres (31 mi). The village is populated by Kurds.
