= Alayunt =

- Neighbourhood
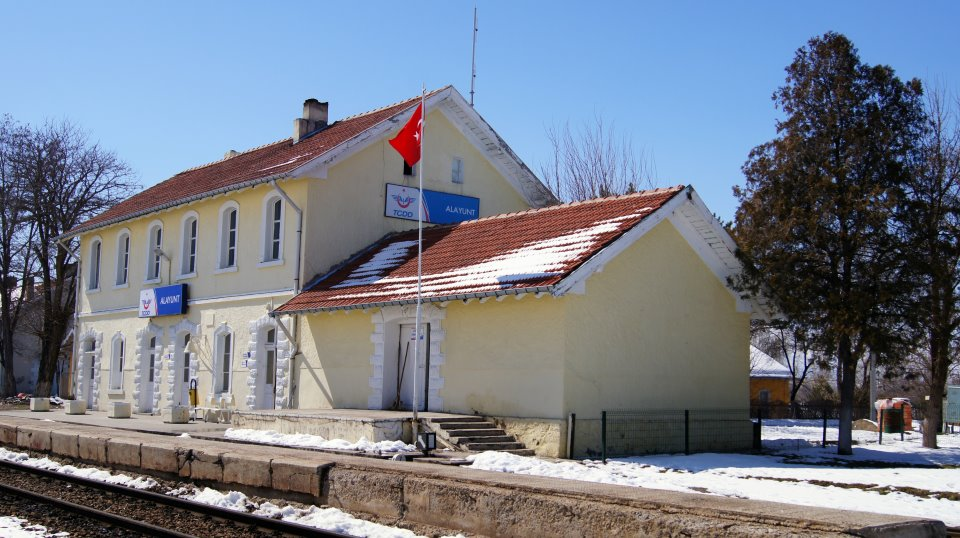
- Alayunt railway station in 2012.

- Location within Turkey Location within Turkey Aegean
- Coordinates: 39.4003°N 30.1072°E
- Country: Turkey
- Province: Kütahya
- District: Kütahya
- Municipality: Kütahya

Government
  - Muhtar: Mehmet Erdoğmuş
- Area: 0.64 km^{2} (0.25 sq mi)
- Elevation: 940 m (3,080 ft)
- Population (2022): 419
  - Density: 650/km^{2} (1,700/sq mi)
- Time zone: UTC+3 (TRT)

Alayunt is a neighbourhood of the city Kütahya, Kütahya District, Kütahya Province, Turkey. Its population is 419 (2022). The village is situated about 9 km (5.6 mi) east of Kütahya, the provincial capital.

Alayunt is most known for the railway junction situated just south of the village. Alayunt railway station is serviced by ten daily trains and also consists of a small yard for freight trains. Apart from the railway station, the Kütahya Industrial Park (Kütahya OSB) is located southeast of the village. Founded in 2004, the park has grown since and is currently the largest industrial park in the Kütahya Province.

The current muhtar of Alayunt is Mehmet Erdoğmuş.

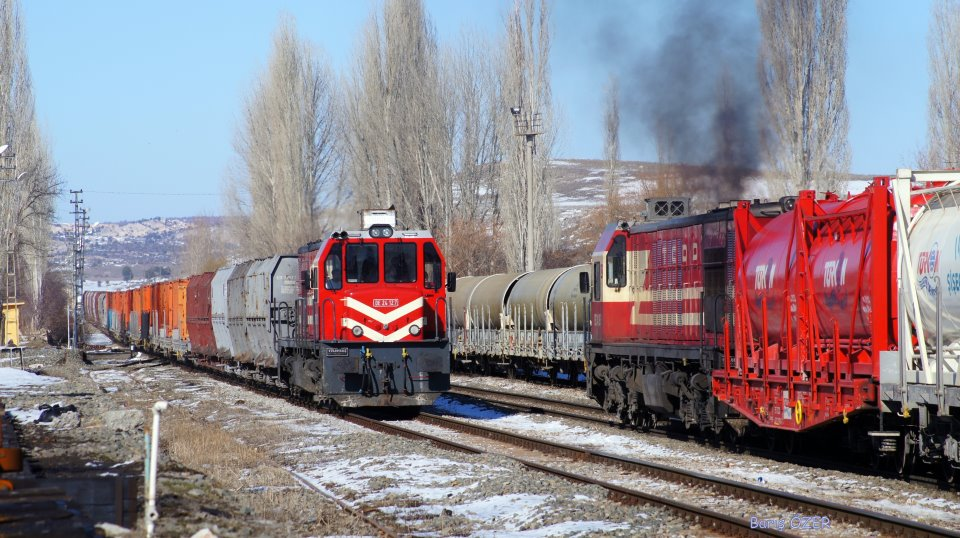
Two freight trains meet in Alayunt.
