= Port of Haydarpaşa =

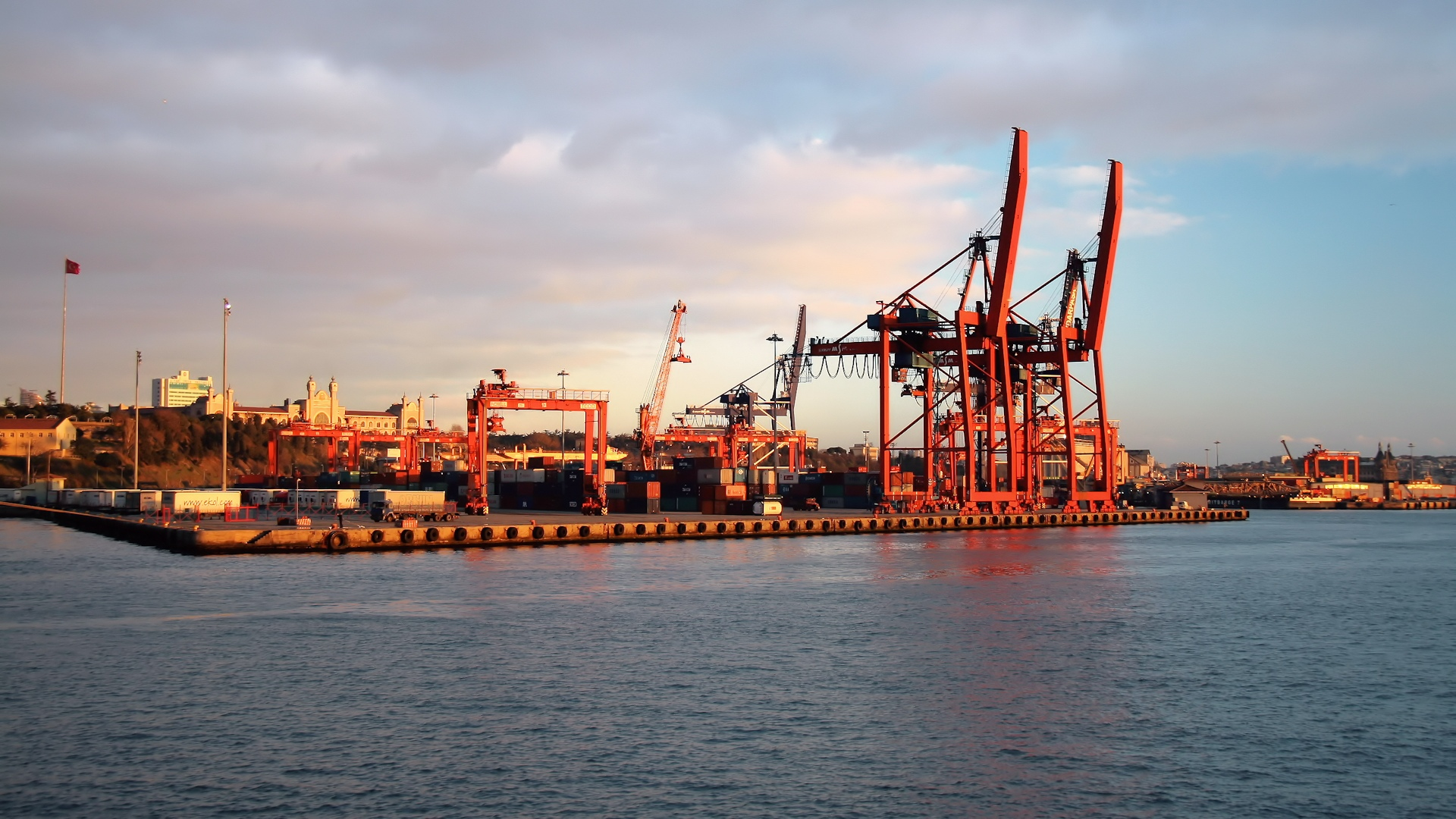
- Port of Haydarpaşa
- Interactive map of Port of Haydarpaşa

Location
- Country: Turkey
- Location: Haydarpaşa, Istanbul
- Coordinates: 41°00′12″N 29°00′50″E
- UN/LOCODE: TRHAY

Details
- Opened: 1899
- Operated by: Turkish State Railways
- No. of berths: 21
- No. of piers: 2
- Port operations director: Musa Sırt
- Container: 1,200 vessels/year at 5 terminals
- Ro-ro and ro-pax: 360 vessels/year
- General cargo: 1,134 cargo ships/year

Statistics
- Website http://www.tcdd.gov.tr/home/detail/?id=273

The Port of Haydarpaşa, also known as the Port of Haidar Pasha (Turkish: Haydarpaşa Limanı) or the Port of Istanbul, is a general cargo seaport, ro-ro and container terminal, situated in Haydarpaşa, Istanbul, Turkey at the southern entrance to the Bosphorus, near Haydarpaşa Station. It is operated by the Turkish State Railways (TCDD) and serves a hinterland which includes the country's most industrialised areas.

It is the largest port in Istanbul, and the second-largest in the Marmara Region, after Ambarlı. With an annual cargo volume exceeding six million metric tons (MT), it is Turkey's fourth-biggest port after Mersin, Ambarlı, Istanbul and Izmir.

== History ==
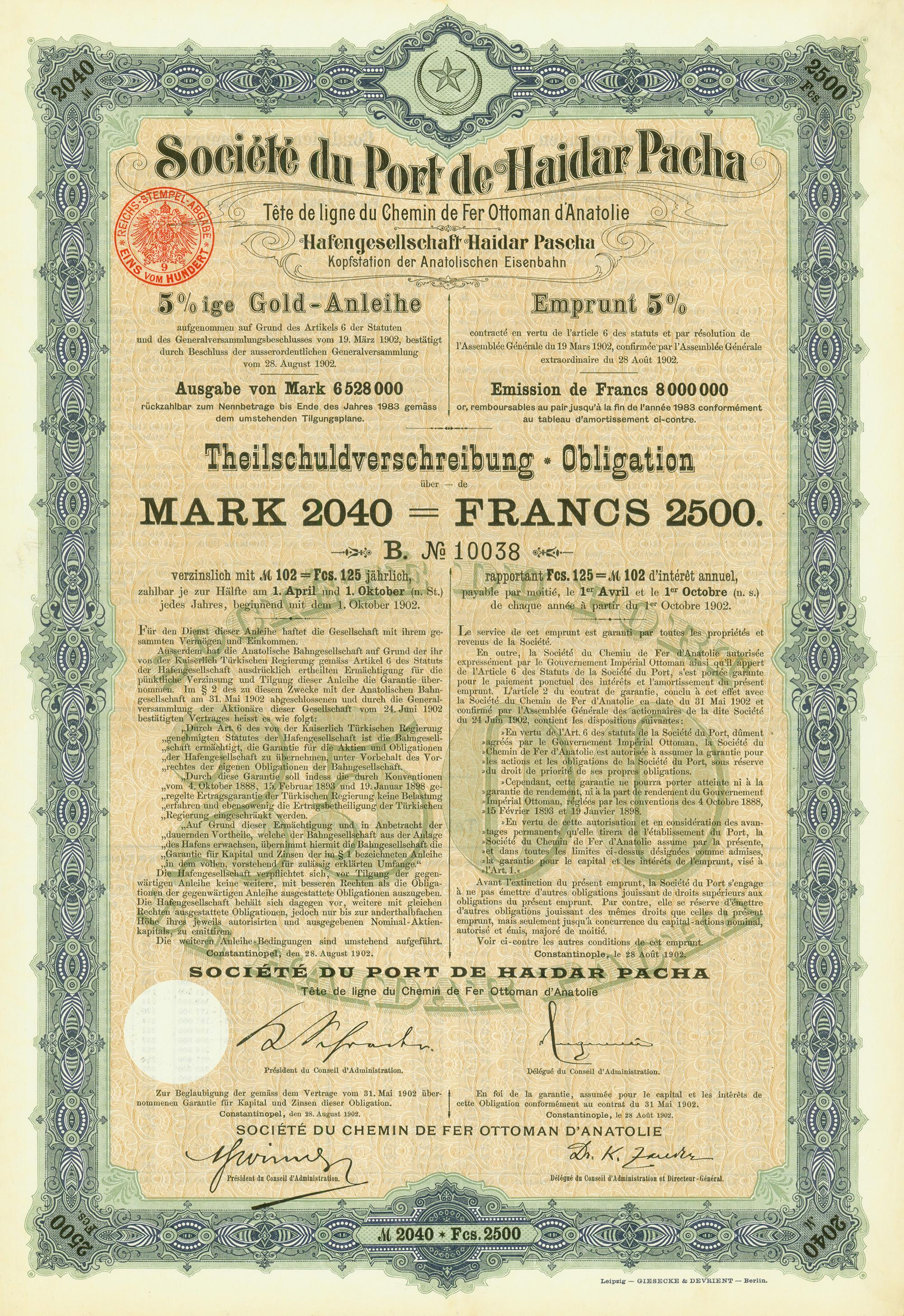
Bond of the Soc. du Port de Haidar Pacha, issued 28. October 1902

The Anatolian Railway began construction of the port on April 20, 1899, and operated the port until the newly established Turkish Republic purchased it on May 24, 1924. On May 31, 1927, the port's administration was handed over to the Turkish State Railways (TCDD).

On February 5, 1953, an extension for the Port of Haydarpaşa was started. The first part was completed in 1954 and the remainder in 1967.

== Port facilities ==
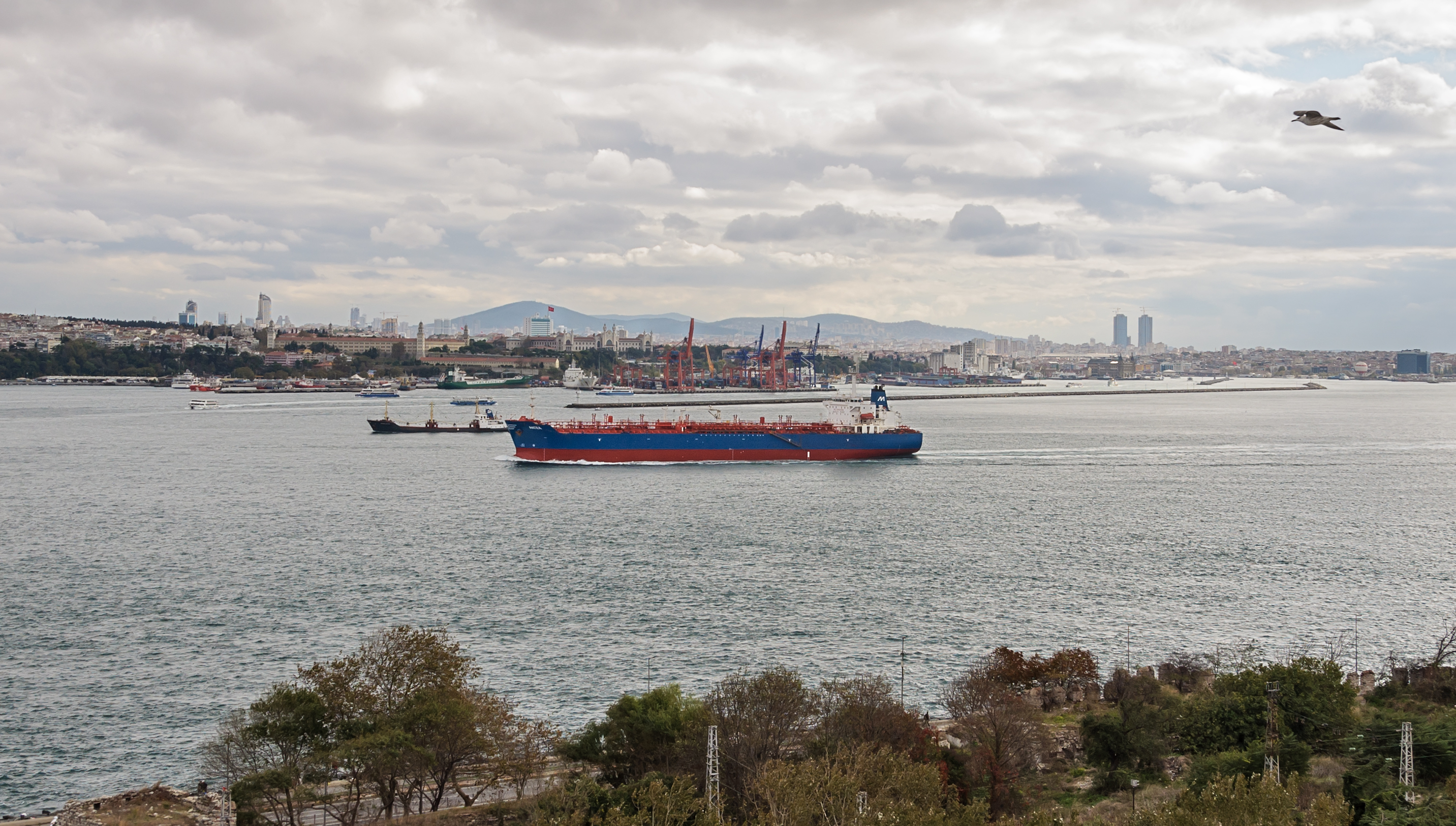
The port of Haydarpaşa seen from the Fourth Courtyard of the Topkapı Palace

The Port has 21 berths alongside two large piers. The berths are specialized for particular port industries, with one for motor boat servicing at 150 m in length, two for dry bulk cargo (430 m long), 8 large-size berths for general cargo (between 160 and 334 m), 3 mid-size general cargo berths (between 50 and 97 m), two ro-ro terminals (141 and 164 m) and, finally, 5 container terminals (between 295 and 350 m). The depth of water at the quays varies between 5 and 10 m. The vessels in the port are protected by two breakwaters from all kinds of effects caused by the weather and sea.

Sea crafts of the port comprise 3 tugboats up to 2500 HP and 2 mooring watercraft.

=== Container terminal ===
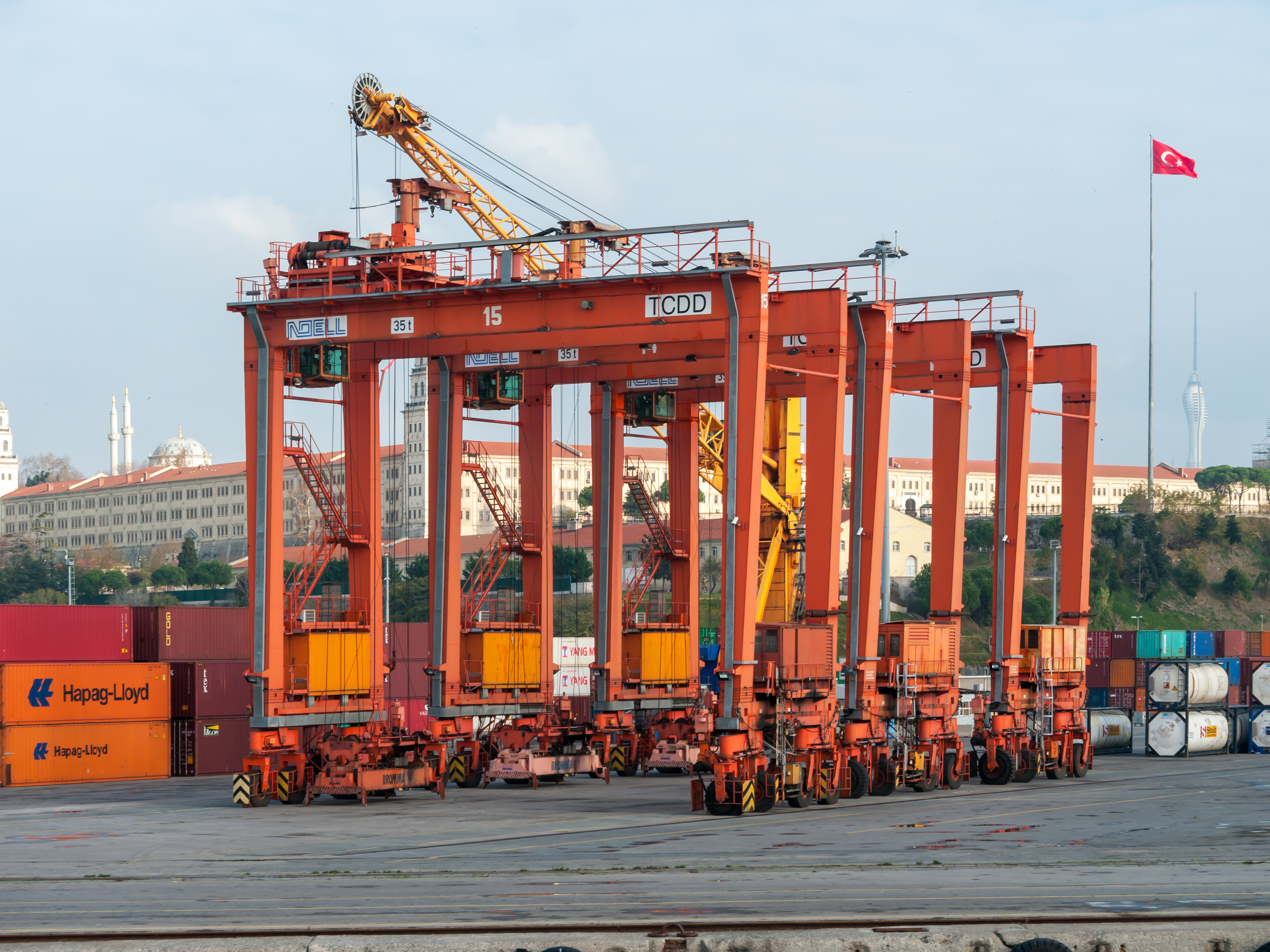
Straddle carriers in the Port of Haydarpasa

Total container handling capacity of the five container terminals is 1,700 vessels a year. Operations are carried out by 4 quayside gantry cranes of 40 tons' capacity, 18 rubber-tired gantry cranes (40 tons' capacity), 9 reach stackers (25 to 42 tons) and 8 empty container forklifts (8 to 10 tons). Nine shore and yard cranes (3 to 35 tons), 6 mobile cranes (5 to 25 tons), 8 standard and 30 small-masted forklifts are also available. Another facility available at the terminal is the provision of reefer facilities for refrigerated containers.

The space for container terminal is nearly 100.000 m^{2} with a holding capacity of 15,000 twenty-foot equivalent units (TEU). The annual handling capacity of the Port is 750,000 TEU. A container freight station of 3,600 m^{2} is available behind the container quay. In addition to the open storage area of 313,000 m^{2} and covered area of 21,000 m^{2}, there exists a container land terminal outside the port in Göztepe for stacking the empty containers. It covers an area of 55,000 m^{2} with a holding capacity of 52,800 TEUTEU.

Container loading and unloading, and custom clearance are made in the terminal at the port.

=== Ro-ro terminal ===
The ro-ro terminal can accommodate 360 vessels per year, and handle 410,000 tons of cargo, 65,000 trucks and 60,000 cars a year. There is a bi-weekly ro-pax cargo and passenger ferry service between the ports Haydarpaşa and Chornomorsk, Ukraine.

=== General cargo handling equipment ===
At the port, 1,134 general cargo ships can be serviced a year. The floating crafts comprise one floating crane of 250 tons' capacity, 17 shore and yard cranes (3 to 35 tons), 17 mobile cranes (5 to 25 tons), 67 general cargo forklifts (2 to 5 tons), one loader, 6 tractors, 25 trailers (40 tons), 10 trailers (20 tons) and two weigh-bridges of 100 tons' capacity.

=== Bulk handling facilities ===
Two berths serve the dry bulk traffic of up to 79 vessels a year. A grain silo of 34,000 tons' capacity belonging to the Turkish Grain Board (TMO) is available and has a conveyor connection with the quay.

=== Rail ferry terminal ===
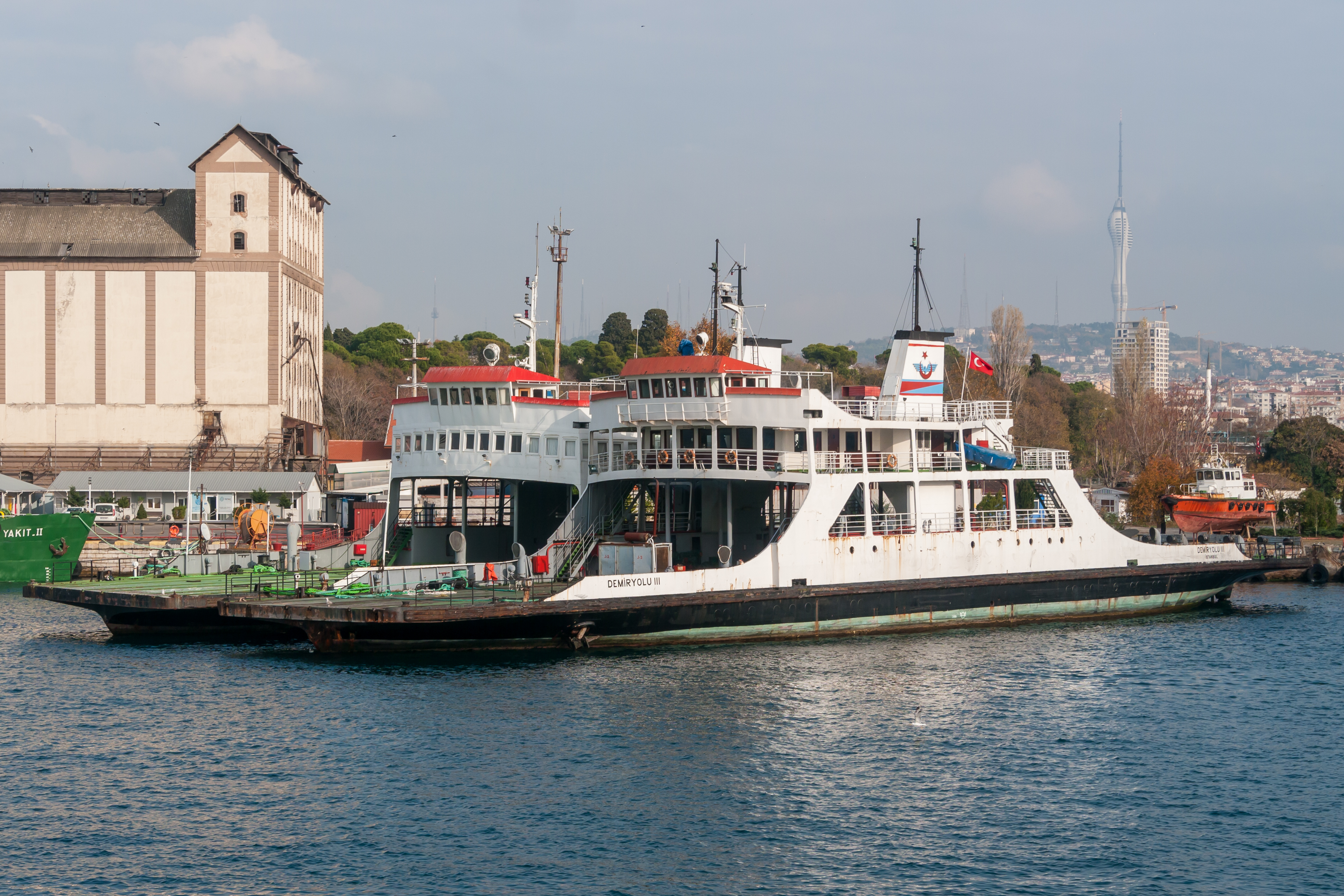
Rail ferry Demiryolu III

The rail ferry terminal and ferries are operated between Sirkeci and Haydarpaşa, the two sides of Bosphorus. Each of the three rail ferries with 480 tons capacity can transfer 14 rail carriages.

== Port navigation ==
Pilotage is compulsory for berthing, unberthing and anchoring, a service provided round the clock by the Turkish Maritime Administration (TDİ). Pilots meet vessels west of a line passing through the light on the breakwater of Kumkapı Fishing Boat Harbour on the European side of Sea of Marmara.

Towage is not necessary for vessels up to 1500 gt. A mooring boat is compulsory and arranged by pilot. The service is provided by the Port Authority round the clock.

== Future project ==
The port and its surroundings have been the subject of plans for redevelopment since around 2006 but in 2026 it was still operating as a city-centre container port.

== See also ==
- Baghdad Railway
- Haydarpaşa Terminal
- Marmaray
