= Ali Çetinkaya railway station =

Railway station in Turkey

ALİ ÇETİNKAYA
- The station building, modeled after the one in Ankara.

General information
- Location: İstasyon Cd., Ali Çetinkaya Mah., 03200; Afyonkarahisar; Turkey
- Coordinates: 38.7640°N 30.5523°E
- System: TCDDT inter-city and regional rail station
- Owner: Turkish State Railways
- Operator: TCDD Taşımacılık
- Lines: Eskişehir-Konya railway İzmir-Afyon railway Afyon-Karakuyu railway Polatlı-İzmir high-speed railway (Under construction)
- Platforms: 2 (1 side platform, 1 island platform)
- Tracks: 3

Construction
- Structure type: At-grade
- Parking: Yes
- Architectural style: Art Deco

Other information
- Status: Open

History
- Opened: 4 August 1895
- Rebuilt: 1939
- Original company: Anatolian Railway

Services
Preceding station	TCDD Taşımacılık	Following station
Balmahmut towards İzmir (Basmane)	Konya Blue Train	Büyükçobanlar towards Konya
Tınaztepe towards Denizli	Pamukkale Express	Gazlıgöl towards Eskişehir
Terminus	Eskişehir–Afyon	Gazlıgöl towards Eskişehir
Future service
Uşak towards İzmir (Alsancak)	Yüksek Hızlı Tren	Polatlı YHT towards Ankara
Location

Ali Çetinkaya railway station (Turkish: Ali Çetinkaya garı) is the main railway station in Afyonkarahisar, Turkey. The station is one of Afyon's two railway stations, the other being Afyonkarahisar Şehir railway station. Ali Çetinkaya station was built in 1895 by the Anatolian Railway as part of their main line between Istanbul and Konya. The Turkish State Railways acquired the Anatolian Railway in 1927. In 1936 the State Railways connected the two station together with the opening of the Afyon-Karakuyu line. The station was rebuilt with a station building half the size of the one in Ankara and inaugurated on July 18, 1939, by president İsmet İnönü and Minister of Transport Ali Çetinkaya. Ali Çetinkaya station was always the busier station of the two and after 1939 all railway traffic in Afyon was handled from this station. When Ali Çetinkaya died in 1949, the station was renamed in his honor.
