= Eskişehir-Afyon Regional =

Regional rail in Turkey

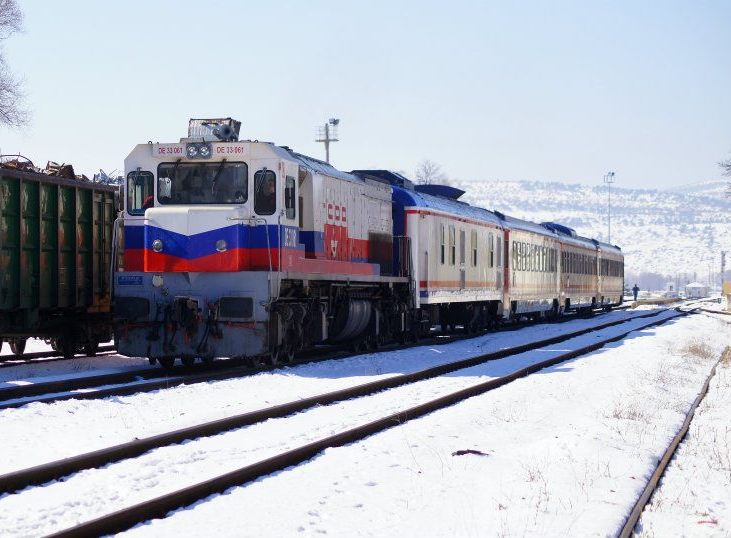
- A southbound train at Alayunt in 2012.

Overview
- Service type: Regional rail
- Status: Operating
- Locale: Central Turkey
- First service: 17 May 2010
- Current operator: TCDD Taşımacılık
- Former operator: Turkish State Railways (Until 2016)

Route
- Termini: Eskişehir station, Eskişehir; Ali Çetinkaya station, Afyonkarahisar
- Stops: 15
- Distance travelled: 171 km (106 mi)
- Average journey time: 3 hours, 24 minutes
- Service frequency: Daily
- Train numbers: 72405 (Northbound); 72406 (Southbound)

On-board services
- Class: Coach class
- Seating arrangements: 2+1
- Catering facilities: At-seat snack service

Technical
- Track gauge: 1,435 mm (4 ft 8 1/2 in)

The Eskişehir-Afyon Regional, numbered as B73 (Turkish: Eskişehir-Afyon Bölgeseli), is a daily regional passenger train operating between Eskişehir and Afyon. The train serves as a connecting train for high-speed YHT trains, serving Eskişehir, to Kütahya and Afyon. Operated by TCDD Taşımacılık, one daily train in each direction makes the 171 km (106 mi) journey.

Service began on 17 May 2010, one year after the opening of the Ankara-Eskişehir high-speed railway. The northbound train departs Afyon in the morning, while the southbound train departs Eskişehir in the evening.
