= Pamukkale Express =

Passenger train in Turkey

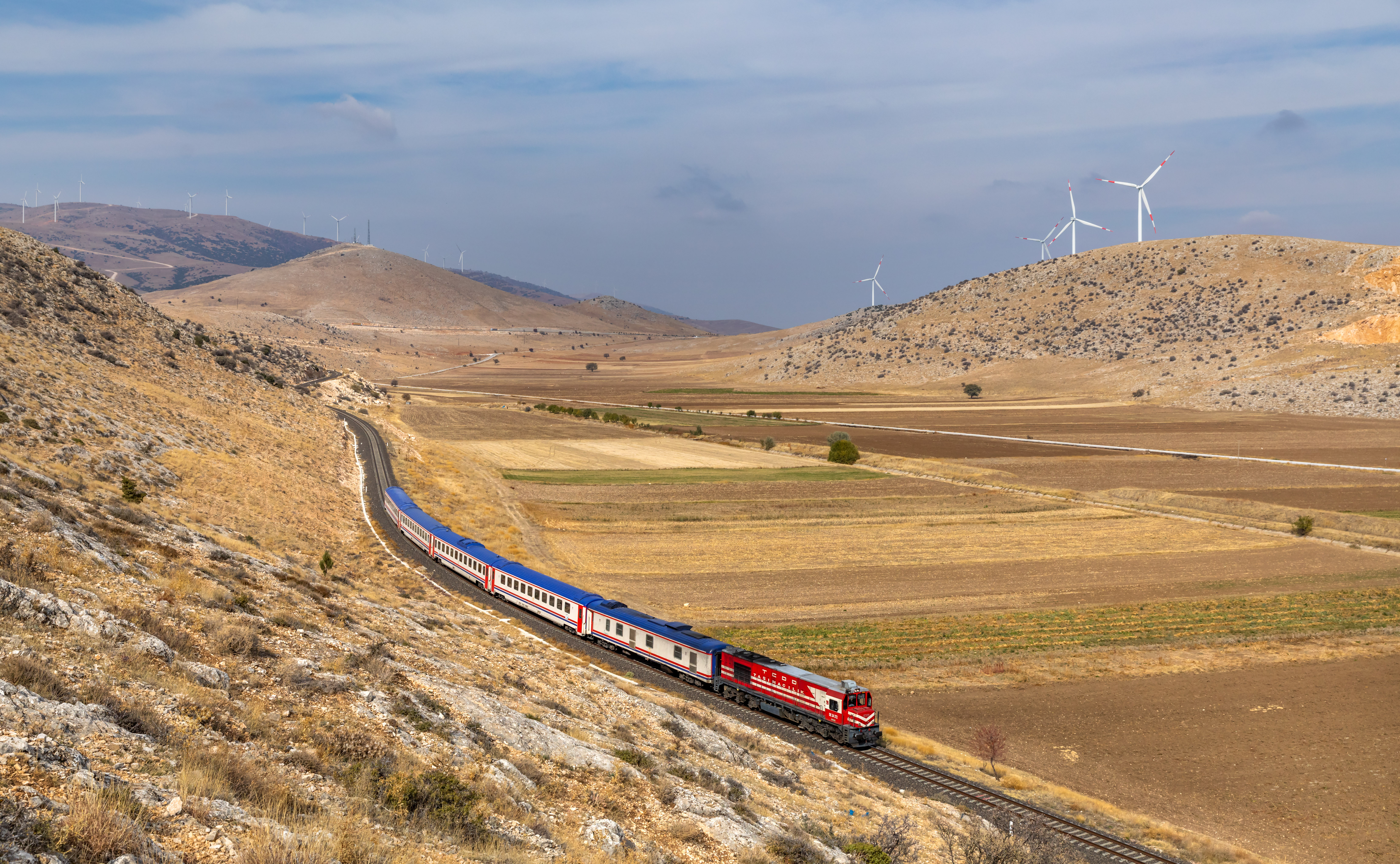
- Pamukkale Express in 2022

Overview
- Service type: Inter-city rail
- Status: Operating
- Locale: Central Turkey
- First service: 28 August 1978
- Current operator: Turkish State Railways

Route
- Termini: Eskişehir; Denizli
- Stops: 31
- Distance travelled: 421 km (262 mi)
- Average journey time: 7 hours, 55 minutes
- Service frequency: Daily

On-board services
- Catering facilities: At-seat snack service

Technical
- Track gauge: 1,435 mm (4 ft 8 1/2 in)

The Pamukkale Express (Turkish: Pamukkale Ekspresi) is a passenger train operated daily by the Turkish State Railways between Eskişehir and Denizli. The train covers a distance of 421 km (262 mi) in a scheduled time of 7 hours and 55 minutes through mountainous and mostly rural central Anatolia.

The Pamukkale Express formerly operated as a night train between Haydarpaşa Terminal in Istanbul and Denizli, with through cars to Burdur and Isparta. In 2008 train service was suspended for seven years until being revived in 2015 as a day train on its current route.
