= Hilal railway station =

Railway station in İzmir, Turkey

Hilal
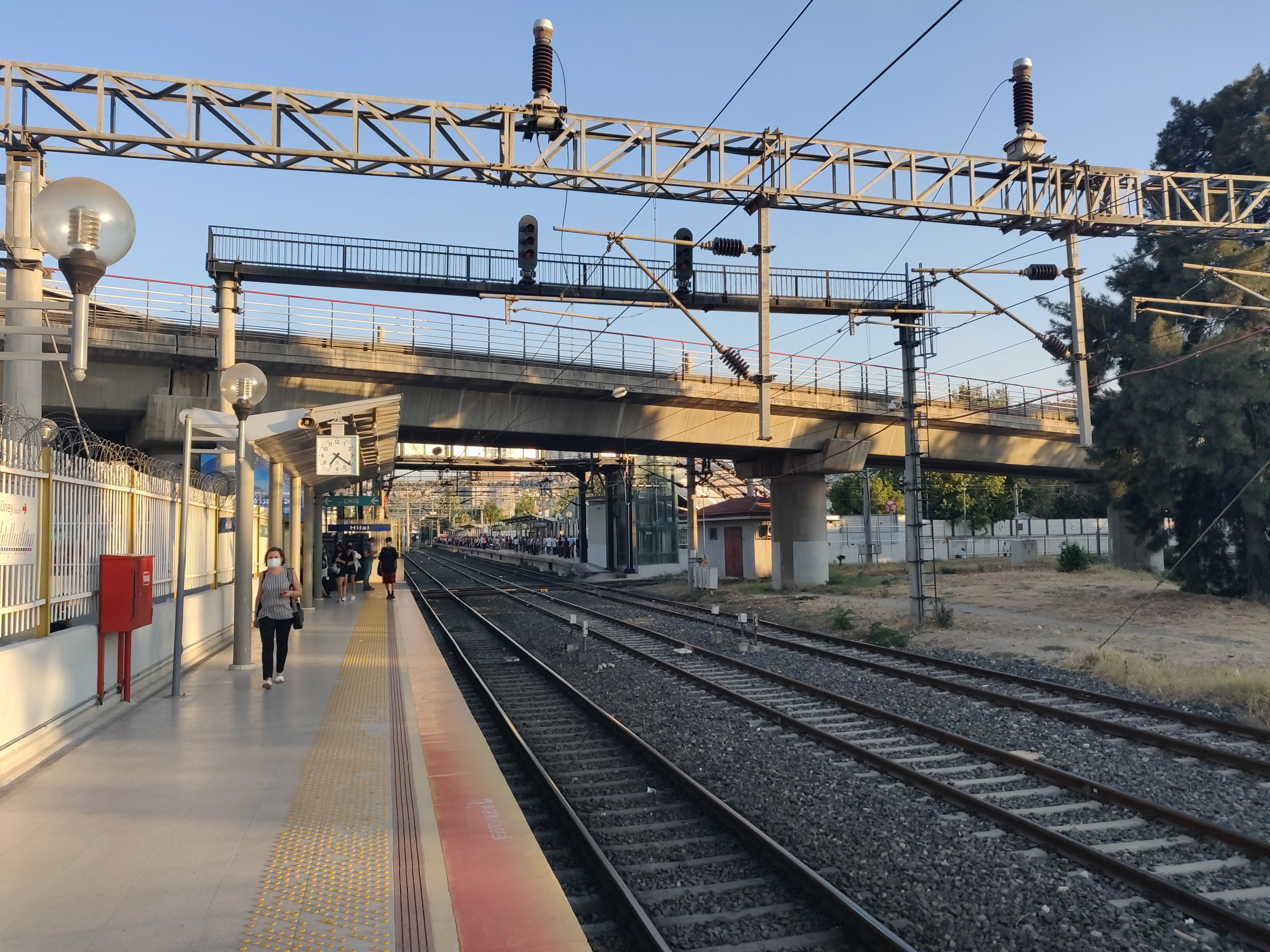
- Looking south from the northbound platform. The railroad crossing is visible before the southbound station.

General information
- Location: Turkey
- Coordinates: 38.42675°N 27.15386°E
- System: İZBAN commuter rail station
- Owner: Turkish State Railways
- Operator: TCDD Transport; İZBAN A.Ş.
- Lines: İzmir-Eğirdir railway İzmir-Afyon railway
- Platforms: 1 side platform (before 2001), 2 side platforms (2013)
- Tracks: 2 (before 2001), 3 (2013)
- Connections: İzmir Metro at Hilal

Construction
- Structure type: At-grade
- Accessible: yes

Other information
- Status: Open

History
- Opened: 1 July 1866
- Closed: 2001–13
- Rebuilt: 2012–13
- Electrified: 4 August 2013
- Former names: Istravoz (1866–1923)

Services
Preceding station	İZBAN	Following station
Alsancak towards Aliağa	Aliağa-Cumaovası	Kemer towards Cumaovası
Alsancak towards Menemen	Menemen-Tepeköy	Kemer towards Tepeköy
Alsancak towards Aliağa	Aliağa-Tepeköy (Late nights)	Kemer towards Tepeköy
Former services
Preceding station	Turkish State Railways	Following station
İzmir (Basmane) Terminus	Çiğli suburban	Halkapınar towards Çiğli
İzmir (Basmane) Terminus	Bornova suburban	Halkapınar towards Ege Üniversitesi
Location

Hilal railway station formerly Istravoz railway station is a railway station located in İzmir, Turkey. It is located east of Basmane next to the famous Hilal Junction on the Izmir-Afyon railway. The station was famous for being located next to the only diamond crossing in Turkey. The Oriental Railway Company's Alsancak-Aydın Main Line crossed with the Smyrna Cassaba Railway's Basmane-Afyon Main Line. Due to the layout of the tracks, the station was first named Istravoz railway station in 1866. Istravoz (from Greek σταυρóς) means Cross in Turkish. After the Republic of Turkey was formed in 1923, the station's name was changed to Hilal which means 'crescent', due to the majority of the city's population being Muslim. The Hilal metro station, which opened in 2000, is located adjacent to the railway station. When the electrification of the tracks around İzmir started in 2001, the station was closed.

Hilal station served the Hilal neighbourhood east of Basmane.

Since early 2011 there had been talk of reopening Hilal as a second transfer point between İZBAN and İzmir Metro. On 4 August 2013, the station reopened serving IZBAN commuter trains. Two new island platforms were built and the station now lies on the Izmir-Eğirdir railway instead of the Izmir-Afyon railway.

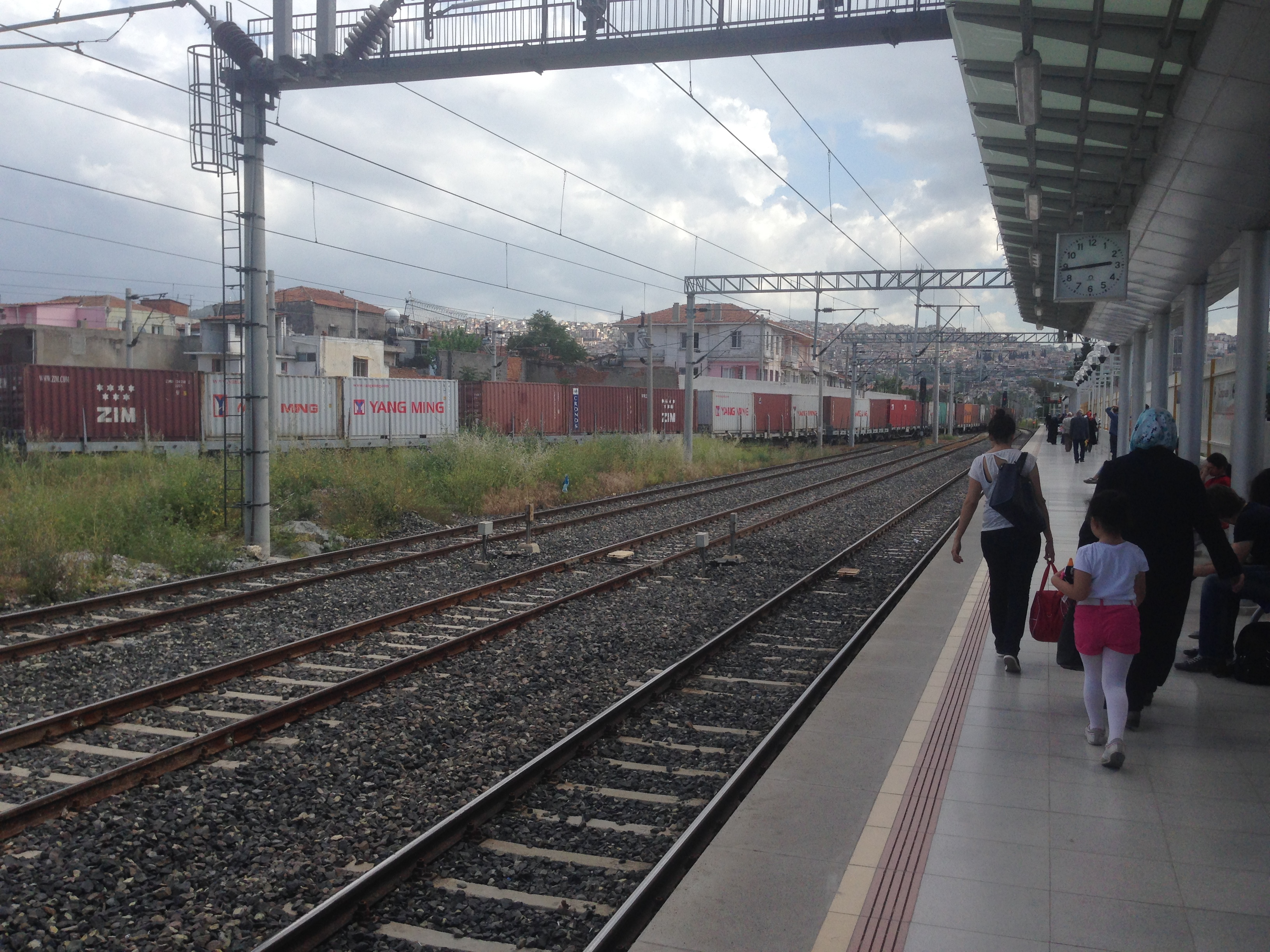
A freight train enterring the railway.
