= Şirinyer railway station =

Railway station in İzmir, Turkey

Şirinyer
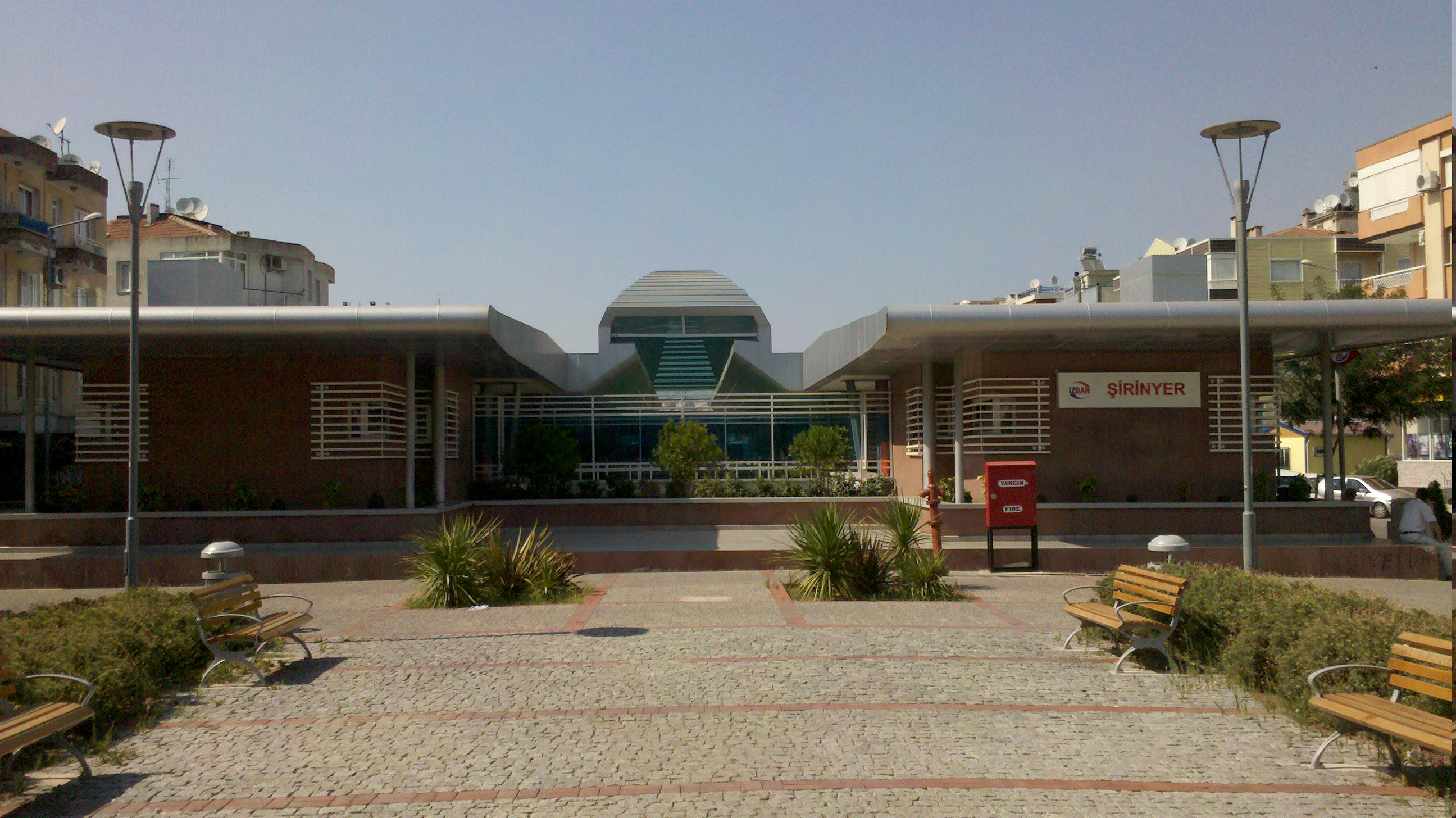
- Şirinyer İZBAN station in 2011.

General information
- Location: 133 Sk., İnkılap Mah. 35380; Buca, İzmir; Turkey
- Coordinates: 38.3918°N 27.1472°E
- System: İZBAN commuter rail station
- Owner: Turkish State Railways
- Operator: TCDD Transport; İZBAN A.Ş.
- Lines: İzmir-Eğirdir railway Buca branch (1866-2006)
- Platforms: 2 side platforms
- Tracks: 2
- Connections: ESHOT Bus: 36, 74, 206, 236, 418, 441, 466, 476, 671, 676, 805, 818, 838, 866, 871, 874, 875, 876, 878

Construction
- Structure type: Underground
- Accessible: Yes

Other information
- Status: In Operation

History
- Opened: 1858; 168 years ago
- Rebuilt: 2006–2009; 17 years ago
- Electrified: 2001; 25 years ago
- Former names: Kızılçullu Durağı; Paradiso

Services
| Preceding station | İZBAN | Following station |
|---|---|---|
| Kemer towards Aliağa | Aliağa-Cumaovası | Koşu towards Cumaovası |
| Kemer towards Aliağa | Aliağa-Tepeköy (Late nights) | Koşu towards Tepeköy |
| Kemer towards Menemen | Menemen-Tepeköy | Koşu towards Tepeköy |
Former services
| Preceding station | Turkish State Railways | Following station |
|---|---|---|
| Kemer towards İzmir (Alsancak) | Cumaovası suburban | Koşu towards Cumaovası |
| Kemer towards İzmir (Alsancak) | Buca suburban | Efeler towards Buca |
| Kemer towards İzmir (Basmane) | Buca suburban | Efeler towards Buca |
Location

Şirinyer railway station (Turkish: Şirinyer Tren İstasyonu) is an underground railway station of the İZBAN commuter rail system. The current station was built between 2006–09 and opened on 30 August 2010. The former station was opened in 1858 by the Ottoman Railway Company and was taken over by the Turkish State Railways in 1935. Before the 1950s, Şirinyer was known as Kızılçullu Durağı.

The proposed Üçyol—Fuar İzmir Line (M2 Line) of the İzmir Metro will have an underground station at Şirinyer. Construction of the station began in 2024 and is expected to be completed in 2027.

== Connections ==
ESHOT operates regional bus service, accessible from the station.

ESHOT Bus service
| Route number | Stop | Route | Location |
|---|---|---|---|
| 36 | Şirinyer İstasyonu | Şirinyer Aktarma Merkezi — Gümrük | Cemil Şeboy Street |
| 74 | Şirinyer İstasyonu | Yenigün Mah. — Şirinyer Aktarma Merkezi | Cemil Şeboy Street |
| 206 | Şirinyer İstasyonu | Şirinyer Aktarma Merkezi — Havalimanı | Cemil Şeboy Street |
| 236 | Şirinyer İstasyonu | Şirinyer Aktarma Merkezi — Gümrük | Cemil Şeboy Street |
| 418 | Şirinyer İstasyonu | Şirinyer Aktarma Merkezi — H. Pınar Metro | Cemil Şeboy Street |
| 441 | Şirinyer İstasyonu | Çınartepe — Şirinyer Aktarma Merkezi | Cemil Şeboy Street |
| 465 | Şirinyer İstasyonu | Tınaztepe — Konak | Cemil Şeboy Street |
| 466 | Şirinyer İstasyonu | Şirinyer Aktarma Merkezi — Konak | Cemil Şeboy Street |
| 471 | Şirinyer İstasyonu | Tınaztepe — Konak | Cemil Şeboy Street |
| 476 | Şirinyer İstasyonu | Tınaztepe — Şirinyer Aktarma Merkezi | Cemil Şeboy Street |
| 485 | Şirinyer İstasyonu | Gaziemir İlçe Terminali — Konak | Cemil Şeboy Street |
| 671 | Şirinyer İstasyonu | Şirinyer Aktarma Merkezi — F. Altay Aktarma Merkezi | Cemil Şeboy Street |
| 676 | Şirinyer İstasyonu | Tınaztepe — Şirinyer Aktarma Merkezi | Cemil Şeboy Street |
| 805 | Şirinyer İstasyonu | Çamlıkule — Şirinyer Aktarma Merkezi | Cemil Şeboy Street |
| 818 | Şirinyer İstasyonu | Esbaş Aktarma Merkezi — Şirinyer Aktarma Merkezi | Cemil Şeboy Street |
| 838 | Şirinyer İstasyonu | Şirinyer Aktarma Merkezi — Gümrük | Cemil Şeboy Street |
| 866 | Şirinyer İstasyonu | Buca Toplu Konutları — Şirinyer Aktarma Merkezi | Cemil Şeboy Street |
| 871 | Şirinyer İstasyonu | İşçievleri — Şirinyer Aktarma Merkezi | Cemil Şeboy Street |
| 874 | Şirinyer İstasyonu | İzkent — Şirinyer Aktarma Merkezi | Cemil Şeboy Street |
| 875 | Şirinyer İstasyonu | Evka 1 — Şirinyer Aktarma Merkezi | Cemil Şeboy Street |
| 876 | Şirinyer İstasyonu | Şirinkapı — Şirinyer Aktarma Merkezi | Cemil Şeboy Street |
| 878 | Şirinyer İstasyonu | Tınaztepe — Şirinyer Aktarma Merkezi | Cemil Şeboy Street |
