= Koşu railway station =

Koşu
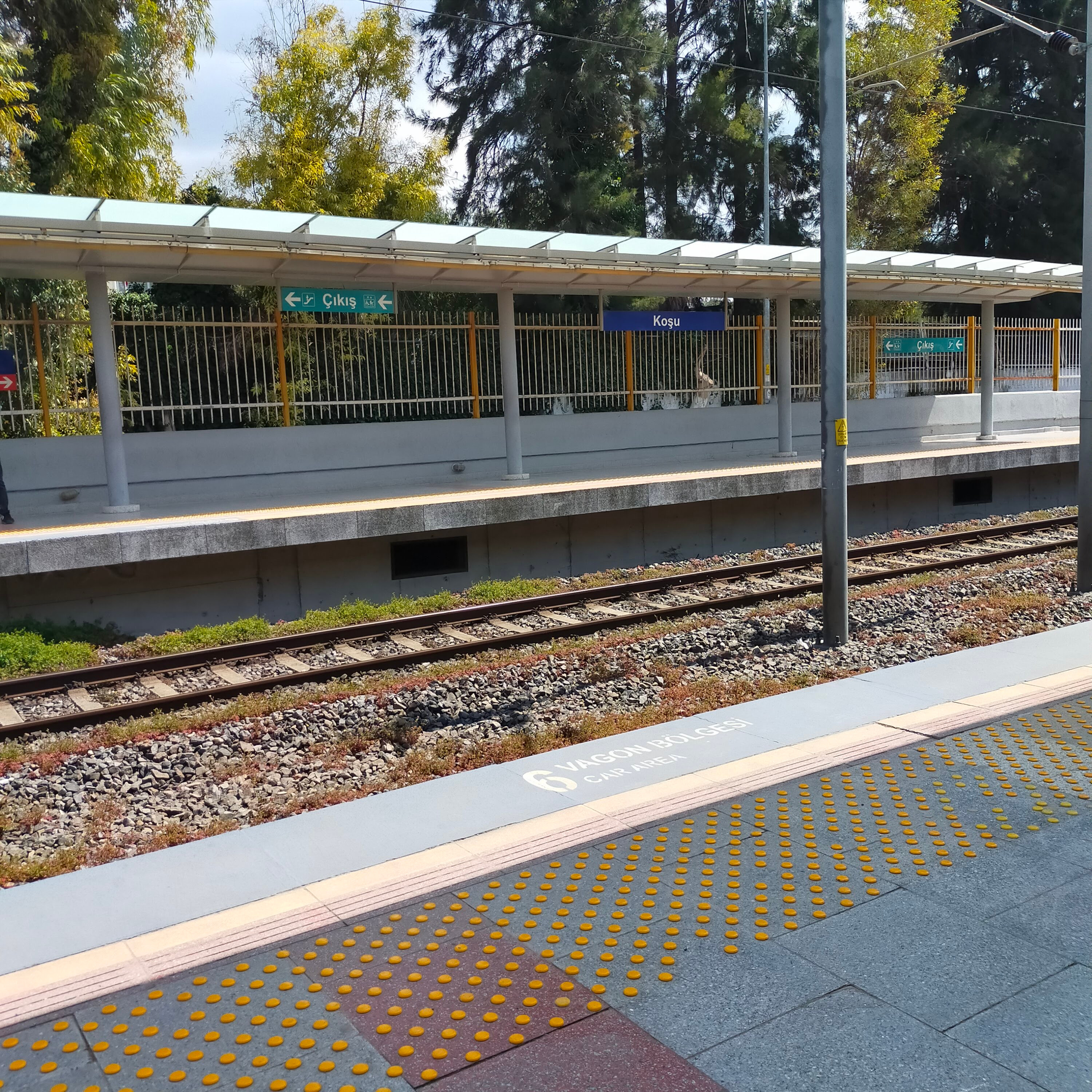

General information
- Location: Aydın Hatboyu Cd., Akıncılar Mah. 35380; Buca, İzmir; Turkey
- Coordinates: 38.3834°N 27.1474°E
- System: İZBAN commuter rail station
- Owner: Turkish State Railways
- Operator: TCDD Transport; İZBAN A.Ş.
- Line: İzmir-Eğirdir railway
- Platforms: 2 side platforms
- Tracks: 2
- Connections: ESHOT: 105, 107, 233, 417, 484, 671

Construction
- Structure type: At-grade
- Accessible: Yes

Other information
- Status: Open

History
- Rebuilt: 2009
- Electrified: 2001
- Former names: Koşu Durağı

Services
| Preceding station | İZBAN | Following station |
|---|---|---|
| Şirinyer towards Aliağa | Aliağa-Cumaovası | İnkılap towards Cumaovası |
| Şirinyer towards Aliağa | Aliağa-Tepeköy (Late nights) | İnkılap towards Tepeköy |
| Şirinyer towards Menemen | Menemen-Tepeköy | İnkılap towards Tepeköy |
Location

Koşu railway station is a railway station in İzmir, Turkey. The station is served by İZBAN, the commuter rail operator of İzmir. Koşu was built in 1970 as a station servicing the nearby Hippodrome. Koşu was rebuilt in 2009.

== Connections ==
Koşu is serviced by several bus services. The stop is located on Aydın Hatboyu Street.

ESHOT Bus service
| Route number | Stop | Route | Location |
|---|---|---|---|
| 105 | İzban Koşu Durağı | Çamlıkule — Konak | Aydın Hatboyu Street |
| 171 | İzban Koşu Durağı | Tınaztepe — Konak | Aydın Hatboyu Street |
| 233 | İzban Koşu Durağı | Esbaş Aktarma Merkezi — Konak | Aydın Hatboyu Street |
| 417 | İzban Koşu Durağı | Buca Koop — Koşu Aktarma Merkezi | Aydın Hatboyu Street |
| 484 | İzban Koşu Durağı | Yeşilbağlar — Konak | Aydın Hatboyu Street |
| 671 | İzban Koşu Durağı | Şirinyer Aktarma Merkezi — F. Altay Aktarma Merkezi | Aydın Hatboyu Street |
