= Alsancak Shuttle =

Alsancak-Halkapınar Shuttle
Overview
- Service type: Commuter rail
- Status: Operating
- Locale: İzmir
- First service: June 10, 2012
- Current operator(s): İZBAN

Route
- Termini: Alsancak; Halkapınar
- Stops: 2
- Distance travelled: 3 km (1.86 mi)
- Average journey time: 5 minutes
- Service frequency: Every 10 minutes (Rush hour); Every 12 minutes (other times)

On-board services
- Disabled access: Yes

Technical
- Rolling stock: E22000
- Track gauge: 1,435 mm (4 ft 8 1/2 in) standard gauge
- Electrification: 25 kV AC
- Operating speed: 60 km/h (37 mph)
- Track owner(s): İZBAN

The Alsancak–Halkapınar Shuttle (Turkish: Alsancak–Halkapınar Ring Treni, Alsancak–Halkapınar Ring Train) is a shuttle train operated by İZBAN to service Alsancak Terminal. As of June 10, 2012, İZBAN's mainline will temporarily bypass Alsancak, due to the construction of a new transfer station near Hilal. Until the station is complete, shuttle trains will operate every 10–12 minutes between Alsancak and Halkapınar, where passengers can transfer to other trains.
