= Kemer railway station =

Railway station in İzmir, Turkey

Kemer
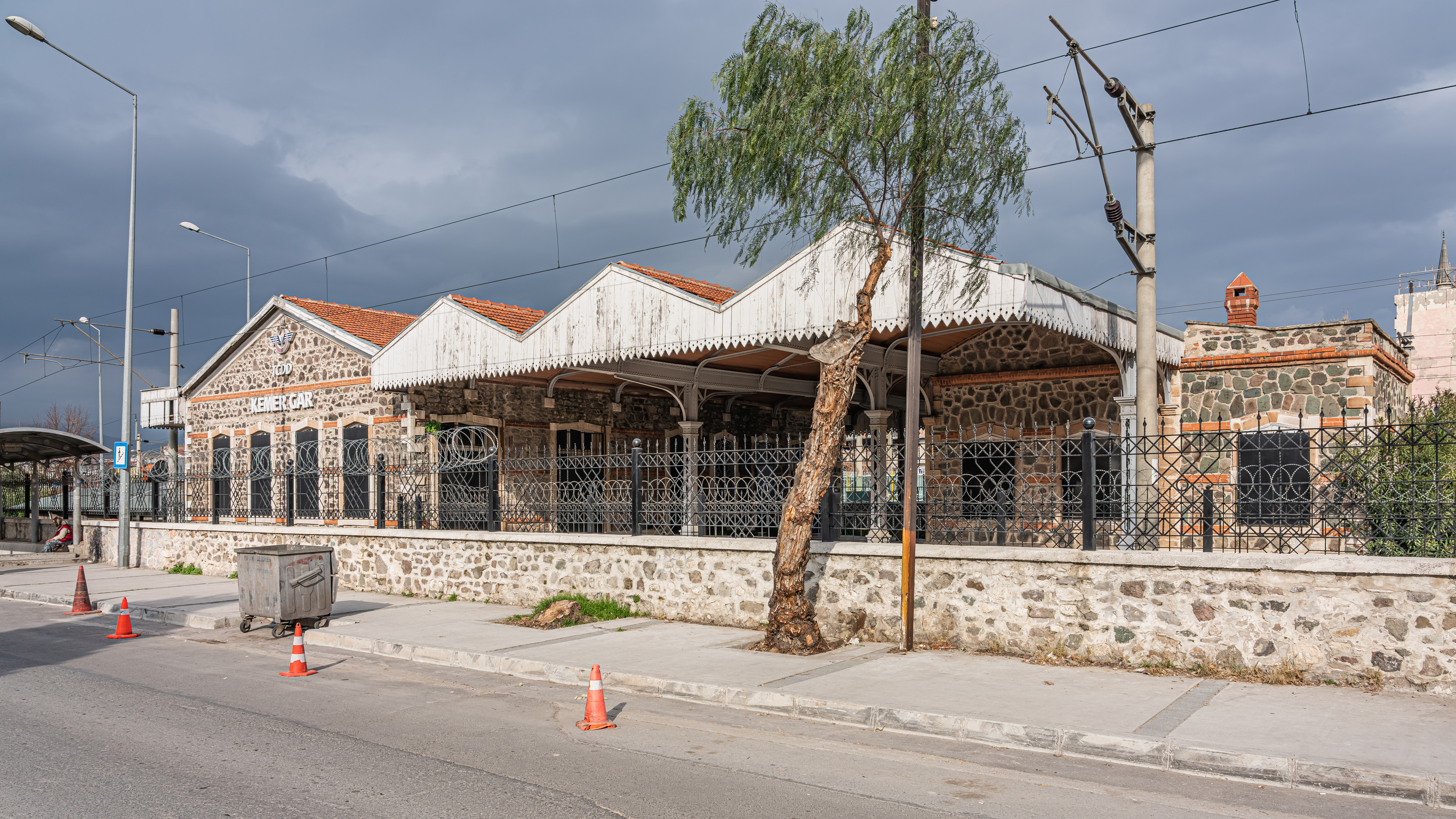
- The station house.

General information
- Location: 1196 Sk. 4, Yenidoğan Mah. 35180; Konak, İzmir; Turkey
- Coordinates: 38.4219°N 27.1557°E
- System: İZBAN commuter rail station
- Owner: Turkish State Railways
- Operator: TCDD Transport; İZBAN A.Ş.
- Line: İzmir-Eğirdir railway
- Platforms: 2 side platform
- Tracks: 3
- Connections: ESHOT Bus: 34, 39, 41, 42, 46, 54, 57, 58, 59, 60, 64, 117, 153, 214, 249, 367, 418, 466, 662, 699, 838

Construction
- Accessible: Yes

Other information
- Status: In Operation

History
- Opened: 1857
- Closed: 2006-10
- Rebuilt: 2008-10
- Electrified: 2001

Services
Preceding station	İZBAN	Following station
Hilal towards Aliağa	Aliağa-Cumaovası	Şirinyer towards Cumaovası
Hilal towards Aliağa	Aliağa-Tepeköy (Late nights)	Şirinyer towards Tepeköy
Hilal towards Menemen	Menemen-Tepeköy	Şirinyer towards Tepeköy
Former services
Preceding station	Turkish State Railways	Following station
İzmir (Alsancak) Terminus	Cumaovası suburban	Şirinyer towards Cumaovası
İzmir (Alsancak) Terminus	Buca suburban	Şirinyer towards Buca
İzmir (Basmane) Terminus	Buca suburban	Şirinyer towards Buca
Location

Kemer railway station (Turkish: Kemer İstasyonu) is a railway station in İzmir. The station is the oldest railway station in Turkey, built in 1857. İZBAN operates commuter trains north to Aliağa and Menemen and south to Cumaovası and Tepeköy.

== History ==
In 1856 the Ottoman Empire granted a concession to an English company to build a railway from İzmir to Aydın. The Ottoman Railway Company (ORC) started construction in late 1856 and completed a 2.17 km (1.35 mi) line, from the start at Alsancak to Kemer. Kemer station was opened in 1857 as Caravan Bridge (Turkish: Kervan Köprüsü), named after a nearby ancient bridge with the same name. Kemer was chosen to be the main freight depot of the ORC in İzmir. When the railway reached the town of Torbalı in 1860, the first trains started to operate on the line. Freight trains carrying mainly figs, would unload at Kemer depot and would be distributed in İzmir via horse pulled wagons. Freight trains from the south as well as horse pulled caravans from the east and north would unload at Kemer. In its early years Kemer station was the main freight depot in İzmir. When the railway reached Aydın in 1866, most freight would be unloaded in Alsancak. The Turkish State Railways became the new owners of the station in 1935, when they bought the ORC. The station was renamed as Kemer around that time. The station was electrified with 25 kV AC catenary in 2001. In 2006 the station was closed to passenger traffic and rebuilt in 2008, to be re-opened to service in 2010.

== Connections ==
ESHOT operates regional bus service, accessible from the station.

ESHOT Bus service
Route number	Stop	Route	Location
34	Kemer Aktarma Merkezi	Esentepe — Gümrük	Kemer Terminal
39	Kemer Aktarma Merkezi	İsmetpaşa Mah. — Gümrük	Kemer Terminal
41	Kemer Aktarma Merkezi	Levent — Gümrük	Kemer Terminal
42	Kemer Aktarma Merkezi	Çınartepe — Gümrük	Kemer Terminal
46	Kemer Aktarma Merkezi	Çobançeşme — Gümrük	Kemer Terminal
54	Kemer Aktarma Merkezi	Otogar — Kemer Aktarma Merkezi	Kemer Terminal
57	Kemer Aktarma Merkezi	Altındağ — Kemer Aktarma Merkezi	Kemer Terminal
58	Kemer Aktarma Merkezi	Kandere — Kemer Aktarma Merkezi	Kemer Terminal
59	Kemer Aktarma Merkezi	Bornova Metro — Kemer Aktarma Merkezi	Kemer Terminal
60	Kemer Aktarma Merkezi	Pınarbaşı — Kemer Aktarma Merkezi	Kemer Terminal
64	Kemer Aktarma Merkezi	Ayakkabıcılar Sit. — Kemer Aktarma Merkezi	Kemer Terminal
117	Kemer Aktarma Merkezi	Kavaklıdere — Kemer Aktarma Merkezi	Kemer Terminal
153	Kemer Aktarma Merkezi	Çamkule — Kemer Akrarma Merkezi	Kemer Terminal
214	Kemer Aktarma Merkezi	Evka3 Metro — Kemer	Kemer Terminal
249	Kemer Aktarma Merkezi	Evka 4 — Kemer	Kemer Terminal
367	Kemer Aktarma Merkezi	Ümit Mah. — Kemer Akrarma Merkezi	Kemer Terminal
418	Kemer Aktarma Merkezi	Şirinyer Aktarma Merkezi — H. Pınar Metro	Kemer Terminal
466	Kemer Aktarma Merkezi	Şirinyer Aktarma Merkezi — Konak	Kemer Terminal
662	Kemer Aktarma Merkezi	Cengizhan — Kemer	Kemer Terminal
699	Kemer Aktarma Merkezi	M.Erener — Kemer	Kemer Terminal
838	Kemer Aktarma Merkezi	Şirinyer Aktarma Merkezi — Gümrük	Kemer Terminal

== See also ==
- Alsancak Terminal
- Turkish State Railways
- Ottoman Railway Company
