= Buca =

- District and municipality
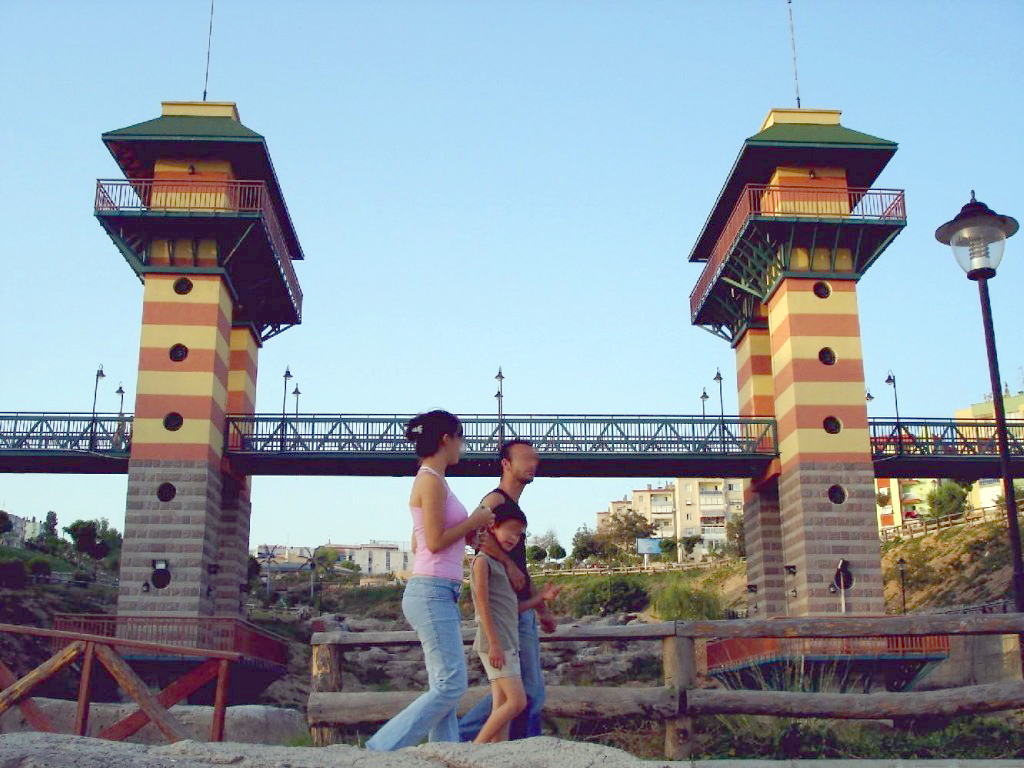
- Yedi Göller (Seven Lakes) Park

- Logo

- Map showing Buca District in İzmir Province

- Location within Turkey Location within İzmir
- Coordinates: 38°21′N 27°10′E
- Country: Turkey
- Province: İzmir

Government
  - Mayor: Görkem DUMAN (CHP)
- Area: 178 km^{2} (69 sq mi)
- Population (2024): 523,193
  - Density: 2,940/km^{2} (7,610/sq mi)
- Time zone: UTC+3 (TRT)
- Area code: 0232
- Website: www.buca.bel.tr

Buca (/buːdʒə/, Turkish pronunciation: [budʒa]) is a municipality and district of İzmir Province, Turkey. Its area is 178 km^{2}, and its population is 523,193 (2024). It is the biggest district of İzmir Province as terms of population. It covers the southeastern part of the agglomeration of İzmir and the adjacent countryside.

== History ==
Buca was one of the preferred settlement areas of İzmir's community of Levantines. The great mansions they built in the 19th century stand to this day, most of them restored.

The district center is situated slightly inland like the district of Bornova with which it shares important points in common, and on the higher ground that commands the southern shores of the tip of the Gulf of İzmir. Buca existed from the Byzantine times and was inhabited by Greeks, mainly farmers. However, Buca started to develop as of the end of the 17th century when the French consulate in İzmir moved there following the 1676 plague and the 1688 Smyrna earthquake that seriously shook İzmir's core as an international trade center. Its rich Levantine residents who acquired the surrounding vineyards typically had Latin backgrounds, as opposed to those who originally came from Britain and who preferred Bornova. But in the case both of Bornova and of Buca, the concentration in terms of ethnic backgrounds was far from having an exclusive nature. Yet, in 1770, following the failure of the Orlov Revolt, a revolt of the Greeks in today's Greece against the Ottoman occupation encouraged by the Russian Nobles Orlov in 1770 (during the Russo-Turkish War (1768–1774)), many Greeks from the revolted regions fled from Peloponnese, Chios, Andros, and Kythira and settled in Buca, contributing to the growth of the place.

Later, in 1861, when the railway reached Buca from Smyrna, many rich Europeans from Smyrna built their summer houses in Buca. Yet, due to its substantial growth, Buca soon became a suburb of Smyrna and people started to stay there permanently. At the beginning of the 20th century, there were three Greek Orthodox churches, two Greek community schools (one for males, one for females) as well as some private Greek schools also, while there were two private English schools, one catholic nonnes' school and one Capuchin monks school. . However, Greek inhabitants were expulsed in 1922 and fled to Greece, where they named their new settlement "Neos Voutzas" (meaning "New Buca"), close to Athens. As a result, there are today only a Catholic and a Baptist church in service in Buca. Many of the 19th-century houses have been restored and are still being used either by public institutions or by private persons, although many still need care. The core area of Buca could preserve its traditional architectural tissue based on two-storey residences, while apartment blocks mushroomed in its extensions, as it is the case in all localities in Turkey which had to absorb immigration. There are a number of municipal parks, notably a vast ongoing project that comprises seven artificial lakes.

NATO's Allied Land Command headquarters was established in Buca in 2012.

== Composition ==
There are 48 neighbourhoods in Buca District:

Map without text (SVG)

- 29 Ekim
- Adatepe
- Akıncılar
- Atatürk
- Aydoğdu
- Barış
- Belenbaşı
- Bucakoop
- Çağdaş
- Çaldıran
- Çamlık
- Çamlıkule
- Çamlıpınar
- Cumhuriyet
- Dicle
- Doğancılar
- Dumlupınar
- Efeler
- Fırat
- Gaziler
- Göksu
- Güven
- Hürriyet
- Inkılap
- İnönü
- İzkent
- Karacaağaç
- Karanfil
- Kaynaklar Cumhuriyet
- Kaynaklar Merkez
- Kırklar
- Kozağaç
- Kuruçeşme
- Laleli
- Menderes
- Murathan
- Mustafa Kemal
- Seyhan
- Şirinkapı
- Ufuk
- Vali Rahmi Bey
- Yaylacık
- Yenigün
- Yeşilbağlar
- Yiğitler
- Yıldız
- Yıldızlar
- Zafer

Map with text (PNG)

39 of the neighbourhoods are urban, 9 are rural.

== Education ==
Dokuz Eylül University, one of the two larger universities in İzmir, has its main campus located in Buca, in the locality called Tınaztepe (built from 1997 onwards). While the university has dependencies scattered all over İzmir, it is largely associated with Buca; in the same way as the other large university, Ege University, is associated with Bornova. A private university, İzmir Tınaztepe University is also located in Buca, unrelated to Dokuz Eylul University despite being in the near vicinity.

== Healthcare ==
Public healthcare needs of the district is primarily provided by Buca Seyfi Demirsoy Hospital and its maternity hospital, affiliated to İzmir Democracy University Medical School. Izmir Tınaztepe University operates Tınaztepe Hospital and Buca Medical Center, as well as a dental hospital. A public dental hospital in the district is under construction.

== Hippodrome ==
The hippodrome of İzmir is located in Buca, in the quarter named Şirinyer along the road to İzmir metropolitan center, and the hippodrome is known under the name of this quarter (as Şirinyer Hipodromu). Şirinyer area used to be called Kızılçullu, in reference to a legend according to which Tamerlane would have established his headquarters here during his 1402 siege of İzmir ("Kızılçullu" meaning "red horseclothes"), and Buca's Levantine population, who owned orchards and vineyards here, had named the area under the no less assumptive name of Paradiso.

== Transportation ==
Rail transportation needs are provided by three İZBAN stations located on the İzmir–Eğirdir railway, passing through the far-western edge of Buca: Şirinyer, Koşu, and İnkılap. There is currently a İzmir Metro line -the Buca Metro- under construction, most of which is located inside the district boundaries. The new line is expected to replace most of the ESHOT bus lines originating from Tınaztepe and Şirinyer depots.

== Notable people ==
Çevik Bir, the retired Turkish general who was the force commander of during the United Nations' Operation Restore Hope in Somalia and an influential figure in Turkey's politics and diplomacy in the 1990s, is from Buca and a public square is named after him.

The Swedish naturalist Fredrik Hasselquist (1722–1752) died in Buca.

== See also ==
- Cemil Şeboy
- Dokuz Eylül University
- Levantine mansions of Smyrna

== Gallery ==
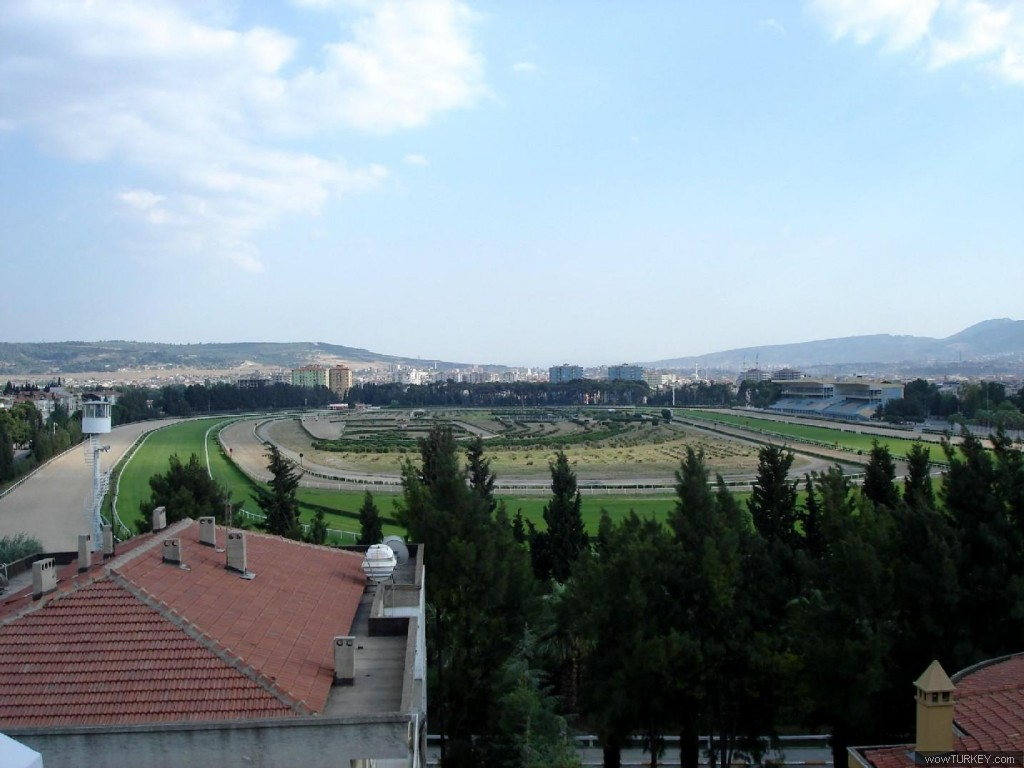
Hippodrome of İzmir in Şirinyer, Buca

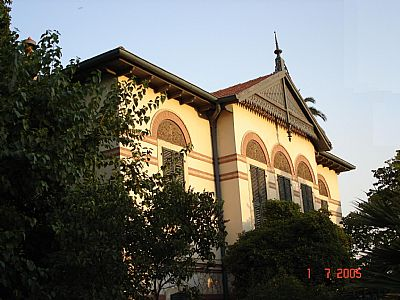
19th century Levantine house in Buca

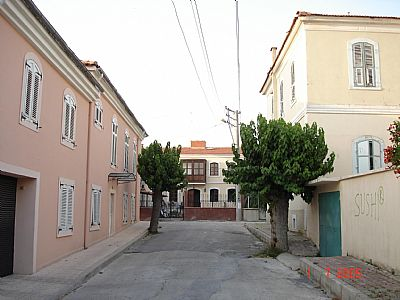
Buca street with old houses

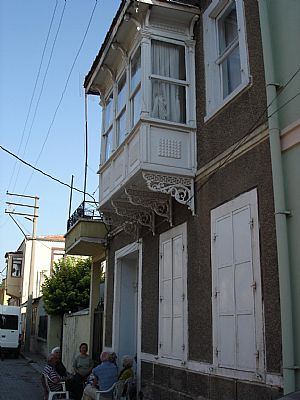
Easygoing lifestyle in Buca

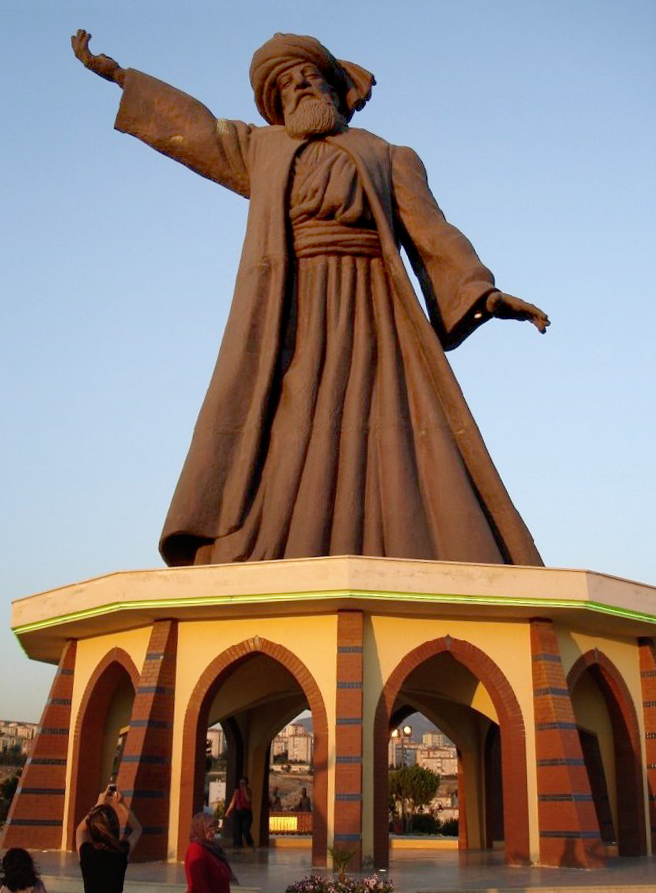
23 meters high statue of Mevlana in Buca
