= İZBAN E22100 =

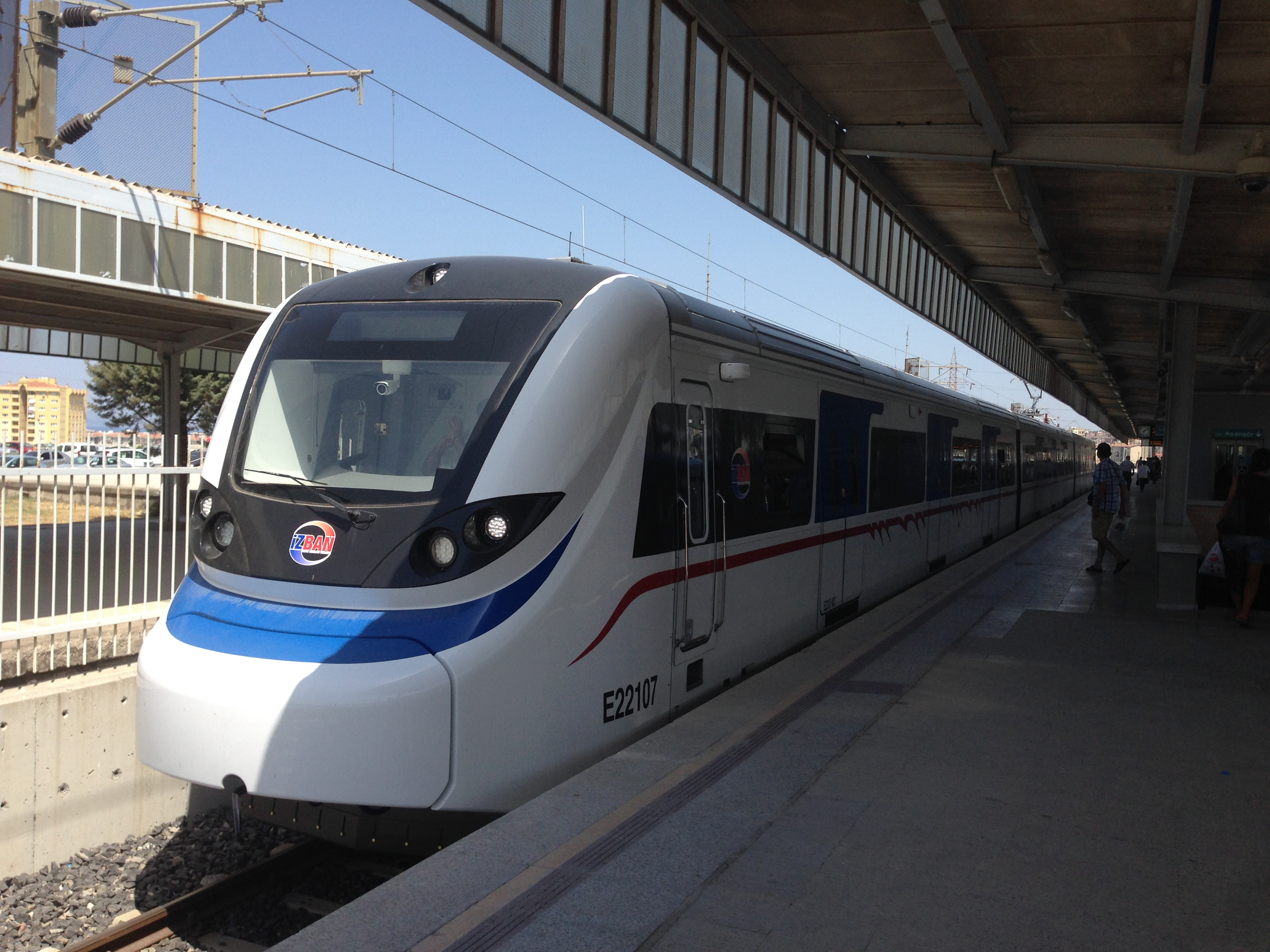
- E22107 at Aliağa railway station.
- In service: 2014-present
- Manufacturer: Hyundai Rotem
- Constructed: 2012-2015
- Entered service: 2014
- Number built: 40
- Number in service: 40
- Formation: 3 cars
- Fleet numbers: 22101-22140
- Operators: TCDD Transport; İZBAN A.Ş.
- Depots: Çiğli depot (İzmir), Cumaovası yard, Aliağa station siding, Menemen station siding
- Lines served: İZBAN

Specifications
- Maximum speed: 140 km/h (87 mph)
- Power supply: Pantograph
- Electric system(s): 25 kV, 50 Hz AC
- Track gauge: 1,435 mm / 4 ft 8 1/2 in standard gauge

The İZBAN E22100 series, commonly nicknamed Gulf dolphin (Turkish: Körfez Yunusu), are Electric Multiple Units that were built by Hyundai Rotem for İZBAN A.Ş. in order to increase its fleet. Each set has 3 permanently coupled cars and are used for commuter service in İzmir. The first set entered service on 30 August 2014 and the last one (40th) on 31 December 2015.
