= TCDD 2201 Class =

2201 class
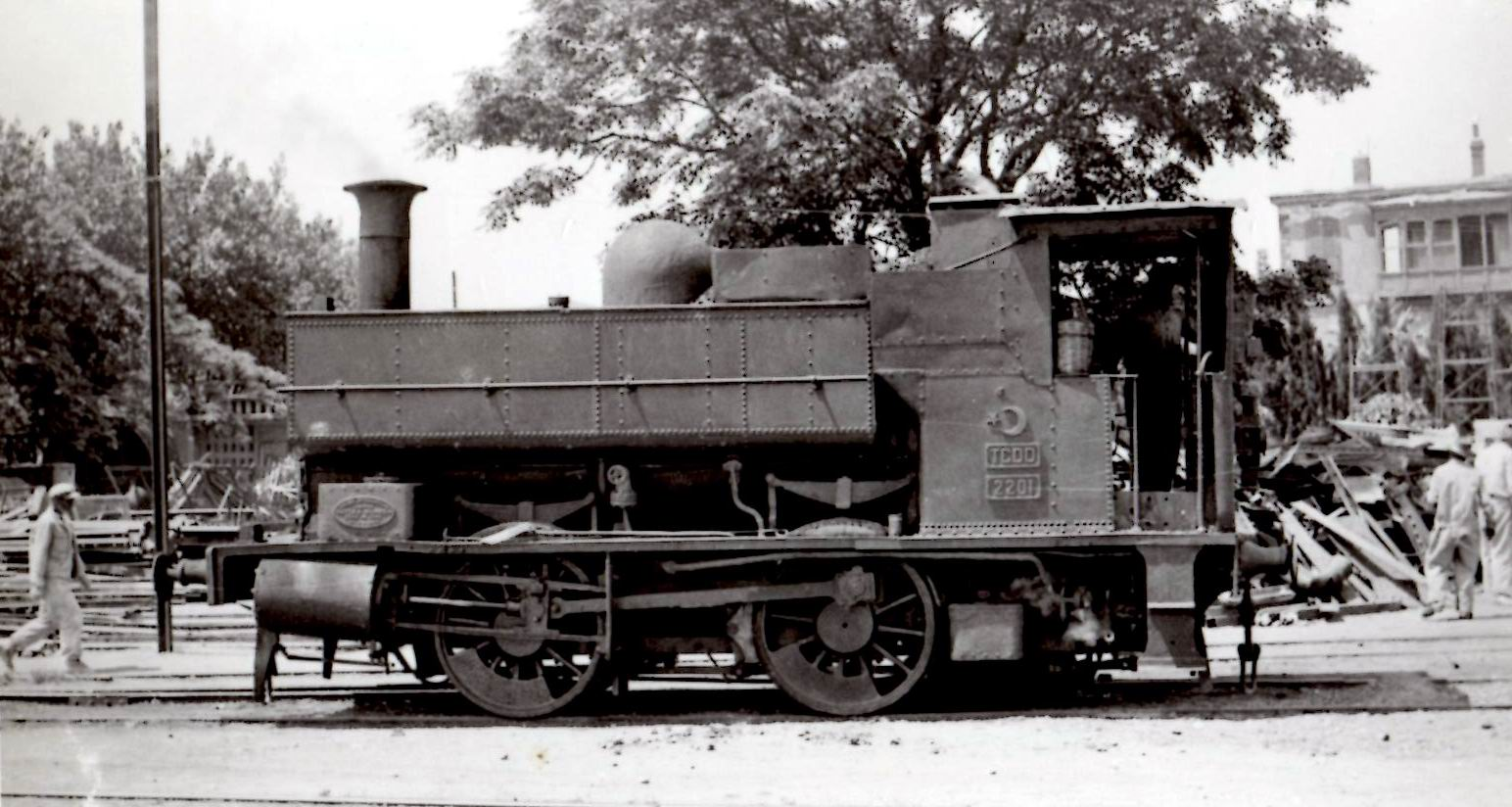
- TCDD 2201
Type and origin
- Power type: Steam
- Builder: Sharp, Stewart and Company
- Serial number: 3502-3505
- Build date: 1889
- Total produced: 4
Specifications
- Configuration
  - Whyte: 0-4-0ST
  - UIC: B't
- Gauge: 1,435 mm (4 ft 8 1/2 in)
- Driver dia.: 1,231 mm (4 ft 0.5 in)
- Loco weight: 31 t (30.5 long tons; 34.2 short tons)
- Fuel type: coal
- Firebox
  - Grate area: 1 square metre (11 sq ft)
- Boiler pressure: 9.5 bars (138 psi)
- Heating surface: 65 square metres (700 sq ft)
- Cylinders: 2, outside
- Cylinder size: 381 by 558 millimetres (15 in × 22 in)
Performance figures
- Tractive effort: 3,750 kilograms-force (8,300 lbf)
Career
- Number in class: 4
- Numbers: 2201-2204 ex ORC 36-39
- Disposition: All scrapped

The Turkish State Railways (TCDD) 2201 Class was a class of 0-4-0ST steam locomotives.

They were built by Sharp, Stewart and Company of Manchester, England for the Ottoman Railway Company and were later taken over by TCDD. The four examples in this class were numbered 36–39, later 2201–2204. The first arrived in 1889. At least two, 2201 and 2204, were still in service in 1955 and 2202 was reported to be scrapped in 1956.
