= Cemil Şeboy =

Turkish politician

Cemil Şeboy (born 1953 in Buca, İzmir Turkey) is the former mayor of Buca District of İzmir Province, Turkey.
