= Eğirdir railway station =

Oriental Railway Company station

Eğirdir

General information
- Coordinates: 37.8760°N 30.8232°E
- Owner: TCDD
- Platforms: 1
- Tracks: 1

History
- Opened: 1912
- Closed: 2003
Location

Eğirdir station (Turkish: Eğirdir garı) in Eğirdir, Turkey, was the terminal station of the Oriental Railway Company (ORC) main line from İzmir.

The station was never meant to be a terminal station because the ORC intended to extend the line to Konya.

Built in 1912, the station was closed in 2003.
