= İzmir Tınaztepe University =

Private university in Turkey

- İzmir Tınaztepe Üniversitesi
- Motto: Gelecek Sende
- Motto in English: The Future is on You
- Type: Foundation (non-profit)
- Established: 18 May 2018; 8 years ago
- Affiliations: CHE
- Rector: Mustafa Güvençer
- Location: Buca, İzmir, Turkey; 38°24′27″N 27°11′43″E
- Campus: Urban, 102 decares (25 acres)
- Language: Turkish
- Colors: Blue and white
- Website: tinaztepe.edu.tr

İzmir Tınaztepe University (IZTU) (Turkish: İzmir Tınaztepe Üniversitesi) is a private university in İzmir, Turkey. The university is teaching on the field of health sciences.

== History ==
İzmir Tınaztepe University was founded by Ses Health, Education and Sports Foundation on 18 May 2018, with the Law numbered 7141 which was published on the Resmî Gazete. There are three faculties, a vocational school and an institute within the university. The university had started education and training on 2020-2021 academic year. İzmir Tınaztepe University had given its first graduates on 24 June 2022, from the Vocational School of Health Services and the Graduate School.

== Academics ==
=== Faculties ===
- School of Medicine
- Faculty of Dentistry
- Faculty of Health Sciences

=== Vocational Schools ===
- Vocational School of Health Services

=== Institutes ===
- Graduate School
