= Alsancak railway station =

Railway station in Konak, İzmir, Turkey

Alsancak
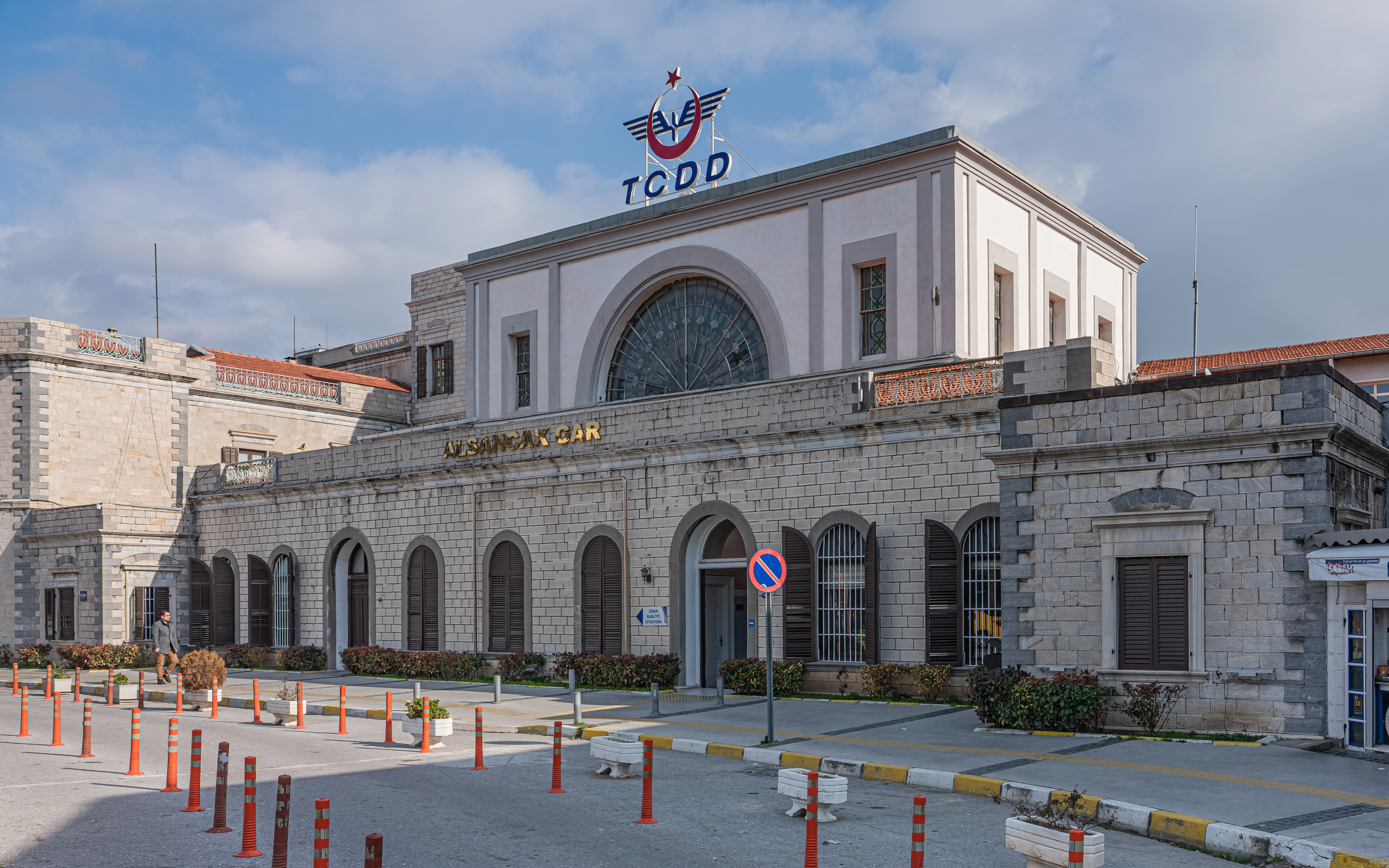
- Exterior of İzmir Alsancak Terminal

General information
- Location: Konak, Şehitler Cd, 2-10, 35230 Umurbey, İzmir
- Coordinates: 38°26′20″N 27°08′55″E
- System: İZBAN commuter rail station
- Owner: Turkish State Railways
- Line: İzmir-Eğirdir railway
- Platforms: 6
- Tracks: 10
- Connections: Tram İzmir at Alsancak Gar; ESHOT: 121, 253, 912, 920, 930, 963

Construction
- Structure type: At-grade terminal
- Depth: 0.75 metres (2 ft 6 in)
- Parking: Yes
- Cycle facilities: Yes
- Accessible: Yes
- Architectural style: Late Ottoman

Other information
- Station code: 3515

History
- Opened: 30 October 1858
- Closed: 2006-2010
- Rebuilt: 2001
- Electrified: 2001 (25 kV AC)
- Former names: Punta

Passengers
- 2011: 1,483,999 (İZBAN)

Services
Preceding station	İZBAN	Following station
Reverses direction	Aliağa-Cumaovası	Halkapınar towards Aliağa
Reverses direction	Aliağa-Cumaovası	Hilal towards Cumaovası
Reverses direction	Menemen-Tepeköy	Halkapınar towards Menemen
Reverses direction	Menemen-Tepeköy	Hilal towards Tepeköy
Reverses direction	Aliağa-Tepeköy (Late nights)	Halkapınar towards Aliağa
Reverses direction	Aliağa-Tepeköy (Late nights)	Hilal towards Tepeköy
Former services
Preceding station	Turkish State Railways	Following station
Terminus	Cumaovası suburban	Kemer towards Cumaovası
Terminus	Buca suburban	Kemer towards Buca
Location

Alsancak railway station (Turkish: Alsancak Garı) is one of the two main railway terminals in İzmir and is the second-oldest railway station in Turkey, after Kemer, being completed in 1858. The station serves İZBAN trains. İZBAN operates commuter trains north to Aliağa and Menemen and south to Cumaovası and Tepeköy.

== History ==
İzmir was a primary trade city during the 19th century and still is today. The main industry of the area was agriculture. However it took caravans days to transport the goods from the fields to the port. So, the Ottoman Empire gave a concession to a British company to build a railway from Aydın to İzmir, on 22 September 1856. The Ottoman Railway Company (ORC) was formed on that day.

=== Ottoman Railway Company era (1856–1935) ===
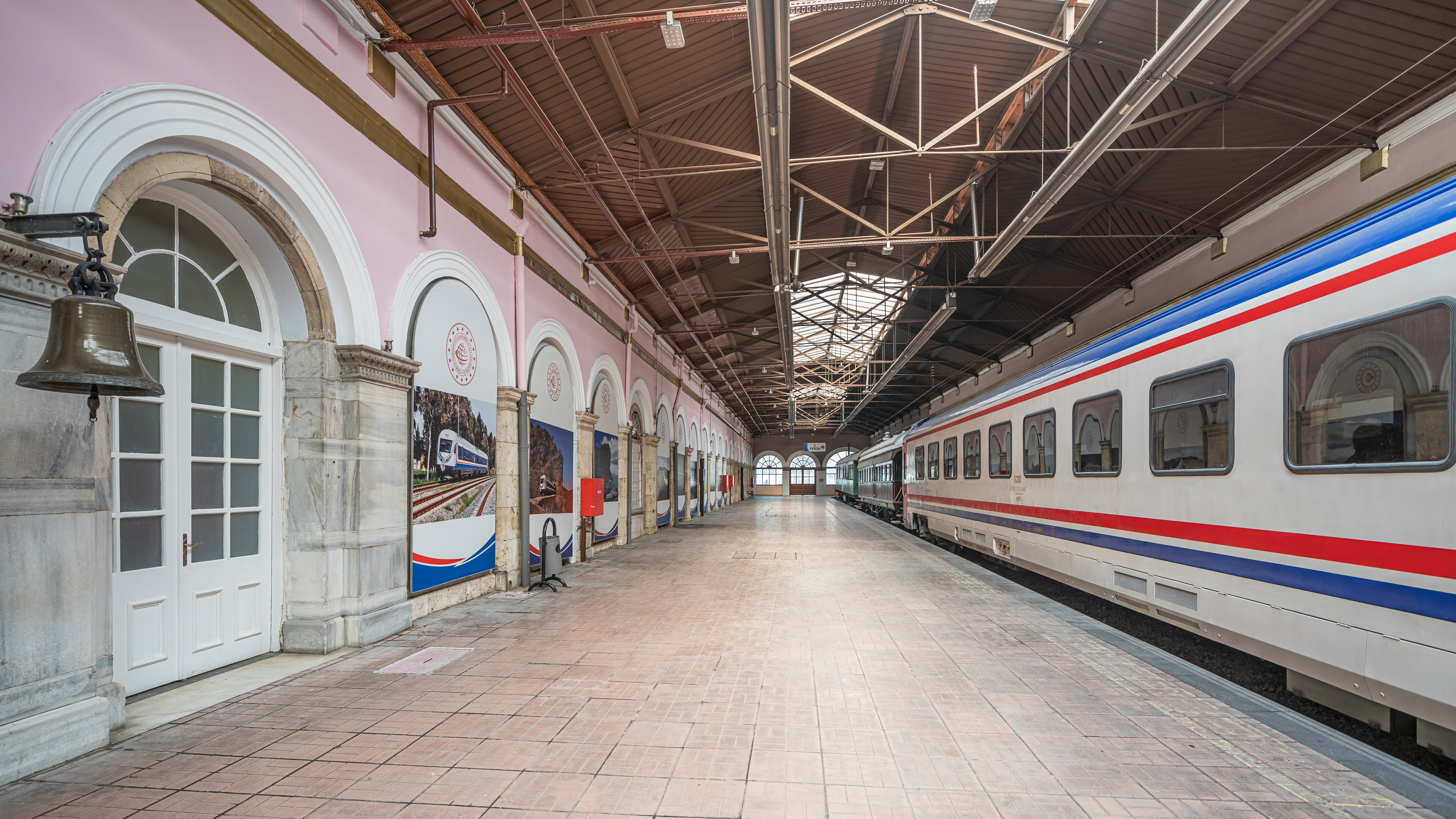
A historical platform of Alsancak Terminal

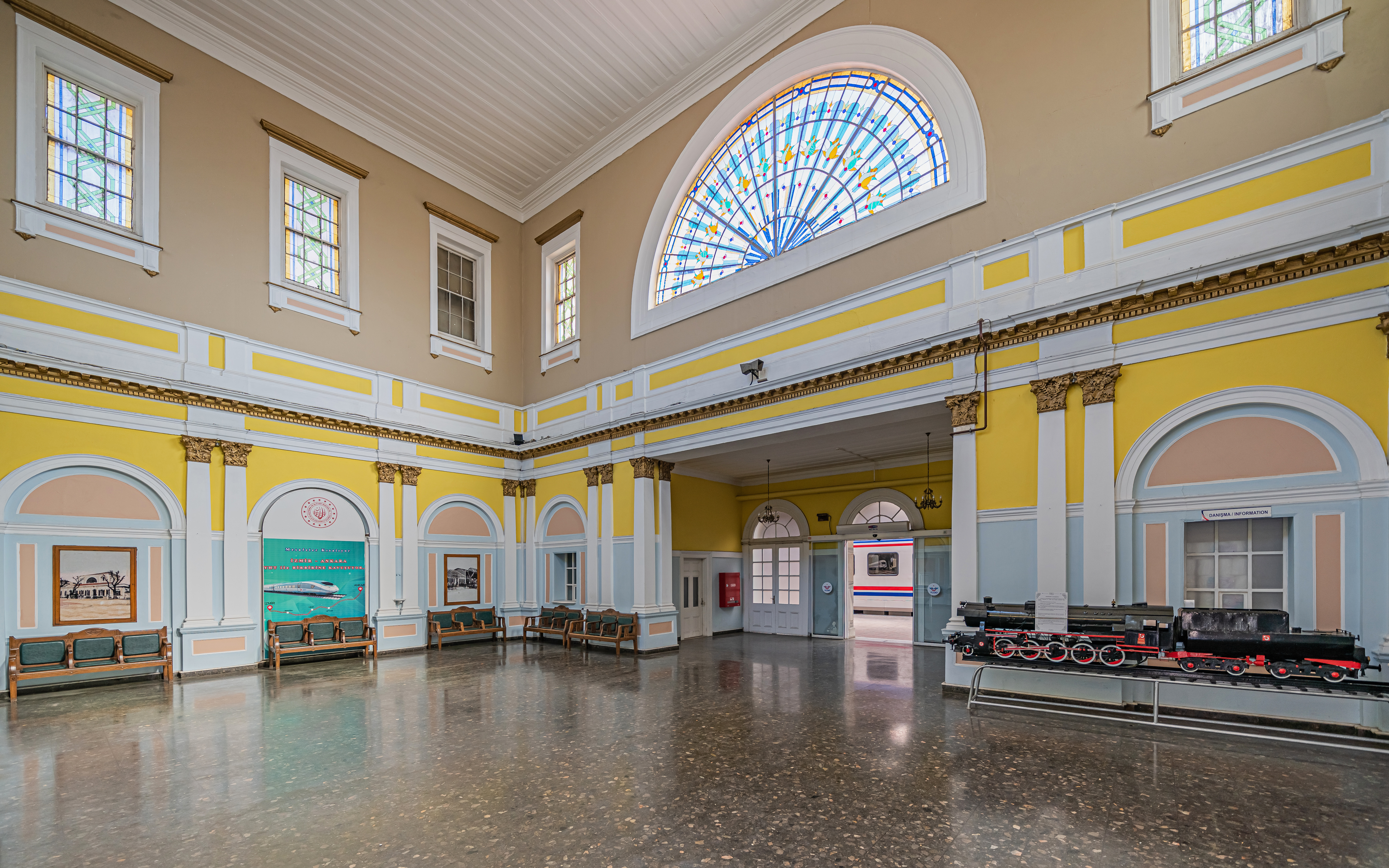
The former waiting room

The Ottoman Railway Company chose to start their line in the neighborhood of Alsancak, near the docks. The original station consisted of a small building with a few tracks and a small depot. The station opened on 30 October 1858 when the railway reached Gaziemir and Seydiköy. Passenger traffic was low and the few freight trains that operated, unloaded at Kemer. The railway reached Aydın in 1866 and the ORC opened the whole line on 1 July 1866. When this line opened, freight traffic was too heavy for Kemer to handle and the ORC needed a larger depot. More tracks were added, maintenance depots, train sheds and freight depots were built as well as the Alsancak dock being considerably extended. Also a lot of rich foreign and Ottoman business leviathans lived in İzmir, mainly in Bornova, Şirinyer and Buca. The railway could help them commute to work in Alsancak and back to their homes. Passenger traffic increased once the Şirinyer-Buca branch was opened, in 1870 and a new station was needed to be built for these rich families. In 1871 a new, bigger station with a clock tower was opened. This clock tower became the first in İzmir. Today, this building is the headquarters of District 3.

In 1890s a tram line was opened from the dock in Pasaport to Alsancak station, traveling up the Kordon waterfront. This line was connected to the tracks at the station and passengers would board horse-pulled trams from Pasaport to Alsancak station to board intercity trains in the day. At night freight trains would transport freight to Pasaport pier, to reduce the congestion in the port of Alsancak. With the opening of this tram line traffic increased even more and the existing freight depots were moved to the Alsancak docks.

The railway also changed the economy of İzmir completely. In the early 1900s, gas lamps were added to the city streets to replace the ones that operated with coal. With this, a power plant was added next to the station and tracks were extended through the station to the docks. The Ottoman Empire sided with Austria-Hungary and the German Empire. During the war the Ottoman Railway Company was taken from the English and operated by the Ottoman government. The Ottoman Empire eventually lost the war in 1920 and the Allies started to occupy Anatolia. The railway still operated but traffic decreased greatly. The station was miraculously unharmed during the Great Fire of Smyrna in 1922. Control of the line was handed back to the ORC on 6 November 1922, when the Ottoman Empire officially collapsed.

The Allied forces eventually left Anatolia after the Turkish Independence War and the Turkish Republic formed. The Ottoman Railway Company continued to operate under its concession by the Ottoman Empire. Traffic increased steadily and a new locomotive shed was built in 1923. In 1927 a railway museum opened in the station. Once the concession ended in 1935, the Turkish State Railways (1927) agreed to buy the ORC for £1,825,840. On 1 June 1935 the State Railways absorbed the ORC.

=== Turkish State Railways era (1935–present) ===
Traffic greatly increased in 1938, when the State Railways started daily service to Ankara. With this increase, a train shed was built over the platforms and the present day station was built. In the early 1950s, the tracks leading to the port were taken up and a new spur was built near Halkapınar. Alsancak became a "gateway to the south" in the 1970s, as trains departing from Alsancak all headed to destinations south of İzmir. Between 2000 and 2001 the State Railways built several more platforms and electrified the tracks, with plans to improve commuter rail in İzmir, however plans fell through and the new tracks served as storage tracks for old railway stock and the overhead wires were never used. On 23 July 2006 the station was closed to passenger service for the renovation of the surrounding lines. Between late 2006 and early 2010, Alsancak station was at an all-time low. No trains served the station until the construction of Karşıyaka tunnel was completed. On 25 May 2010 long-distance passenger service returned.

== Layout ==
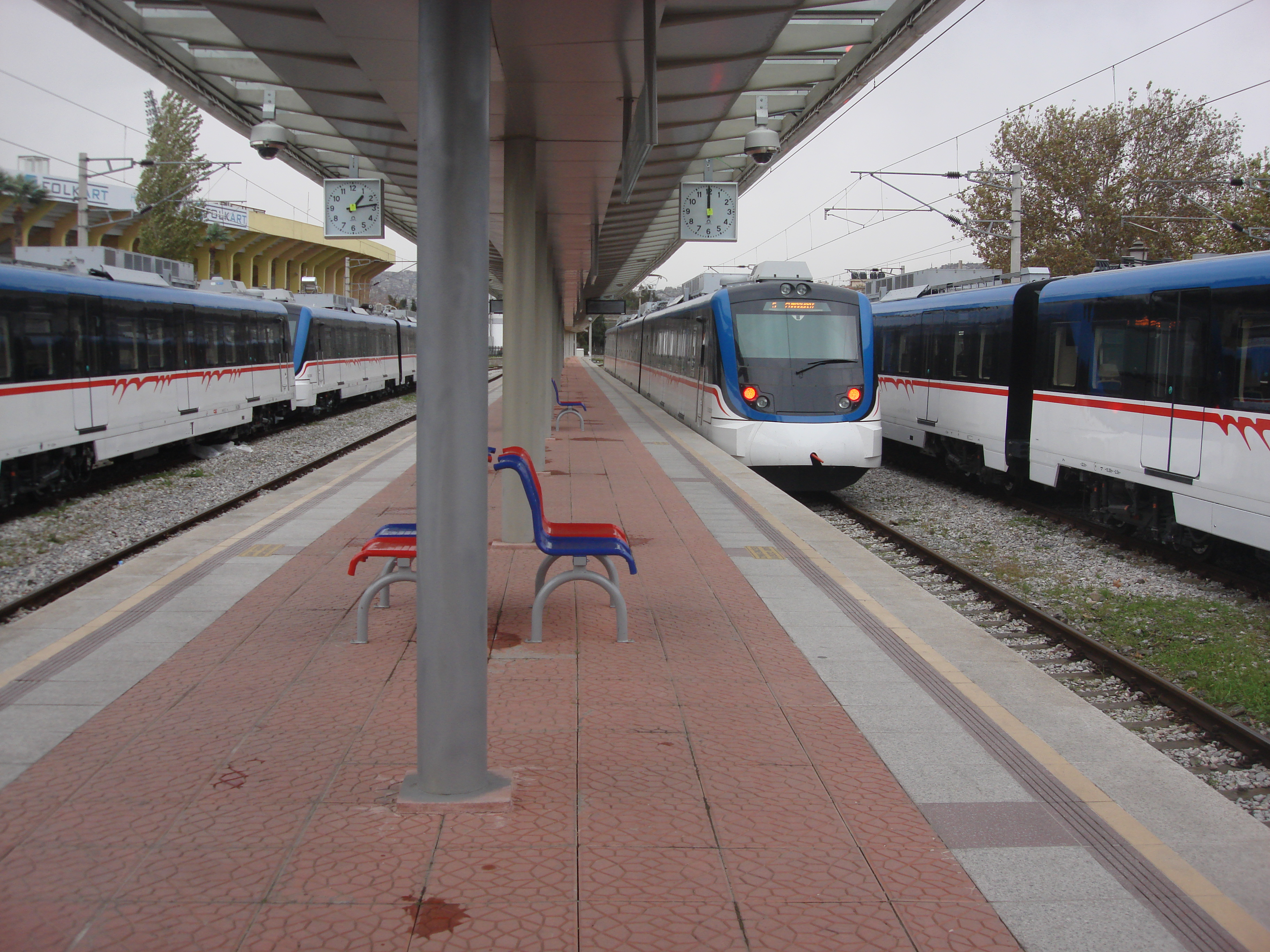
An İZBAN commuter train heading to the Cumaovası district of İzmir

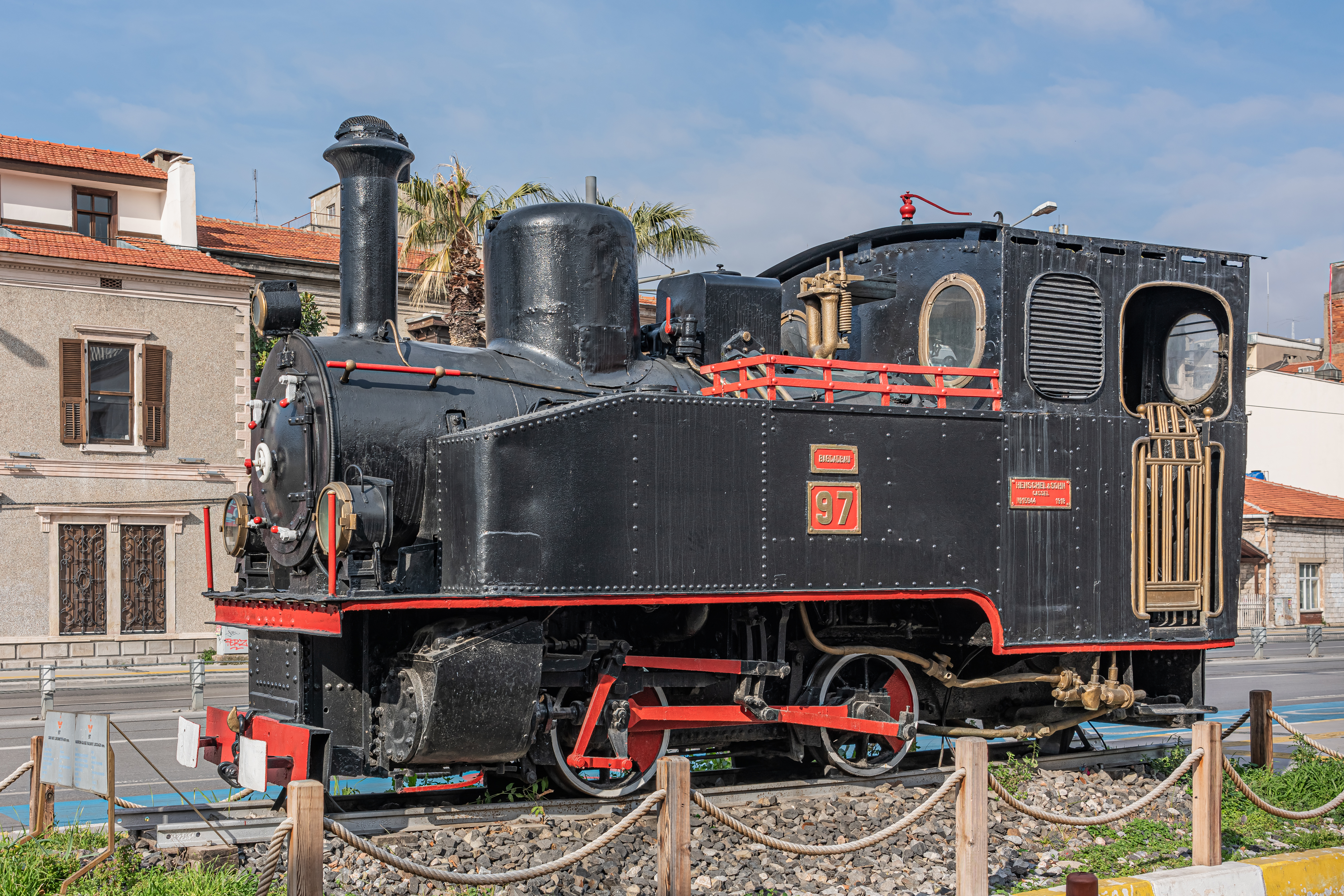
A preserved Henschel & Son steam locomotive from 1918, now exhibited as a monument in front of the Alsancak station building

Alsancak station has a unique layout, compared to other stations in Turkey. Tracks 1, 2, 3, 4, 5, 6 and 10 are currently used as a siding for trains. Alsancak has a main staffed station building, built in 1938, with a ticket and information booth. The 1871 clock tower station is now the headquarters for District 3. The depots behind the clock tower station are used for storing switchers and railcars. The headquarters of İZBAN are in a new building, built in 2002, next to the commuter rail platforms.

== Connections ==
ESHOT operates regional bus service, accessible from the station.

ESHOT Bus service
Route number	Stop	Route	Location
121	Alsancak Gar	Mavişehir Aktarma Merkezi — Konak	Atatürk Street, Liman Street
253	Alsancak Gar	Halkapınar Metro 2 — Konak	Atatürk Street, Liman Street
912	Alsancak Gar	Egekent Aktarma Merkezi — Alsancak Gar	Liman Street
920 (night bus)	Alsancak Gar	Çiğli — Konak	Atatürk Street
930 (night bus)	Alsancak Gar	Bornova — Konak	Atatürk Street
963	Alsancak Gar	Evka 3 Metro — Alsancak Gar	Liman Street

== Media ==
Alsancak has always been a landmark of İzmir. Many films and television shows were filmed in the station. During the 4 years that it was closed to passenger service, Nil Karaibrahimgil and Sıla performed on the platforms.

== See also ==
- İzmir Basmane Terminal
- Ottoman Railway Company
- Turkish State Railways
