= İzmir–Eğirdir railway =

Railway line in Turkey

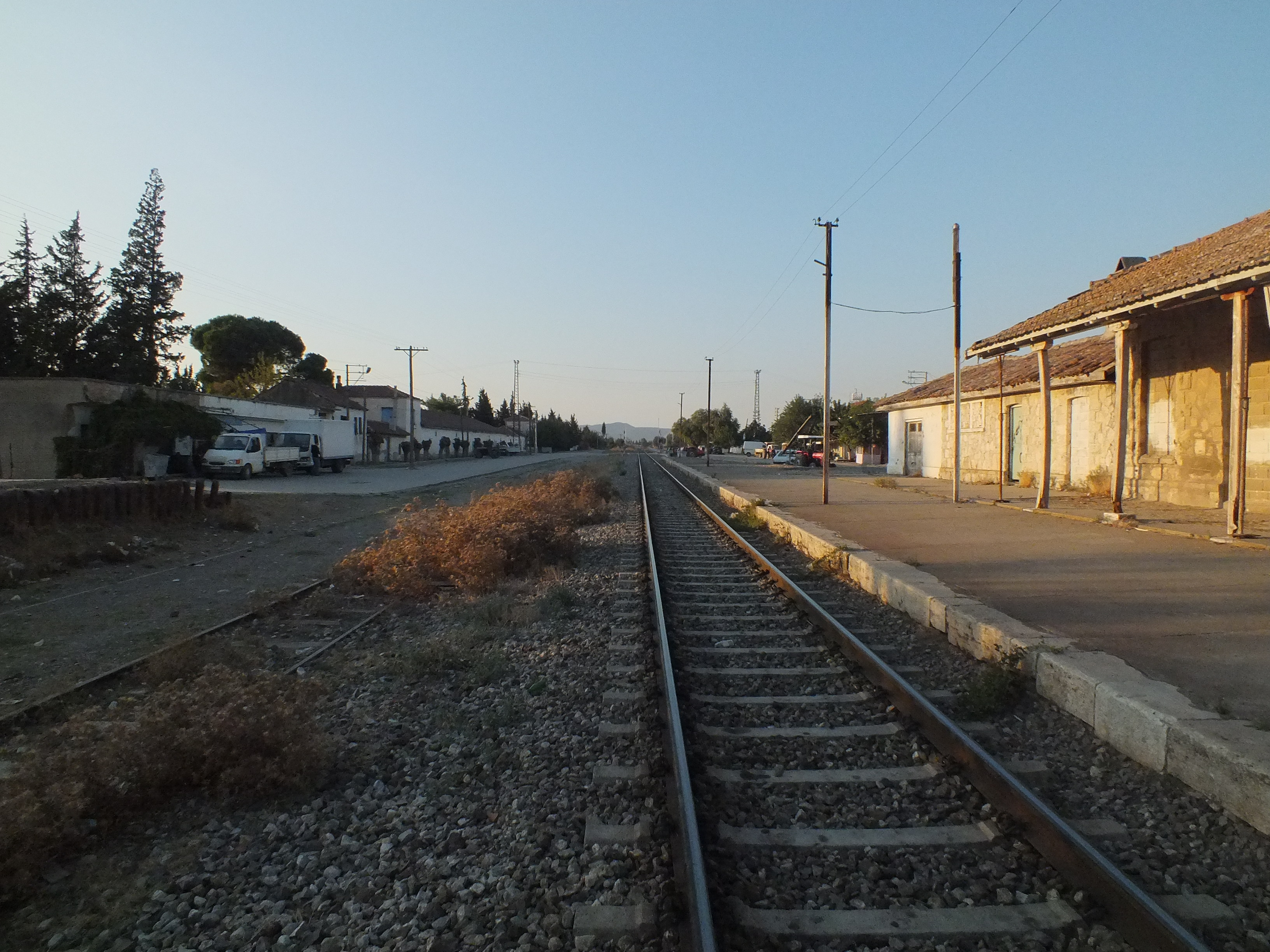
- Looking north at Develiköy.

Overview
- Status: Operational
- Owner: Turkish State Railways
- Locale: Western Anatolia
- Termini: Alsancak; Bozanönü Eğirdir (formerly)
- Stations: 32 (Operational); 47 (Total)

Service
- Type: Heavy rail
- System: Turkish State Railways
- Operator(s): TCDD Taşımacılık

History
- Opened: December 1860 (first section); 1 November 1912 (final section)

Technical
- Line length: 463 km (287.69 mi)
- Number of tracks: 3 (Alsancak-Hilal); 2 (Hilal-Selçuk); 1 (Selçuk–Eğirdir)
- Track gauge: 1,435 mm (4 ft 8 1/2 in) standard gauge
- Electrification: 25 kV (Alsancak–Selçuk)
- Operating speed: 140 km/h (87 mph) (Cumaovası-Selçuk); 100 km/h (62 mph) (the rest)

The İzmir–Eğirdir railway, commonly referred to as the İzmir–Aydın railway, is a main line in southwest Turkey. The railway was the former mainline of the Ottoman Railway Company (ORC) and the İzmir-Aydın section of the line was the first railway in Turkey. The line runs from Alsancak Terminal in İzmir to Bozanönü, where the Isparta branch begins. The short section east of Bozanönü to Eğirdir was abandoned in 2003. TCDD offers passenger service from İzmir to Denizli.

== History ==
On 22 September 1856, the Ottoman Empire granted a concession to the Ottoman Railway Company (ORC), a British company, to build a railway from İzmir to Aydın. The ORC opened the first section of the line, between Alsancak and Gaziemir and Seyiköy in 1858, thus becoming the first railway in Turkey. Construction slowed during the following years due to financial problems, but the line was ultimately completed by 1866. With a large ceremony the line was opened as the inaugural train ran from İzmir to Aydın on 1 July 1866. The ORC was granted another concession to extend the railway to Denizli in 1881. The railway started construction again and the railway reached Kuyucak the same year and Sarayköy in 1882. After a delay in the works, the railway finally reached Denizli as well as Dinar in 1889. The ORC had plans to extend the railway to Konya in the central Anatolian plains, where it could would rival the German-controlled Baghdad Railway. The ORC extended the railway further east and reached Eğirdir in 1912. However, due to poor planning and the outbreak of World War I halted all construction. The railway was taken over by the Ottoman government and used for troop transport. After the war, the ORC regained control of the railway and continued to operate it until 1935, when the Turkish State Railways absorbed the ORC. New branches were built of the railway to reach important towns such as Isparta and Burdur and service increased over the years.

The line was double-tracked in the 1970s between Alsancak and Gaziemir for commuter service. In 2001 the line was electrified from Alsancak to Cumaovası and in 2006 the same portion was upgraded for new commuter service, İZBAN. Between 2006 and 2011, the whole railway was upgraded with new track and rolling stock as part of the railways' nationwide upgrade of their system.
