= IZBAN E22000 =

Electric commuter train

TCDD E22000
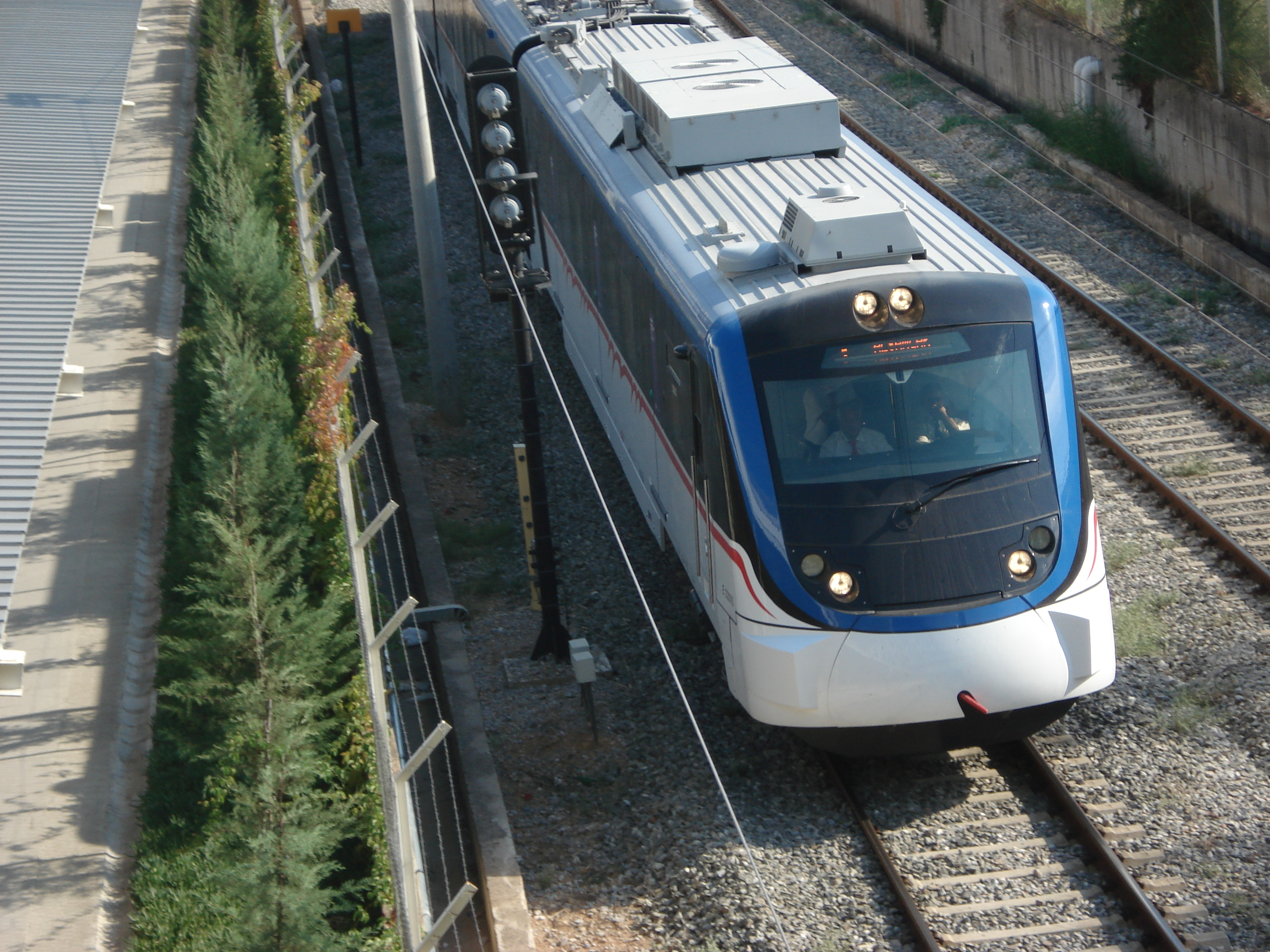
- E22008 at Adnan Menderes Airport railway station.
- In service: 2010-present
- Manufacturer: CAF
- Constructed: 2010-2011
- Entered service: 2010
- Number built: 33
- Number in service: 33
- Formation: 3 cars
- Fleet numbers: 22001-22033
- Capacity: 741
- Operators: TCDD Transport; İZBAN A.Ş.
- Depots: Çiğli depot (İzmir), Cumaovası yard, Aliağa station siding, Menemen station siding
- Lines served: İZBAN

Specifications
- Car length: 23.3 m (76 ft 5 5/16 in) (head cars); 22.6 m (74 ft 1 3/4 in) (mid cars)
- Floor height: 1,100 mm (43 5/16 in)
- Platform height: 1,080 mm (42 1/2 in)
- Entry: level entry
- Maximum speed: 140 km/h (87 mph) (approved); 180 km/h (112 mph)(non-revenue tested value)
- Transmission: AC-AC
- Acceleration: 1.1 m/s^{2} (2.5 mph/s)
- Deceleration: 1.4 m/s^{2} (3.1 mph/s)
- Power supply: Pantograph
- Electric system(s): 25 kV, 50 Hz AC
- Track gauge: 1,435 mm / 4 ft 8 1/2 in standard gauge

The E22000 is an electric multiple unit built by CAF for use on the İZBAN commuter rail system. 33 sets of 3 train cars were built between 2010–11 and have been operating along the İZBAN line in İzmir since 2010. The 22000 series EMUs are powered by 25 kV AC via overhead catenary. Each 3 car set cost €3.7 million each.
