= İZBAN =

Suburban rail system in Izmir, Turkey

İzmir Banliyö Sistemi

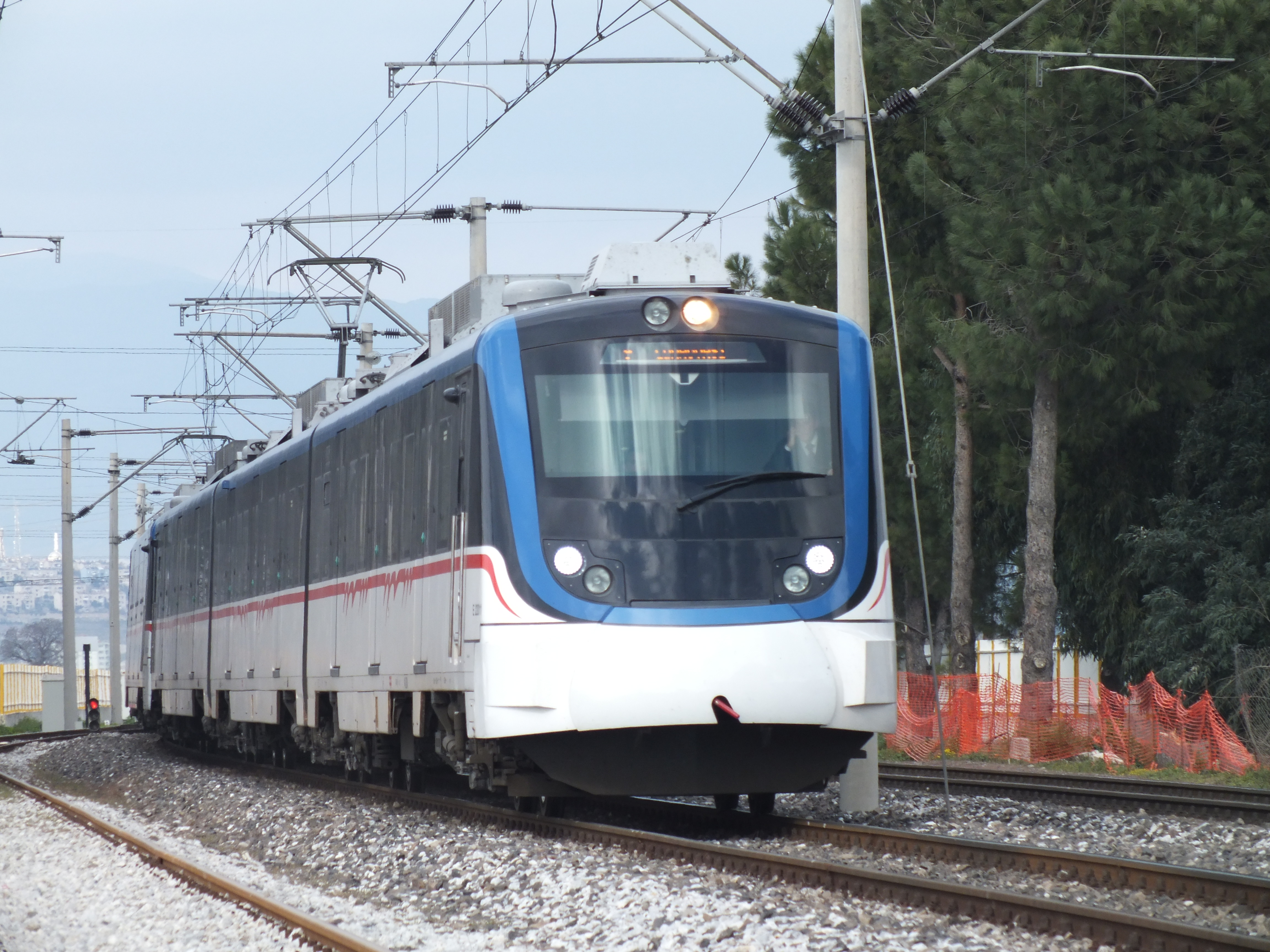
- An İZBAN train at Ulukent station.

Overview
- Stations operated: 41
- Headquarters: Ataşehir, Çiğli
- Reporting mark: İZBAN
- Locale: İzmir
- Dates of operation: 2010–
- Predecessor: Çiğli suburban Cumaovası suburban

Technical
- Track gauge: 1,435 mm (4 ft 8 1/2 in)
- Electrification: 25 kV AC overhead
- Length: 136 km (85 mi)
- Operating speed: 140 km/h

Other
- Website: İZBAN Official Site

İzmir Banliyö Anonim Şirketi
- Type: Government partnership organised as a joint-stock company
- Industry: Rail transport
- Founded: July 25, 2006
- Headquarters: Alsancak, İzmir, Turkey
- Area served: İzmir
- Key people: Seçkin Mutlu (CEO)
- Services: Commuter railway service in İzmir
- Owner: TCDD (50%); İzmir Municipality (50%)
- Website: Official website

İZBAN, previously known as Egeray, is a commuter rail system serving İzmir and its metropolitan area. Averaging a daily ridership of 185,000 passengers, it is the busiest commuter rail system in Turkey, slightly ahead of the Marmaray commuter line in Istanbul. İZBAN is a portmanteau of the words "İzmir" and "Banliyö" (suburb in Turkish).

Established in 2007 and began operations in 2010, İZBAN was formed to revive old commuter rail in İzmir. As of 2024, İZBAN operates a 136 km (85 mi) long system, with 41 stations.

İZBAN A.Ş., founded in 2006, operates the railway and is owned 50% by the Turkish State Railways and 50% by the İzmir Metropolitan Municipality. İZBAN is a part of the municipality's transportation master plan.

== Routes ==
İZBAN currently has four routes; The Aliağa-Cumaovası, serving the central districts of the city and into Aliağa, The Menemen-Tepeköy, serving the central districts of the city, of Menderes and the southern town of Torbalı. Another line is the Tepeköy-Selçuk which connects the town of Torbalı with the town of Selçuk. The Çiğli-Halkapınar line only runs during rush hours on weekends in order to reduce pressure on The Aliağa-Cumaovası and The Menemen-Tepeköy lines. Apart from The Tepeköy-Selçuk line, all lines run through the central districts providing 5-8 trains per hour in the central district.

Route	Distance	Trains Per Hour	Districts served
Aliağa-Cumaovası	78 km (48 mi)	3	Aliağa, Menemen, Çiğli, Karşıyaka, Bayraklı, Konak, Buca, Gaziemir, Menderes
Menemen-Tepeköy	84 km (52 mi)	3	Menemen, Çiğli, Karşıyaka, Bayraklı, Konak, Buca, Gaziemir, Menderes, Torbalı
Tepeköy-Selçuk	26 km (16 mi)	1	Torbalı, Selçuk
Çiğli-Halkapınar	26 km (16 mi)	Weekday rush only.	Çiğli, Karşıyaka, Bayraklı

== History ==
İZBAN A.Ş. was jointly created on 10 January 2007 by the İzmir Municipality and the Turkish State Railways to operate commuter service within the city. Previously commuter service was operated by the State Railways but service wasn't very frequent and trains weren't as efficient. By 2006 commuter ridership within İzmir was at its all time lowest with only 98,000 boardings that year. This followed a steady decrease in ridership since the 1990s. In order to revive commuter service in the city, the State Railways executed a complete overhaul of their two lines within the city. On 23 July 2006, the State Railways temporarily suspended all rail service into İzmir. Regional and intercity trains would terminate at Çiğli in the north and Gaziemir in the south.

During this time, the 24 existing commuter stations were rebuilt and 5 new stations were added. New bus transfer terminals were added to integrate commuter service with the citywide bus service ESHOT. All grade crossings were converted to overpasses or underpasses with the exception of 7 crossings that were operational when service began. Today, only 3 remain and will be removed in the near future. Two railway tunnels were built in Karşıyaka and Şirinyer with a total of 4 underground stations and the railway's former right of way were converted into parks. Tracks were relaid with cement ties and signalization was upgraded to a central control station at Alsancak. Turnstiles were added at stations to integrate them with the citywide smartcard, İzmirimKart. A new maintenance facility was opened in Çiğli as well as a small yard was opened in Cumaovası for the trains.

== Service ==
Map of all rail transit lines in İzmir, İZBAN shown in dark blue

All of the tracks are owned by the Turkish State Railways. There is a transfer from Halkapınar and Hilal stations to the M1 Metro Line ; from Çiğli, Alaybey, Halkapınar and Alsancak stations to the Tram İzmir network ; and from Aliağa, Biçerova, Hatundere, Menemen, Ulukent, Egekent, Çiğli, Mavişehir, Turan, Bayraklı, Salhane, Halkapınar, Alsancak, Kemer, Şirinyer, Koşu, İnkılap, Semt Garajı, Esbaş, Gaziemir, Sarnıç, Adnan Menderes Havalimanı, Cumaovası, Tekeli, Pancar, Kuşçuburun, Torbalı, Tepeköy, Sağlık and Belevi stations to ESHOT buses. It is possible to transfer to mainline trains and regional trains operated by TCDD Taşımacılık from Selçuk, Sağlık, Tepeköy, Torbalı, Pancar, Cumaovası, Adnan Menderes Havalimanı, Gaziemir, Çiğli and Menemen stations.

Passengers need to have İzmirim Kart to use İZBAN which allows for transfer between all inner-city transport options. Starting in 2018, passengers need to pay for the amount of kilometres they travelled. This was done due to the length of the line being much longer compared to other public transport options in İzmir.

=== Ridership ===
İZBAN is one of the busiest commuter railroads in Turkey, reaching 1,000,000,000 total passengers carried in 2024. İZBAN carried 88,650,000 passengers in 2023 making the average daily ridership is about 250,000. This is more than twice the size of the average daily ridership in 2013 which was about 100,000.

== Rolling stock ==
Model	Picture	Numbers	Built	Type	Power	Builder (Designer)
E22000		22001–22033	2010–2011	EMU	25 kV 50 Hz AC	CAF
E22100		22101–22140	2012–2015	EMU	25 kV 50 Hz AC	Hyundai Rotem

== Future developments ==
In 2022, the Izmir Metropolitan Municipality announced that work on two infill stations would begin in 2023. The stations will be called Gürçeşme (originally Lale Mahallesi), located between Şirinyer and Kemer, and Katip Çelebi University, located between Egekent and Ulukent.

=== Aliağa-Bergama ===
İZBAN plans to extend the line 55 km north from Aliağa to Bergama. The goal of this project is to link the ancient cities of Pergamon and Ephesus with İzmir by rail.

== Suspended ==
=== Menemen-Manisa ===
An extension to Manisa was planned and construction was expected to begin towards the end of 2011. This would mean the upgrading of several stations (Emiralem, Ayvacık, Muradiye, Horozköy) and a major upgrade of the Manisa Railway Station, as well as adding a few new stations to serve all villages near the line (Yahşelli, Göktepe). Together with this, the existing single track line, would be made double track and electrified with 25 kV AC overhead wire.

== Gallery ==
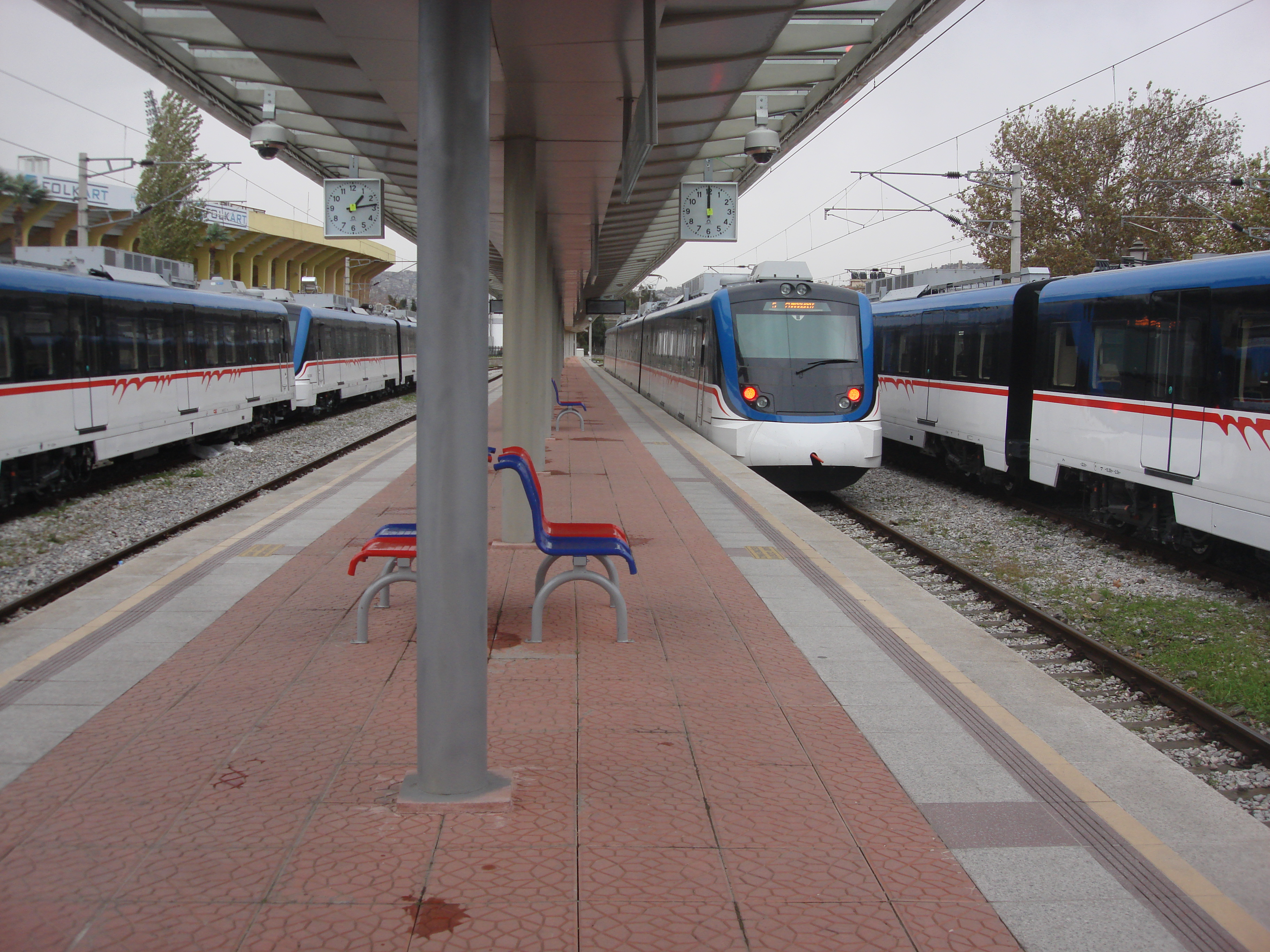
IZBAN trains at Alsancak railway station in 2010.

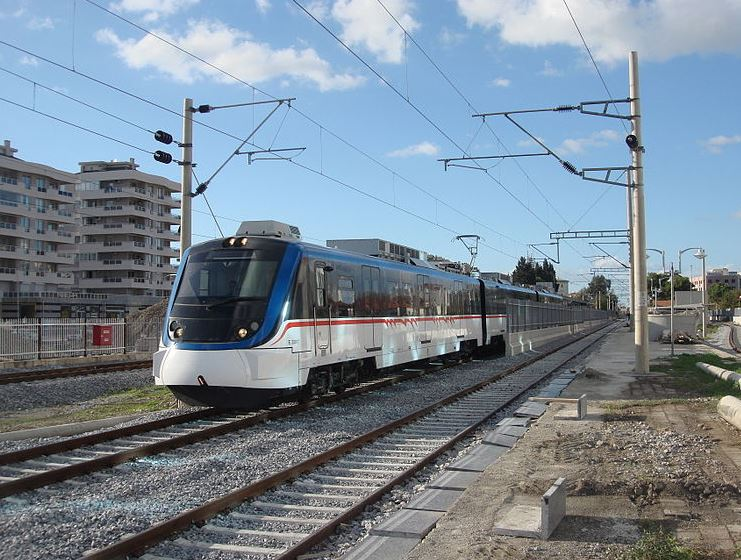
An İZBAN train departing Çiğli railway station.

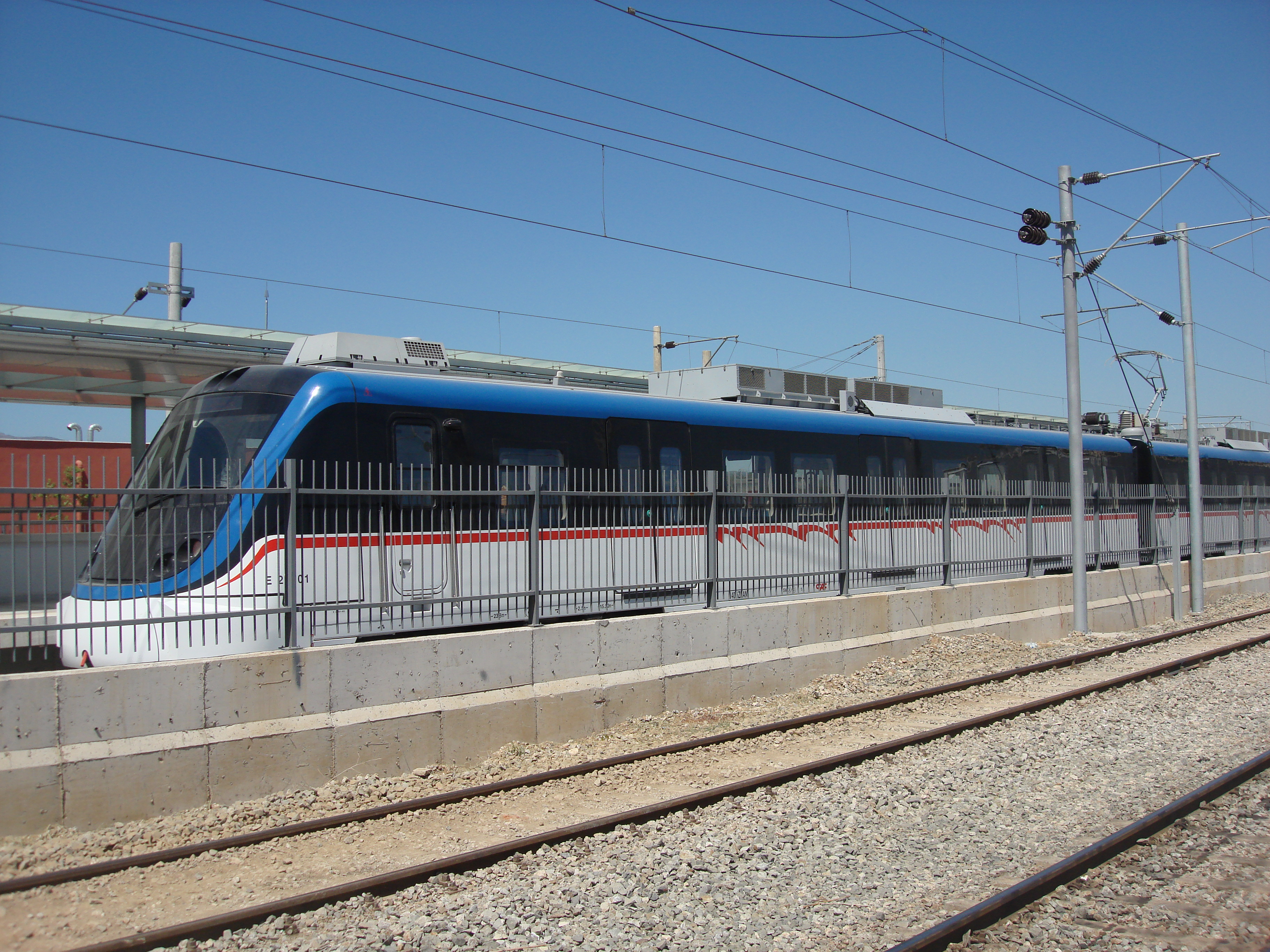
A train waiting to head back to Alsancak railway station during a test run before its opening.

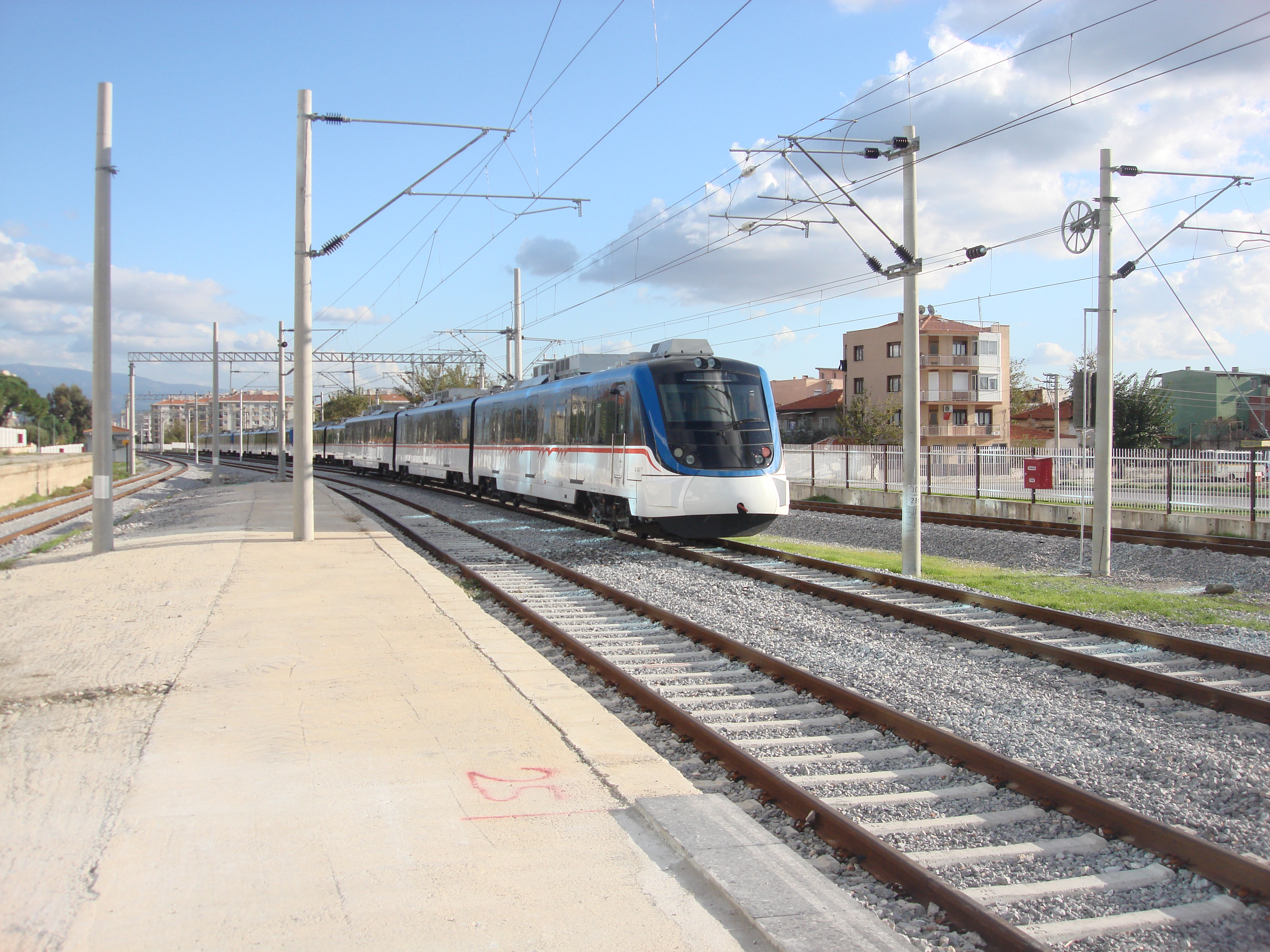
An İZBAN train leaving the Çiğli railway station.

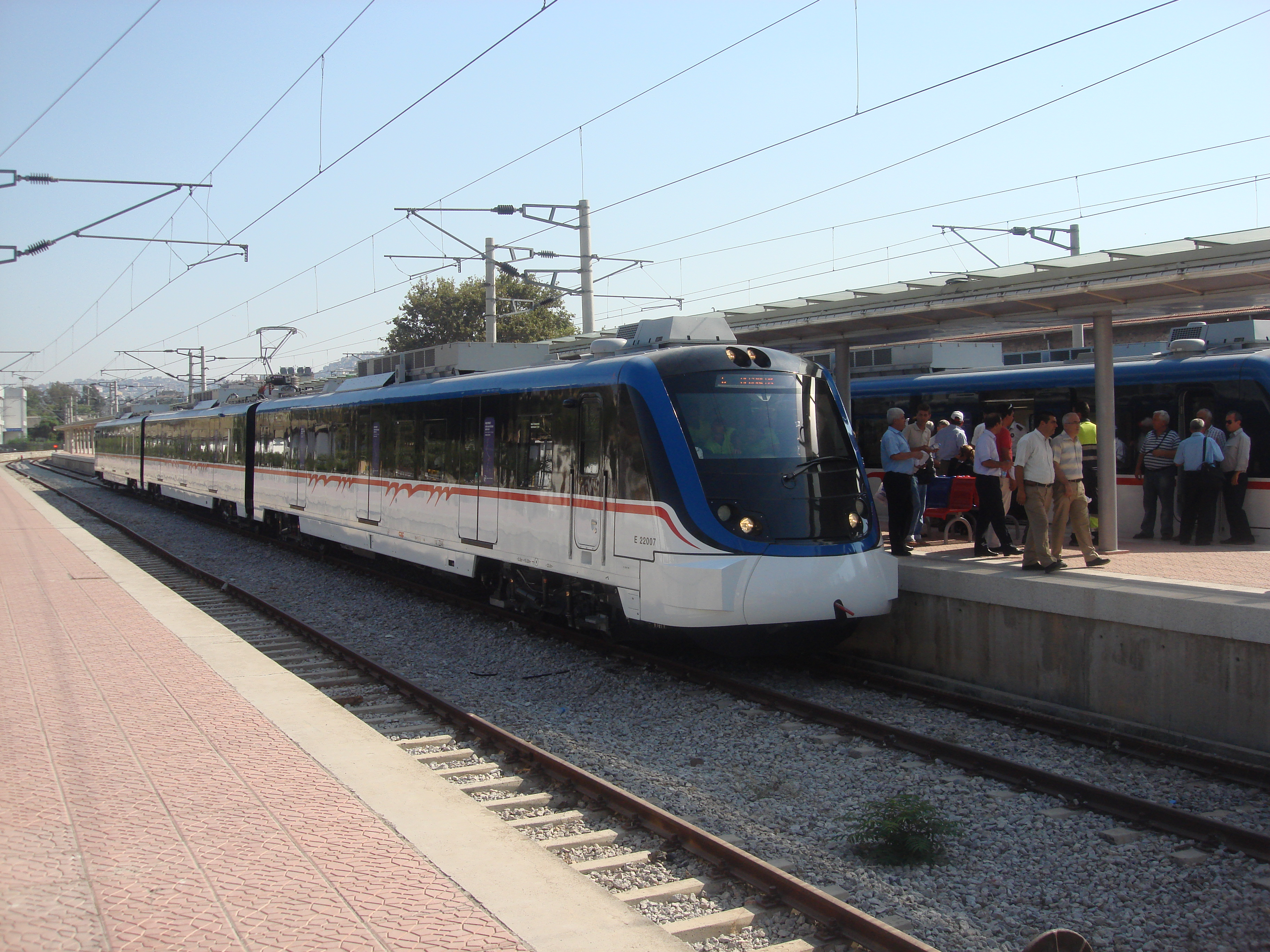
A train arriving at Alsancak railway station on opening day.

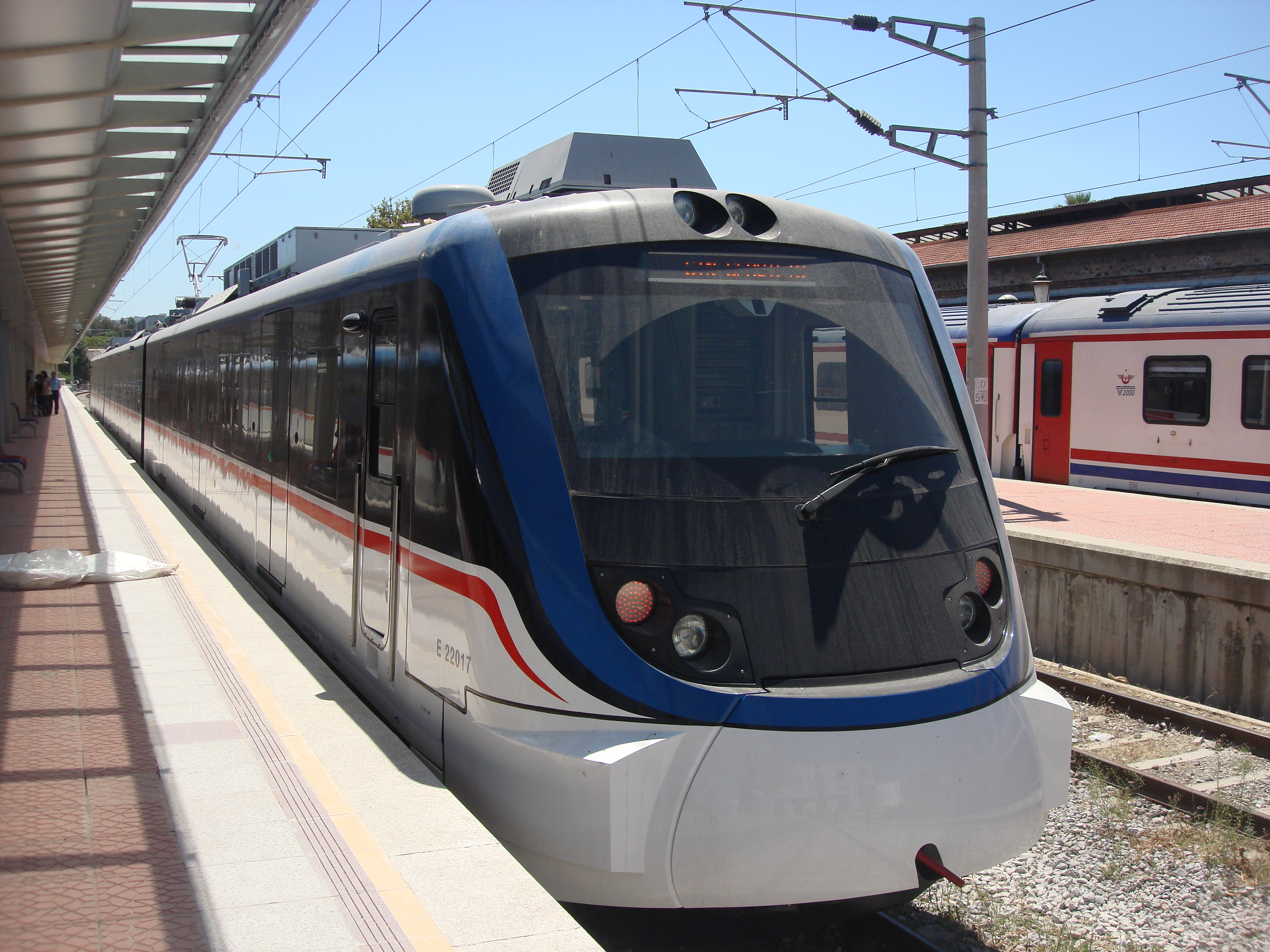
E22017 at Alsancak railway station.

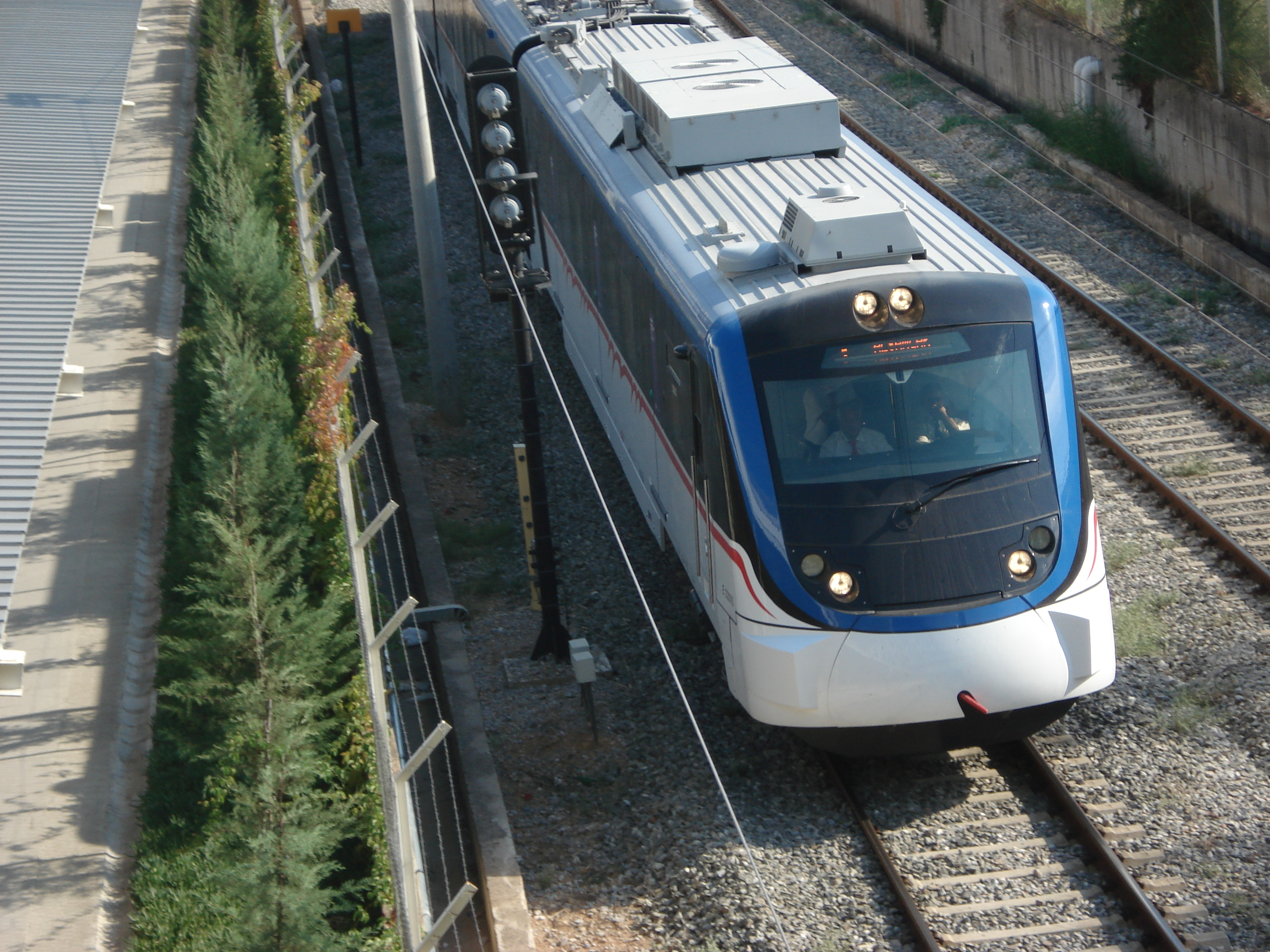
E22008 at Adnan Menderes Airport railway station.

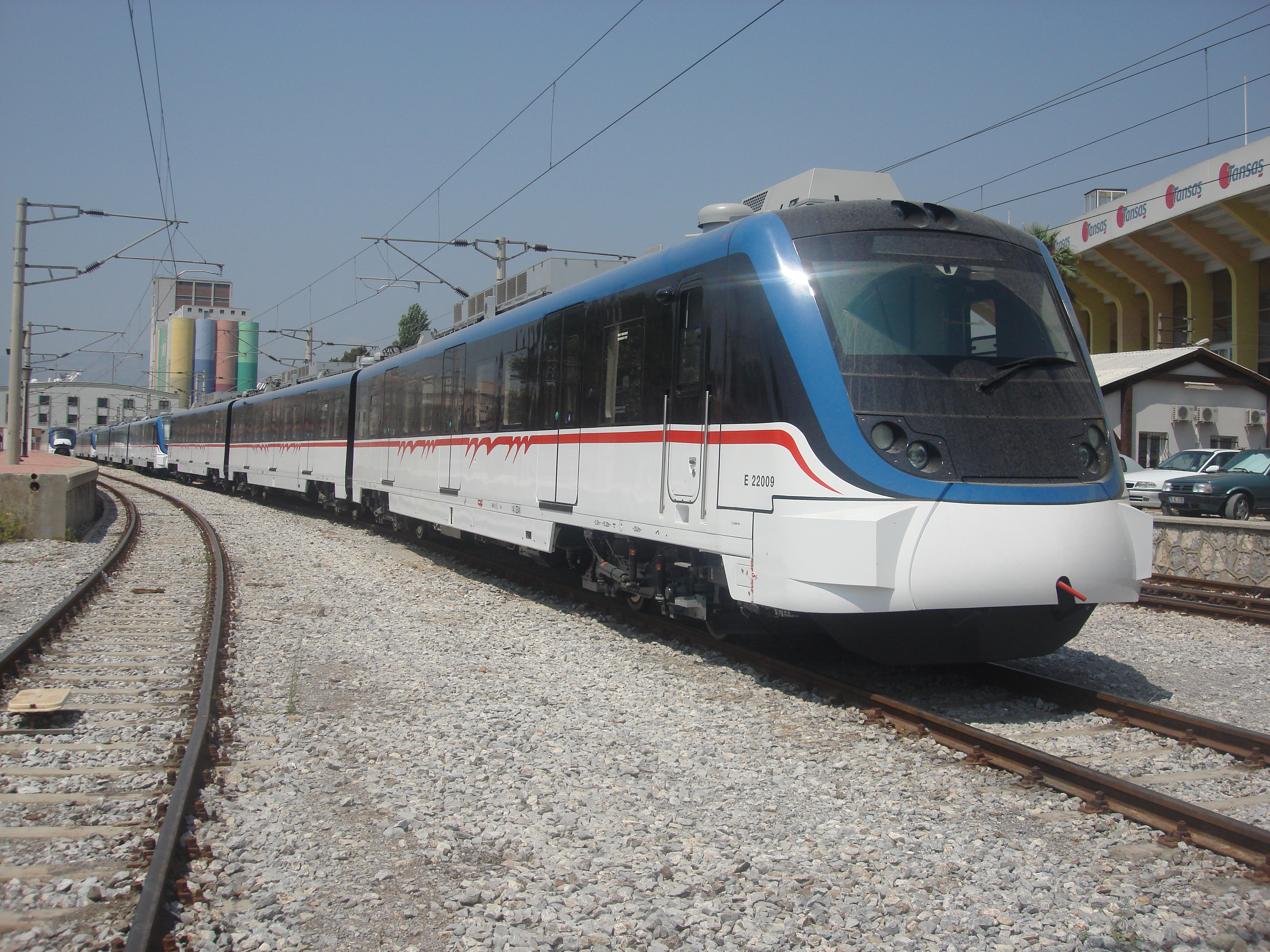
İZBAN at Alsancak railway station.

== See also ==
- İzmir Metro
- Rail transport in İzmir
- Tram Izmir
