= Aliağa railway station =

Railway station in Aliağa, İzmir, Turkey

Aliağa
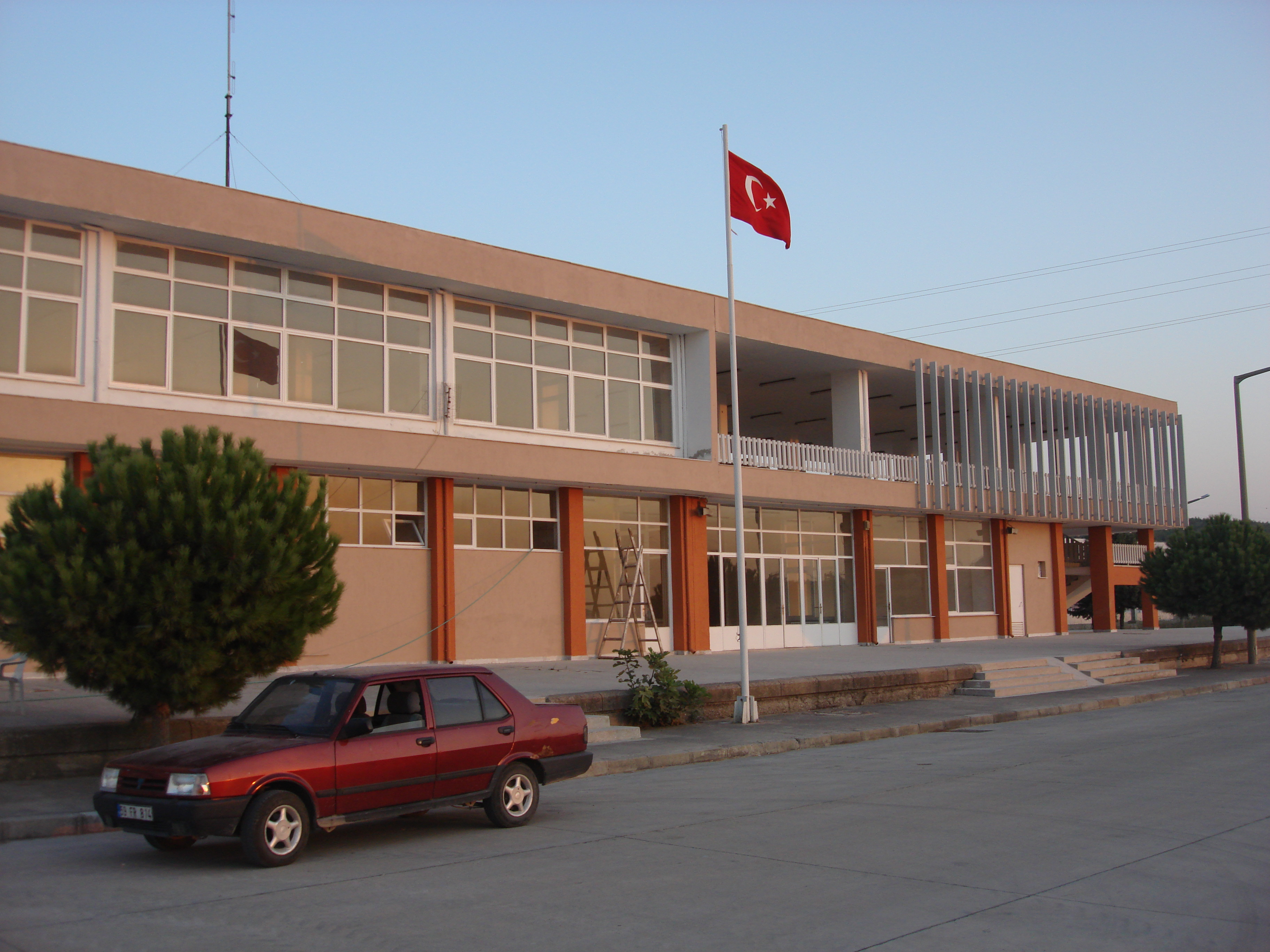
- The station building.

General information
- Location: İstasyon Cd., Yeni Mah., 35800; Aliağa, İzmir; Turkey
- Coordinates: 38.7892°N 26.9672°E
- System: İZBAN commuter rail station
- Owner: Turkish State Railways
- Operator: İZBAN A.Ş.
- Line: Menemen-Aliağa railway
- Platforms: 2 (1 side platform, 1 island platform)
- Tracks: 3

Construction
- Structure type: At-grade
- Parking: Yes
- Cycle facilities: No
- Accessible: Yes

History
- Opened: 1995
- Closed: 2006-10
- Electrified: 2004 (25 kV AC)

Services
Preceding station	İZBAN	Following station
Biçerova towards Cumaovası	Aliağa-Cumaovası	Terminus
Biçerova towards Tepeköy	Aliağa-Tepeköy (Late nights)	Terminus
Location

Aliağa railway station (Turkish: Aliağa istasyonu) is a railway station in Aliağa, Turkey and is the northern terminus of the İZBAN commuter rail system. Located within the south part of the city, the station is adjacent to the D.550 highway.

== History ==
Construction of a railway from Menemen to Aliağa began in the early 1990s by the Turkish State Railways. This double-track railway was opened in 1995, with Aliağa at its northern end. The station opened with two platforms, servicing three tracks along with five tracks as a small yard. While the main focus of this line, originally, was to connect the port and heavy industries around the city to the national rail network, the need of frequent passenger rail service from İzmir was also acknowledged. Once the railway was completed, in 1995, regional rail service from Çiğli station in İzmir began. Passengers could then transfer at Çiğli to local train service to Alsancak, in Konak. In 1999, the İzmir Metropolitan Municipality and the Turkish State Railways plans to integrate Aliağa station into the larger Aliağa-Menderes railway corridor were put into motion. This began with the electrification of the station, which was completed in 2004. Despite the completion of the infrastructure, no electric trains were put into service, as the project was revised and delayed.

With the revision of the commuter rail project, a new tunnel was to be built in Karşıyaka, leading to the temporary closure of the railway within the city in 2006. This also led to the temporary cancellation of all passenger train service to Aliağa. While efforts were made to restore service to Aliağa from either Menemen or Çiğli, these efforts failed to do so. With the cancellation of passenger train service, the station and its small yard were used to store freight trains as auxiliary storage to the yard at Biçerova. In anticipation for new İZBAN commuter rail service, a parking lot and bus station was added, along with turnstiles, an information desk and PIS boards.

On 29 October 2010, İZBAN began testing its trains to Aliağa, with its new E22000 EMUs. Finally, on 30 January 2011, regular passenger train service was inaugurated from Çiğli to Aliağa. Trains ran to and from Aliağa on an hourly basis. Due to high demand, İZBAN increased its service frequency to Aliağa on 15 May 2011, to half-hourly. In 2011, plans to extend the railway from Aliağa to Bergama were also put into motion, although as of 2025, construction has not yet begun.

== Layout and Location ==
Aliağa station has one island platform and one side platform, servicing three tracks. However, only the island platform is open to passenger service. Four tracks on the east side of the station are used for storage, primarily for freight and maintenance vehicles and occasionally for as a layover track for İZBAN trains. The station itself is located within the south side of Aliağa, accessible via İstasyon St. from İnönü St.. İnönü St. is accessible from the D.550 state highway, which is adjacent to the station to the east. The station building is located on the west side, along with a parking lot for employees and a bus stop for ESHOT buses.

== Bus connections ==
ESHOT

- 740 Aliağa-Menemen
