= Ottoman Railway Company =

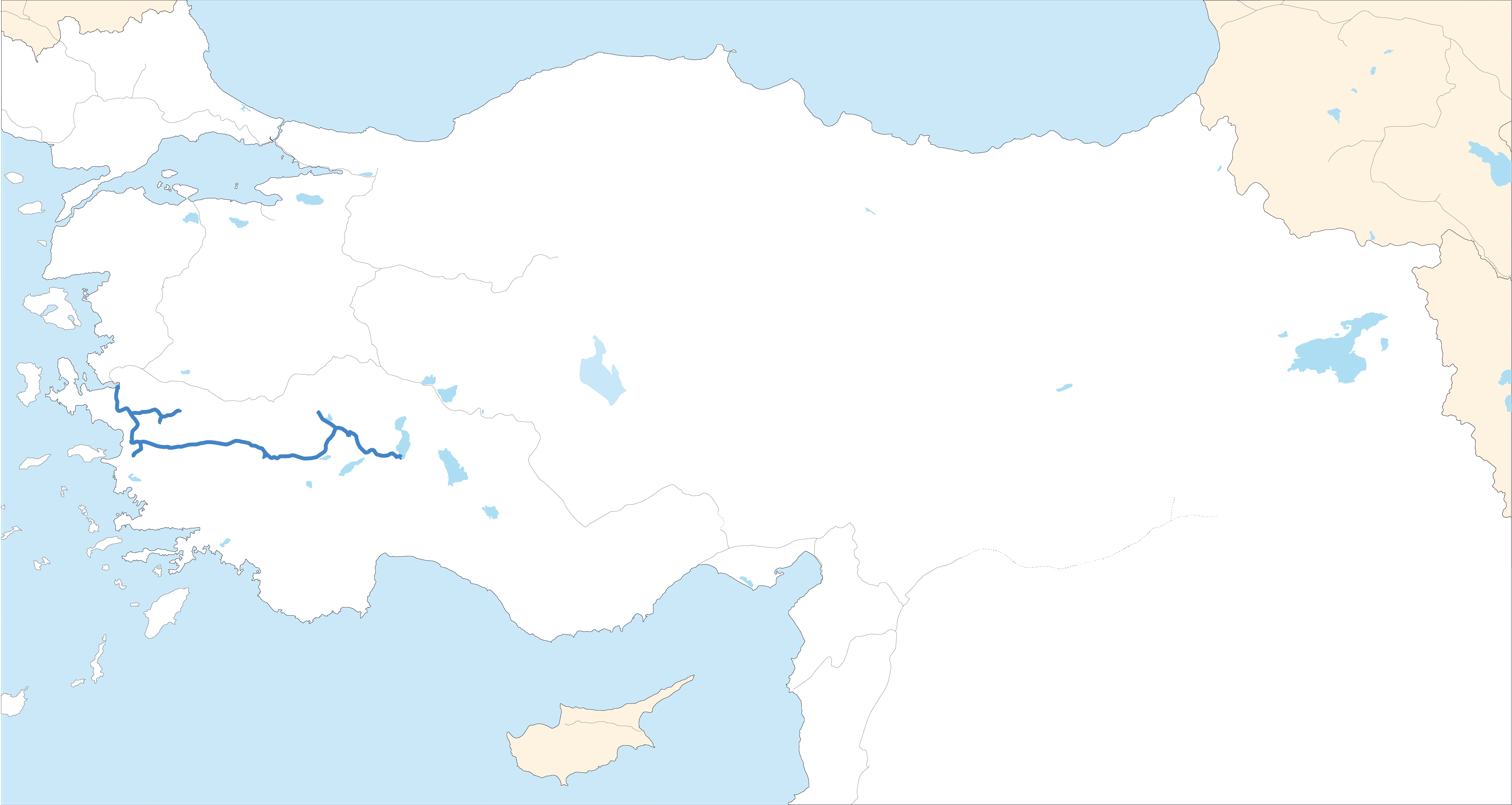
- Map of the ORC system in 1912.

Overview
- Headquarters: İzmir, Turkey
- Reporting mark: ORC
- Locale: Southwestern Anatolia
- Dates of operation: 1856–1935

Technical
- Track gauge: 4 ft 8 1/2 in (1,435 mm) standard gauge
- Length: 609 km (378 mi)

The Ottoman Railway Company, commonly referred to as the İzmir–Aydın Railway (Turkish: İzmir-Aydın Demiryolu), is the oldest railway in Anatolia and second oldest railway in the Ottoman Empire. The railway was built by a British company to transport mineral and fruit (primarily figs) from the Aydın plain to the Port of İzmir to be exported.

The railway also played an important role in operating commuter rail service throughout southern İzmir. By 1912 the railway was operating 3 commuter routes within the city. The main goal of the ORC was to build a line to Aydın, however once the railway got concessions to extend their mainline, they quickly started to dominate the rail industry in İzmir. They extended their mainline to Denizli and then to Eğirdir by 1912 as well as building branch lines to towns in the İzmir province. However their initial goal of reaching Konya in Central Anatolia was never achieved. The ORC continued to operate as a regional railway up until 1935, when the Turkish State Railways absorbed it.

== History ==
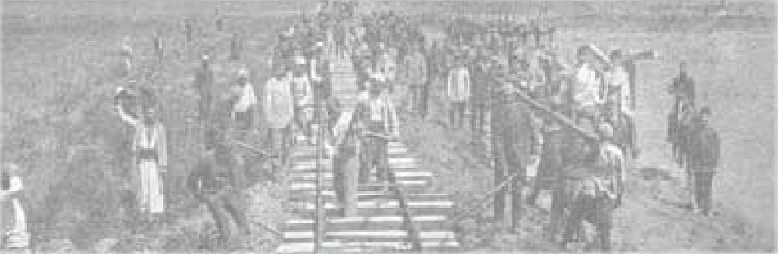
Construction of the railway (1860s)

The ORC concession was given on 22 September 1856 to build and operate the line between İzmir (then known as Smyrna) and Aydın. The concession was to last for 50 years from 1 October 1860, the date originally agreed for the opening of the line. However, construction time and cost were underestimated, the estimated initial capital of £1.2 million proved too small and the opening to Aydın had to be delayed until 1866.

The first section, from İzmir to Seydiköy, was opened on 30 October 1858. This was the first railway in Anatolia and in present-day Turkey, and the second railway in the Ottoman Empire and the Middle East after the Alexandria to Cairo line in the Ottoman eyalet of Egypt (opened in 1856).

The ORC obtained additional concessions step by step and managed to extend the line as far as Eğridir in 1912. The ORC also acquired in 1921 the suburban line from Şirinyer to Buca on the outskirts of İzmir, which operated since 1870. The intent of the company was to carry mineral and agricultural goods from the rich Menderes Valleys to the port of İzmir. However, this traffic was not enough to generate big revenues and the ORC was never highly profitable. One way out would have been to extend the network to the Anatolian Plateau, but the ORC failed to secure the concession to extend to Konya or to Afyon. Indeed railways concession were highly political, the British voters were not keen for their government to help the Ottomans building railways that might compete with other British interest in India and in the Middle East. On the other hand the CFOA which had secured railway concession in Afyon and Konya lobbied the Ottomans against further extension of the ORC. Consequently, the ORC acted very much like a colonial railway: connecting a large port to the hinterland, facilitating export of raw material and agricultural products and imports of manufactured products. Because of poor Ottoman planning, the ORC could play no role at integrating various large city such as Izmir with Konya.

== Depots ==
The ORC had several depots along their main line. Their largest facility was the Alsancak Maintenance Shops. Small freight depots are located next to the tracks in most towns. The ORC had two locomotive maintenance shops located in Alsancak and Denizli. Maintenance shops for railway cars were located in Alsancak, Cumaovası, Tire, Aydın, Nazilli, Denizli and Dinar. When the Alsancak shops were opened they were the largest in the Empire.

== See also ==
- Çamlık Railway Museum is sited on a section of the line through Çamlık, Selçuk, bypassed when the line from İzmir was re-aligned.
