= Polatlı–Menemen high-speed railway =

Turkish high-speed railway under construction

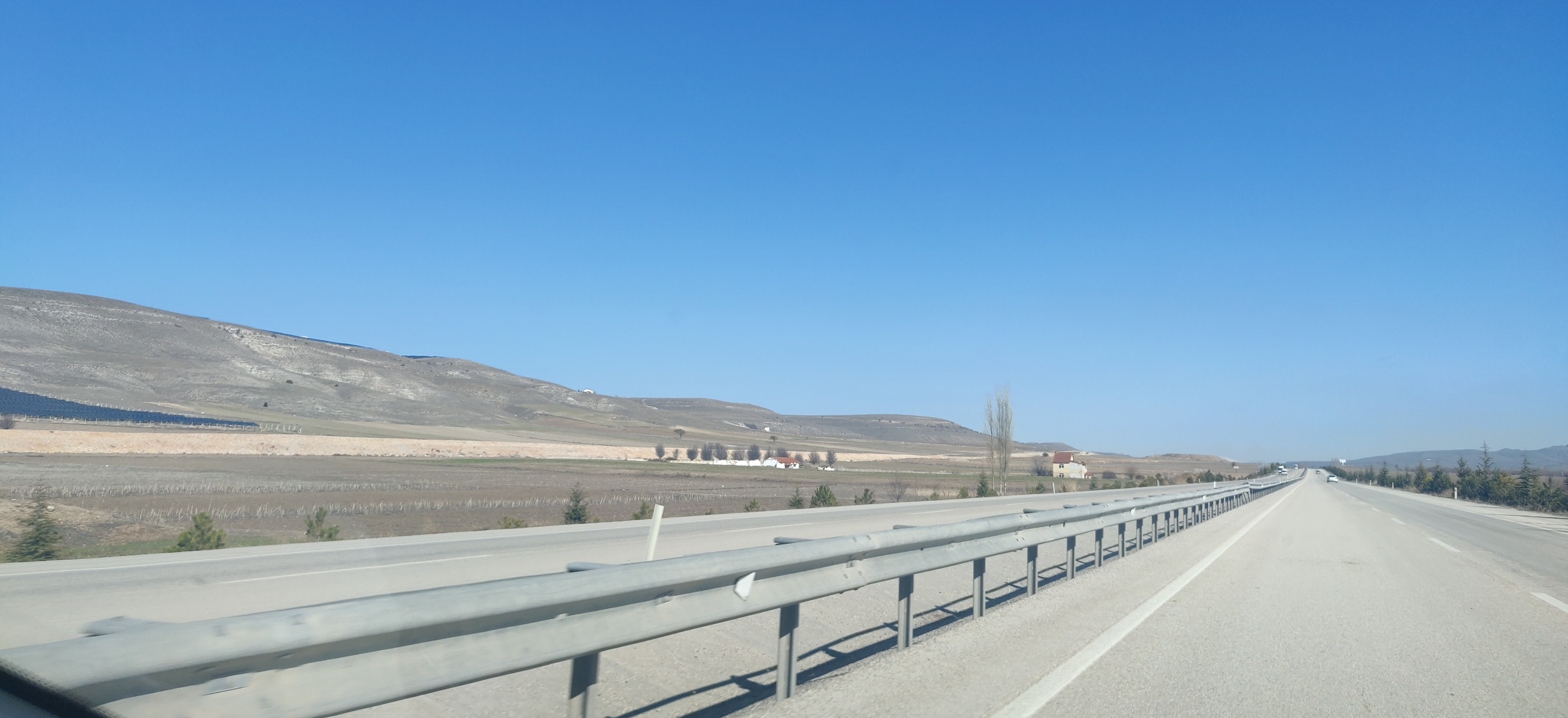
- Construction of the railway near Dumlupınar

Overview
- Status: Under construction
- Owner: Turkish State Railways
- Locale: Central and western Anatolia
- Termini: Polatlı YHT railway station, Ankara Province; Menemen railway station, İzmir Province
- Stations: 11

Service
- Type: High-speed rail
- System: Turkish State Railways
- Services: Alsancak-Ankara; Alsancak-Uşak (mixed high-speed and higher-speed rail stock); Afyon-Ankara; Alsancak-Konya (higher-speed rail stock); Afyon-Konya (higher-speed rail stock)
- Operator(s): TCDD Taşımacılık
- Depot(s): Etimesgut yard Güvercinlik yard
- Rolling stock: HT65000, HT80000

Technical
- Line length: 505 km (313.79 mi)
- Number of tracks: Double track
- Character: High-speed rail
- Track gauge: 1,435 mm (4 ft 8 1/2 in) standard gauge
- Loading gauge: UIC standard (Turgutlu-Yenice); TCDD gross gauge (Turgutlu-Alsancak)
- Minimum radius: 3 500 m (Turgutlu-Yenice); 160 m (Turgutlu-Alsancak)
- Electrification: 25 kV, 50 Hz AC overhead line
- Operating speed: 250 km/h (160 mph)
- Maximum incline: 16 ‰

The Polatlı–Menemen high-speed railway is a 505 km (313.79 mi) long high-speed railway currently under construction in Turkey.

The railway will split from the Polatlı-Konya high-speed railway about 27 km (17 mi) south of Polatlı junction, where the Polatlı-Konya HSR splits from the Istanbul-Ankara HSR, and head west to Afyonkarahisar, then it will parallel the İzmir–Afyon railway to Menemen. Travel times between Ankara-Afyon and Ankara–İzmir are expected to be 1h 30min and 3h 30min, respectively.

Construction of the initial section began in 2012, but was suspended in 2018 when almost 50% of the works had been completed on some sections. The construction was restarted in 2022, and planned to be completed in 2027.

== Sections and speeds ==
Constructions are divided into six sections starting from the split point:

Section	Length	Max Speed	Notes
Polatlı–Afyon	152 km	250 km/h	in progress
Afyon–Banaz	80 km	250 km/h	in progress
Banaz–Eşme	97 km	250 km/h	in progress
Eşme–Salihli	74 km	250 km/h	in progress
Salihli–Manisa	62 km	250 km/h	in progress
Manisa–Menemen	43 km	250 km/h	in progress

== Stations ==
The line will consist of eleven stations: Polatlı, Emirdağ, Afyonkarahisar, Uşak, Alaşehir, Salihli, Manisa, Muradiye, Ayvacık, Emiralem, Menemen.
