= Horozköy railway station =

Horozköy
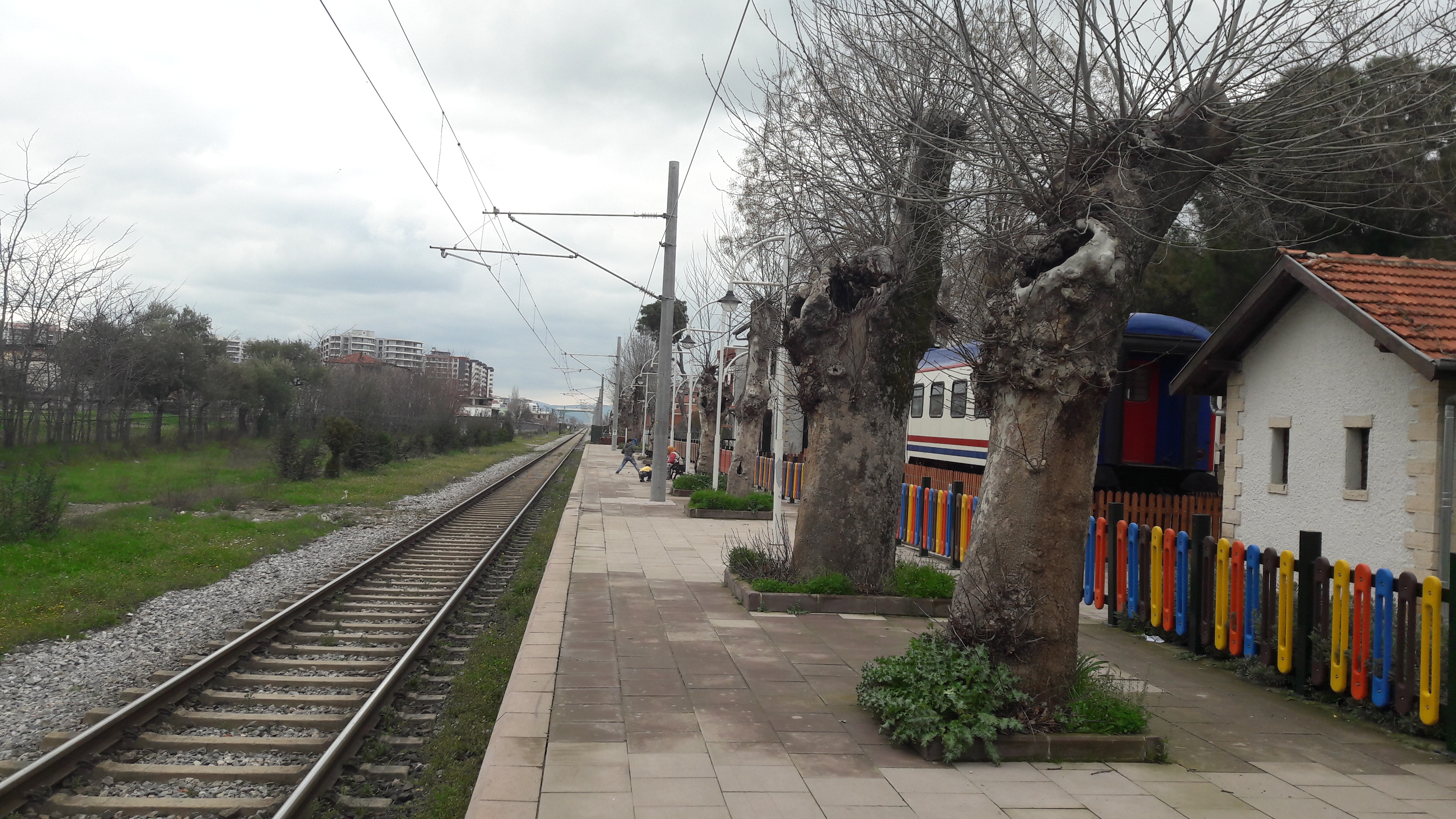
- Horozköy station with a plinthed regional railcar on the right.

General information
- Location: 6700 Sk., Fatih Mah., 45140; Yunusemre, Manisa; Turkey
- Coordinates: 38.626806°N 27.403250°E
- System: TCDD intercity and regional rail station
- Owner: Turkish State Railways
- Operator: TCDD Taşımacılık
- Line: İzmir-Afyon railway
- Platforms: 1 side platform
- Tracks: 1

Construction
- Structure type: At-grade
- Parking: Yes

History
- Opened: 10 October 1865; 160 years ago

Services
Preceding station	TCDD Taşımacılık	Following station
Muradiye towards İzmir (Basmane)	Aegean Express	Manisa towards Eskişehir
Muradiye towards İzmir (Basmane)	İzmir-Uşak	Manisa towards Uşak
Muradiye towards İzmir (Basmane)	İzmir–Alaşehir	Manisa towards Alaşehir
6 Sep Express does not stop here
17 Sep Express does not stop here
İzmir Blue Train does not stop here
Konya Blue Train does not stop here
Location

Horozköy railway station (Turkish: Horozköy Tren İstasyonu) is a station in Manisa, Turkey. Located in the Faith neighborhood in east Manisa, Horozköy consists of a side platform servicing one track. TCDD Taşımacılık operates two daily trains that stop at the station, with three other trains that do not.

Horozköy station was originally built in 1865 by the Smyrna Cassaba Railway.

== Gallery ==
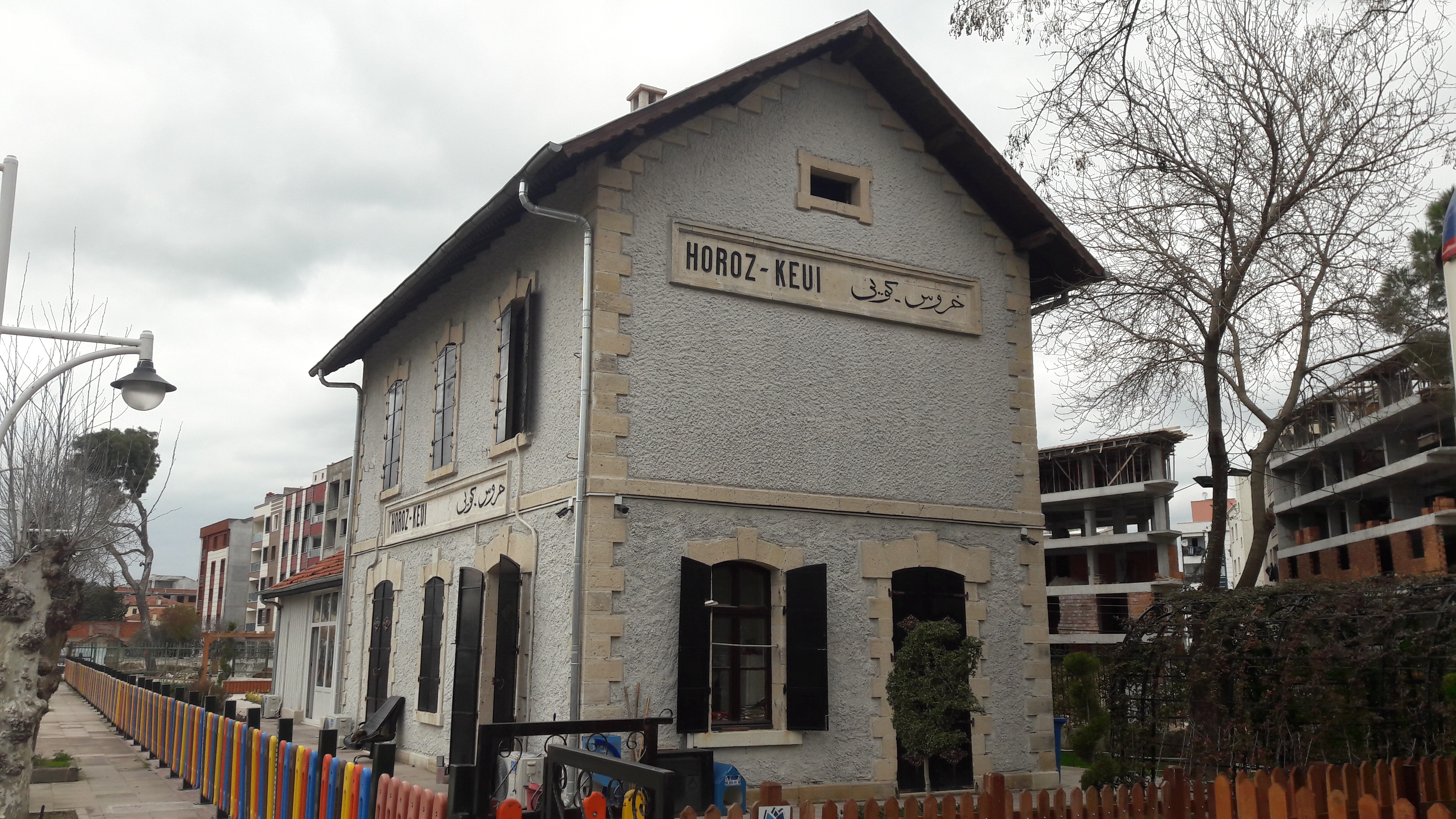
The station house, with the name written in Ottoman Turkish (left) and its anglicized name (right).
