= Ahmetli railway station =

Railway station in Turkey

Ahmetli
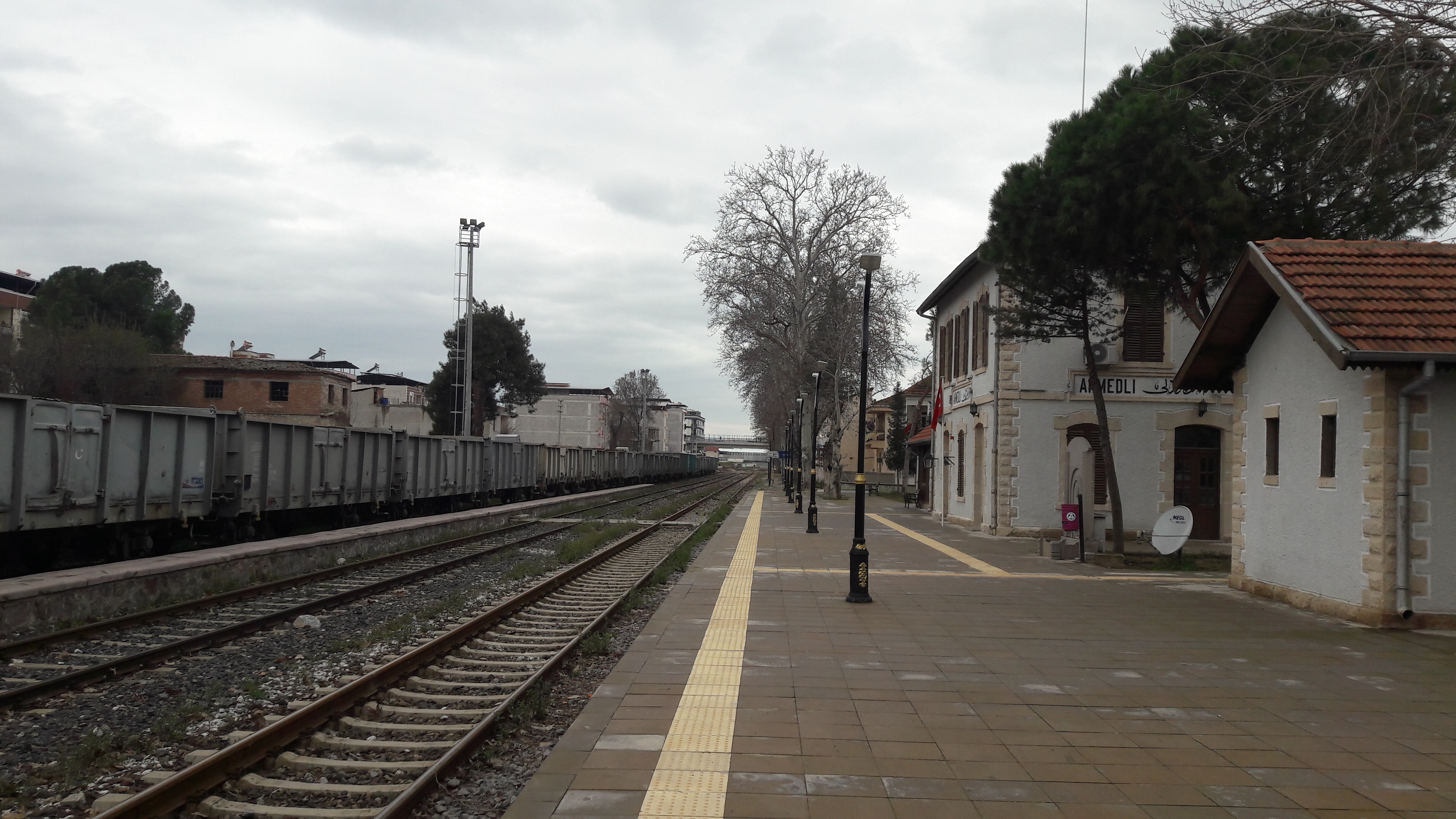
- Looking west, toward İzmir, with the station building on the right.

General information
- Location: Akasya Sk., Ulu Cami Mah. 45450; Ahmetli, Manisa; Turkey
- Coordinates: 38.5164°N 27.9359°E
- System: TCDD Taşımacılık intercity and regional rail station
- Owner: Turkish State Railways
- Operator: TCDD Taşımacılık
- Line: Konya Blue Train İzmir-Uşak İzmir–Alaşehir Manisa–Alaşehir
- Platforms: 2 (1 side platform, 1 island platform)
- Tracks: 3
- Train operators: TCDD Taşımacılık

Construction
- Parking: No
- Cycle facilities: No
- Accessible: No

History
- Opened: 13 March 1875
- Former names: Ahmedli

Services
Preceding station	TCDD Taşımacılık	Following station
Turgutlu towards İzmir (Basmane)	Konya Blue Train	Salihli towards Konya
Urganlı towards İzmir (Basmane)	İzmir-Uşak	Yaraşlı towards Uşak
Urganlı towards İzmir (Basmane)	İzmir–Alaşehir	Yaraşlı towards Alaşehir
Urganlı towards Manisa	Manisa–Alaşehir	Yaraşlı towards Alaşehir
Location

Ahmetli railway station (Turkish: Ahmetli istasyonu) is a railway station in Ahmetli, Turkey. TCDD Taşımacılık operates a daily inter-city train from İzmir to Konya and daily regional trains from İzmir to Alaşehir and Uşak, as well as from Manisa to Alaşehir.

The station was opened on 13 March 1875 as Ahmedli railway station and built by the Smyrna Cassaba Railway as part of their railway from Smyrna (modern day İzmir) to Karahisar.
