= Emiralem railway station =

Railway station in Menemen, Turkey

Emiralem
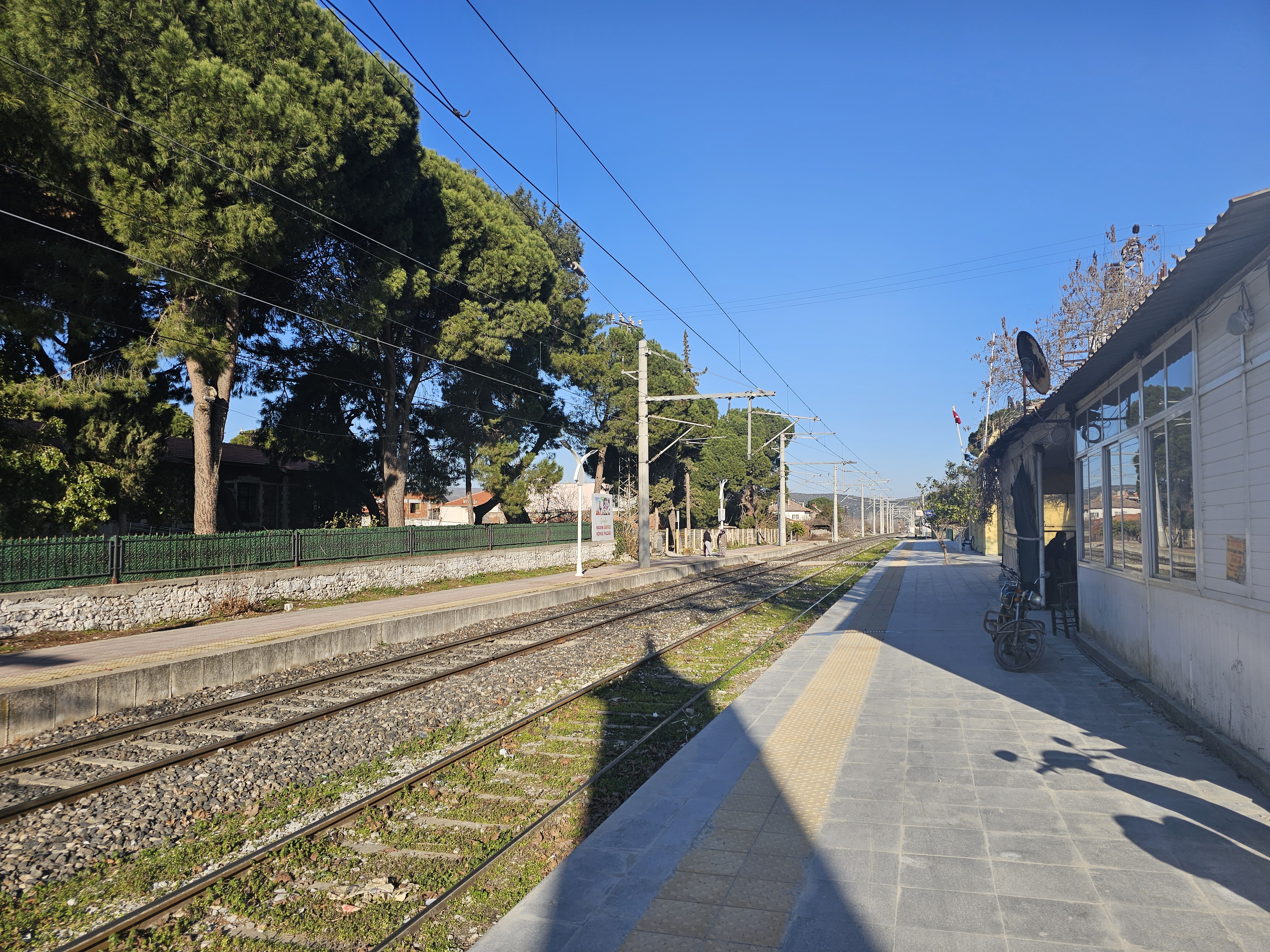

General information
- Location: 9 Eylül Kurtuluş Cd. 1A, Emiralem Merkez 35670; Menemen; Turkey
- Coordinates: 38.6245°N 27.1482°E
- Elevation: 24 m (79 ft)
- System: TCDD Transport intercity and regional rail station
- Owner: Turkish State Railways
- Operator: TCDD Transport
- Line: İzmir-Afyon railway
- Distance: 38.4 km (23.9 mi) (İzmir)
- Platforms: 2 side platforms
- Tracks: 2
- Connections: ESHOT: 747

Construction
- Structure type: At-grade
- Parking: No

Other information
- Status: In operation

History
- Opened: 10 October 1865
- Electrified: 2017 (25 kV AC, 60 Hz)
Services
Preceding station	TCDD Taşımacılık	Following station
Menemen towards İzmir (Basmane)	Aegean Express	Ayvacık towards Eskişehir
Menemen towards İzmir (Basmane)	6 Sep Express	Muradiye towards Bandırma
Menemen towards İzmir (Basmane)	17 Sep Express	Muradiye towards Bandırma
Menemen towards İzmir (Basmane)	Konya Blue Train (Westbound)	Muradiye towards Konya
Menemen towards İzmir (Basmane)	İzmir–Alaşehir	Ayvacık towards Alaşehir
Menemen towards İzmir (Basmane)	İzmir-Uşak	Ayvacık towards Uşak
İzmir Blue Train does not stop here
Location

Emiralem station is a station on the İzmir-Afyon railway just east of Menemen. It is serviced by five train services totaling 10 daily trains. The station was built in 1865 by the Smyrna Cassaba Railway and taken over by the Turkish State Railways in 1934.

== Gallery ==
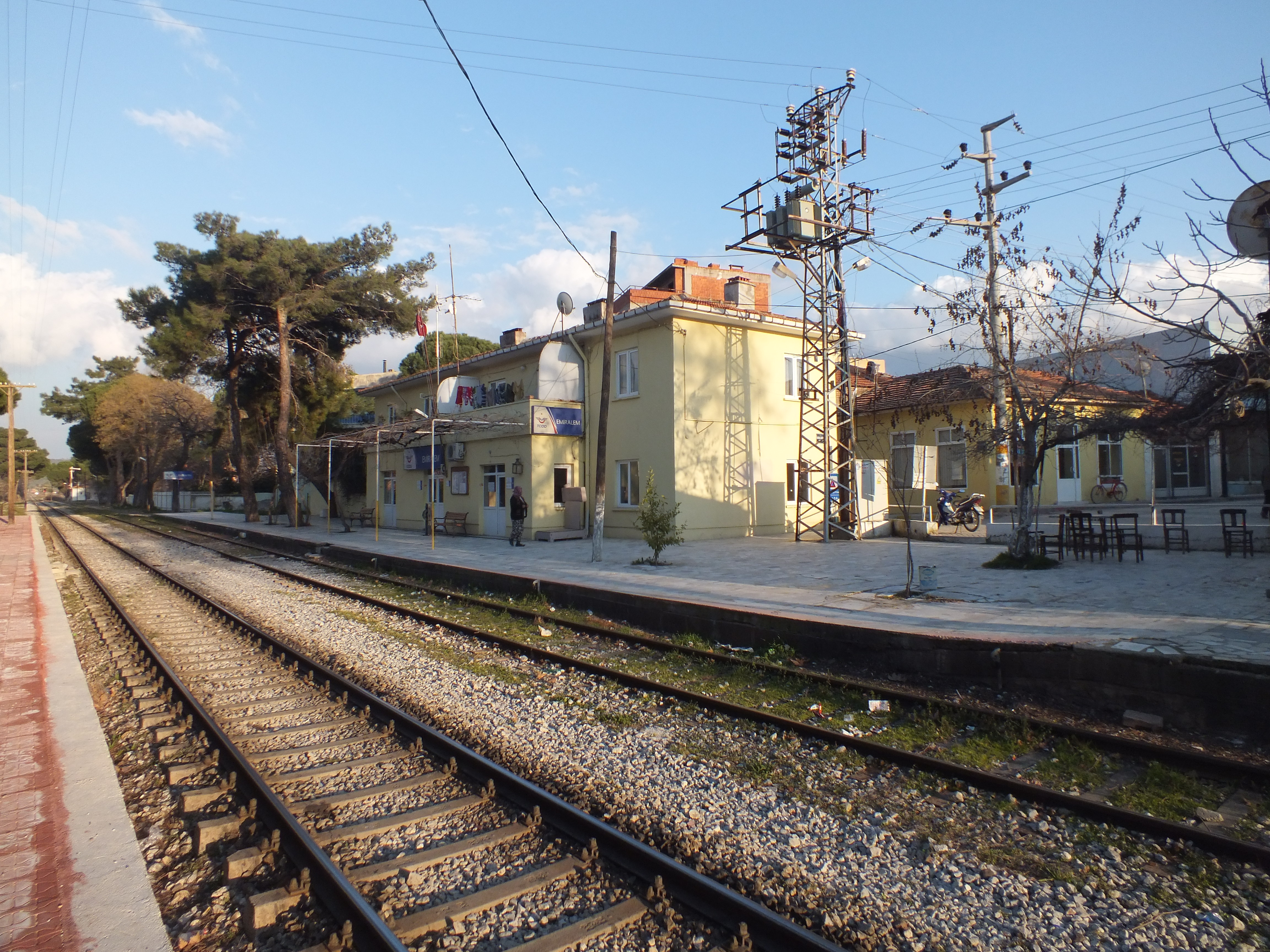
Emiralem prior to electrification.
