= Turgutlu railway station =

Railway station in Turgutlu, Turkey

Turgutlu
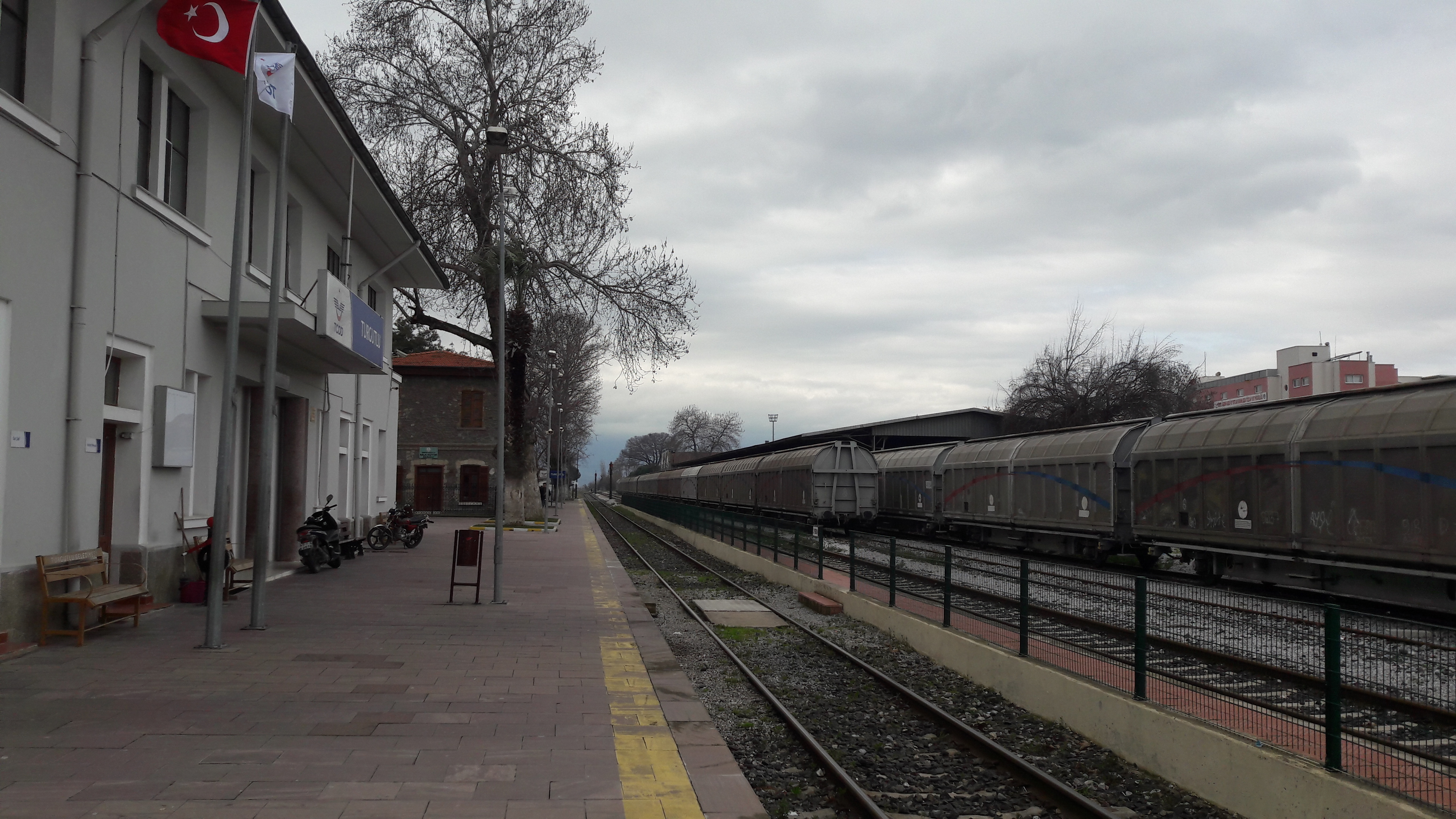

General information
- Location: Simge Sk., İstasyonaltı Mah. 45410; Turgutlu, Manisa; Turkey
- Coordinates: 38.5099°N 27.7072°E
- System: TCDD Taşımacılık intercity and regional rail station
- Owner: Turkish State Railways
- Operator: TCDD Taşımacılık
- Line: Konya Blue Train İzmir-Uşak İzmir–Alaşehir Manisa–Alaşehir
- Platforms: 2 (1 side platform, 1 island platform)
- Tracks: 2

Construction
- Parking: No
- Cycle facilities: No
- Accessible: No

History
- Opened: 10 January 1866
- Former names: Cassaba

Services
Preceding station	TCDD Taşımacılık	Following station
Manisa towards İzmir (Basmane)	Konya Blue Train	Ahmetli towards Konya
Çobanisa towards İzmir (Basmane)	İzmir-Uşak	Urganlı towards Uşak
Çobanisa towards İzmir (Basmane)	İzmir–Alaşehir	Urganlı towards Alaşehir
Çobanisa towards Manisa	Manisa–Alaşehir	Urganlı towards Alaşehir
Future service
Manisa towards İzmir (Alsancak)	Yüksek Hızlı Tren	Salihli towards Ankara
Halkapınar towards İzmir (Alsancak)	Yüksek Hızlı Tren	Salihli towards Ankara
Location

Turgutlu railway station (Turkish: Turgutlu garı) is a railway station in Turgutlu, Turkey and is the only station within the city. TCDD Taşımacılık operates a daily inter-city train from İzmir to Konya and a daily regional train to İzmir to Uşak.

The station was opened on 10 January 1866 as Cassaba railway station and built by the Smyrna Cassaba Railway as part of their railway from Smyrna (modern day İzmir). Cassaba was the railway original terminus and one of Turkey's oldest railway stations. The railway was later extended further east to Karahisar.
