= Sart railway station =

Railway station in Turkey

Sart
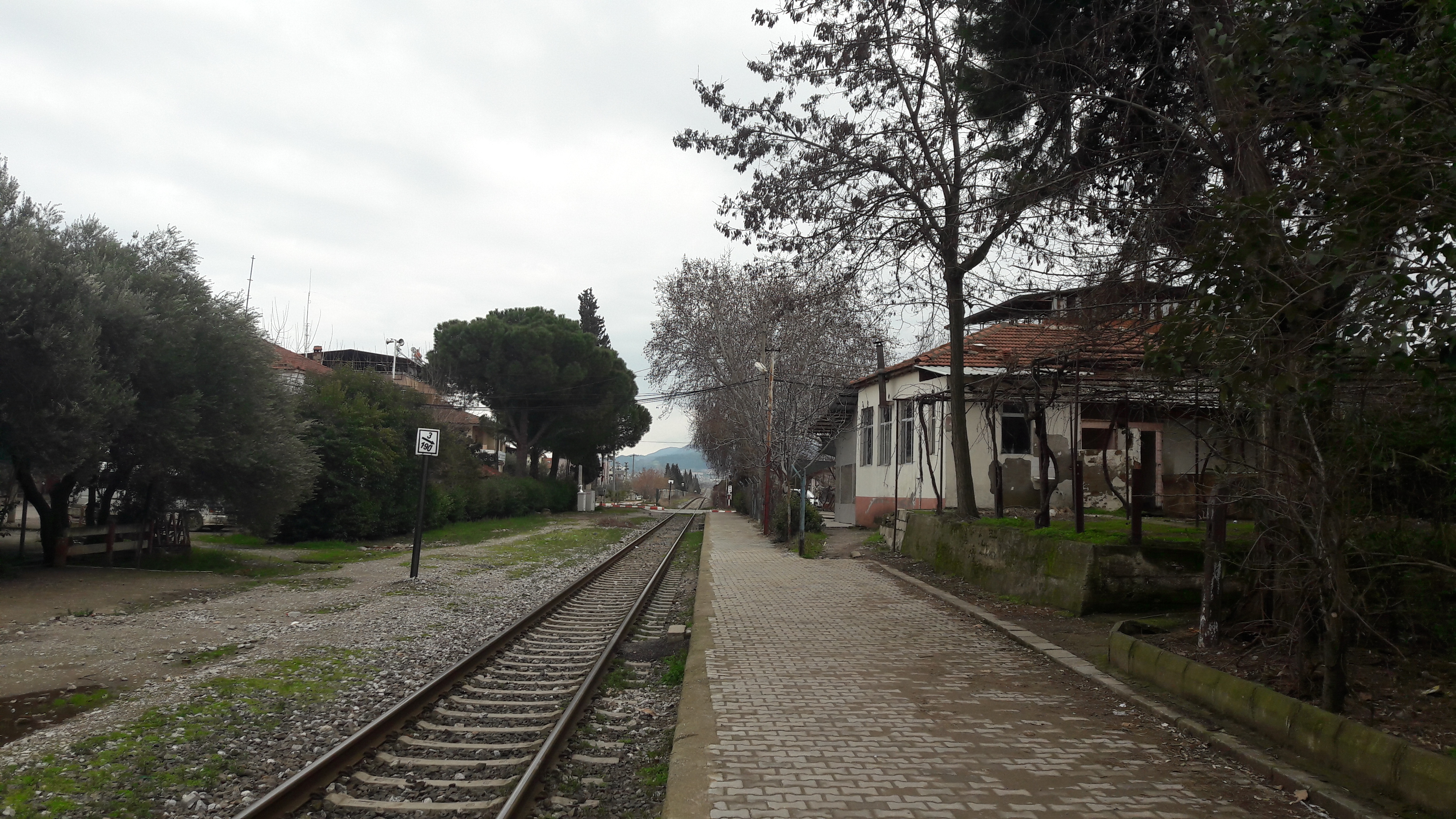
- Looking east, toward Afyon.

General information
- Location: Milli Egemenlik Cd., 45370; Sart, Manisa; Turkey
- Coordinates: 38.4974°N 28.0419°E
- System: TCDD Taşımacılık regional rail station
- Owner: Turkish State Railways
- Operator: TCDD Taşımacılık
- Line: İzmir-Uşak İzmir–Alaşehir Manisa–Alaşehir
- Platforms: 1 side platform
- Tracks: 1

Construction
- Cycle facilities: No

Services
Preceding station	TCDD Taşımacılık	Following station
Yaraşlı towards İzmir (Basmane)	İzmir-Uşak	Salihli towards Uşak
Yaraşlı towards İzmir (Basmane)	İzmir–Alaşehir	Salihli towards Alaşehir
Yaraşlı towards Manisa	Manisa–Alaşehir	Salihli towards Alaşehir
Location

Sart railway station (Turkish: Sart istasyonu) is a railway station in Sart, Turkey. TCDD Taşımacılık operates two daily regional trains from İzmir to Alaşehir and Uşak along with one daily regional train from Manisa to Alaşehir.

The station has a single side platform, serving one track.
