= Ayvacık railway station =

Railway station in Menemen, Turkey

Ayvacık
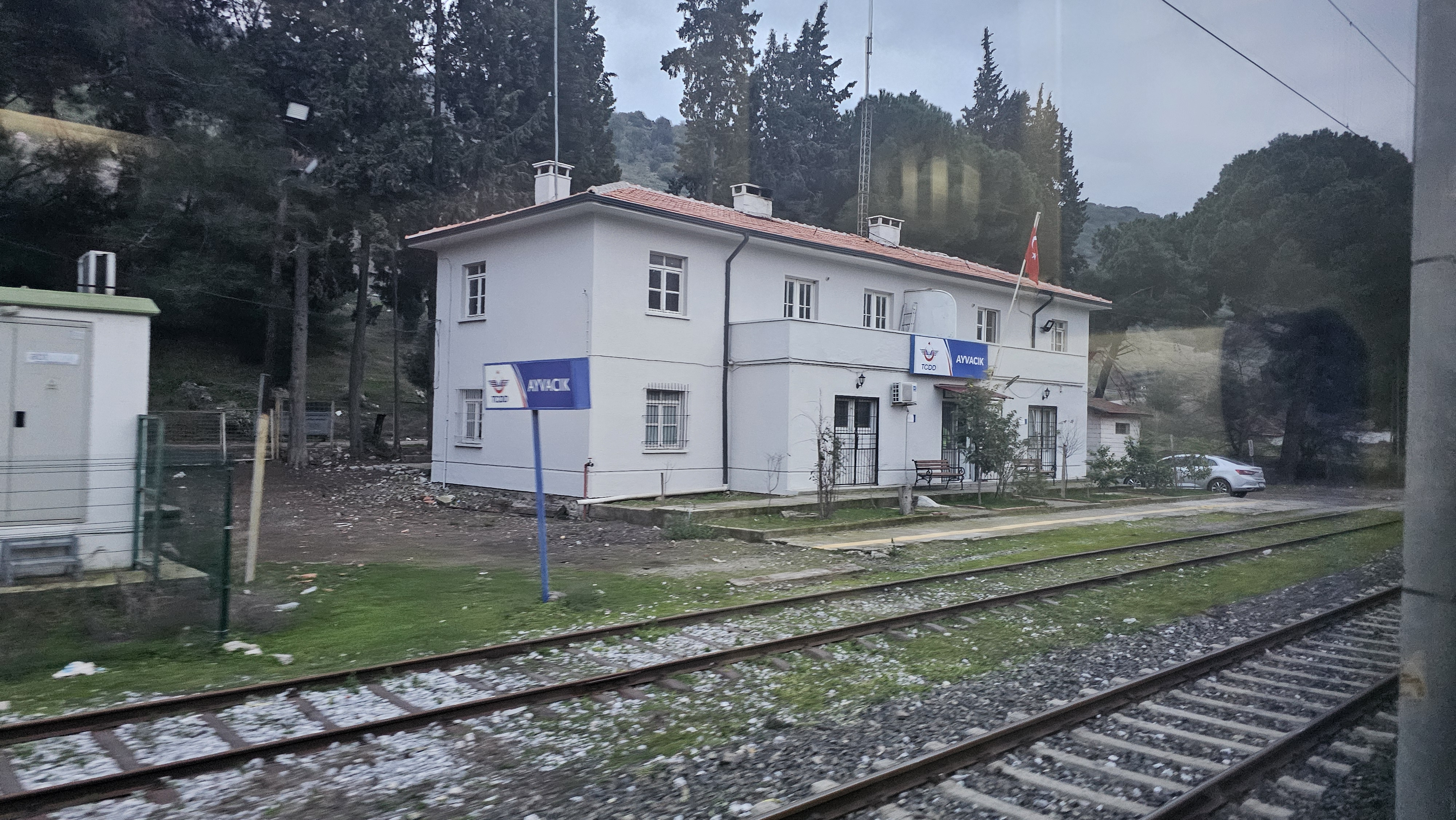
- The station building with its short side platform.

General information
- Location: Manisa Asfaltlı Cd., Çaltı Köyü 35660, Menemen, İzmir
- Coordinates: 38.6358°N 27.2120°E
- System: TCDD inter-city and regional rail station
- Owner: Turkish State Railways
- Line: İzmir-Afyon railway
- Platforms: 1 side platform
- Tracks: 3

History
- Opened: 10 October 1865

Services
Preceding station	TCDD Taşımacılık	Following station
Emiralem towards İzmir (Basmane)	Aegean Express	Muradiye towards Eskişehir
Emiralem towards İzmir (Basmane)	İzmir–Alaşehir (Westbound)	Muradiye towards Alaşehir
Emiralem towards İzmir (Basmane)	İzmir-Uşak (Westbound)	Muradiye towards Uşak
İzmir Blue Train does not stop here
Konya Blue Train does not stop here
6 Sep Express does not stop here
17 Sep Express does not stop here
Location

Ayvacık railway station (Turkish: Ayvacık istasyonu) a station on the İzmir-Afyon railway situated on the southern bank of the Gediz River. It is owned by the Turkish State Railways which operates several daily trains through the station. Since ridership is low, the station is mainly used as a siding to allow trains to pass one-another.
