= Muradiye railway station =

Railway station in Muradiye

Muradiye
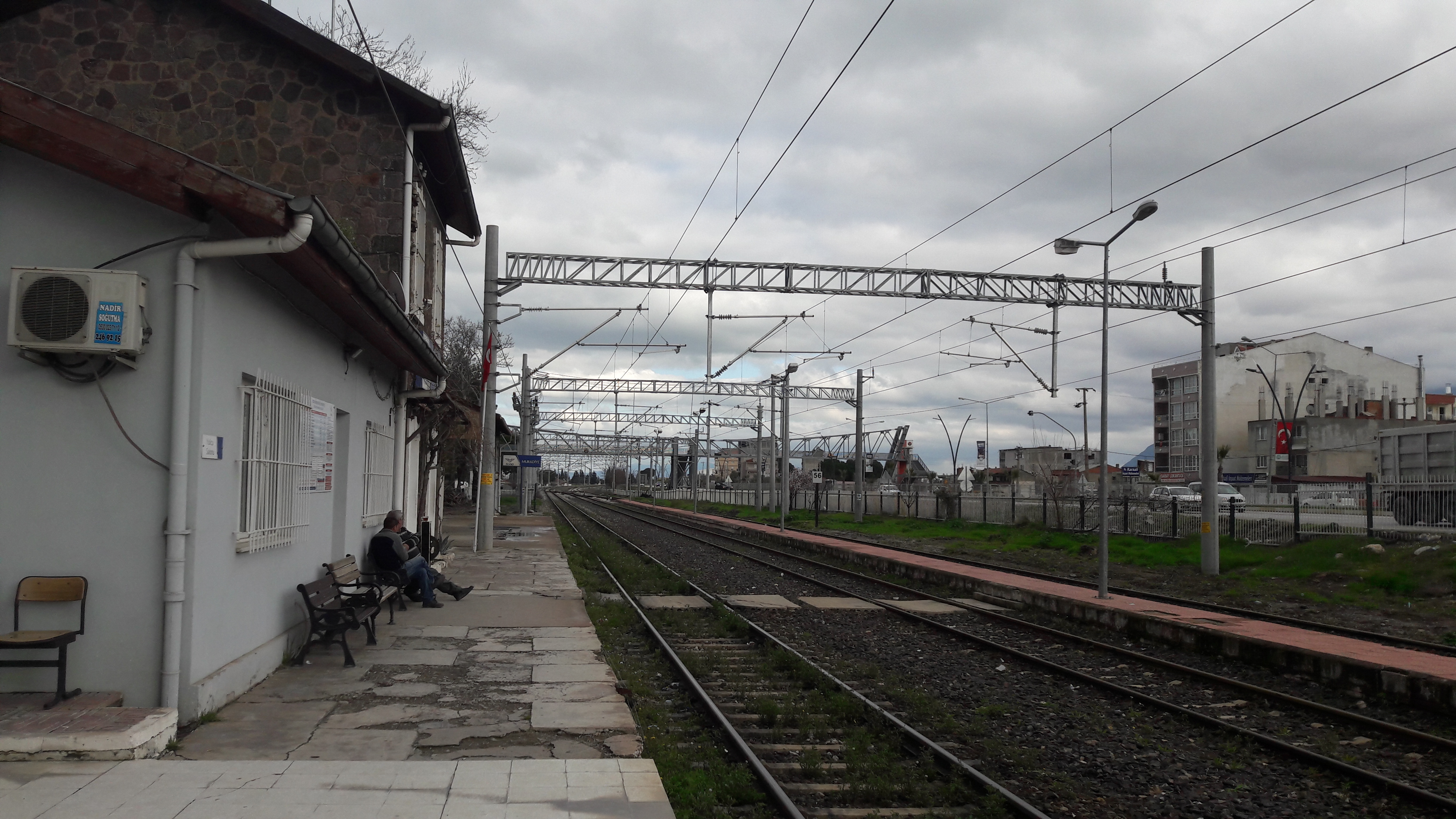
- Muradiye station after electrification.

General information
- Location: İstasyon Cd., Muradiye Mah., 45140 Yunusemre/Manisa; Turkey
- Coordinates: 38.651277°N 27.328472°E
- System: TCDD intercity and regional rail station
- Owner: Turkish State Railways
- Operator: TCDD Taşımacılık
- Line: İzmir–Afyon railway
- Platforms: 2 (1 side platform, 1 island platform)
- Tracks: 3
- Connections: Manisa Private Suburban Buses routes 18, 20, 21, 22 by 141 Muradiye Coop. Manisa City Buses routes 253, 306 by MANULAŞ

Construction
- Structure type: At-grade
- Parking: Yes
- Accessible: limited

Other information
- Fare zone: TCDD district 3

History
- Opened: 10 October 1865; 160 years ago as Hamidiye

Services
Preceding station	TCDD Taşımacılık	Following station
Menemen towards İzmir (Basmane)	İzmir Blue Train	Manisa towards Ankara
Ayvacık towards İzmir (Basmane)	Aegean Express	Horozköy towards Eskişehir
Menemen towards İzmir (Basmane)	6 Sep Express	Manisa towards Bandırma
Ayvacık towards İzmir (Basmane)	17 Sep Express	Manisa towards Bandırma
Ayvacık towards İzmir (Basmane)	Konya Blue Train	Manisa towards Konya
Ayvacık towards İzmir (Basmane)	İzmir-Uşak	Horozköy towards Uşak
Ayvacık towards İzmir (Basmane)	İzmir–Alaşehir	Horozköy towards Alaşehir
Location

Muradiye station (Turkish: Muradiye istasyonu) is a station in Muradiye, Yunusemre, Turkey, just 3.5 km (2.2 mi) from Manisa. TCDD Taşımacılık operates six trains, all terminating at Basmane Terminal in İzmir, totaling to 12 daily trains by January 2020.

Muradiye station was originally built in 1865 by the Smyrna Cassaba Railway.

== Gallery ==
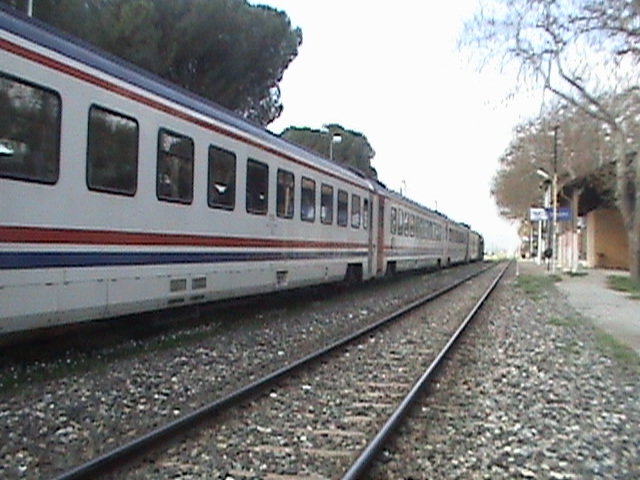
The 9 Sept. Express at Muradiye in 2008, before electrification.
