= Çiğli railway station =

Railway station in Çiğli, İzmir, Turkey

Çiğli
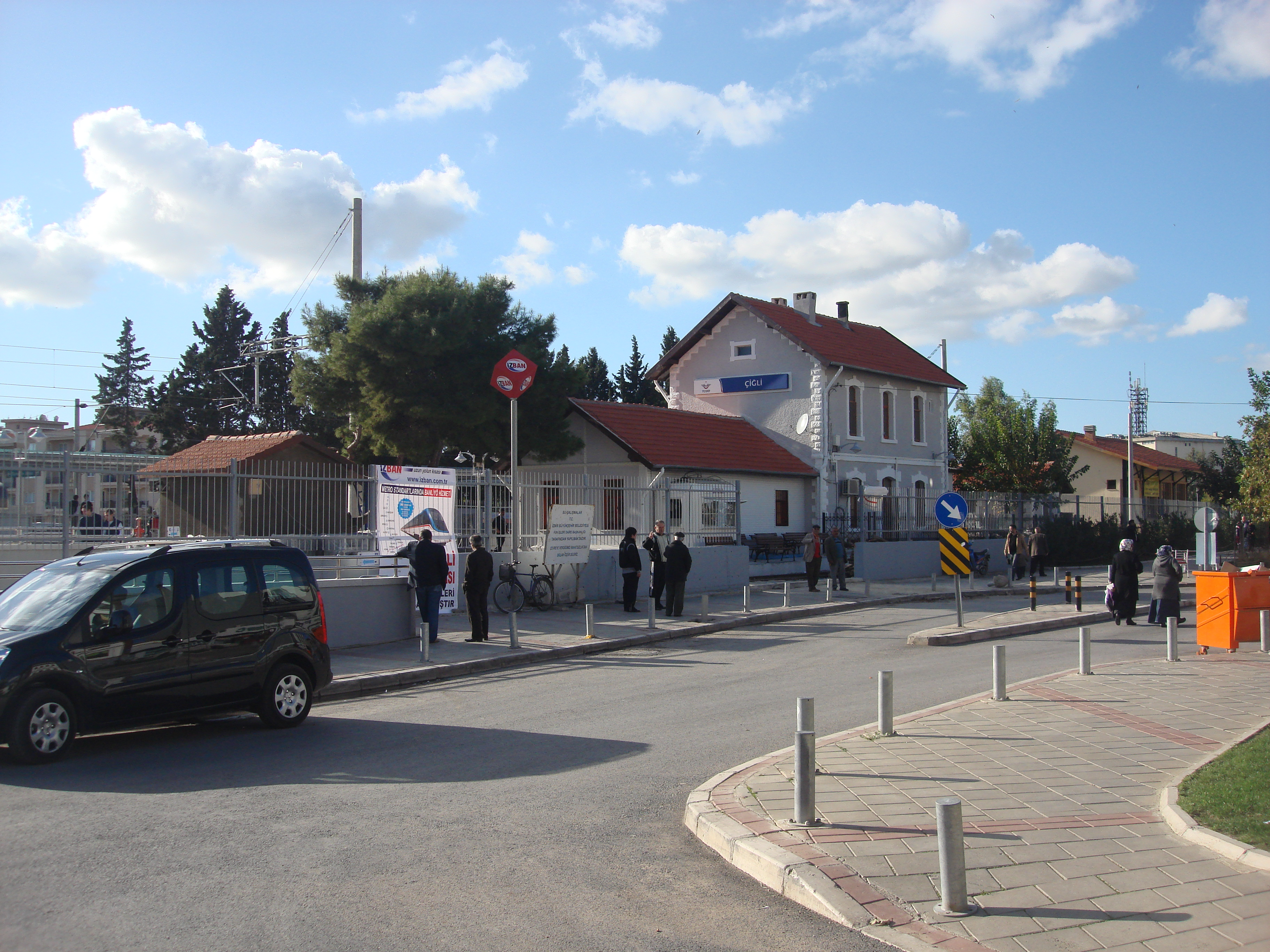
- The station building in December 2010.

General information
- Location: Semra Aksu Cd., İstasyonaltı, 35630; Çiğli/İzmir; Turkey
- Coordinates: 38.4920°N 27.0631°E
- System: TCDD intercity and regional rail station İZBAN commuter rail station
- Owner: Turkish State Railways
- Operator: TCDD Taşımacılık; İZBAN A.Ş.
- Line: İzmir-Afyon railway
- Platforms: 2 island platforms
- Tracks: 7
- Connections: T3 Çiğli Tram at Semra Aksu tram station ESHOT Bus: 123,149, 247, 329, 342, 344, 529, 547, 751, 816, 817

Construction
- Parking: No
- Cycle facilities: No
- Accessible: Yes

History
- Opened: 10 November 1865
- Closed: 2008–10
- Rebuilt: 2008
- Electrified: 6 May 2004; 25 kV AC, 50 Hz OHLE

Services
Preceding station	TCDD Taşımacılık	Following station
İzmir (Basmane) Terminus	İzmir Blue Train	Menemen towards Ankara
İzmir (Basmane) Terminus	Aegean Express	Menemen towards Eskişehir
İzmir (Basmane) Terminus	6 Sep Express	Menemen towards Bandırma
İzmir (Basmane) Terminus	17 Sep Express	Menemen towards Bandırma
İzmir (Basmane) Terminus	Konya Blue Train	Menemen towards Konya
İzmir (Basmane) Terminus	İzmir–Alaşehir	Menemen towards Alaşehir
İzmir (Basmane) Terminus	İzmir-Uşak	Menemen towards Uşak
Preceding station	İZBAN	Following station
Mavişehir towards Cumaovası	Aliağa-Cumaovası	Ata Sanayi towards Aliağa
Mavişehir towards Tepeköy	Aliağa-Tepeköy (Late nights)	Ata Sanayi towards Aliağa
Mavişehir towards Tepeköy	Menemen-Tepeköy	Ata Sanayi towards Menemen
Former services
Preceding station	Turkish State Railways	Following station
Karşıyaka towards İzmir (Basmane)	9 Sep Express	Ulukent towards Ankara
İzmir (Basmane) Terminus	Karesi Express	Menemen towards Balıkesir
Şemikler towards İzmir (Basmane)	Çiğli suburban	Terminus
Location

Çiğli railway station (Turkish: Çiğli garı) is a railway station in İzmir, Turkey. The station is within the Çiğli district of the city and is a stop for all trains on the line. İZBAN operates commuter trains north to Aliağa and Menemen and south to Cumaovası and Tepeköy. TCDD Taşımacılık operates seven trains, five intercity and two regional, from İzmir (Basmane) to Eskişehir, Bandırma, Balıkesir, Soma, Uşak and Alaşehir.

Çiğli was the northern terminus of the Çiğli suburban for 140 years, since the service began in 1865 until it ended in 2005.

There is a transfer from the station to the T3 Tram Line and ESHOT buses.

== Connections ==
ESHOT operates regional bus service, accessible from the station.

ESHOT Bus service
Route number	Stop	Route	Location
123	Çiğli Aktarma Merkezi	Şirinevler – Çiğli Aktarma Merkezi	Semra Aksu Street
149	Çiğli Aktarma Merkezi	Kaklıç – Çiğli Aktarma Merkezi	Semra Aksu Street
247	Çiğli Aktarma Merkezi	Evka 6 – Çiğli Aktarma Merkezi	Semra Aksu Street
329	Çiğli Aktarma Merkezi	Güzeltepe – Çiğli Aktarma Merkezi	Semra Aksu Street
342	Çiğli Aktarma Merkezi	Egekent – Çiğli Aktarma Merkezi	Semra Aksu Street
344	Çiğli Aktarma Merkezi	Evka 2 – Çiğli Aktarma Merkezi	Semra Aksu Street
529	Çiğli Aktarma Merkezi	Yakakent Mahallesi – Çiğli Aktarma Merkezi	Semra Aksu Street
547	Çiğli Aktarma Merkezi	Çiğli Aktarma Merkezi – Bostanlı İskele	Semra Aksu Street
751	Çiğli Aktarma Merkezi	Sasalı – Çiğli Aktarma Merkezi	Semra Aksu Street
816	Çiğli Aktarma Merkezi	Çiğli Bölge Eğitim Hastanesi – Egekent Aktarma Merkezi	Semra Aksu Street
817	Çiğli Aktarma Merkezi	Egekent Aktarma Merkezi – Çiğli Aktarma Merkezi	Semra Aksu Street
