= Ata Sanayi railway station =

Ata Sanayi
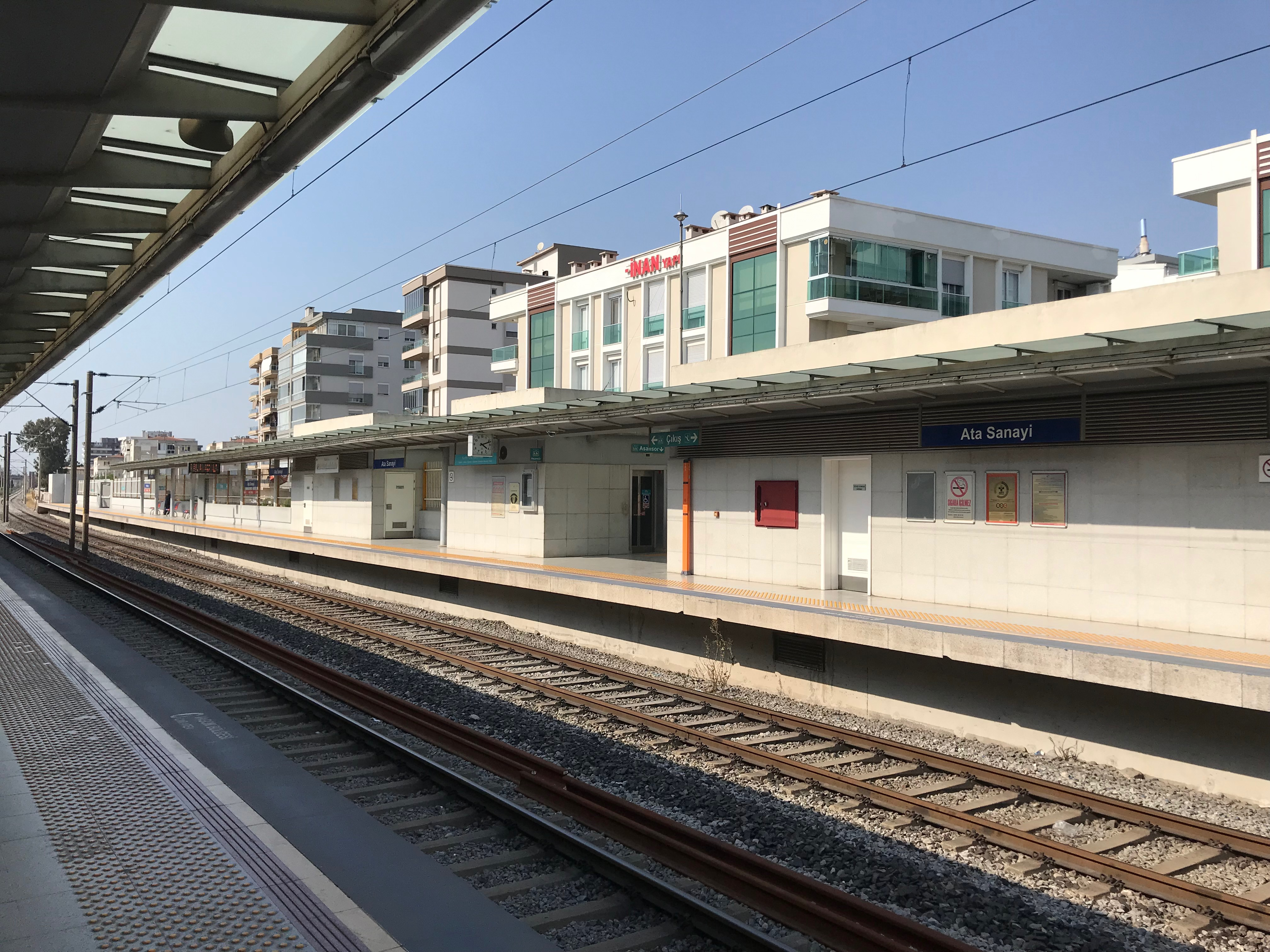

General information
- Location: Yeni Mah., 1671/1 Sk. 849-1, 35620; Çiğli, İzmir; Turkey
- Coordinates: 38.4990°N 27.0534°E
- Elevation: 4 m (13 ft)
- System: İZBAN commuter rail station
- Owner: Turkish State Railways
- Operator: İZBAN
- Line: İzmir-Afyon railway
- Distance: 38.1 km (23.7 mi) (Aliağa); 69.7 km (43.3 mi) (Tepeköy)
- Platforms: 2 side platforms
- Tracks: 2
- Connections: ESHOT: 744, 752

Construction
- Structure type: At-grade
- Parking: No
- Accessible: Yes

Other information
- Status: In operation

History
- Opened: 30 January 2011
- Electrified: 25 kV AC, 15 Hz

Services
Preceding station	İZBAN	Following station
Çiğli towards Cumaovası	Aliağa-Cumaovası	Egekent towards Aliağa
Çiğli towards Tepeköy	Aliağa-Tepeköy (Late nights)	Egekent towards Aliağa
Çiğli towards Tepeköy	Menemen-Tepeköy	Egekent towards Menemen
Location

Ata Sanayi railway station (Turkish: Ata Sanayi istasyonu) is a railway station on the İzmir-Afyon railway in Çiğli, İzmir. The station is serviced by İZBAN commuter trains and located within the Central Line of the İZBAN network with trains running north to Menemen and Aliağa and south to Alsancak, Cumaovası and Tepeköy.

== History ==
Ata Sanayi station is one of the newer stations on the İZBAN system. The location of the station was previously a grade crossing for 8759 Street, which was subsequently removed. On 25 February 2006, the Turkish State Railways truncated all trains on the line to Çiğli to allow for the construction of the Karşıyaka rail tunnel to begin. Following this, the construction of Ata Sanayi station began shortly after. Despite the location of the station still being within the active section of the railway (being the next station following Çiğli), the platforms and station facilities were constructed nevertheless. In 2008, TCDD further truncated all train service from Çiğli to Ulukent, allowing for the construction of the station underpass. Ata Sanayi station was completed in the latter half of 2008 but did not see train service for another three years. On 19 May 2010, TCDD resumed its train service back to Basmane station in central İzmir, but trains did not stop at Ata Sanayi. It wasn't until 29 October 2010, when İZBAN began testing trains on its northern line. On 5 December 2010, İZBAN began limited service between Alsancak and Çiğli, while testing continued beyond Çiğli. Ata Sanayi opened on 30 January 2011, with the extension of İZBAN's northern line from Çiğli to Aliağa.

== Location and Layout ==
Ata Sanyi is located within İZBAN's Central Line (Menemen-Cumaovası), seeing train service within a 12-minute window. Trains stopping at Ata Sanayi run between Menemen-Tepeköy and Aliağa-Cumaovası, running on an alternating 24-minute service pattern and allowing for a 12-minute service pattern between Menemen and Cumaovası. While ESHOT does offer any direct bus connections, a walking connection can be made to the Çiğli Santral stop, located along Anadolu Avenue. ESHOT operates 13 lines that stop at Çiğli Santral: 428, 446, 535, 595, 602, 608, 660, 800, 820, 827, 830, 912 and 920.

=== Station Layout ===
Ata Sanayi has two 2 side platforms servicing 2 tracks.

L Ground/Concourse	Customer service	Tickets/Exits
Level; L1	Side platform, doors will open on the right
Level; L1	Platform 1	İZBAN to Menemen or Aliağa (Egekent) ←
Level; L1	Platform 2	İZBAN to Cumaovası or Tepeköy (Çiğli) →
Level; L1	Side platform, doors will open on the right
