= Salihli railway station =

Salihli
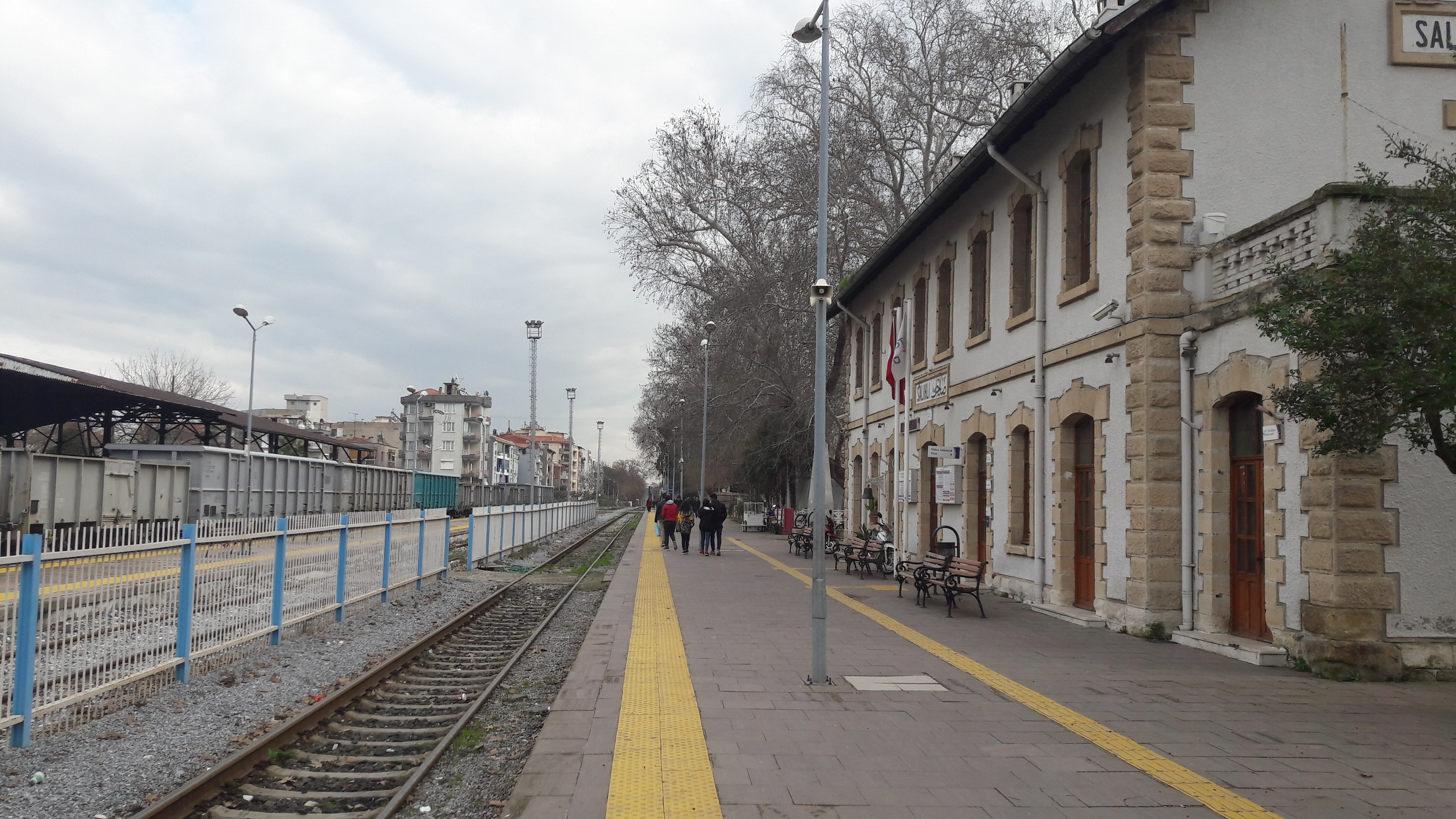
- Looking west, toward Afyon with the station building on the right.

General information
- Location: 87 Sk., Zafer Mah. 45300; Salihli, Manisa; Turkey
- Coordinates: 38.4828°N 28.1308°E
- System: TCDD Taşımacılık intercity and regional rail station
- Owner: Turkish State Railways
- Operator: TCDD Taşımacılık
- Line: Konya Blue Train İzmir-Uşak İzmir–Alaşehir Manisa–Alaşehir
- Platforms: 1 side platform
- Tracks: 1

Construction
- Cycle facilities: No

History
- Opened: 13 March 1875

Services
Preceding station	TCDD Taşımacılık	Following station
Ahmetli towards İzmir (Basmane)	Konya Blue Train	Kavaklıdere towards Konya
Sart towards İzmir (Basmane)	İzmir-Uşak	Gümüşçayı towards Uşak
Sart towards İzmir (Basmane)	İzmir–Alaşehir	Gümüşçayı towards Alaşehir
Sart towards Manisa	Manisa–Alaşehir	Gümüşçayı towards Alaşehir
Future service
Turgutlu towards İzmir (Alsancak)	Yüksek Hızlı Tren	Uşak towards Ankara
Location
- Location within Turkey

Salihli railway station (Turkish: Salihli garı) is a railway station in Salihli, Turkey and is the only station within the city. TCDD Taşımacılık operates a daily inter-city train from İzmir to Konya and a daily regional train to İzmir to Uşak.

The station was originally built by the Smyrna Cassaba Railway in 1875 as part of their railway from Smyrna (modern-day İzmir) to Karahisar. Salihli station consists of a single side platform, serving one track. A small freight yard and freight house are located adjacent to the station.
