= Çay railway station =

Railway station in Çay, Turkey

Çay
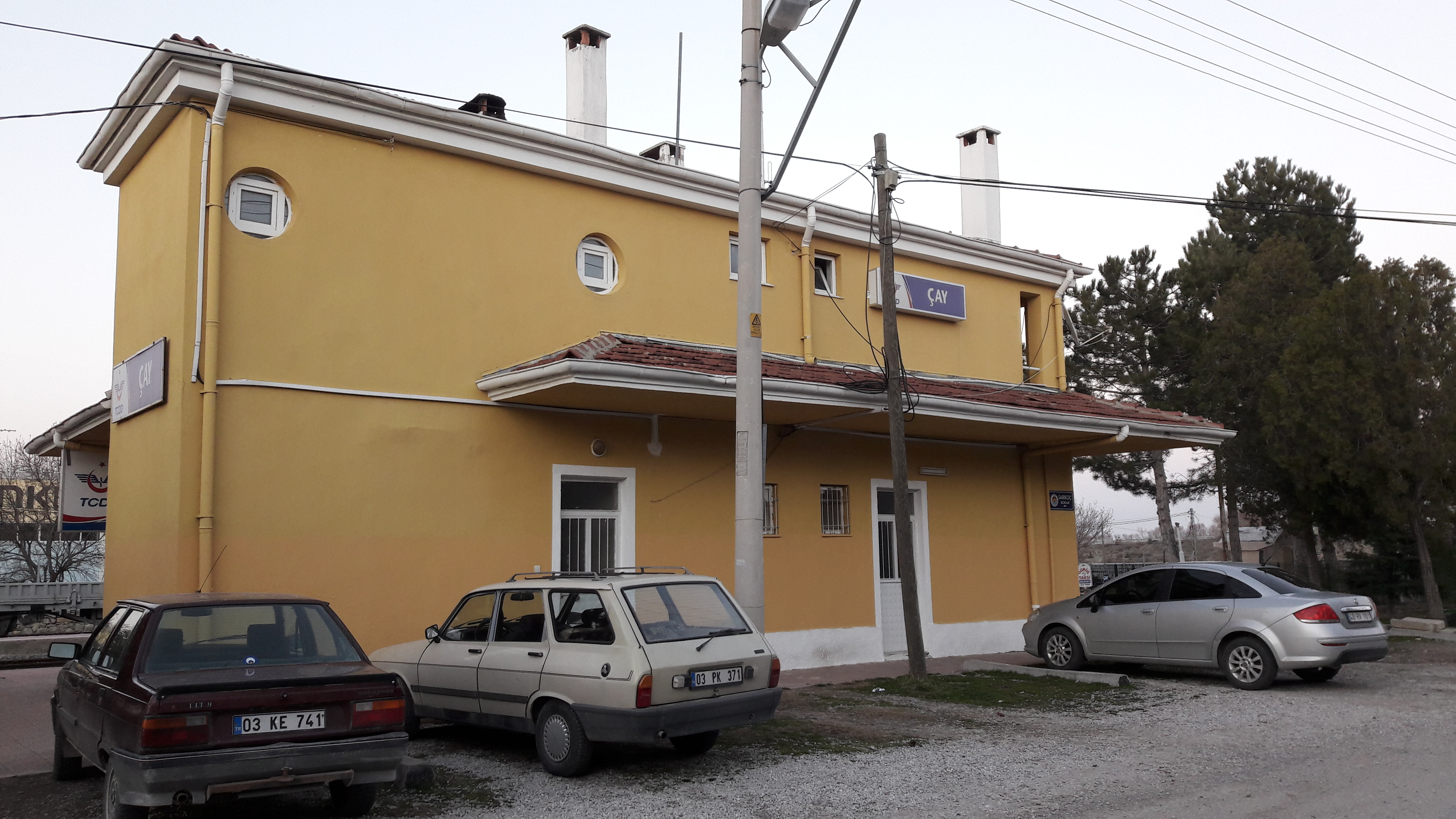
- The station building at dusk.

General information
- Location: İstasyon Mah., 03700; Çay, Afyon; Turkey
- Coordinates: 38.6280°N 31.0353°E
- System: TCDD Taşımacılık intercity rail station
- Owner: Turkish State Railways
- Operator: TCDD Taşımacılık
- Line: Konya Blue Train
- Platforms: 2 (1 side platform, 1 island platform)
- Tracks: 3
- Train operators: TCDD Taşımacılık

Construction
- Parking: No
- Cycle facilities: No
- Accessible: No

History
- Opened: 29 July 1896

Services
Preceding station	TCDD Taşımacılık	Following station
Büyükçobanlar towards İzmir (Basmane)	Konya Blue Train	Sultandağı towards Konya
Location

Çay railway station (Turkish: Çay istasyonu) is a railway station in Çay, Turkey. TCDD Taşımacılık operates a daily inter-city train from İzmir to Konya which stops at the station at night. The station is located just off the D.675 state highway, 4 km (2.5 mi) north of the town of Çay.

Çay station was built in 1896 by the Ottoman Anatolian Railway.
