= 9th of September Express =

- The westbound train waiting to depart Ankara.

Overview
- Service type: Intercity rail
- Status: Discontinued
- Locale: Western Turkey
- First service: 9 September 2003
- Last service: 16 January 2010
- Former operator: Turkish State Railways
- Ridership: 221,098 (2008)

Route
- Termini: Basmane station, İzmir; Ankara station, Ankara
- Stops: 31
- Distance travelled: 824 km (512 mi)
- Average journey time: 13 hours, 25 minutes (Eastbound); 13 hours, 6 minutes (Westbound)
- Service frequency: Daily each way
- Train number: 21035, 31035

On-board services
- Class: Coach class/first class sleeper service
- Seating arrangements: 2+1 open seating
- Sleeping arrangements: Private rooms (2 beds)
- Catering facilities: Dining Car

Technical
- Rolling stock: TVS2000
- Track gauge: 1,435 mm (4 ft 8 1/2 in)
- Operating speed: 120 km/h (75 mph) (Max.)
- Track owner: TCDD

The 9th of September Express (Turkish: 9 Eylül Ekspresi) was an overnight passenger train operated by the Turkish State Railways, running daily between Ankara and İzmir. The train was inaugurated on 9 September 2003 and ran until 20 January 2010, when it was subsequently discontinued. The train is named after 9 September 1922, the date of the liberation of İzmir during the Turkish War of Independence.

== History ==
The 9th of September Express entered service on 9 September 2003 as the third daily train running between Ankara and İzmir. Running alongside the limited-stop İzmir Blue Train and the slower Karesi Express the 9th of September Express departed in the late evening, after the departures of the other two trains, and was the fastest of all three, making the journey in roughly 13 hours and 6/25 minutes. The shorter Aegean Express also ran on the same route from İzmir to Eskişehir. Originally categorized as a "Super Express", a faster trains service above the standard "Express", the 9th of September Express ran between Ankara station in Ankara and Basmane station in İzmir, with the starting price of a coach ticket being TL20 million ($14.45). During its first months of service, the 9th of September Express consisted of two open coach cars, a compartment coach car, a couchette car, a sleeping car, and a dining car. This offered a mix of service compared to the İzmir Blue Train which offered only coach and sleeper berths, while the Karesi Express offered only coach and couchette berths. However, this later changed soon after as the 9th of September Express dropped its couchette and compartment coach berths, instead running with only coach and sleeper berths.

Due to modernization and expansion projects on the railways, the 9th of September Express was prone to several route cuts over its lifetime. The first route cut happened on 25 February 2006, when the western end of the route was truncated by 17 km (11 mi), from Basmane station to Çiğli, due to the construction of the Karşıyaka rail tunnel and wider İZBAN commuter rail project. Direct express bus service was offered between Basmane and Çiğli with a stop at Karşıyaka, using city buses belonging to ESHOT. The eastern portion of the route, between Ankara and Eskişehir, was also cut for a few days between 13-17 February and again between 5-10 March 2007. This was done due to the construction of the Ankara-Istanbul high-speed railway. In October 2007, the route was truncated by a further 7 km (4.3 mi) from Çiğli to Ulukent. This was done due to the closure of the siding tracks at Çiğli station, to allow for the expansion of its platforms. Following this closure, trains were stored on the sidings at Menemen, 7 km (4.3 mi) north of Ulukent.

Starting in June 2008, the Turkish State Railways began offering combined train/bus service from Ankara to Ayvalık and Akçay on the Aegean Sea for the summer season. Passengers would transfer to bus service at Balıkesir and continue west in the morning, with the return bus departing Ayvalık at 21:00 in the evening, arriving in Balıkesir in time to connect to the eastbound train back to Ankara.

On 28 December 2009, the State Railways announced that the 9th of September Express would be temporarily suspended on 16 January 2010 to allow for renovation works on the Kütahya-Balıkesir railway. However, the İzmir Blue Train and Karesi Express would not be affected and would continue to run normally. The 9th of September Express made its final journey on 16 January, arriving at its destination on 17 January. On 8 June 2010, Minister of Transport Binali Yıldırım stated that the train was suspended due to operating costs, in response to a question regarding the trains cancellation. He cited a 2009 report by TCDD which listed the 9th of September Express as among the fiscally worst performing intercity trains, along with the Erzurum Express, Karaelmas Express, and the 4th of September Blue Train. While this did not mean that the train ran empty, it meant that the train was performing poorly compared to alternative modes of transport between the two cities, such as automobile, bus, and airplane traffic. In response to criticism from the Union of Transportation Workers (Birleşik Taşımacılık Çalışanları Sendikası or BTS) towards TCDD's commercial viability focus of trains, he defended the decision claiming that the suspension was necessary to allow for construction works to progress and that alternative train connections were still operating on the same route. Yıldırım also promised that the train would be reinstated once renewal works were completed, which eventually never came to be. Thus the 9th of September Express was effectively discontinued.

== Equipment ==
Like the other trains in Turkey classified as "Super Expresses", the 9th of September Express consisted almost exclusively of TVS2000 passenger cars. These included second-class coach cars with 2+1 seating, a first-class sleeping car with private 2-bed berths, and a dining car. For head-end power a generator car was also hooked up between the locomotive and the rest of the train. The dining car would separate the coach section from the sleeping car section, while the sleeping car would be attached at the very back of the train. As for motive power, the 9th of September Express would usually have a DE22000 diesel-electric locomotive pulling it for the entire trip, while occasionally swapping motive power with a DE33000 diesel-electric locomotive. Despite the easternmost 363 km (226 mi) section of its route being electrified between Ankara and Eskişehir, the train would always make its entire journey with a diesel locomotive. While a standard consist would include a generator car, 4-5 coach cars, a dining car, and a sleeping car, extra coach cars and even extra sleeping car would be added, to accommodate extra demand.

== Schedule ==
Before the closure of the Basmane-Ulukent section of the route, the 9th of September Express would depart both Ankara and İzmir at 20:00, arriving shortly after 09:00 to their respective destinations. However, the train was prone to many delays due to the mostly single-track route as the train would regularly wait at stations for trains to pass in the opposite direction. This would cause delays, occasionally up to a few hours. Below is the timetable of the train from 2004.

9th of September Express, 2004 schedule
21035 (Ankara-İzmir)		9 Eylül Ekspresi	31035 (İzmir-Ankara)	
Arr	Dep	Stations	Arr	Dep
	20:00	Ankara	09:25	
20:19	20:20	Sincan	09:07	09:08
20:41	20:43	Temelli	-	-
21:00	21:01	Polatlı	08:27	08:28
22:34	22:44	Eskişehir	06:40	06:50
-	-	Sabuncupınar	05:54	05:56
-	-	Uluköy	05:44	05:45
23:47	23:49	Alayunt	05:31	05:32
00:00	00:03	Kütahya	05:17	05:20
00:35	00:36	Güzelyurt	-	-
00:52	00:54	Tavşanlı	04:27	04:28
01:22	01:23	Demirli	-	-
-	-	Değirmisaz	03:39	03:40
01:50	01:52	Balıköy	-	-
-	-	Gökçedağ	03:07	03:08
02:29	02:45	Piribeyler	02:44	02:46
03:17	03:18	Dursunbey	02:09	02:10
-	-	Selimağa	01:54	01:56
-	-	Gazellidere	01:40	01:41
-	-	Nusrat	00:49	00:50
04:51	05:01	Balıkesir	00:14	00:24
-	-	Çukurhüseyin	23:56	23:57
05:39	05:40	Soğucak	-	-
06:02	06:03	Savaştepe	23:09	23:10
06:28	06:30	Soma	22:39	22:41
07:05	07:07	Akhisar	22:01	22:03
07:49	07:51	Manisa	21:15	21:17
08:02	08:04	Muradiye	21:02	21:04
08:21	08:03	Emiralem	-	-
08:29	08:30	Menemen	20:38	20:39
08:48	08:50	Karşıyaka	20:16	20:18
09:06		Basmane		20:00

== Gallery ==
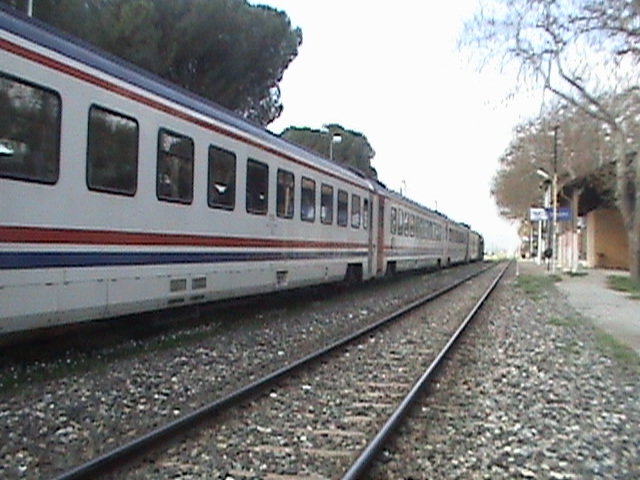
The westbound 9th of September Express waiting for a train to pass at Muradiye.

The destination board of the westbound train.

The destination board of the eastbound train.
