= Sultandağı railway station =

Sultandağı

General information
- Location: Sultandağı Cd., 03911; Sultandağı, Afyon; Turkey
- Coordinates: 37.547805°N 31.267986°E
- System: TCDD Taşımacılık intercity rail station
- Owner: Turkish State Railways
- Operator: TCDD Taşımacılık
- Line: Konya Blue Train
- Platforms: 1 island platform
- Tracks: 2
- Train operators: TCDD Taşımacılık

Construction
- Parking: Yes
- Cycle facilities: No
- Accessible: No

History
- Opened: 29 July 1896

Services
Preceding station	TCDD Taşımacılık	Following station
Çay towards İzmir (Basmane)	Konya Blue Train	Akşehir towards Konya
Location

Sultandağı railway station (Turkish: Büyükçobanlar istasyonu) is a railway station near Çobanlar, Turkey. TCDD Taşımacılık operates a daily inter-city train from İzmir to Konya which stops at the station at night. The station is located 3 km (1.9 mi) east of Sultandağı and is connected via the IL 03-28. Sultandağı station was opened in 1896 by the Anatolian Railway.
