= Akşehir railway station =

Akşehir
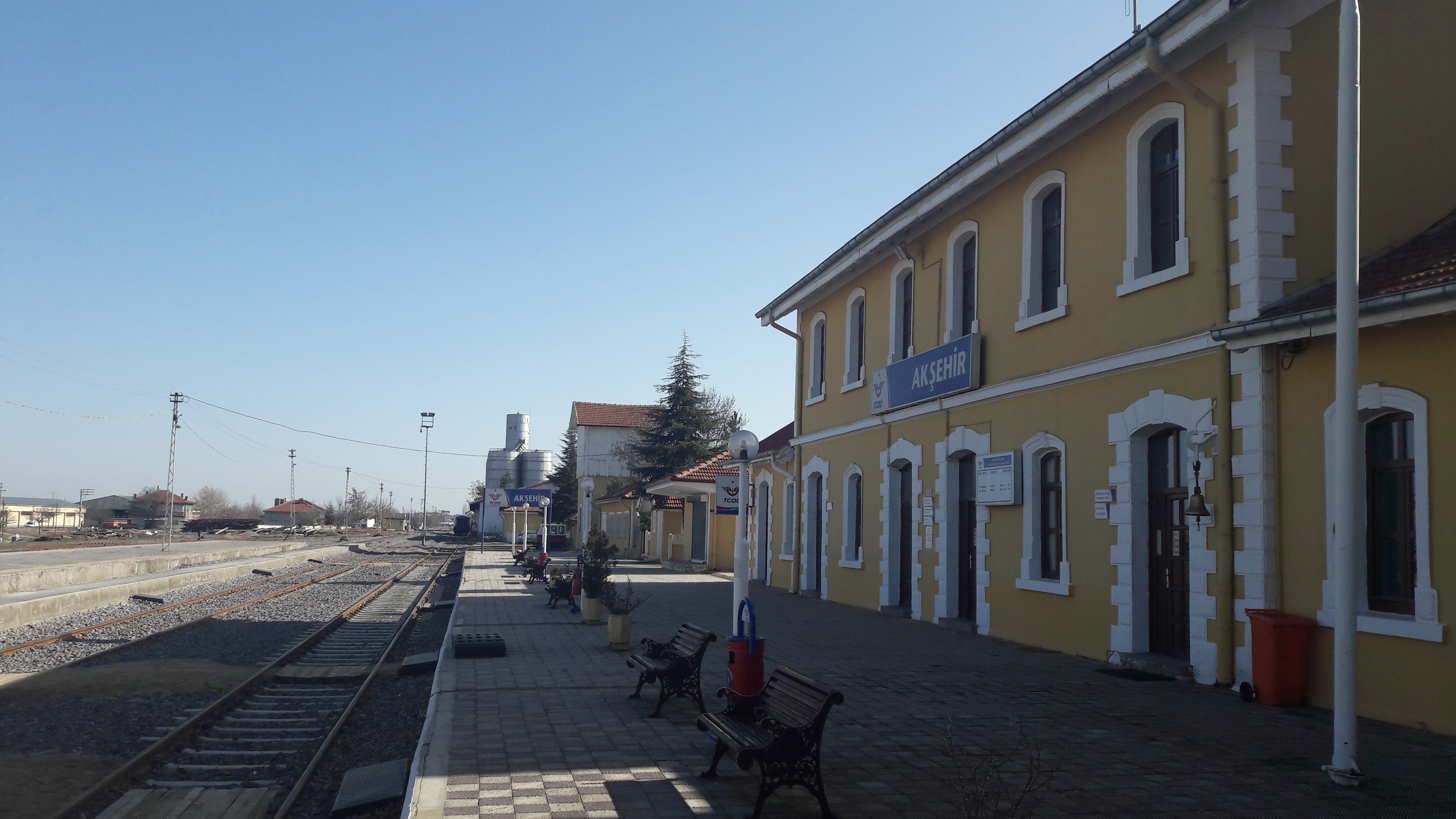
- Looking southeast (toward Konya) with the station building on the right.

General information
- Location: İstasyon Blv., İstasyon Mah., 42550; Akşehir, Konya; Turkey
- Coordinates: 37.2207°N 31.2636°E
- System: TCDD Taşımacılık intercity rail station
- Owner: Turkish State Railways
- Operator: TCDD Taşımacılık
- Line: Konya Blue Train
- Platforms: 2 (1 side platform, 1 island platform)
- Tracks: 2

Construction
- Parking: Yes
- Cycle facilities: No
- Accessible: No

History
- Opened: 29 July 1896

Services
Preceding station	TCDD Taşımacılık	Following station
Sultandağı towards İzmir (Basmane)	Konya Blue Train	Argıthanı towards Konya
Location

Akşehir station (Turkish: Akşehir istasyonu) is the railway station in the city of Akşehir, Turkey. It is in use since 1894.

Akşehir is an ilçe (district) in Konya Province. The station is to the north of Akşehir at 38°22′07″N 31°26′36″E. Its elevation is 997 metres (3,271 ft) The railroad lies parallel to the Turkish state road D.300.

The station was built in 1894 as the terminal of Afyon-Akşehir railroad during the Ottoman Empire era. Initially it was put into service by Anatolische Eisenbahngesellschaft – Chemins de Fer Ottomans d'Anatolie. On 29 July 1896 when the railroad was expanded, it became a mid station on 427 kilometres (265 mi) long Konya-Eskişehir railroad. Later in 1927, during the Turkish Republic era, it was acquired by Turkish State Railways.

== Trains ==
In addition to freight trains main services are

- Meram Ekspres ("Meram Express", Istanbul–Konya)
- Konya Mavi Tren ("Konya Blue Train", İzmir–Konya)
