= Menemen railway station =

Railway station in İzmir, Turkey

Menemen
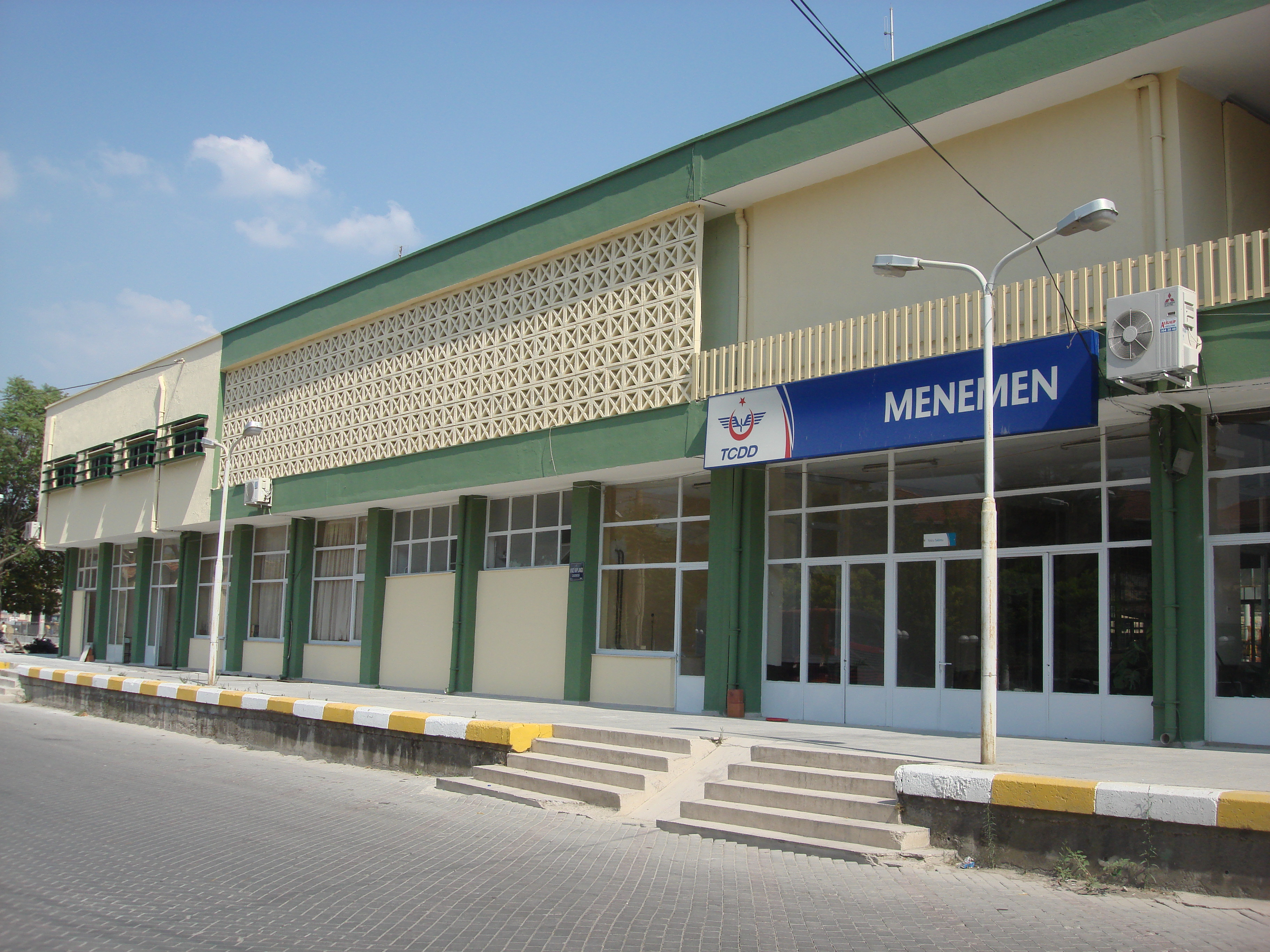
- The front of the station building.

General information
- Location: Niyazi Kaplangi Cd., Esatpaşa Mah. 35660; Menemen, İzmir; Turkey
- Coordinates: 38.6033°N 27.0764°E
- System: TCDD intercity and regional rail station İZBAN commuter rail station
- Owner: Turkish State Railways
- Operator: TCDD Taşımacılık; İZBAN A.Ş.
- Lines: İzmir-Afyon railway Menemen-Aliağa railway
- Platforms: 2 (1 side platform, 1 island platform)
- Tracks: 4
- Connections: ESHOT Bus: 747, 748, 749, 754, 755, 756, 800

Construction
- Structure type: At-grade
- Parking: Yes

History
- Opened: 10 October 1865; 160 years ago
- Electrified: 2001 (25 kV AC)

Passengers
- 2011: 1,044,191 (İZBAN)

Services
Preceding station	TCDD Taşımacılık	Following station
Çiğli towards İzmir (Basmane)	İzmir Blue Train	Muradiye towards Ankara
Çiğli towards İzmir (Basmane)	Aegean Express	Emiralem towards Eskişehir
Çiğli towards İzmir (Basmane)	6 Sep Express	Emiralem towards Bandırma
Çiğli towards İzmir (Basmane)	17 Sep Express	Emiralem towards Bandırma
Çiğli towards İzmir (Basmane)	Konya Blue Train	Emiralem towards Konya
Çiğli towards İzmir (Basmane)	İzmir–Alaşehir	Emiralem towards Alaşehir
Çiğli towards İzmir (Basmane)	İzmir-Uşak	Emiralem towards Uşak
Preceding station	İZBAN	Following station
Egekent 2 towards Cumaovası	Aliağa-Cumaovası	Hatundere towards Aliağa
Egekent 2 towards Tepeköy	Aliağa-Tepeköy (Late nights)	Hatundere towards Aliağa
Egekent 2 towards Tepeköy	Menemen-Tepeköy	Terminus

Future services
Preceding station	TCDD Taşımacılık	Following station
İzmir (Basmane) towards İzmir (Alsancak)	Yüksek Hızlı Tren	Manisa towards Ankara
Location

Menemen railway station (Turkish: Menemen garı) is a railway station at Menemen in İzmir Province, Turkey. The station is served by the Turkish State Railways, the national rail carrier of Turkey. The station is serviced by six trains daily. Northbound TCDD trains go to either Bandırma, Ankara, Afyon or Uşak and southbound TCDD trains all go to Basmane Terminal in İzmir. North of the station, the double track branch line to Aliağa splits from the main line. The original station was built in 1866 by the Smyrna Cassaba Railway. Menemen station also serves the İZBAN trains. There is a transfer from ESHOT buses.

== History ==
The station was opened in 1866, by the Smyrna Cassaba Railway (SCP). A passenger train from Basmane Terminal in İzmir served the station to Bandırma and Uşak, then Afyon. The Republic of Turkey was formed in 1923 and the Turkish State Railways (TCDD) were formed in 1927 to nationalize Turkey's railways. SCP was absorbed by TCDD on June 1, 1934. TCDD rebuilt the station and broadened the tracks in 1938. The line was made double track in 1975 and electrified with 25 kV AC overhead wire in 2002. From 2006 to 2010 the Basmane-Ulukent section of the line in İzmir was closed, due to the construction of the Karşıyaka Railway Tunnel. During this time the tracks in the station were used as a yard for passenger trains. When the line re-opened on May 19, 2010, the station was no longer used as a yard. The elevated platform section will be converted for use of the new İzmir Commuter Rail System (İZBAN).
