= Manisa railway station =

Railway station in Şehzadeler, Manisa, Turkey

MANİSA
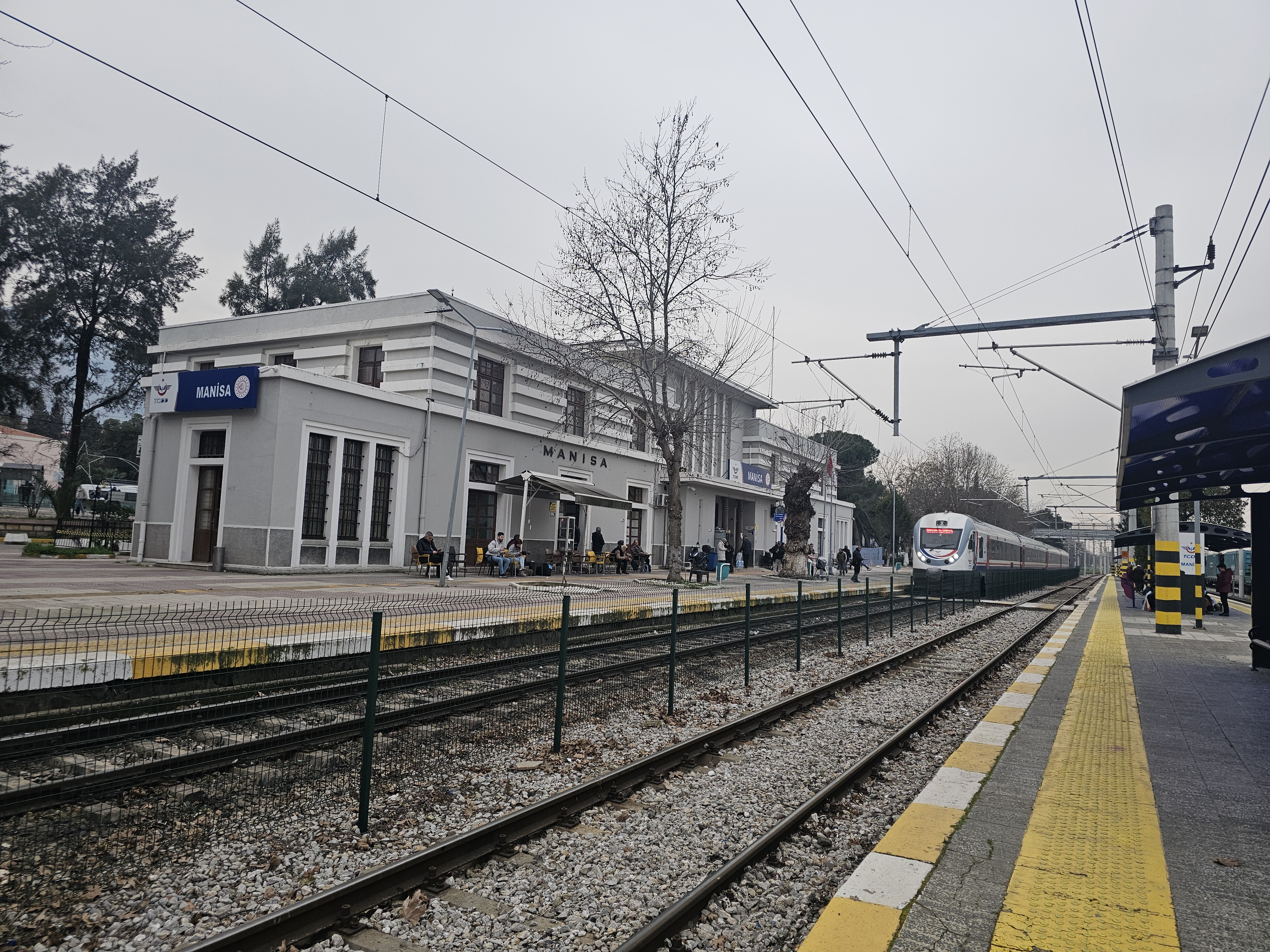
- The art-deco station building and a regional train waiting to depart track 1.

General information
- Location: Mehmetcik Cd., 2. Anafartalar Mah. 45020; Şehzadeler, Manisa; Turkey
- Coordinates: 38.6211°N 27.4356°E
- Elevation: 48 m (157 ft)
- System: TCDD Transport inter-city and regional rail station
- Owner: Turkish State Railways
- Operator: TCDD Transport
- Lines: İzmir-Afyon railway Manisa-Bandırma railway Ankara-İzmir high-speed railway (Future)
- Distance: 66 km (41 mi) (İzmir)
- Platforms: 2 (1 side platform, 1 island platform)
- Tracks: 3

Construction
- Structure type: At-grade
- Parking: No
- Accessible: Yes
- Architectural style: Art deco

Other information
- Status: In operation

History
- Opened: 10 October 1865
- Rebuilt: 1930s (Station building)
- Electrified: 25 August 2017; 25 kV AC, 50 Hz OHLE
Services
| Preceding station | TCDD Taşımacılık | Following station |
|---|---|---|
| Horozköy towards İzmir (Basmane) | Aegean Express | Karaağaçlı towards Eskişehir |
| Muradiye towards İzmir (Basmane) | 6 Sep Express | Saruhanlı towards Bandırma |
| Muradiye towards İzmir (Basmane) | 17 Sep Express | Saruhanlı towards Bandırma |
| Muradiye towards İzmir (Basmane) | İzmir Blue Train | Saruhanlı towards Ankara |
| Muradiye towards İzmir (Basmane) | Konya Blue Train | Turgutlu towards Konya |
| Horozköy towards İzmir (Basmane) | İzmir-Uşak | Çobanisa towards Uşak |
| Horozköy towards İzmir (Basmane) | İzmir–Alaşehir | Çobanisa towards Alaşehir |
| Terminus | Manisa–Alaşehir | Çobanisa towards Alaşehir |
Future services
| Preceding station | TCDD Taşımacılık | Following station |
|---|---|---|
| Menemen towards İzmir (Alsancak) | Yüksek Hızlı Tren | Turgutlu towards Ankara |
Location

Manisa railway station (Turkish: Manisa garı) is the main railway station in Manisa, Turkey. The station is owned by the Turkish State Railways and is serviced by intercity and regional trains operated by TCDD Transport. Originally opened in 1865 and located on the İzmir-Afyon railway, the station sits west of a junction where the Manisa-Bandırma railway diverges north.

Given its close proximity to İzmir, Manisa station sees intercity trains from İzmir to Ankara, Bandırma, Eskişehir and Konya along with regional trains from İzmir to Alaşehir and Uşak. Another regional train service from Manisa operates to Alaşehir as well.

== See also ==
- Sivas station
- Malatya station
- Diyarbakır station
