= Ulukent =

- Ulukent, Arhavi, a Turkish village in the Arhavi district of the Artvin Province
- Ulukent, Diyadin, a Turkish village in the Diyadin district of the Ağrı Province
- Ulukent, Kyrgyzstan, a Kyrgyzstani village in the Jalal-Abad Province
- Ulukent, Menemen, a Turkish village in the Menemen district of the İzmir Province
  - Ulukent (İZBAN), a train station in the previous village
- Ulukent, Tavas, a Turkish village in the Tavas district of the Denizli Province
  - Ulukent mine, a manganese mine near the previous village
