= Emirdağ YHT railway station =

EMİRDAĞ YHT

General information
- Location: Karağaç, 03602; Emirdağ/Afyon; Turkey
- Coordinates: 39.059444°N 31.179209°E
- System: TCDD high-speed rail station
- Owner: Turkish State Railways
- Line: Yüksek Hızlı Tren

History
- Opening: 2027 (planned)

Services
Preceding station	TCDD Taşımacılık	Following station
Future service
Afyon towards İzmir (Alsancak)	Yüksek Hızlı Tren	Polatlı YHT towards Ankara
Location

Emirdağ YHT station, short for Emirdağ Yüksek Hızlı Tren station (Turkish: Emirdağ Yüksek Hızlı Tren garı), is a planned railway station located north of Emirdağ, Turkey. The station will be located just east of the D.675 highway near the village of Karağaç, and will service high-speed trains along the Polatlı–Izmir high-speed railway.

The station will become the first railway station in Emirdağ once opened.
