= Büyükçobanlar railway station =

Railway station in Afyon, Turkey

Çobanlar

General information
- Location: İstasyon Mah., 03700; Çobanlar, Afyon; Turkey
- Coordinates: 38.6884°N 31.7389°E
- System: TCDD Taşımacılık intercity rail station
- Owner: Turkish State Railways
- Operator: TCDD Taşımacılık
- Platforms: 1 side platform
- Tracks: 1
- Train operators: TCDD Taşımacılık

Construction
- Parking: Yes
- Cycle facilities: No
- Accessible: No

Other information
- Status: In operation

History
- Opened: 1977
- Former names: Büyükçobanlar
Location

Çobanlar railway station (Turkish: Çobanlar Tren İstasyonu), formerly Büyükçobanlar railway station (Turkish: Büyükçobanlar Tren İstasyonu), is a railway station near Çobanlar, Turkey. TCDD Taşımacılık operates a daily inter-city train from İzmir to Konya which stops at the station at night. The station is located between two towns with the same name, Çobanlar. The larger of the two is located about 4 km (2.5 mi) northeast, while the smaller of the two is located directly south of the station.

Çobanlar station was opened in 1977 along with the Afyon Sugar Refinery.
