= Ulukent mine =

Manganese mine in Turkey

- Location: Denizli, Denizli Province, Turkey
- Products: Manganese
- Opened: 1973
- Company: Etibank

The Ulukent mine is a large mine in the west of Turkey in Denizli Province 405 km (252 mi) west of the capital, Ankara. Ulukent represents the largest manganese reserve in Turkey having estimated reserves of 2.5 million tonnes of manganese.
