= İzmir–Afyon railway =

Railway line in Turkey

İzmir–Afyon railway İzmir–Afyon demiryolu
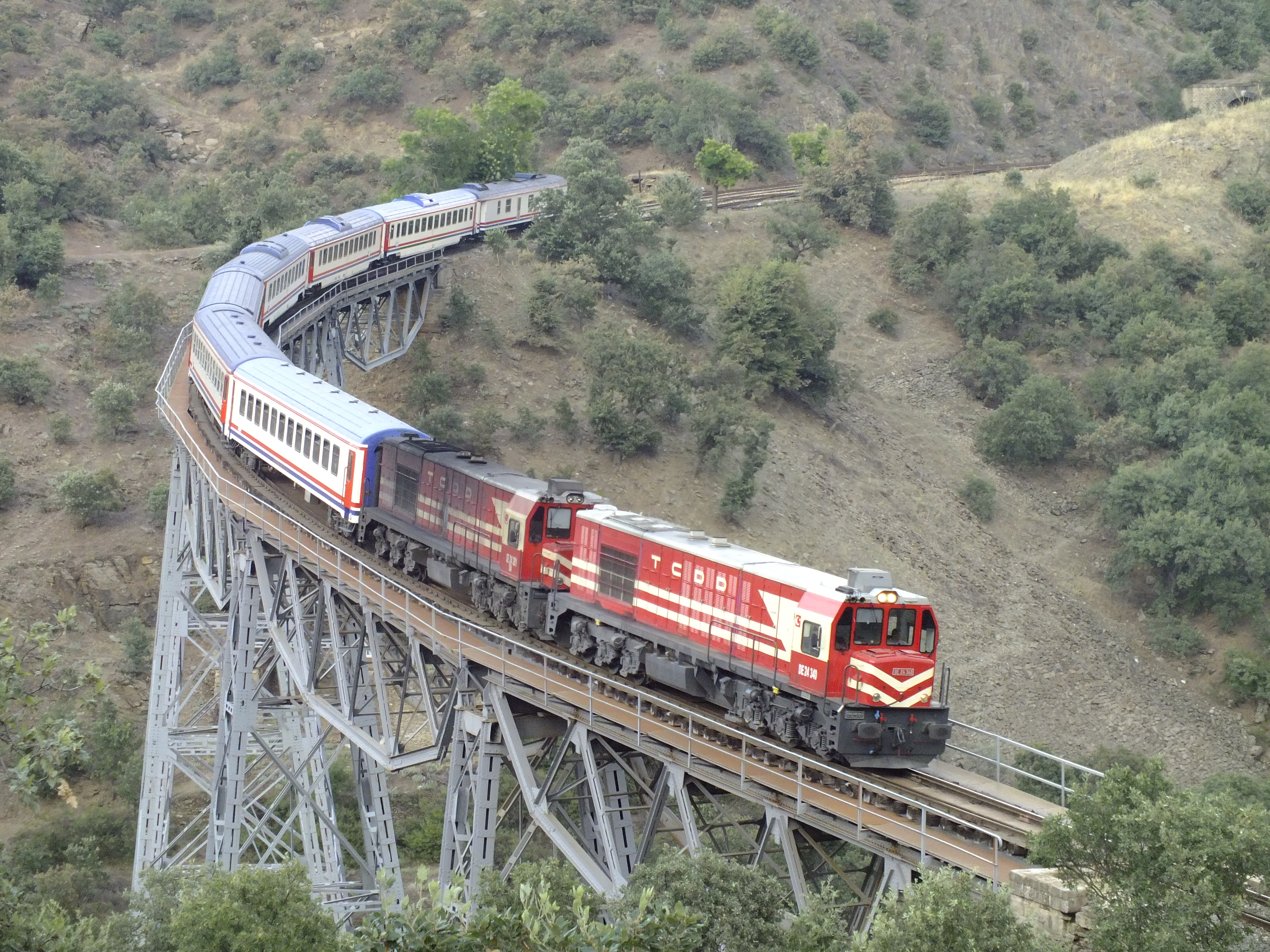
- A westbound regional train crossing Bridge 98.

Overview
- Owner: Turkish State Railways
- Locale: Aegean Region
- Termini: İzmir; Afyon

Service
- Type: Passenger and freight rail
- Operator(s): TCDD Transport (İzmir–Afyon); Omsan (Menemen–Afyon); İZBAN (İzmir–Menemen)

History
- Opened: 10 October 1865 (İzmir–Manisa); 1890 (İzmir–Afyon)

Technical
- Track gauge: 1,435 mm (4 ft 8 1/2 in) standard gauge
Route map
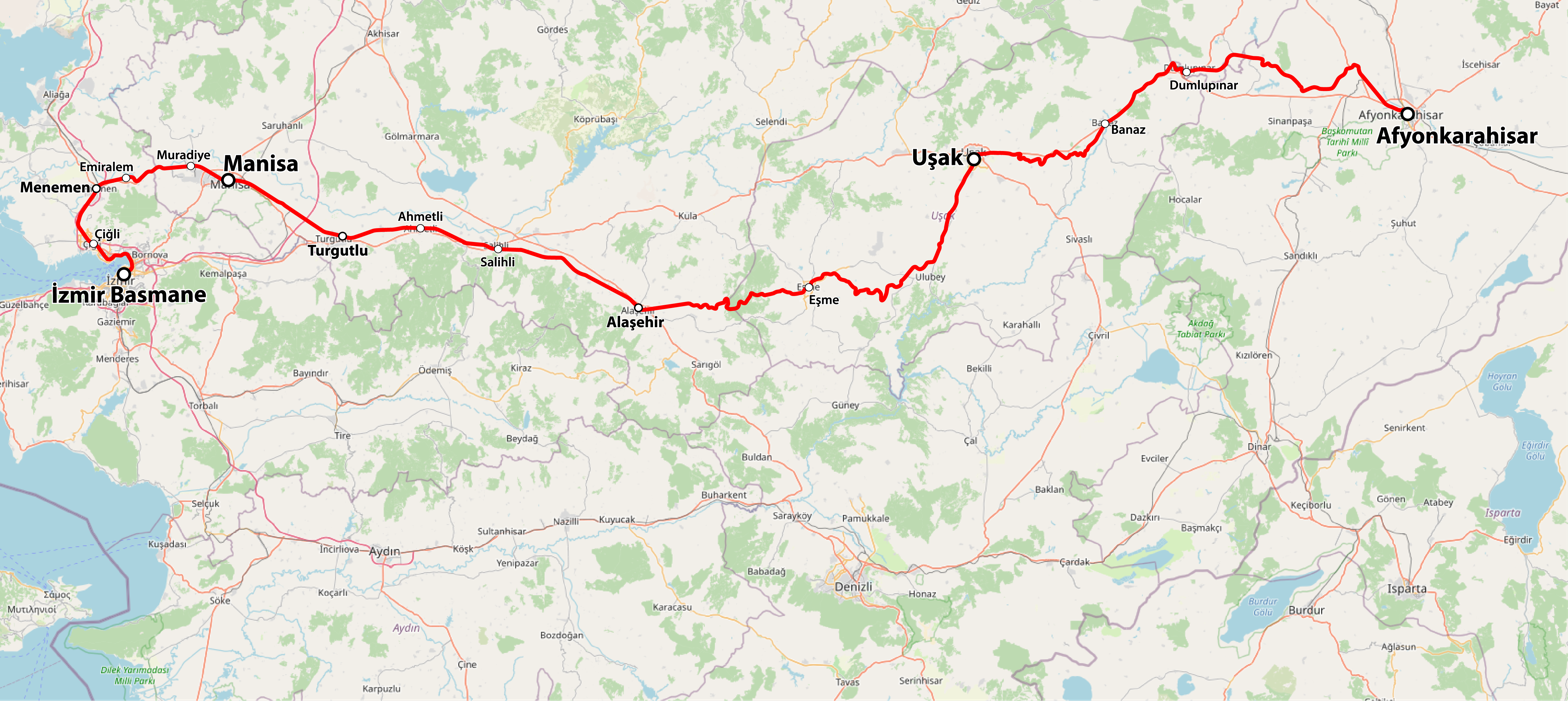
(Click to expand)

The İzmir–Afyon railway (Turkish: İzmir–Afyon demiryolu) is a mostly single-track railway in the Aegean Region of Turkey, connecting Afyonkarahisar to the port city of İzmir. The railway is the main freight and passenger train route from the Aegean region to Central Anatolia. It was built between 1865–90 by the Smyrna Cassaba Railway and is the second oldest railway in Turkey. Today the line is owned by the Turkish State Railways.

== Operations ==
TCDD Taşımacılık operates regional and inter-city passenger service from İzmir to Uşak and Afyon, and further to Konya. In İzmir, the railway hosts İZBAN commuter rail service from Tepeköy to Menemen, where the İZBAN branches off to Aliağa. TCDD Taşımacılık also operates frequent freight trains, mostly from the industrial Aliağa region into central Anatolia. Since 2018 Omsan operates bulk freight trains from the port of Aliağa to Kayseri, using the railway.

Train type	Route	Frequency	Operator
Mainline	İzmir – Menemen – Manisa – Alaşehir – Uşak – Afyon – Konya	Daily	TCDD Taşımacılık
Mainline	İzmir – Menemen – Manisa – Balıkesir – Kütahya – Eskişehir – Ankara	Daily	TCDD Taşımacılık
Mainline	İzmir – Menemen – Manisa – Balıkesir – Kütahya – Eskişehir	Daily	TCDD Taşımacılık
Regional	İzmir – Menemen – Manisa – Alaşehir – Uşak	2x Daily	TCDD Taşımacılık
Regional	İzmir – Menemen – Manisa – Alaşehir	Daily	TCDD Taşımacılık
Regional	Manisa – Alaşehir	Daily	TCDD Taşımacılık
Commuter	Tepeköy – Cumaovası – Şirinyer – Alsancak – Halkapınar – Karşıyaka – Çiğli – Menemen – Aliağa	5x Hourly	İZBAN
