= Uşak Express =

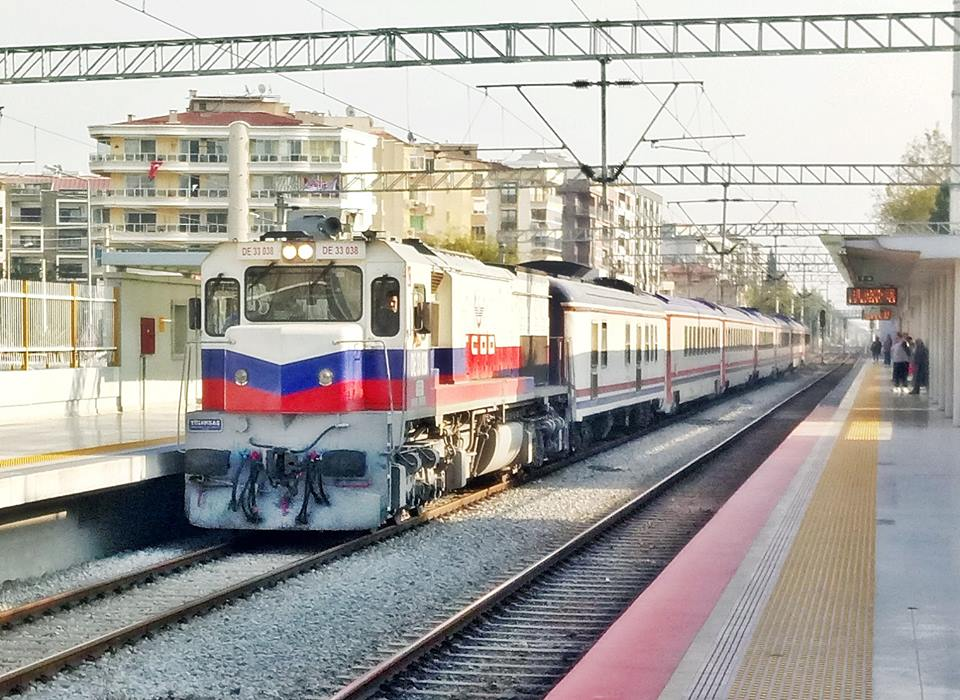
- A westbound train passing Şemikler station.

Overview
- Service type: Regional rail
- Status: Operating
- Locale: Western Anatolia
- Current operator: TCDD Taşımacılık

Route
- Termini: Basmane Terminal, İzmir; Uşak
- Distance travelled: 287 km (178 mi)
- Average journey time: About 6 hours
- Service frequency: Twice daily

On-board services
- Class: Unreserved
- Seating arrangements: Coach seating
- Catering facilities: Vendors

Technical
- Rolling stock: Diesel multiple unit
- Track gauge: 1,435 mm (4 ft 8 1/2 in)
- Track owner: Turkish State Railways

The Uşak Express (Turkish: Uşak Ekspresi) is a 287 km (178 mi) long regional passenger train operated by TCDD Taşımacılık, running from Basmane in İzmir to Uşak. It runs twice a day in each direction, taking about six hours.

== Route ==
The train runs on the İzmir–Afyon railway from Basmane in İzmir to Uşak, passing Manisa, Salihli, and Alaşehir stations on its way.

The government's 2025 list of public service obligation lines gives the route as Basmane–Manisa–Alaşehir–Uşak.

The Konya Blue Train also serves the İzmir–Uşak route and can be used as an alternative.

== Service ==
It runs two trains a day in each direction. Each journey takes about six hours. Seats cannot be reserved and tickets are sold only at station ticket offices on the day of travel. Tickets also carry no seat numbers, and passengers are allowed to stand.

TCDD sells tickets for its regional trains for up to five minutes before departure, and these trains have pullman seating.

Licensed vendors sell water, tea, coffee, and snacks on board the train on parts of the route, and only folding bicycles are allowed.

The train has no special accessibility features.

== Funding ==
Under Turkish regulations, passenger services on lines designated as a public service obligation, which operators cannot run on commercial terms, are paid for under contracts funded from the budget of the Ministry of Transport and Infrastructure. Basmane–Uşak has been among the regional lines designated as a public service obligation passenger service since at least December 2016. It was also on the lists issued in 2018, 2019, and 2020. In September 2026, Presidential Decision No. 11800, published in the Resmi Gazete, was issued under Article 8 of Law No. 6461, the Railway Transport Liberalization Law. It listed 47 lines designated as a public service obligation, including Basmane–Uşak among 34 regional lines.

== Rolling stock ==
The service uses diesel multiple units.
