= Uşak railway station =

Uşak
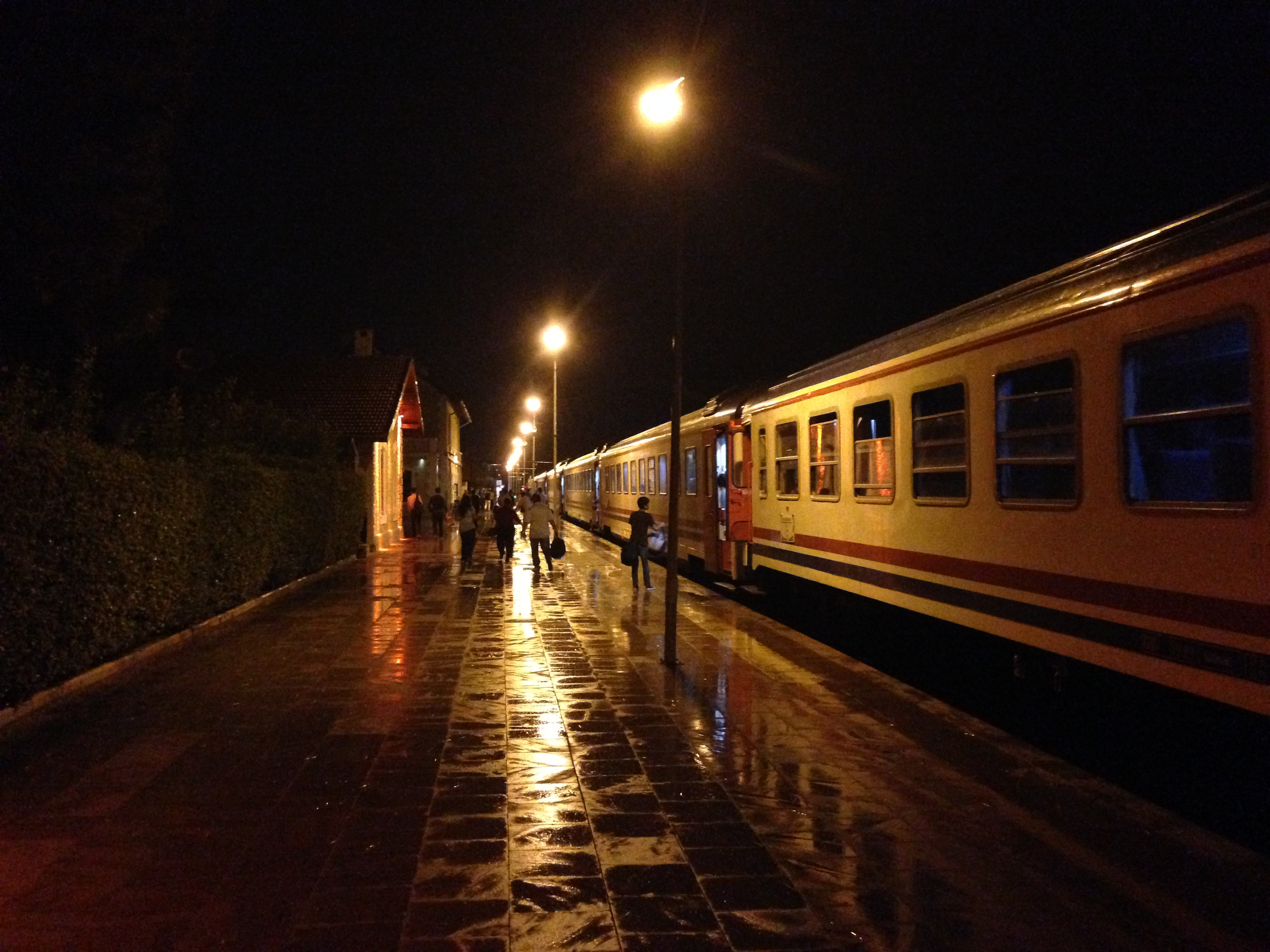
- Passengers disembarking a regional train from İzmir.

General information
- Location: B1. Ofis Sk. 29P, Fatih Mah. 64300; Uşak; Turkey
- Coordinates: 38.66404°N 29.40715°E
- System: TCDD Taşımacılık intercity and regional rail station
- Owner: Turkish State Railways
- Operator: TCDD Taşımacılık
- Line: Konya Blue Train İzmir-Uşak
- Platforms: 1 side platform
- Tracks: 5

Construction
- Parking: In front of station house
- Cycle facilities: No

History
- Opened: 20 December 1887

Services
Preceding station	TCDD Taşımacılık	Following station
İnay towards İzmir (Basmane)	Konya Blue Train	Banaz towards Konya
Ovaköy towards İzmir (Basmane)	İzmir-Uşak	Terminus
Future service
Salihli towards İzmir (Alsancak)	Yüksek Hızlı Tren	Afyon towards Ankara
Location

Uşak railway station (Turkish: Uşak garı) is a railway station in Uşak, Turkey and is the only station within the city. TCDD Taşımacılık operates a daily inter-city train from İzmir to Konya and a daily regional train to İzmir.

The station was originally built by the Smyrna Cassaba Railway in 1887 as part of their railway from Smyrna (modern-day İzmir) to Karahisar. Uşak station consists of a single side platform, serving one track. The four other tracks are used for storing passenger cars during layovers as well as freight cars.
