= İzmir–Alaşehir Regional =

Basmane-Alaşehir Regional
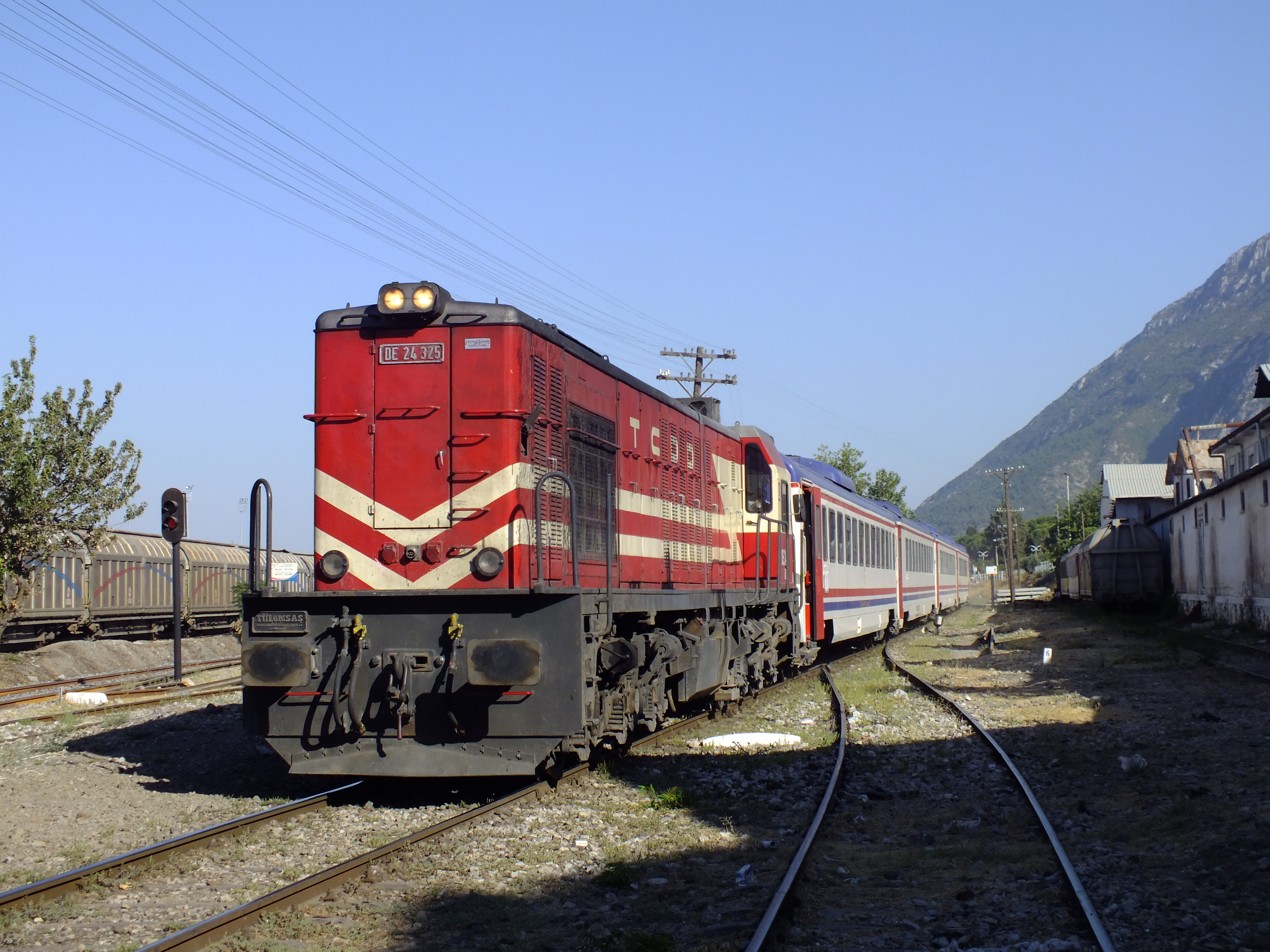

Overview
- Service type: Regional rail
- Status: Operating
- Locale: Western Anatolia
- Current operator(s): Turkish State Railways

Route
- Termini: Basmane Terminal, İzmir; Alaşehir
- Stops: 12
- Distance travelled: 168 km (104 mi)
- Average journey time: 3 hours, 02 minutes
- Service frequency: Daily

On-board services
- Class(es): Unreserved, unnumbered, classless
- Seating arrangements: Coach seating
- Catering facilities: no
- Entertainment facilities: TCDD promotional video loop is displayed in the in-train entertainment system
- Baggage facilities: 3 baggage racks per train

Technical
- Rolling stock: DM15400
- Track gauge: 1,435 mm (4 ft 8 1/2 in)
- Operating speed: 120 kilometres per hour (75 mph)
- Track owner(s): Turkish State Railways

The Basmane-Alaşehir Regional, numbered B36 (Turkish: Basmane-Alaşehir Bölgeseli), is a 168 km (104 mi) long regional passenger train operated by the Turkish State Railways, running from Basmane Terminal in İzmir to the town of Alaşehir. The train operates daily in each direction. Scheduled journey time is 3 hours and 2 minutes. In current operation practice, two trainsets each roundtrip between Alaşehir and Basmane and back, followed by one roundtrip between Alaşehir and Manisa and back, in a day.
