= Basmane railway station =

Railway station in İzmir, Turkey

Basmane
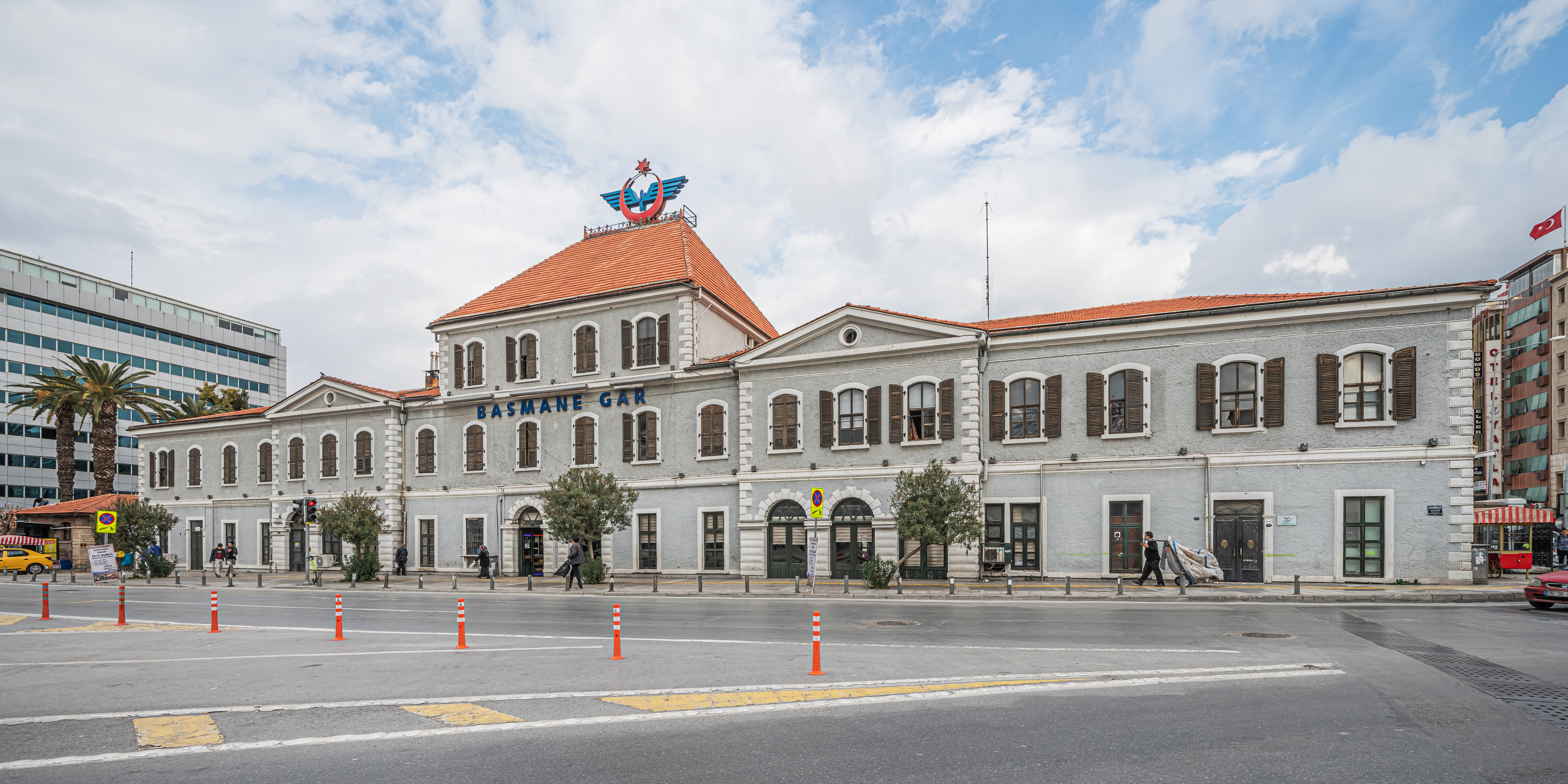
- Basmane station building

General information
- Location: Anafartalar Cd., Etiler Mah., 35210; Konak, İzmir; Turkey
- Coordinates: 38.2521°N 27.0837°E
- System: TCDD Taşımacılık intercity and regional rail station İzmir Metro rapid transit station
- Owner: Turkish State Railways
- Operator: TCDD Taşımacılık; İzmir Metro
- Line: İzmir-Afyon railway
- Platforms: 4 (1 side platform, 3 island platforms) (at-grade); 1 island platform (underground)
- Tracks: 7 (at-grade); 2 (underground)
- Connections: ESHOT Bus: 34, 35, 39, 42, 44, 45, 46, 302, 466, 838

Construction
- Structure type: At-grade (national railways); NATM bore (underground)
- Parking: No
- Cycle facilities: No
- Accessible: Yes

History
- Opened: 25 October 1866; 160 years ago as Basma Hane
- Electrified: 1999 (750 V DC third rail, bottom contact); 2001 (25 kV AC OHLE)

Services
Preceding station	TCDD Taşımacılık	Following station
Terminus	İzmir Blue Train	Çiğli towards Ankara
Terminus	Aegean Express	Çiğli towards Eskişehir
Terminus	6 Sep Express	Çiğli towards Bandırma
Terminus	17 Sep Express	Çiğli towards Bandırma
Terminus	Konya Blue Train	Çiğli towards Konya
Terminus	İzmir-Uşak	Çiğli towards Uşak
Terminus	İzmir–Alaşehir	Çiğli towards Alaşehir
Terminus	Göller Express	Gaziemir towards Isparta
Terminus	Güller Express	Gaziemir towards Isparta
Terminus	İzmir–Denizli	Gaziemir towards Denizli
Terminus	İzmir–Nazilli	Gaziemir towards Nazilli
Terminus	İzmir–Ödemiş	Gaziemir towards Ödemiş Şehir
Terminus	İzmir–Tire	Gaziemir towards Tire
Preceding station	İzmir Metro	Following station
Çankaya towards Narlıdere Kaymakamlık	M1	Hilal towards Evka 3
Former/Future services
Preceding station	TCDD Taşımacılık	Following station
Future service
Terminus	Yüksek Hızlı Tren	Menemen towards Ankara
Preceding station	Turkish State Railways	Following station
Former service
Terminus	9 Sep Express	Karşıyaka towards Ankara
Terminus	Karesi Express	Çiğli towards Balıkesir
Terminus	Çiğli suburban	Hilal towards Çiğli
Terminus	Bornova suburban	Hilal towards Ege Üniversitesi
Terminus	Buca suburban	Kemer towards Buca
Location

Basmane railway station (Turkish: Basmane Garı) is an intercity and regional railway terminal and rapid transit station in İzmir, Turkey. Along with Alsancak station, Basmane is one of two railway terminals in the city. All TCDD Taşımacılık trains terminate at this station, with intercity service to Ankara, Bandırma and Konya as well as regional service to Denizli, Söke, Tire and Ödemiş. The name originated from the Turkish phrase Basma hane.

== History ==
=== National railway station ===
When the Ottoman Railway Company built Alsancak Terminal, the demand for more railways in İzmir grew. On July 4, 1863, the Smyrna Cassaba Railway (SCR) was chartered to build a line from İzmir to Turgutlu (then Cassaba). The railway chose to have their terminal close to the city center. Construction of the station began in 1864 and completed in 1866. The station opened on October 25, 1866. The SCR used the station for passenger and freight operations, with a freight depot in the back of the station. During World War I, the station along with the railway was put under Ottoman military control. After the war and the Republic of Turkey formed, the station was still under SCR control until 1934, when the Turkish State Railways (TCDD) absorbed the SCR. TCDD continues to operate the station to the present. In 2001 the tracks were electrified, but never used. In 2006 the station was renovated and closed to passenger service. In 2009 passenger service returned.

=== Underground station ===
Underground station is on the M1 Line of the İzmir Metro in Konak. Located directly under the national railway station, it is one of the ten original stations of the metro system. Connection to TCDD Taşımacılık inter-city and regional trains are available above ground as well as ESHOT city bus service. Basmane is the only station offering a direct connection to intercity and regional train service on the metro system since 2016, when TCDD Taşımacılık trains bypassed Halkapınar. The station is constructed in a way all entrance and exit is done through national railway station above.

Basmane station was opened on 22 May 2000.

== Connections ==
ESHOT operates city bus service on Gazi Avenue and Fevzipaşa Avenue.

ESHOT bus service on Gazi Avenue
Route number	Stop	Route
35	Çardak	Ballıkuyu — Konak
302	Çardak	Otogar — Konak
466	Çardak	Şirinyer — Konak (via Gürçeşme)
951	Çardak	Montrö — Konak

ESHOT bus service on Fevzipaşa Avenue
Route number	Stop	Route
34	PTT	Esentepe — Gümrük
35	PTT	Ballıkuyu — Konak
36	PTT	Yeşildere — Gümrük
39	PTT	İsmetpaşa — Gümrük
466	PTT	Şirinyer — Konak (via Gürçeşme)
838	PTT	Şirinyer — Gümrük (via Mehtap)

== Nearby places of interest ==
- Kültürpark

== See also ==
- Basmane Metro Station
- İzmir Metro
- İZBAN
- Rail transport in İzmir
