= Konya Blue Train =

Turkish intercity train

Konya Blue Train Konya Mavi Treni
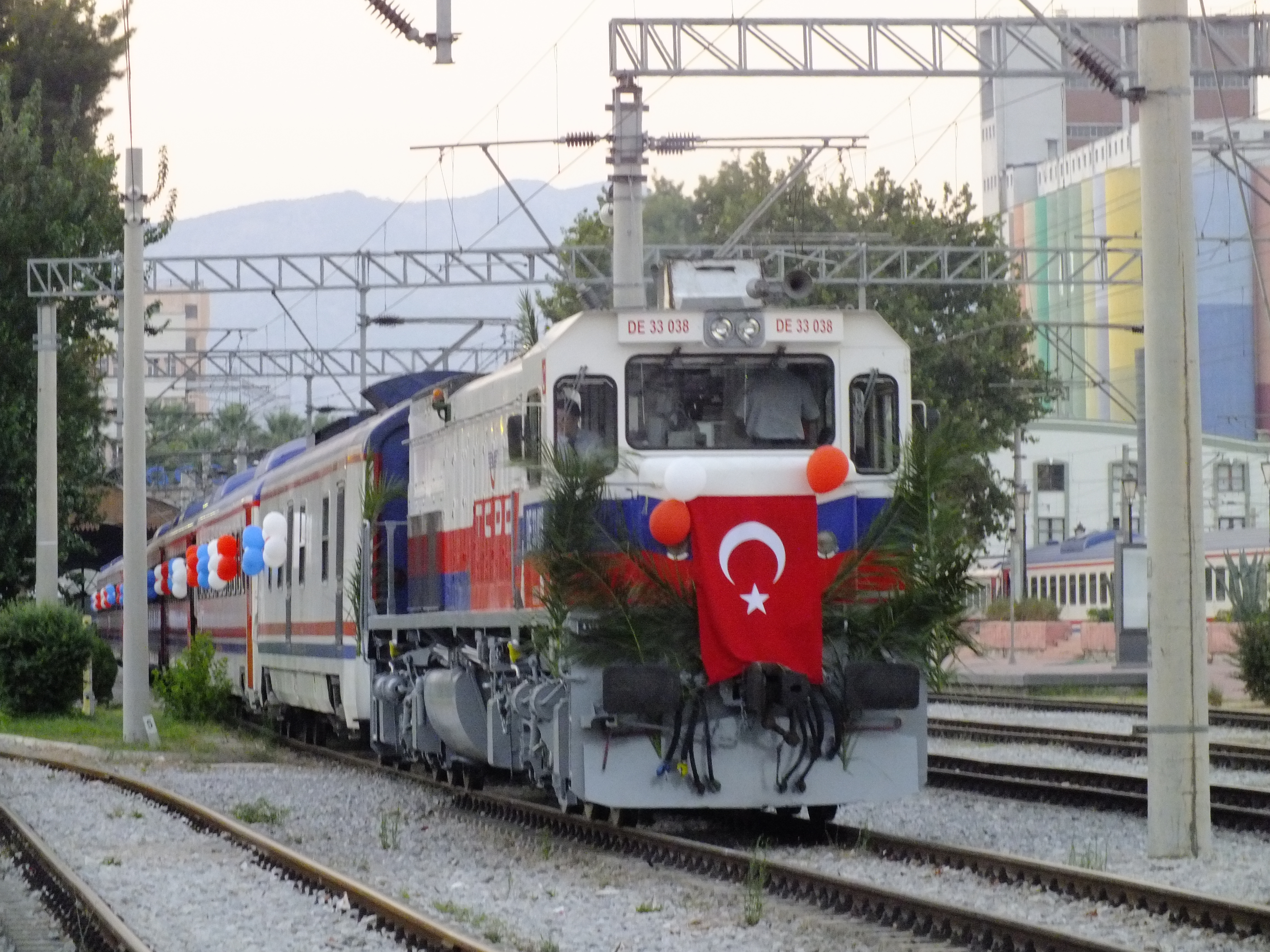
- The train on its inaugural run just after departing Alsancak.

Overview
- Service type: Intercity rail
- Locale: Western Turkey
- First service: 16 August 2012
- Current operator: TCDD Taşımacılık
- Former operator: Turkish State Railways

Route
- Termini: Basmane Terminal, İzmir; Konya
- Distance travelled: 693 km (431 mi)
- Service frequency: Daily each way

On-board services
- Classes: 1st class coach 1st class sleeper
- Disabled access: Limited
- Seating arrangements: Coach Seating
- Sleeping arrangements: Sleeping Car
- Catering facilities: Dining Car

Technical
- Rolling stock: TVS2000
- Track gauge: 1,435 mm (4 ft 8 1/2 in)
- Operating speed: 110 km/h (68 mph)
- Track owner: TCDD

The Konya Blue Train (Turkish: Konya Mavi Treni), previously referred to as the Mevlana Express is an overnight intercity train operating between İzmir and Konya since 16 August 2012. The inaugural train will departed Alsancak Terminal in İzmir at 8:00pm (EEST) after an opening ceremony which the minister of transport, Binali Yıldırım will attend. The train follows the former Smyrna Cassaba Railway's mainline to Afyon passing through Manisa, Alaşehir, Uşak, Afyon and Konya. The Konya Blue Train is the first train service to operate east of Uşak, to Afyon, since the cancellation of the İzmir-Diyarbakır Postal Train several years ago.

== Consists ==
- DE 22 000, (Note: Sometimes DE 33 000 may be used instead.) Head End Power Car, Coach, Coach, Coach, Coach, Diner, sleeper
