= List of İZBAN stations =

İZBAN is a commuter rail system serving İzmir, Turkey. It has forty-one stations.

== Stations ==
Station	Image	Line(s)	District	Type	Date opened	Connections
Adnan Menderes Havalimanı (Airport)		İZBAN Line	Gaziemir	At-grade	August 30, 2010	Airport, Buses, Trains
Alaybey		İZBAN Line	Karşıyaka	Underground	December 5, 2010	T1 Tram Line
Aliağa		İZBAN Line	Aliağa	At-grade	January 30, 2011	Buses
Alsancak		İZBAN Line	Konak	At-grade	August 30, 2010	Buses, T2 Tram Line
Ata Sanayi		İZBAN Line	Çiğli	At-grade	January 30, 2011	–
Bayraklı		İZBAN Line	Bayraklı	At-grade	December 5, 2010	Buses
Belevi		İZBAN Selçuk Line	Selçuk	At-grade	April 8, 2019	Buses
Biçerova		İZBAN Line	Aliağa	At-grade	January 30, 2011	Buses
Cumaovası		İZBAN Line	Menderes	At-grade	August 30, 2010	Buses, Trains
Çiğli		İZBAN Line	Çiğli	At-grade	December 5, 2010	Buses, Trams, Trains
Demirköprü		İZBAN Line	Karşıyaka	At-grade	December 5, 2010	–
Develi		İZBAN Line	Menderes	At-grade	February 6, 2016	–
Egekent		İZBAN Line	Çiğli	At-grade	January 30, 2011	Buses
Egekent 2		İZBAN Line	Menemen	At-grade	January 30, 2011	–
Esbaş		İZBAN Line	Gaziemir	At-grade	August 30, 2010	Buses
Gaziemir		İZBAN Line	Gaziemir	At-grade	August 30, 2010	Buses, Trains
Halkapınar		İZBAN Line	Konak	At-grade	August 30, 2010	M1 Metro Line, Buses, T2 Tram Line
Hatundere		İZBAN Line	Menemen	At-grade	January 30, 2011	Buses
Hilal		İZBAN Line	Konak	At-grade	August 4, 2013	M1 Metro Line
İnkılap		İZBAN Line	Buca	At-grade	August 30, 2010	Buses
Karşıyaka		İZBAN Line	Karşıyaka	Underground	December 5, 2010	–
Kemer		İZBAN Line	Konak	At-grade	August 30, 2010	Buses
Koşu		İZBAN Line	Buca	At-grade	August 30, 2010	Buses
Kuşçuburun		İZBAN Line	Torbalı	At-grade	February 6, 2016	Buses
Mavişehir		İZBAN Line	Karşıyaka	At-grade	December 5, 2010	Buses
Menemen		İZBAN Line	Menemen	At-grade	January 30, 2011	Buses, Trains
Naldöken		İZBAN Line	Karşıyaka	At-grade	December 5, 2010	–
Nergiz		İZBAN Line	Karşıyaka	Underground	December 5, 2010	–
Pancar		İZBAN Line	Torbalı	At-grade	February 6, 2016	Buses, Trains
Sağlık		İZBAN Selçuk Line	Torbalı	At-grade	September 8, 2017	Buses, Trains
Salhane		İZBAN Line	Bayraklı	At-grade	December 5, 2010	Buses
Sarnıç		İZBAN Line	Gaziemir	At-grade	August 30, 2010	Buses
Selçuk		İZBAN Selçuk Line	Selçuk	At-grade	September 8, 2017	Trains
Semt Garajı		İZBAN Line	Gaziemir	At-grade	August 30, 2010	Buses
Şemikler		İZBAN Line	Karşıyaka	At-grade	December 5, 2010	–
Şirinyer		İZBAN Line	Buca	Underground	August 30, 2010	Buses
Tekeli		İZBAN Line	Menderes	At-grade	February 6, 2016	Buses
Tepeköy		İZBAN Line	Torbalı	At-grade	February 6, 2016	Buses, Trains
Torbalı		İZBAN Line	Torbalı	At-grade	February 6, 2016	Buses, Trains
Turan		İZBAN Line	Bayraklı	At-grade	December 5, 2010	Buses
Ulukent		İZBAN Line	Menemen	At-grade	January 30, 2011	Buses

=== Future stations ===
Station	Line(s)	District	Type
Aliağa OSB	İZBAN Bergama Line	Aliağa	At-grade
Bergama	İZBAN Bergama Line	Bergama	At-grade
Bergama Otogar	İZBAN Bergama Line	Bergama	At-grade
Bozköy	İZBAN Bergama Line	Bergama	At-grade
Gürçeşme	İZBAN Line	Konak	At-grade
Katip Çelebi	İZBAN Line	Çiğli	At-grade
Yenikent	İZBAN Bergama Line	Bergama	At-grade
Yenişakran	İZBAN Bergama Line	Aliağa	At-grade
Zeytindağ	İZBAN Bergama Line	Bergama	At-grade
