= Hatundere railway station =

Railway station in İzmir, Turkey

Hatundere
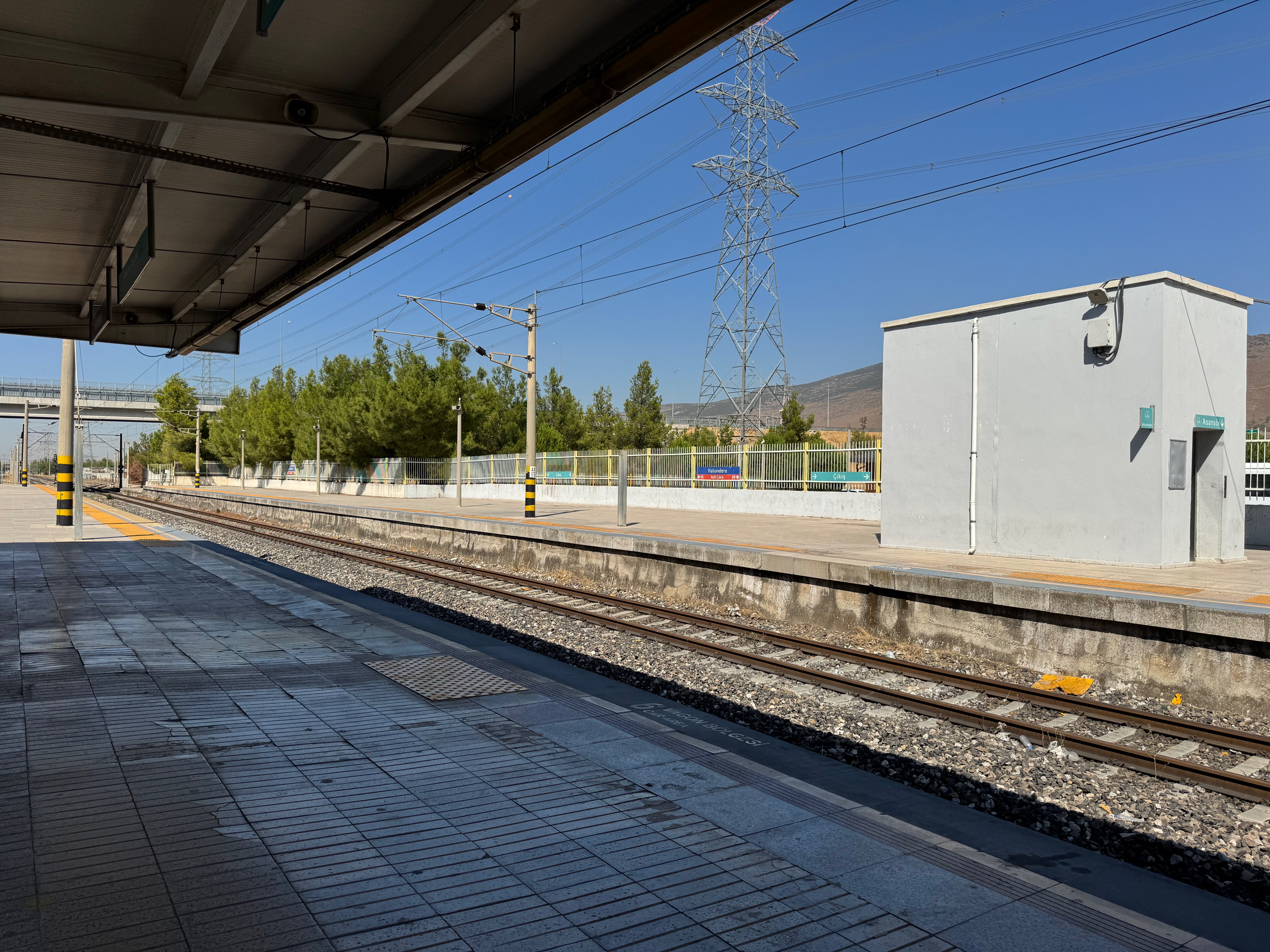

General information
- Location: Hatundere istayonu, 35660; Menemen; Turkey
- Coordinates: 38.6899°N 27.0176°E
- Elevation: 32 m (105 ft)
- System: İZBAN commuter rail station
- Owner: Turkish State Railways
- Operator: İZBAN
- Line: Menemen-Aliağa railway
- Distance: 13.5 km (8.4 mi) (Aliağa); 98.1 km (61.0 mi) (Tepeköy)
- Platforms: 2 side platforms
- Tracks: 2
- Connections: ESHOT: 744, 752

Construction
- Structure type: At-grade
- Parking: No
- Accessible: Yes

Other information
- Status: In operation

History
- Opened: 1995
- Closed: 2006-11
- Electrified: 2004 (25 kV AC, 60 Hz)
Services
| Preceding station | İZBAN | Following station |
|---|---|---|
| Menemen towards Cumaovası | Aliağa-Cumaovası | Biçerova towards Aliağa |
| Menemen towards Tepeköy | Aliağa-Tepeköy (Late nights) | Biçerova towards Aliağa |
Location

Hatundere railway station (Turkish: Hatundere istasyonu) is a railway station on the İZBAN commuter rail system. It is located near the villages Fatih, Helvacı and Hatundere and accessible via an unnamed service road.

== History ==
Hatundere station was originally opened in 1995 by the Turkish State Railways, along with the double-track Menemen-Aliağa railway. Hatundere was one of four stations built on the railway, along with Aliağa, Biçerova and Yanıkköy, and was built as a high-level station. With its completion, TCDD operated a regional trains service between Aliağa and Çiğli station in İzmir, where connections to local train service to Alsancak station could be made. In 1999 the State Railways and the İzmir Metropolitan Municipality unveiled plans for the Aliağa-Menderes railway corridor, which planned for a complete overhaul of the railway from Aliağa to Menderes, which would later be known as İZBAN. This included the electrification and modernization of all stations. Electrification work began on 18 December 1998 and was completed on 6 May 2004, although no electric trains were put into service. TCDD continued to operate regional railbus train service until 2006, when the construction of the Karşıyaka railway tunnel saw the closure of the railway between Çiğli and Basmane/Alsancak. While efforts were made to continue train service between Aliağa and Çiğli, these ultimately failed and Hatundere station was temporarily closed to passenger service. During its closure, certain upgrades to station were made, including the addition of turnstiles and PIS boards along with İZBAN signage. On 29 October 2010, İZBAN began testing its trains between Halkapınar and Aliağa with its new E22000 EMUs. On 30 January 2011, Hatundere reopened to passenger service with the extension of İZBAN's northern line from Çiğli to Aliağa. Hatundere originally saw hourly train service between Aliağa and Alsancak. This frequency increased to half-hourly on 15 May 2011, due to high demand.

== Service ==
Hatundere is located within İZBAN's Northern Line (Menemen-Aliağa) and therefore sees less-frequent train service compared to the Central Line (Menemen-Cumaovaı). İZBAN operates trains with a 24-minute window to Aliağa in the north and to Alsancak and Cumaovası in the south, along with three direct trains further south to Tepeköy at night. In cooperation with ESHOT bus service, Hatundere is the transfer point for service to Foça, via the 744 bus route. A second bus route to Buruncuk, on the D.550 highway also runs from the station. This transfer point between İZBAN trains and ESHOT busses is known as Hatundere Transfer Center (Turkish: Hatundere aktarma merkezi).

== Connections ==
ESHOT operates regional bus service, accessible from the station.

ESHOT Bus service
| Route number | Stop | Route | Location |
|---|---|---|---|
| 744 | Hatundere İstasyon | Hatundere Aktarma Merkezi — Foça | Hatundere Station |
| 752 | Hatundere İstasyon | Hatundere Aktarma Merkezi — Buruncuk | Hatundere Station |
