= Alaybey railway station =

Railway station in Karşıyaka, İzmir, Turkey

Alaybey
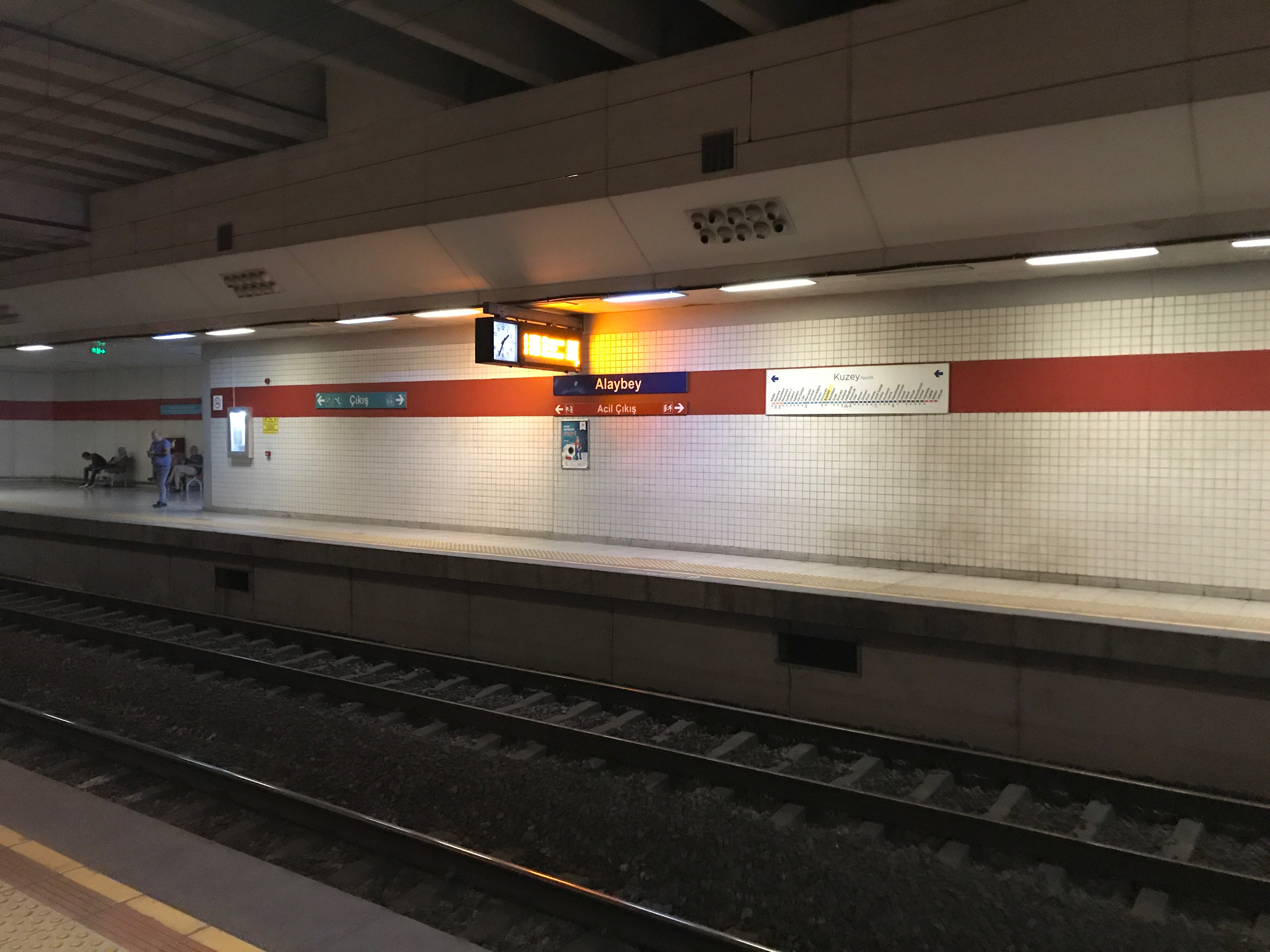

General information
- Coordinates: 38.4606°N 27.1214°E
- System: İZBAN commuter rail station
- Owner: Turkish State Railways
- Operator: TCDD Transport; İZBAN A.Ş.
- Line: İZBAN Line
- Platforms: 2 side platforms
- Tracks: 2
- Connections: T1 Karşıyaka Tram at Alaybey tram station

Construction
- Structure type: Underground
- Parking: No
- Accessible: Yes

History
- Opened: December 5, 2010
- Electrified: 2010

Services
Preceding station	İZBAN	Following station
Naldöken towards Cumaovası	Aliağa-Cumaovası	Karşıyaka towards Aliağa
Naldöken towards Tepeköy	Menemen-Tepeköy	Karşıyaka towards Menemen
Naldöken towards Tepeköy	Aliağa-Tepeköy (Late nights)	Karşıyaka towards Aliağa
Former services
Preceding station	Turkish State Railways	Following station
Karşıyaka towards İzmir (Basmane)	Çiğli suburban	Naldöken towards Çiğli
Location

Alaybey railway station is a railway station on the İZBAN commuter rail system in İzmir. Alaybey is one of the four underground stations in the entire İZBAN line. The original station was built in 2001 and was served by the Basmane-Aliağa Regional Line and the Alsancak-Çiğli Commuter Line. The station was closed in 2006 and moved underground as part of the Karşıyaka tunnel. Alaybey was reopened on December 5, 2010.

There is a transfer from the station to the T1 Tram Line. (approx. 490 m walking distance)
