= Ulukent railway station =

Railway station in Menemen, İzmir, Turkey

Ulukent
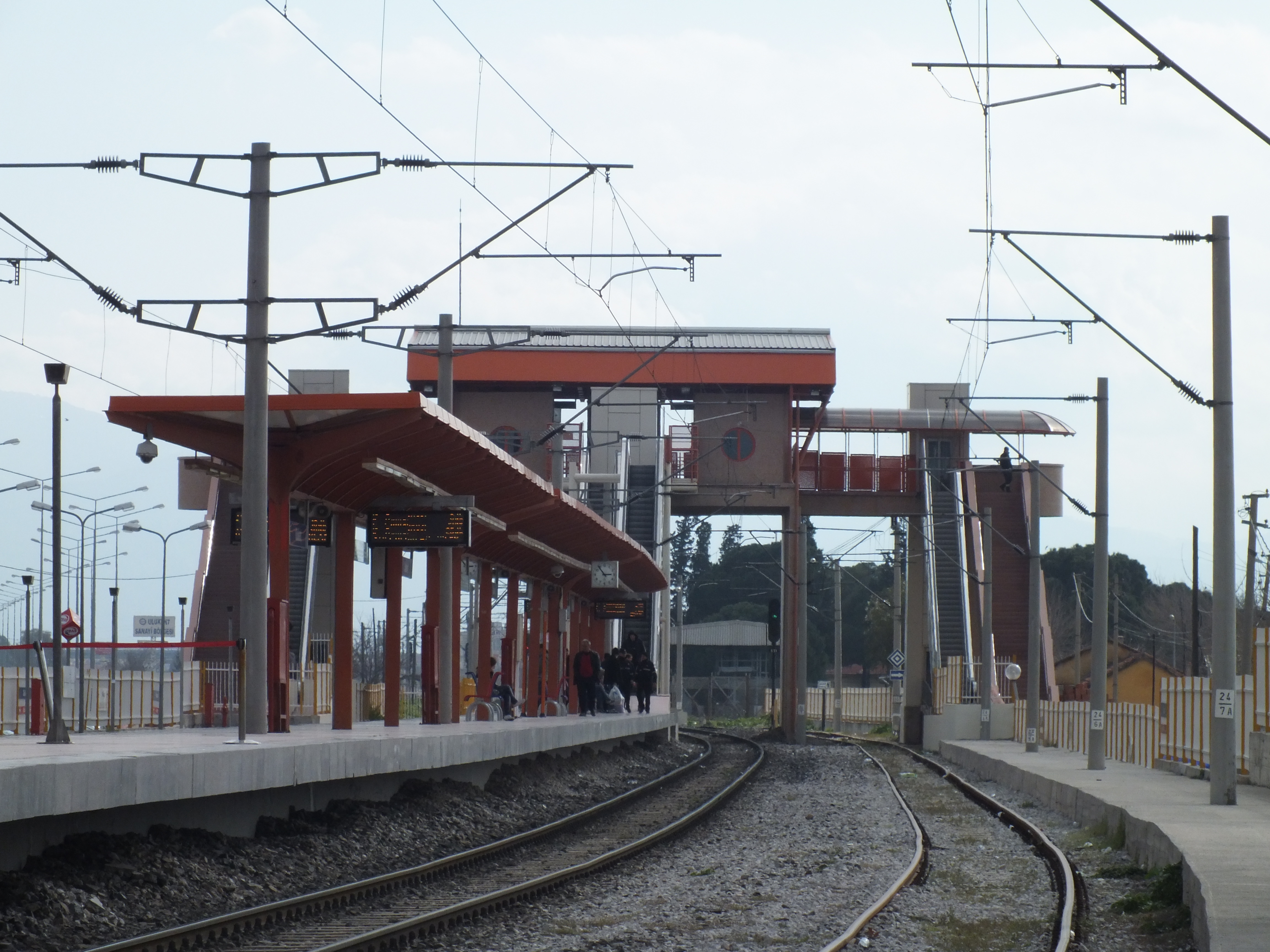
- Looking south towards the station.

General information
- Location: State highway D.550, 29 Ekim Mah., 35663; Menemen, İzmir; Turkey
- System: İZBAN commuter rail station
- Owner: Turkish State Railways
- Operator: İZBAN A.Ş.
- Line: İzmir-Afyon railway
- Platforms: 3 (2 side platforms, 1 island platform)
- Tracks: 3
- Connections: ESHOT Bus: Ulukent Aktarma: 619, 750, 757, 812, 850; Ulukent Gar: 128, 428, 602, 660, 695, 749, 800, 826, 827

Construction
- Structure type: At-grade
- Parking: Yes, eastern side of the station.
- Accessible: Yes

History
- Opened: 10 October 1865
- Electrified: 2002 (25 kV AC)

Services
Preceding station	İZBAN	Following station
Egekent towards Cumaovası	Aliağa-Cumaovası	Egekent 2 towards Aliağa
Egekent towards Tepeköy	Aliağa-Tepeköy (Late nights)	Egekent 2 towards Aliağa
Egekent towards Tepeköy	Menemen-Tepeköy	Egekent 2 towards Menemen
Location

Ulukent is a railway station on the İzmir-Afyon railway, in Menemen, İzmir. Located along the D.550 highway, it is a station on the İZBAN commuter rail system. The station is within the Central line of the İZBAN network, with trains running north to Menemen and Aliağa; and south to Alsancak, Cumaovası and Tepeköy.

== History ==
Ulukent station was originally opened on 10 October 1865, by the Smyrna Cassaba Railway, with the opening of their railway from Basmane to Manisa. In 1934, the Turkish State Railways bought the railway, as part of the government's nationalization program. A second-track was added to Ulukent in 1995, when TCDD extended its double-track section from Çiğli to Menemen to connect to the newly built Menemen-Aliağa railway. Ulukent remained as a stop on the line until 1999, when plans to expand the station as part of the new Aliağa-Menderes railway corridor were put forward. The station was electrified in 2002 and an island platform and overpass was completed in 2004. The station was then serviced by regional and some intercity trains to Aliağa, Uşak, Afyonkarahisar, Bandırma and Ankara.

Ulukent became the northern rail head in İzmir in 2008, due to the construction of the Karșıyaka railway tunnel. Train service from Basmane station was originally truncated back to Çiğli on 25 February 2006 and in 2008 truncated further north to Ulukent. During this period, all trains on the railway terminated at the station, with TCDD offering express bus service to stations within İzmir. During this period, a second platform was added to service the north track, which also acted as a layover track for TCDD trains. In anticipation for new commuter rail service, turnstiles and PIS boards were added. With the completion of tunnel, TCDD resumed train service to central İzmir on 19 May 2010, but most trains still stopped at Ulukent. On 29 October 2010, İZBAN began testing on the line, running trains from Halkapınar to Aliağa, via Ulukent. Finally on 30 January 2011, regular commuter rail service began. Due to high demand, service frequency was increased on 15 May 2011 from hourly to half-hourly. With the opening of the system, intercity trains bypassed the station, with only the İzmir to Uşak regional continuing to stop there for a few more years.

Ulukent had the last grade crossing on the central İZBAN system until 2013, when a bridge was built over the railway.

== Station layout ==
Overpass/Mezzanine	Customer service	Tickets/Exits
Tracks	Track 1	İZBAN to Aliağa or Menemen (Egekent 2) ←
Tracks	Island platform, doors on the right or left
Tracks	Track 2	İZBAN to Cumaovası or Tepeköy (Egekent) →
Tracks	Track 3	In non-regular use
Tracks	Side platform, no service

== Connections ==
ESHOT operates regional bus service, accessible from the station.

ESHOT Bus service
Route number	Stop	Route	Location
128	Ulukent Gar	Egekent 2 — Egekent Aktarma	Çanakkale Asfaltı Street
428	Ulukent Gar	Egekent 2 — Bostanlı İskele	Çanakkale Asfaltı Street
602	Ulukent Gar	Menemen Aktarma — İzmir Otogar	Çanakkale Asfaltı Street
619	Ulukent Aktarma	Seyrek — Ulukent Aktarma Merkezi 2	10015th Street
660	Ulukent Gar	Yeni Foça — İzmir Otogar	Çanakkale Asfaltı Street
695	Ulukent Gar	Ulukent Koop. — Egekent Aktarma Merkezi	Çanakkale Asfaltı Street
749	Ulukent Gar	Ulukent Aktarma Merkezi 1 — Menemen Aktarma Merkezi	Çanakkale Asfaltı Street
750	Ulukent Aktarma	Yeni Foça — Ulukent Aktarma Merkezi 2	10015th Street
757	Ulukent Aktarma	Maltepe — Ulukent Aktarma Merkezi 2	10015th Street
800	Ulukent Gar	Menemen Aktarma — Bornova Metro	Çanakkale Asfaltı Street
812	Ulukent Aktarma	Bakırçay Üniversitesi — Ulukent Aktarma Merkezi 2	10015th Street
826	Ulukent Gar	Gazi Mahallesi — Ulukent Aktarma Merkezi 1	Çanakkale Asfaltı Street
827	Ulukent Gar	Ulukent Aktarma Merkezi — Bostanlı İskele	Çanakkale Asfaltı Street
850	Ulukent Aktarma	Tuzçullu — Seyrek — Ulukent Aktarma Merkezi 2	10015th Street
