= Demirköprü railway station =

Railway station in Karşıyaka, İzmir, Turkey

Demirköprü
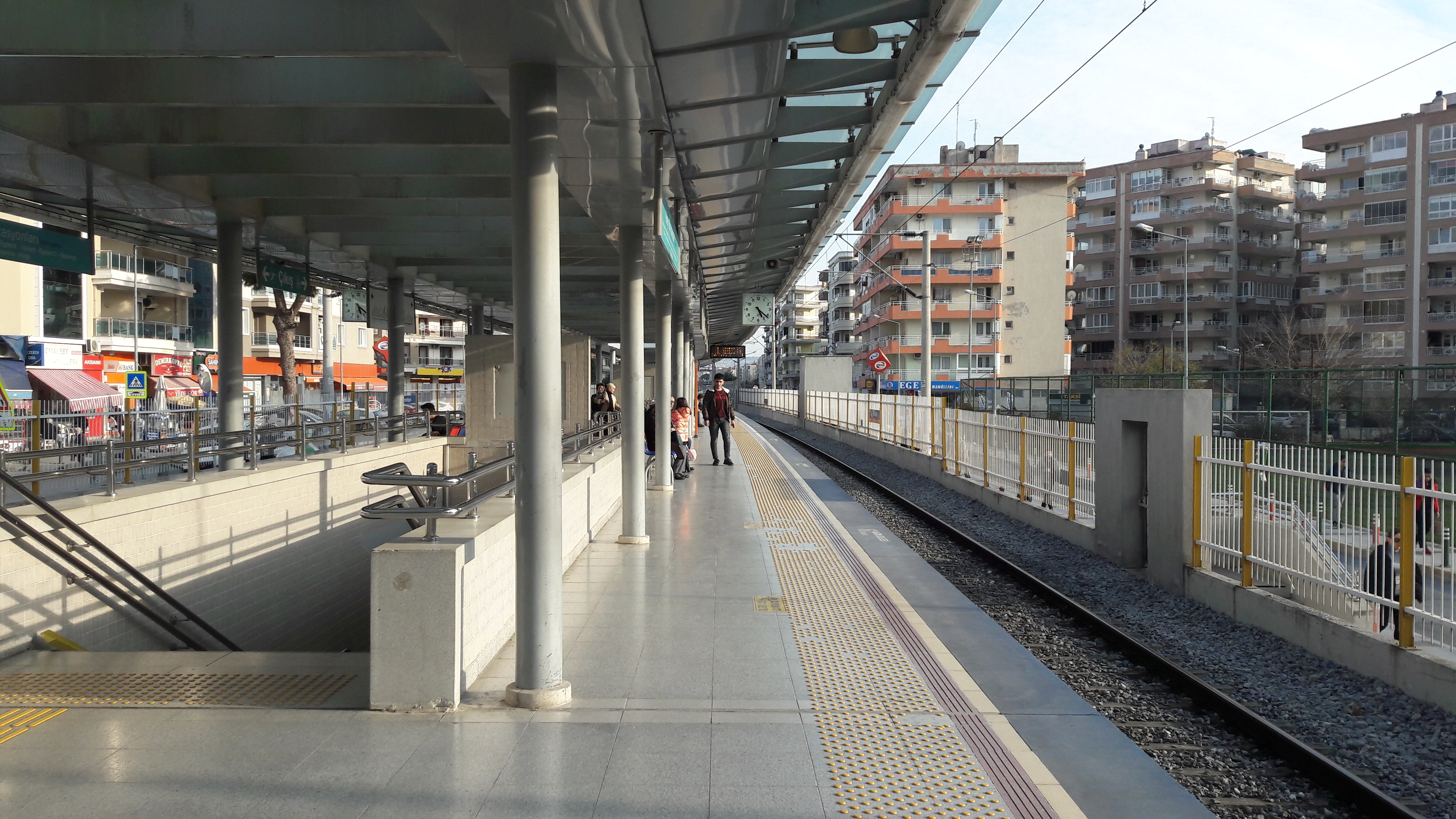

General information
- System: İZBAN commuter rail station
- Owner: Turkish State Railways
- Operator: TCDD Transport; İZBAN A.Ş.
- Line: İZBAN Line
- Platforms: 2 side platforms
- Tracks: 2

Construction
- Structure type: At-grade
- Parking: No
- Accessible: Yes

History
- Opened: 2001
- Rebuilt: 2006-2010
- Electrified: 2001 (25 kV AC)
- Former names: Yalı

Services
Preceding station	İZBAN	Following station
Nergiz towards Cumaovası	Aliağa-Cumaovası	Şemikler towards Aliağa
Nergiz towards Tepeköy	Aliağa-Tepeköy (Late nights)	Şemikler towards Aliağa
Nergiz towards Tepeköy	Menemen-Tepeköy	Şemikler towards Menemen
Other services
Preceding station	Turkish State Railways	Following station
Nergiz towards İzmir (Basmane)	Çiğli suburban	Şemikler towards Çiğli
Location

Demirköprü is a railway station in İzmir. İZBAN operates commuter trains north to Aliağa and Menemen and south to Cumaovası and Tepeköy. Demirköprü is the first station west of the Karşıyaka tunnel.
