= Semt Garajı railway station =

Railway station in İzmir, Turkey

Semt Garajı
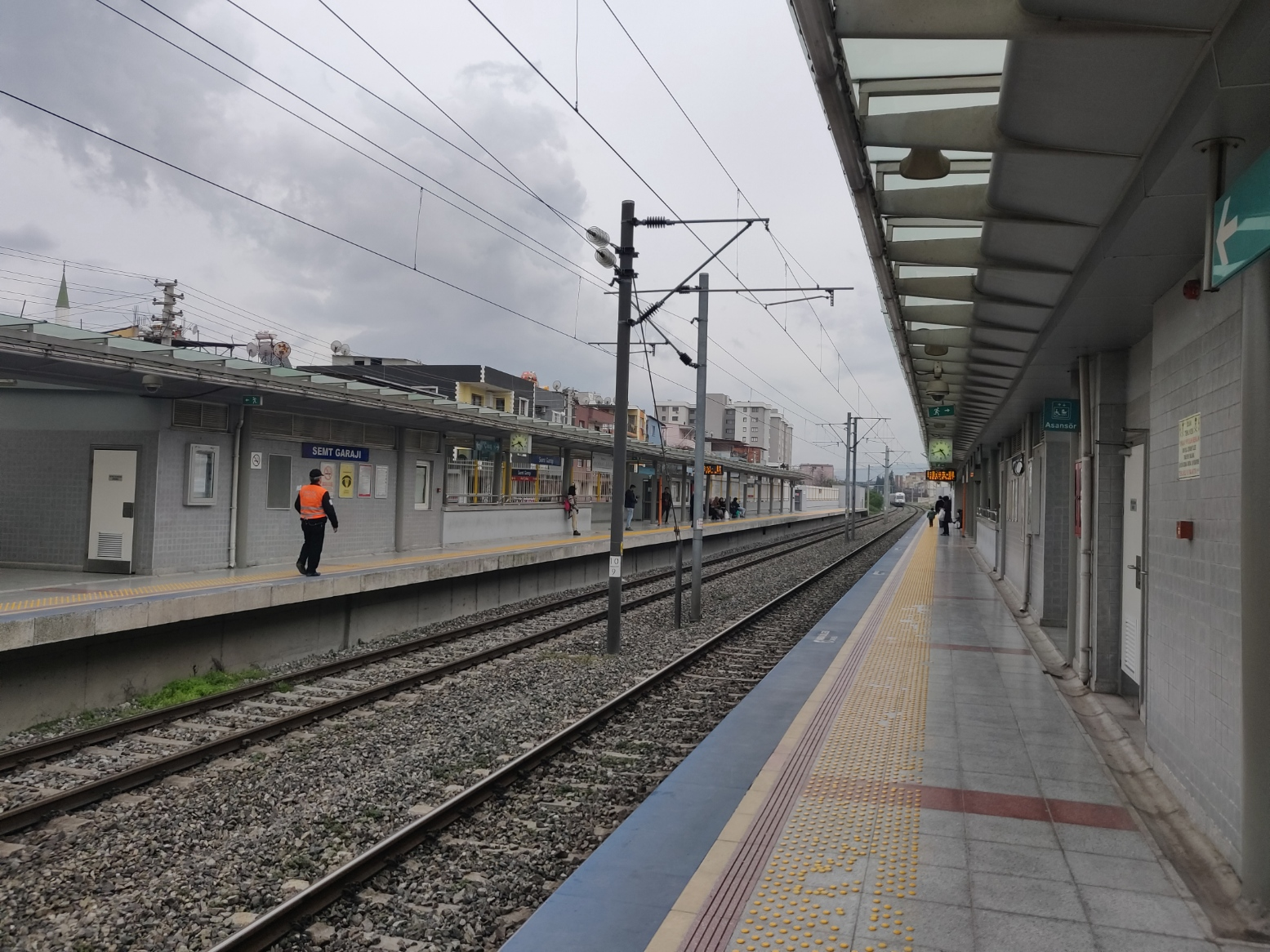

General information
- System: İZBAN commuter rail station
- Owner: Turkish State Railways
- Operator: TCDD Transport; İZBAN A.Ş.
- Line: İzmir-Eğirdir railway
- Platforms: 2 side platforms
- Tracks: 2
- Connections: ESHOT Bus: 152, 200, 508, 516, 539, 610, 691, 823, 828, 877, 879, 887, 891, 910

Construction
- Accessible: Yes

History
- Opened: 1970
- Electrified: 2001
- Former names: Semt

Services
Preceding station	İZBAN	Following station
İnkılap towards Aliağa	Aliağa-Cumaovası	ESBAŞ towards Cumaovası
İnkılap towards Aliağa	Aliağa-Tepeköy (Late nights)	ESBAŞ towards Tepeköy
İnkılap towards Menemen	Menemen-Tepeköy	ESBAŞ towards Tepeköy
Location

Semt Garajı previously Semt is a railway station in İzmir. The station is served by İZBAN. The current station was built between 2006–09 and opened on 30 August 2010.

== Connections ==
ESHOT operates regional bus service, accessible from the station.

ESHOT Bus service
Route number	Stop	Route	Location
152	Gaziemir Semt Garajı	Gaziemir — Konak	Akçay Street
200	Gaziemir Semt Garajı	Mavişehir Aktarma Merkezi — Havalimanı (Airport)	Akçay Street
508	Gaziemir Semt Garajı	Menderes — Konak	Akçay Street
516	Gaziemir Semt Garajı	Yenitepe Evleri — Gaziemir Semt Garajı	Akçay Street
539	Gaziemir Semt Garajı	Yenitepe Evleri — Salhane Aktarma Merekzi	Akçay Street
610	Gaziemir Semt Garajı	Fuar İzmir — Gaziemir Semt Garajı	Akçay Street
691	Gaziemir Semt Garajı	Gaziemir — Lozan Meydanı	Akçay Street
823	Gaziemir Semt Garajı	Üçyol — Gaziemir Semt Garajı	Akçay Street
828	Gaziemir Semt Garajı	Sarnıç — Yeni Çamlık	Akçay Street
877	Gaziemir Semt Garajı	Uzundere Toplu Konutları — Gaziemir Semt Garajı	Akçay Street
879	Gaziemir Semt Garajı	F. Altay — Gaziemir Semt Garajı	Akçay Street
887	Gaziemir Semt Garajı	Sarnıç Aktarma Merekzi — Konak	Akçay Street
891	Gaziemir Semt Garajı	Evka 7 — Gaziemir Semt Garajı	Akçay Street
910 (night bus)	Gaziemir Semt Garajı	Gaziemir — Konak	Akçay Street
