= ESBAŞ railway station =

ESBAŞ
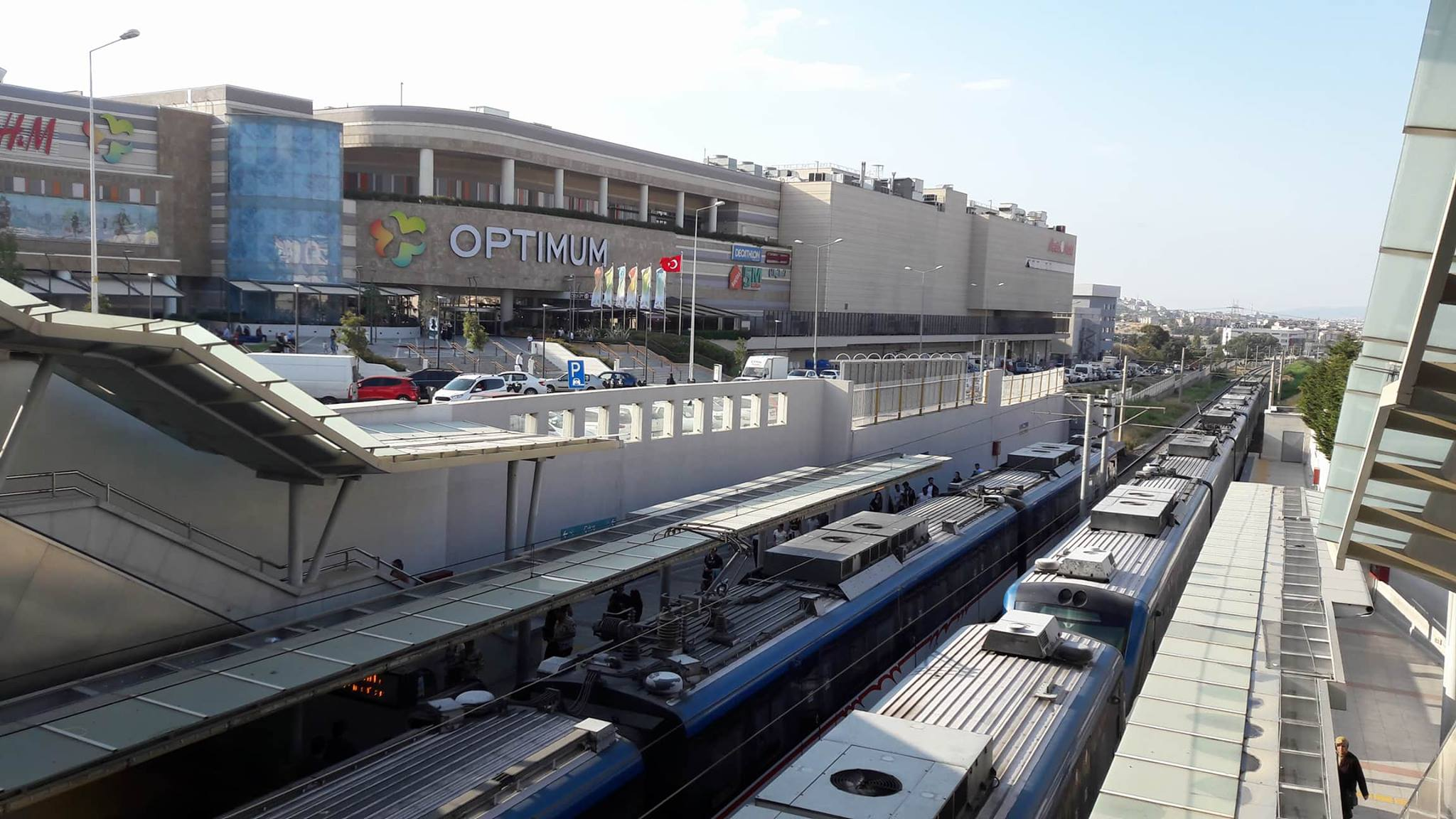
- Two İZBAN trains meet at ESBAŞ, with the Optimum Shopping Center in the background.

General information
- Coordinates: 38.3370°N 27.1365°E
- System: İZBAN commuter rail station
- Owner: Turkish State Railways
- Operator: TCDD Transport; İZBAN A.Ş.
- Line: İzmir-Eğirdir railway
- Platforms: 2 side platforms
- Tracks: 2
- Connections: ESHOT Bus: 233, 353, 808, 818, 828

Construction
- Accessible: Yes

History
- Opened: 30 August 2010
- Electrified: 25 kV

Services
Preceding station	İZBAN	Following station
Semt Garajı towards Aliağa	Aliağa-Cumaovası	Gaziemir towards Cumaovası
Semt Garajı towards Aliağa	Aliağa-Tepeköy (Late nights)	Gaziemir towards Tepeköy
Semt Garajı towards Menemen	Menemen-Tepeköy	Gaziemir towards Tepeköy
Location

ESBAŞ railway station (Turkish: ESBAŞ Tren İstasyonu) is an İZBAN station in northern Gaziemir, İzmir. The station was opened on 30 August 2010 as one of the five new railway stations added to the line. Passenger traffic greatly increased in 2012, when the Optimum Outlet opened adjacent to ESBAŞ station. It named after Aegean Free Zone's abbreviation in Turkish, ESBAŞ.

Like most İZBAN stations, ESBAŞ consists of two side platforms serving two tracks. The station lobby is located on a bridge over the tracks, consisting of turnstiles, ticket machines and station security. Escalators and elevators are available for both platforms.

== Connections ==
ESHOT operates regional bus service, accessible from the station.

ESHOT Bus service
Route number	Stop	Route	Location
233	Esbaş	Esbaş Aktarma Merkezi — Konak	Esbaş Terminal
353	Esbaş	Gaziemir — Tınaztepe	Esbaş Terminal
808	Esbaş	Cumaovası Aktarma Merkezi — ESBAŞ Aktarma Merkezi	Esbaş Terminal
818	Esbaş	Esbaş Aktarma Merkezi — Şirinyer Aktarma Merkezi	Esbaş Terminal
828	Esbaş	Sarnıç — Yeni Çamlık	Esbaş Terminal

== Gallery ==
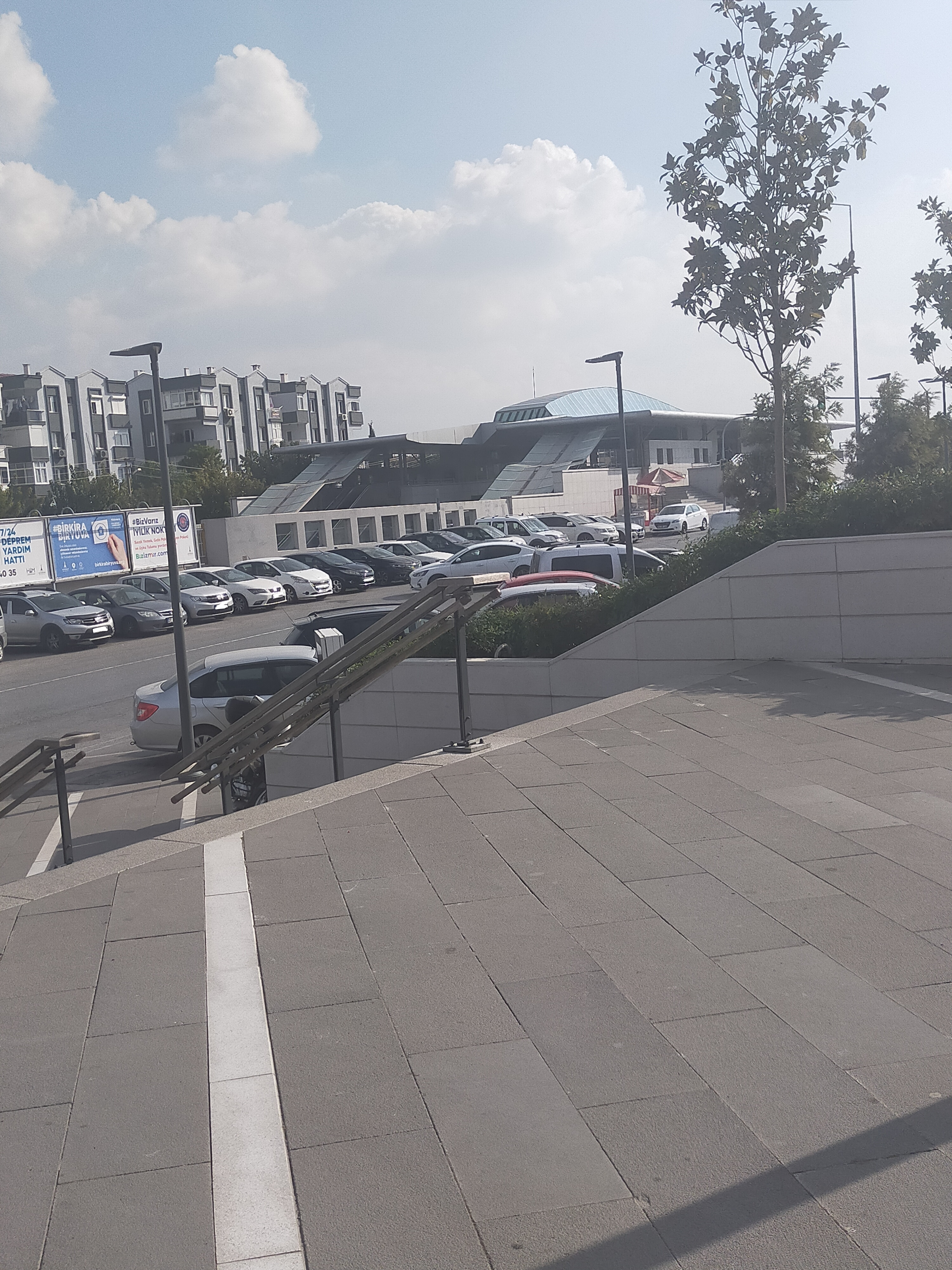
Station building from outside

== Nearby places of interest ==
- Optimum Shopping Center
