= Turan railway station =

Railway station in İzmir, Turkey

Turan
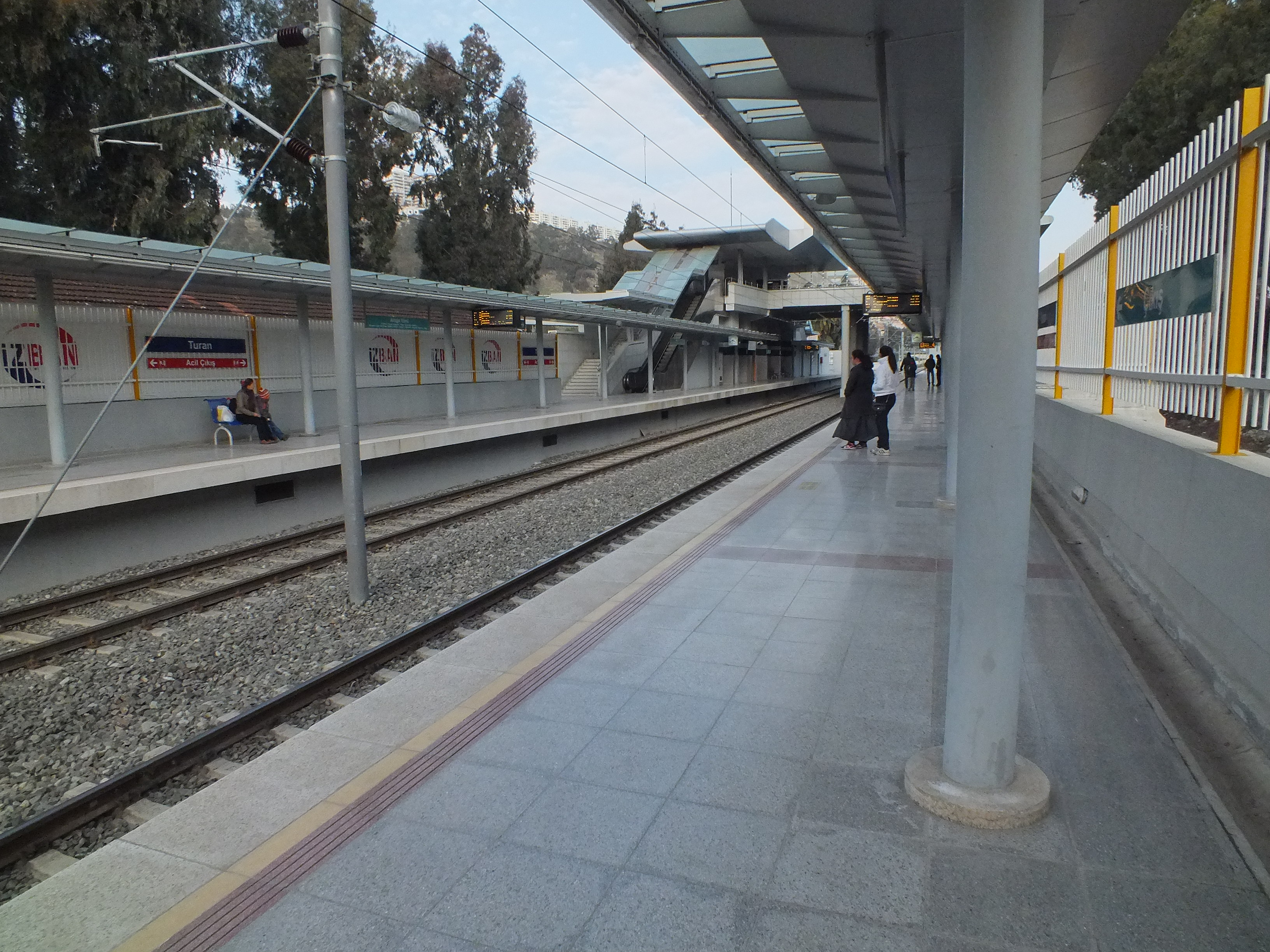

General information
- Location: Anadolu Cd., Turan Mah. 35590; Bayraklı, İzmir; Turkey
- Coordinates: 38.4668°N 27.1494°E
- System: İZBAN commuter rail station
- Owner: Turkish State Railways
- Operator: TCDD Transport; İZBAN A.Ş.
- Line: İZBAN Line
- Platforms: 2 side platforms
- Tracks: 3
- Connections: ESHOT Bus: 77, 78, 121, 125, 140, 147, 148, 200, 240, 290, 330, 335, 426, 434, 477, 543, 577, 602, 608, 660, 800, 830, 912, 920

Construction
- Structure type: At-grade
- Parking: No
- Cycle facilities: No
- Accessible: Yes

History
- Closed: 2006-10
- Rebuilt: 1984, 2007-08
- Electrified: 2001; 25 kV AC, 50 Hz

Services
Preceding station	İZBAN	Following station
Bayraklı towards Cumaovası	Aliağa-Cumaovası	Naldöken towards Aliağa
Bayraklı towards Tepeköy	Menemen-Tepeköy	Naldöken towards Menemen
Bayraklı towards Tepeköy	Aliağa-Tepeköy (Late nights)	Naldöken towards Aliağa
Former services
Preceding station	Turkish State Railways	Following station
Bayraklı towards İzmir (Basmane)	Çiğli suburban	Naldöken towards Çiğli
Location

Turan railway station is a railway station in İzmir. İZBAN operates commuter trains north to Aliağa and Menemen and south to Cumaovası and Tepeköy.

== Connections ==
ESHOT operates regional bus service, accessible from the station.

ESHOT Bus service
Route number	Stop	Route	Location
77	Turan	Nafiz Gürman — Halkapınar Metro 2	Anadolu Street
78	Turan	Yamanlar — Halkapınar Metro 2	Anadolu Street
121	Turan	Mavişehir Aktarma Merkezi — Konak	Anadolu Street
125	Turan	Mustafa Kemal Mah. — Halkapınar Metro 2	Anadolu Street
140	Turan	Örnekköy — Halkapınar Metro 2	Anadolu Street
147	Turan	Postacı — Halkapınar Metro 2	Anadolu Street
148	Turan	Onur Mah — Halkapınar Metro 2	Anadolu Street
200	Turan	Mavişehir Aktarma Merkezi — Havalimanı (Airport)	Anadolu Street
240	Turan	Zübeyde Hanım Mah. — Halkapınar Metro 2	Anadolu Street
290	Turan	Bostanlı İskele — Tınaztepe	Anadolu Street
330	Turan	Bostanlı İskele — Evka 3 Metro	Anadolu Street
335	Turan	Doğançay — Halkapınar Metro 2	Anadolu Street
426	Turan	Mustafa Kemal Mah. — Halkapınar Metro 2	Anadolu Street
434	Turan	Körfez Mahallesi — Halkapınar Metro 2	Anadolu Street
477	Turan	Nafiz Gürman — Halkapınar Metro 2	Anadolu Street
543	Turan	Nafiz Gürman — H. Pınar Metro	Anadolu Street
577	Turan	Nafiz Gürman — Halkapınar Metro 2	Anadolu Street
602	Turan	Menemen Aktarma — İzmir Otogar	Anadolu Street
608	Turan	Egekent 2 — İzmir Otogar	Anadolu Street
660	Turan	Yeni Foça — İzmir Otogar	Anadolu Street
800	Turan	Menemen Aktarma — Bornova Metro	Anadolu Street
830	Turan	Egekent Aktarma Merkezi — Bornova Metro	Anadolu Street
912	Turan	Egekent Aktarma Merkezi — Alsancak Gar	Anadolu Street
920 (night bus)	Turan	Çiğli — Konak	Anadolu Street
