= Şemikler railway station =

Railway station in Karşıyaka, İzmir, Turkey

Şemikler
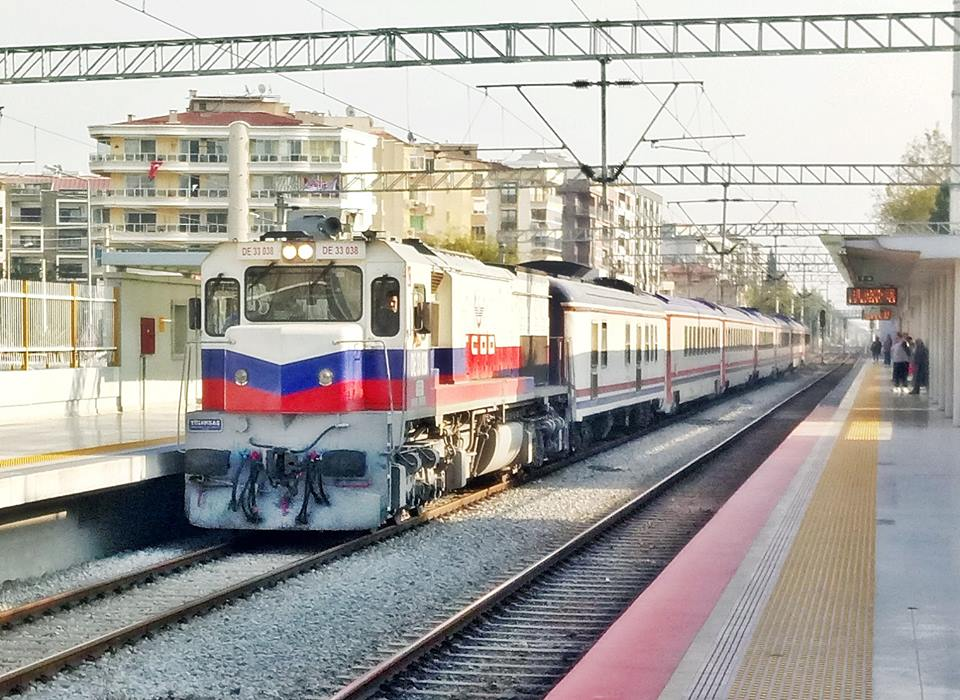
- The Uşak Express passing the station.

General information
- System: İZBAN commuter rail station
- Owner: Turkish State Railways
- Operator: TCDD Transport; İZBAN A.Ş.
- Line: İZBAN Line
- Platforms: 2 side platforms
- Tracks: 3

Construction
- Structure type: At-grade
- Parking: Yes
- Accessible: Yes

History
- Opened: 2001
- Rebuilt: 2006-2010
- Electrified: 2001 (25 kV AC)

Services
Preceding station	İZBAN	Following station
Demirköprü towards Cumaovası	Aliağa-Cumaovası	Mavişehir towards Aliağa
Demirköprü towards Tepeköy	Aliağa-Tepeköy (Late nights)	Mavişehir towards Aliağa
Demirköprü towards Tepeköy	Menemen-Tepeköy	Mavişehir towards Menemen
Location

Şemikler is a railway station in İzmir. İZBAN operates commuter trains north to Aliağa and Menemen and south to Cumaovası and Tepeköy.
