= Egekent 2 railway station =

Railway station in Menemen, İzmir, Turkey

Egekent 2
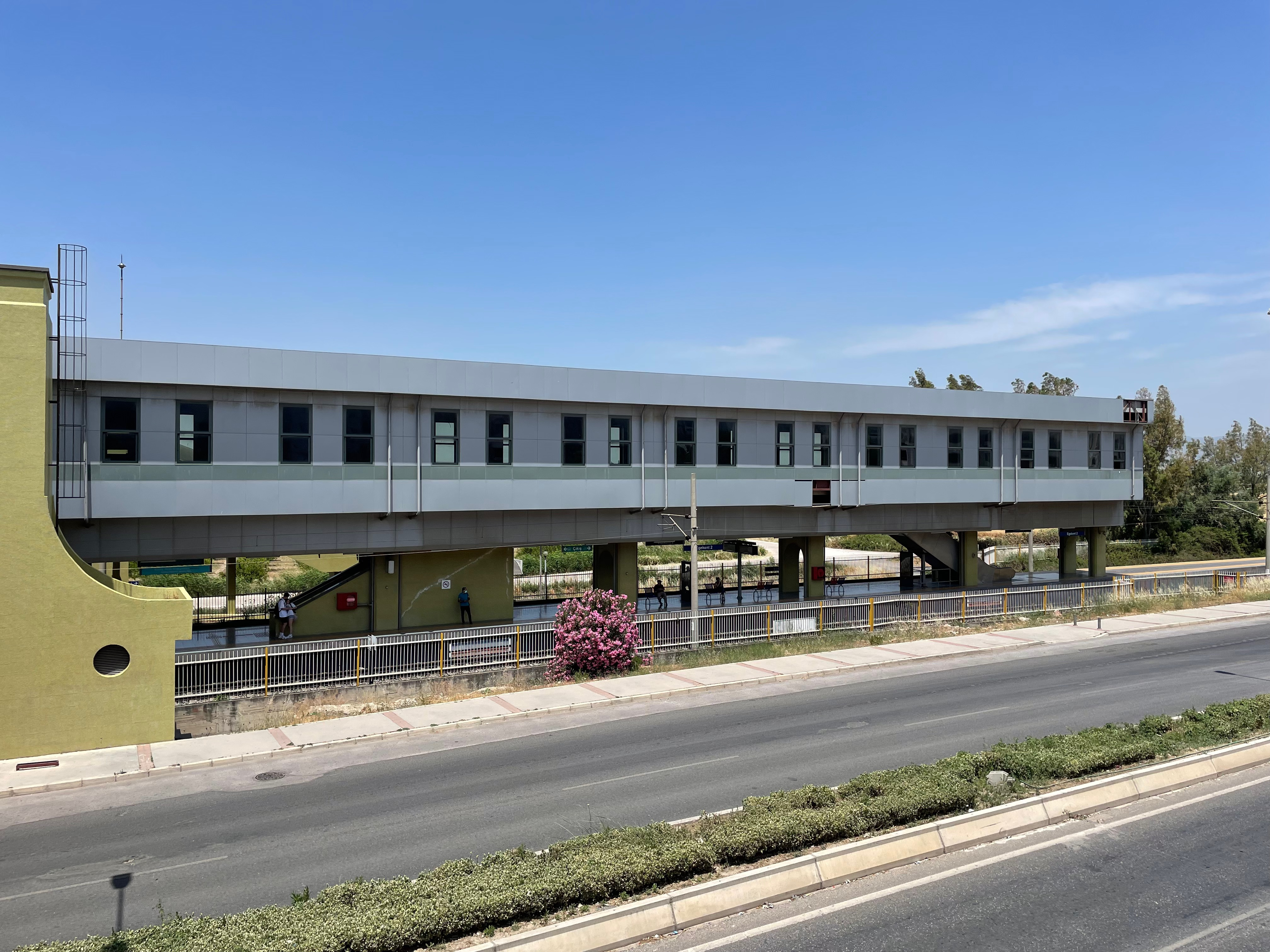

General information
- System: İZBAN commuter rail station
- Owner: Turkish State Railways
- Operator: İZBAN A.Ş.
- Line: İzmir-Afyon railway
- Platforms: 1 (island platform)
- Tracks: 2
- Connections: ESHOT Bus: Egekent 2: 128, 602, 660, 698, 748, 800, 848; Üst Geçit: 128, 602, 660, 698, 748, 800, 848

Construction
- Structure type: At-grade
- Parking: No
- Accessible: Yes

History
- Opened: 30 January 2011
- Electrified: 2004 (25 kV AC)

Services
| Preceding station | İZBAN | Following station |
|---|---|---|
| Ulukent towards Cumaovası | Aliağa-Cumaovası | Menemen towards Aliağa |
| Ulukent towards Tepeköy | Aliağa-Tepeköy (Late nights) | Menemen towards Aliağa |
| Ulukent towards Tepeköy | Menemen-Tepeköy | Menemen Terminus |
Location

Egekent 2 is a railway station on the İZBAN commuter rail network in İzmir, Turkey. It is located on the west side of the D.550 highway in the neighborhood of 29 Ekim. The station opened on 30 January 2011.

The station is within Central line of the İZBAN system. Trains run north to Menemen and Aliağa; and south to Alsancak, Cumaovası and Tepeköy.

The station itself has a unique design, in comparison to the rest of the stations in İzmir. The mezzanine of Egekent 2 is located in an elongated structure above the platform. Here lie the fare turnstiles and information booth for the station, along with a small waiting area. This design was later utilized in Ankara during the renovation of its commuter rail line.

== History ==
The land for the station was originally reserved during the mid-1990s, when the Turkish State Railways constructed the Menemen-Aliağa railway, in anticipation of expanded commuter rail service in İzmir. However the station itself was not built until 2004, when the electrification of railway from İzmir to Aliağa was completed. Following its construction, Egekent 2 would not yet be serviced by any trains for several more years. The station was finally opened on 30 January 2011, as part of the 31 km (19 mi) expansion of İZBAN's Northern Line from Çiğli to Aliağa.

== Connections ==
ESHOT operates regional bus service, accessible from the station.

ESHOT Bus service
| Route number | Stop | Route | Location |
|---|---|---|---|
| 128 | Egekent 2, Üst Geçit | Egekent 2 — Egekent Aktarma | Çanakkale Asfaltı Street |
| 602 | Egekent 2, Üst Geçit | Menemen Aktarma — İzmir Otogar | Çanakkale Asfaltı Street |
| 660 | Egekent 2, Üst Geçit | Yeni Foça — İzmir Otogar | Çanakkale Asfaltı Street |
| 698 | Egekent 2, Üst Geçit | Asırlık Toplu Konutları — Ulukent Aktarma Merkezi 1 | Çanakkale Asfaltı Street |
| 748 | Egekent 2, Üst Geçit | Ulukent Aktarma Merkezi 1 — Menemen Aktarma Merkezi | Çanakkale Asfaltı Street |
| 800 | Egekent 2, Üst Geçit | Menemen Aktarma — Bornova Metro | Çanakkale Asfaltı Street |
| 848 | Egekent 2, Üst Geçit | Koyundere — Ulukent Aktarma Merkezi 1 | Çanakkale Asfaltı Street |
