= Biçerova railway station =

Railway station in Aliağa, İzmir, Turkey

Biçerova
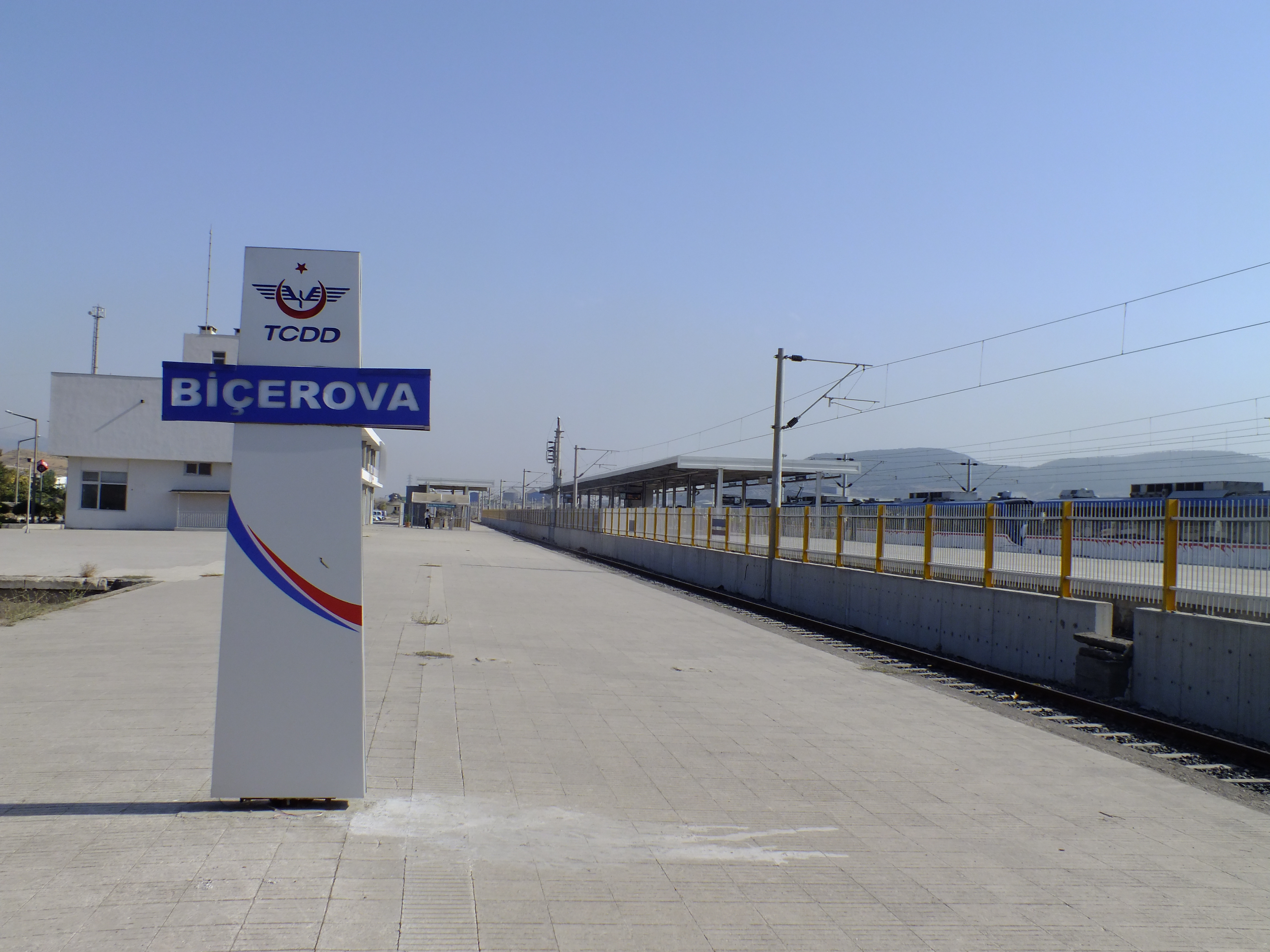
- Biçerova station.

General information
- Coordinates: 38°44′57″N 26°57′39″E
- System: İZBAN commuter rail station
- Owner: Turkish State Railways
- Operator: İZBAN A.Ş.
- Line: Menemen-Aliağa railway
- Platforms: 1 side platform 1 island platform
- Tracks: 3
- Connections: ESHOT: 745, 753

Construction
- Parking: Yes
- Accessible: Yes

Other information
- Status: In Operation

History
- Opened: 1996
- Closed: 2006-11
- Rebuilt: 2009-11
- Electrified: 25 kV AC (2002)

Passengers
- 2011: 200,247

Services
Preceding station	İZBAN	Following station
Hatundere towards Cumaovası	Aliağa-Cumaovası	Aliağa Terminus
Hatundere towards Tepeköy	Aliağa-Tepeköy (Late nights)	Aliağa Terminus
Location

Biçerova station (Turkish: Biçerova istasyonu) is a railway station in İzmir. İZBAN operates commuter trains north to Aliağa and south to Cumaovası and Tepeköy. It is located a few kilometers south of Aliağa in İzmir. The station is also a transfer center for buses to Yenifoça on the Aegean Sea.

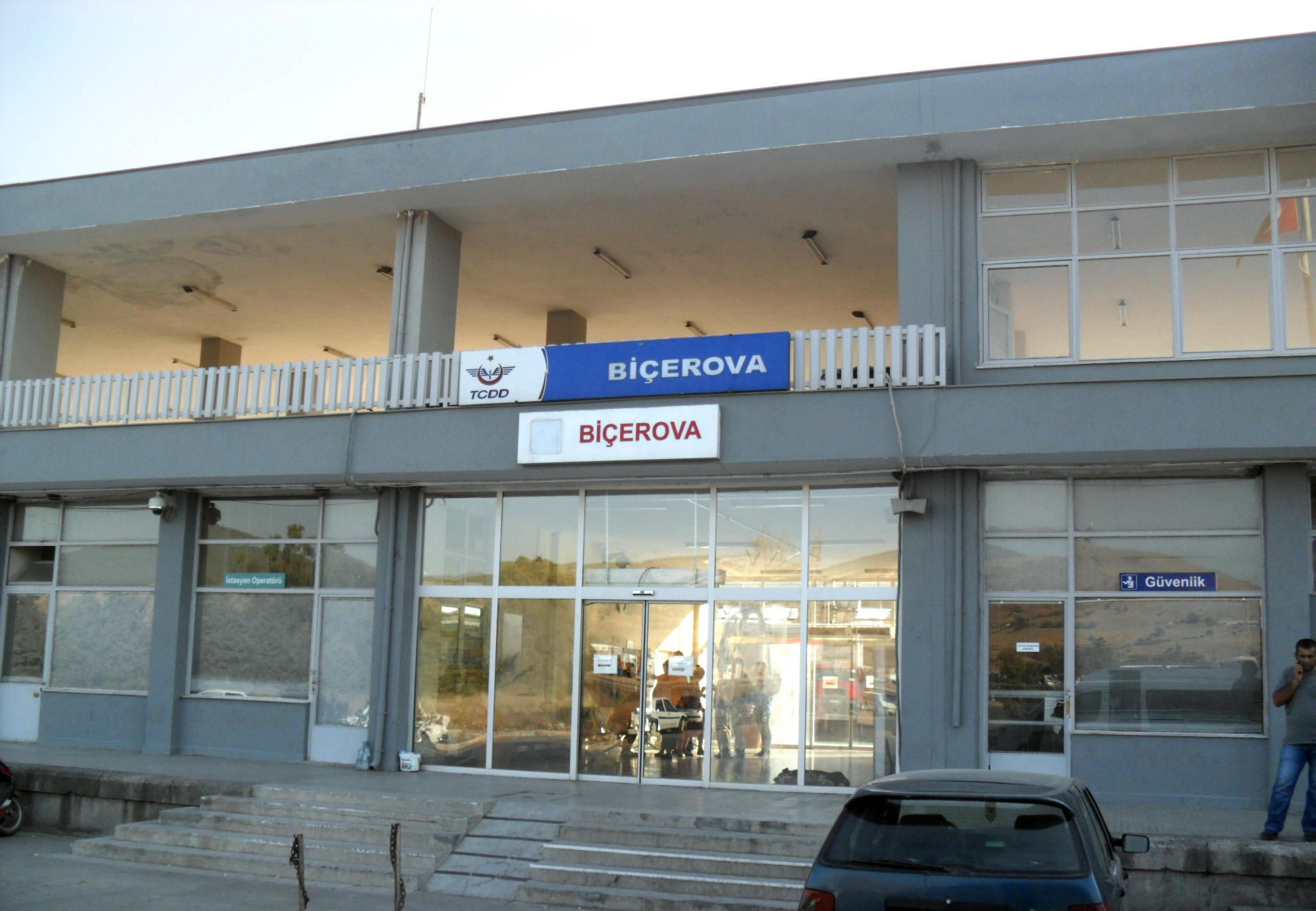

Biçerova was built in 1996 by the Turkish State Railways and closed to passenger traffic in 2006. On 30 January 2011, passenger service resumed.

== Bus connections ==
ESHOT

- 745 Biçerova Aktarma - Yenifoça
- 753 Biçerova Aktarma - Gerenköy
