= Naldöken railway station =

Railway station in İzmir, Turkey

Naldöken
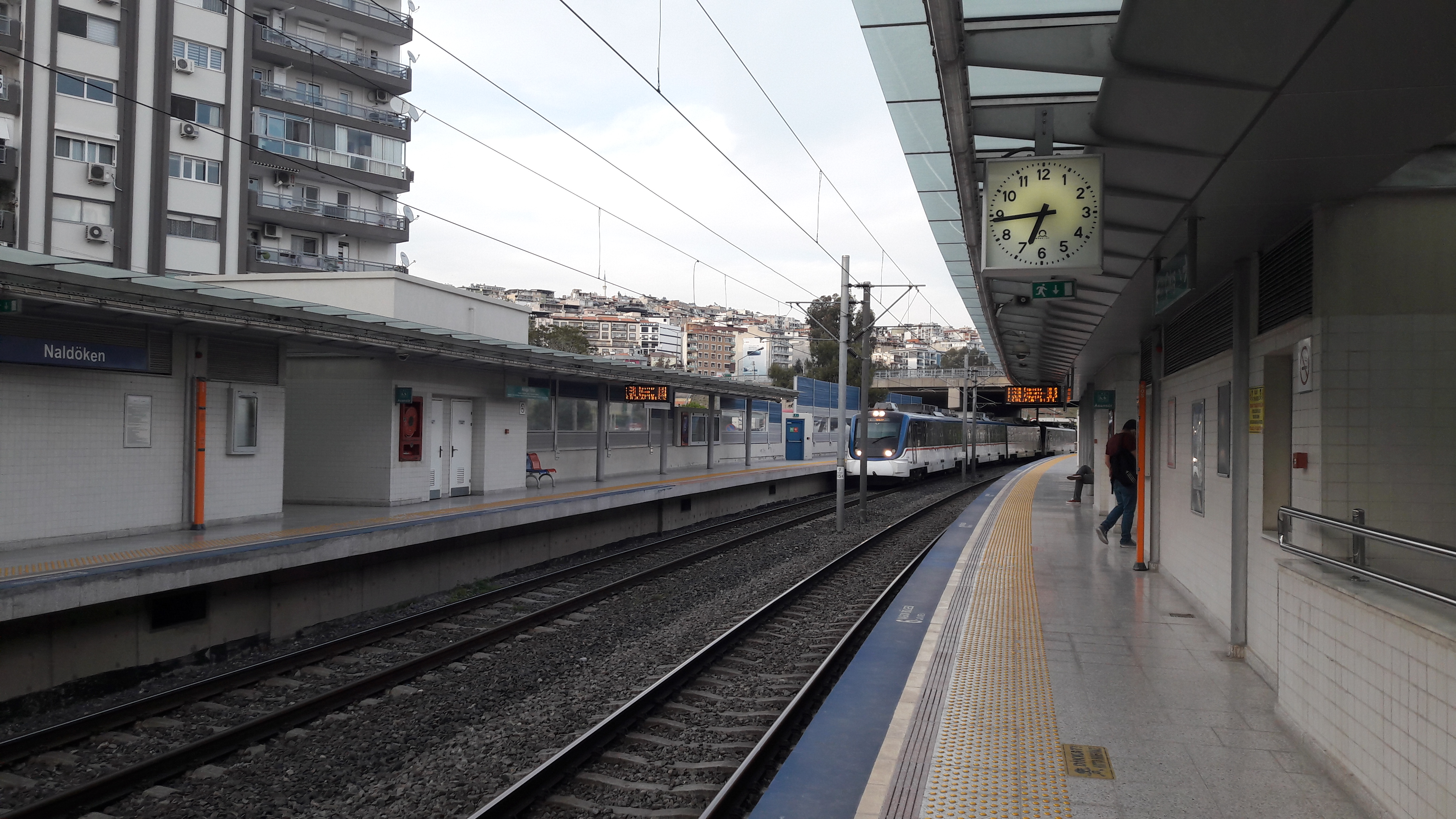
- A northbound train entering the station.

General information
- Coordinates: 38.4647°N 27.1283°E
- System: İZBAN commuter rail station
- Owner: Turkish State Railways
- Operator: TCDD Transport; İZBAN A.Ş.
- Line: İZBAN Line
- Platforms: 2 side platforms
- Tracks: 2

Construction
- Structure type: At-grade
- Parking: No
- Accessible: Yes

History
- Opened: 2001
- Rebuilt: 2010
- Electrified: 2001 (25 kV AC)

Services
Preceding station	İZBAN	Following station
Turan towards Cumaovası	Aliağa-Cumaovası	Alaybey towards Aliağa
Turan towards Tepeköy	Menemen-Tepeköy	Alaybey towards Menemen
Turan towards Tepeköy	Aliağa-Tepeköy (Late nights)	Alaybey towards Aliağa
Former services
Preceding station	Turkish State Railways	Following station
Turan towards İzmir (Basmane)	Çiğli suburban	Alaybey towards Çiğli
Location

Naldöken is a railway station in İzmir. İZBAN operates commuter trains north to Aliağa and Menemen and south to Cumaovası and Tepeköy. Naldöken is the first station east of the Karşıyaka tunnel.
