= Karşıyaka railway station =

Railway station in Karşıyaka, İzmir, Turkey

Karşıyaka
- View of Karşıyaka Izban from inside in 2011

General information
- Coordinates: 38.457868°N 27.115071°E
- System: İZBAN commuter rail station
- Owner: Turkish State Railways
- Operator: TCDD Transport; İZBAN A.Ş.
- Line: İZBAN Line
- Platforms: 2 side platforms
- Tracks: 2

Construction
- Structure type: Underground
- Parking: No
- Accessible: Yes

History
- Opened: October 10, 1865
- Rebuilt: 2006-2010
- Electrified: 2001 (25 kV AC)

Passengers
- 2011: 2.061.535 ▲69%

Services
Preceding station	İZBAN	Following station
Alaybey towards Cumaovası	Aliağa-Cumaovası	Nergiz towards Aliağa
Alaybey towards Tepeköy	Aliağa-Tepeköy (Late nights)	Nergiz towards Aliağa
Alaybey towards Tepeköy	Menemen-Tepeköy	Nergiz towards Menemen
Former services
Preceding station	Turkish State Railways	Following station
Alaybey towards İzmir (Basmane)	Çiğli suburban	Nergiz towards Çiğli
Location

Karşıyaka is a historic railway station currently in use on the İZBAN commuter rail system in the famous Karşıyaka district of İzmir. The station is located at the northern end of the Karşıyaka Çarşı (Main Street). The station is located underground in the Karşıyaka Tunnel. It is the busiest İZBAN station in terms of passengers, serving approximately 8,380 passengers daily. The station is also a transfer point for minibus services to nearby towns.

== Overview ==
The original station was opened on October 10, 1865, by the Smyrna Cassaba Railway. On June 1, 1934, the Turkish State Railways acquired the station when they bought the SCP. The station has become a landmark of the district and had TCDD #44062 locomotive plinthed next to the station. On July 23, 2006, the station was closed for construction of the new underground station. Karşıyaka station was moved underground and the former trackbed above was converted into a park. The station reopened on December 10, 2010, after remaining dormant for over four years.
