= Nergiz railway station =

Railway station in İzmir, Turkey

Nergiz
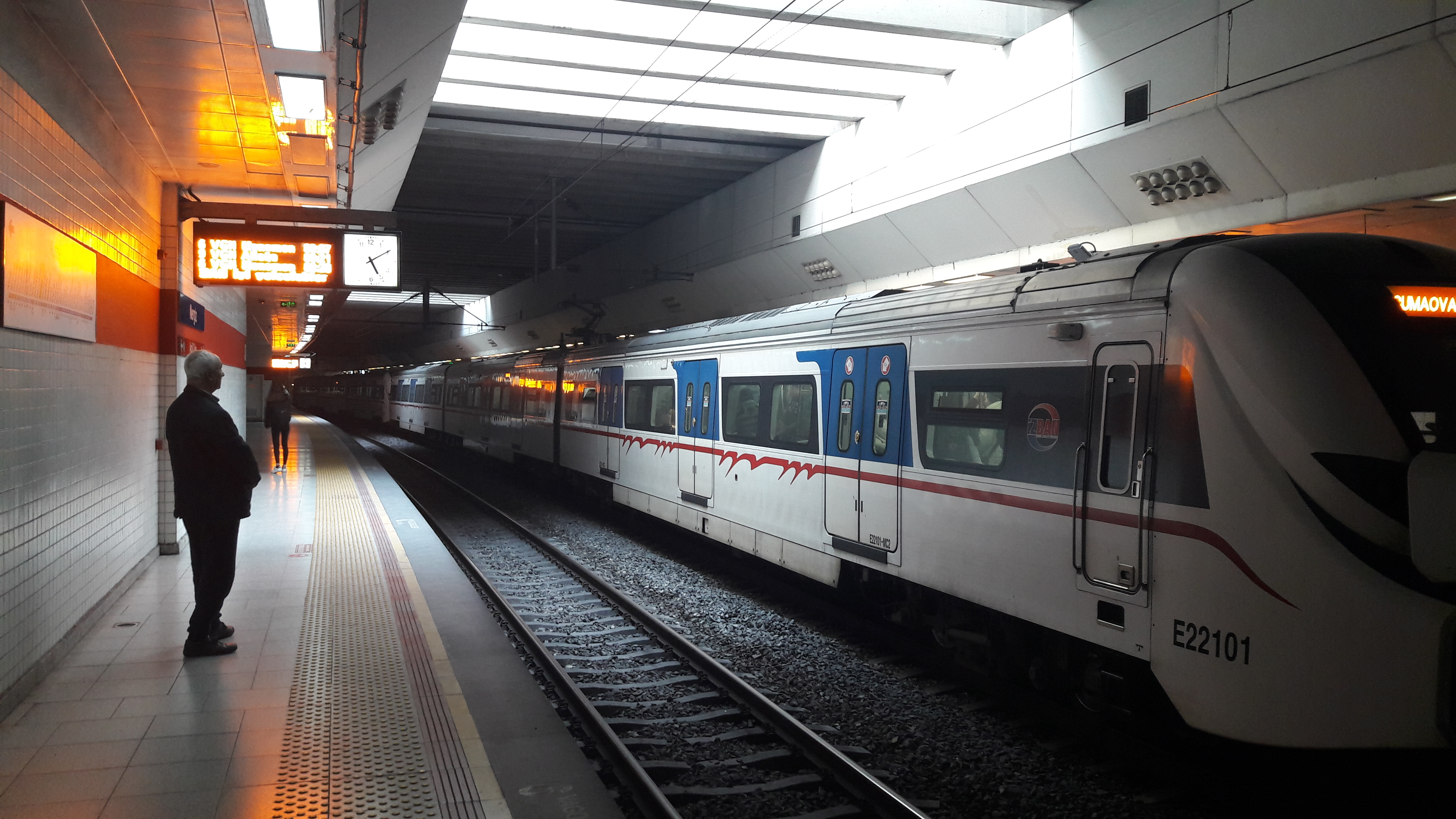
- A southbound İZBAN train at the station.

General information
- Coordinates: 38.459517°N 27.104738°E
- System: İZBAN commuter rail station
- Owner: Turkish State Railways
- Operator: TCDD Transport; İZBAN A.Ş.
- Line: İZBAN Line
- Platforms: 2 side platforms
- Tracks: 2

Construction
- Structure type: Underground
- Parking: No
- Accessible: Yes

History
- Opened: 2001
- Rebuilt: 2006-2010
- Electrified: 2001 (25 kV AC)

Services
Preceding station	İZBAN	Following station
Karşıyaka towards Cumaovası	Aliağa-Cumaovası	Demirköprü towards Aliağa
Karşıyaka towards Tepeköy	Aliağa-Tepeköy (Late nights)	Demirköprü towards Aliağa
Karşıyaka towards Tepeköy	Menemen-Tepeköy	Demirköprü towards Menemen
Former services
Preceding station	Turkish State Railways	Following station
Karşıyaka towards İzmir (Basmane)	Çiğli suburban	Yalı towards Çiğli
Location

Nergiz is a railway station in İzmir. İZBAN operates commuter trains north to Aliağa and Menemen and south to Cumaovası and Tepeköy.
