= Pancar railway station =

PANCAR
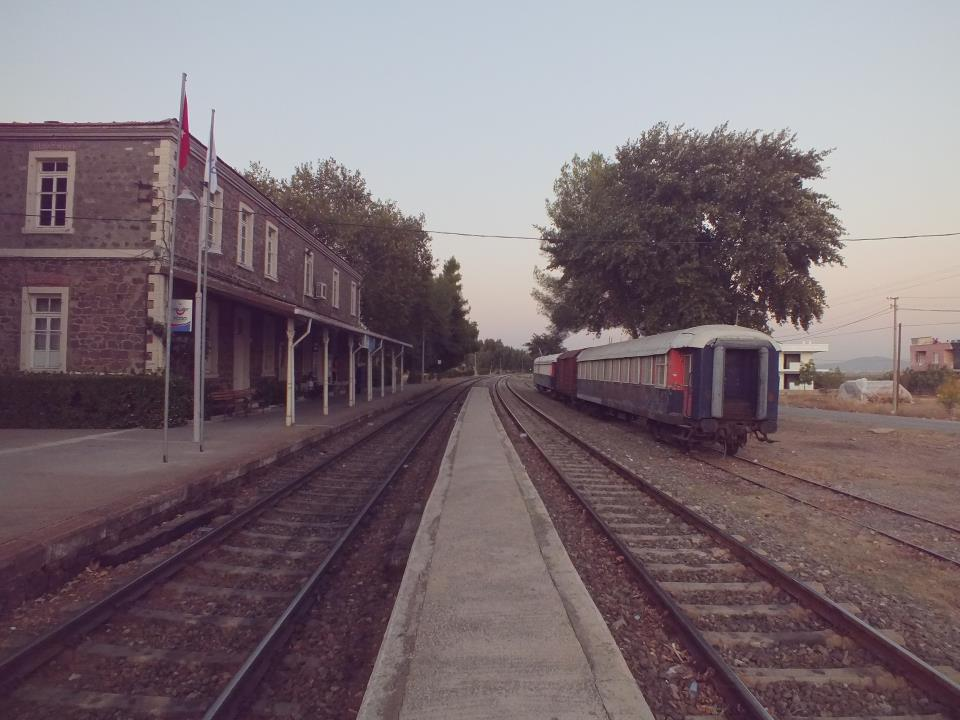
- Pancar station in 2011, before the İZBAN platform was built.

General information
- Location: Şehit Erdinç Tekeli Cd. 146, Kazım Karabekir Mah. 35860, Torbalı, Turkey
- Coordinates: 38.1976°N 27.2395°E
- System: TCDD regional rail station İZBAN commuter rail station
- Owner: Turkish State Railways
- Operator: TCDD Transport; İZBAN A.Ş.
- Line: İzmir-Eğirdir railway
- Platforms: 2 island platforms
- Tracks: 4
- Connections: ESHOT Bus: 692, 701, 707, 709, 712

Construction
- Structure type: At-grade
- Accessible: Yes

History
- Opened: December 1860; 165 years ago February 6, 2016; 10 years ago
- Rebuilt: 2015–2016; 10 years ago
- Electrified: 2016; 10 years ago (25 kV AC)

Services
Preceding station	TCDD Taşımacılık	Following station
Cumaovası towards İzmir (Basmane)	İzmir–Denizli	Torbalı towards Denizli
Cumaovası towards İzmir (Basmane)	İzmir–Nazilli	Torbalı towards Nazilli
Cumaovası towards İzmir (Basmane)	İzmir–Söke	Torbalı towards Söke
Cumaovası towards İzmir (Basmane)	İzmir–Ödemiş	Torbalı towards Ödemiş Şehir
Cumaovası towards İzmir (Basmane)	İzmir–Tire	Torbalı towards Tire
Preceding station	İZBAN	Following station
Tekeli towards Aliağa	Aliağa-Tepeköy (Late nights)	Kuşçuburun towards Tepeköy
Tekeli towards Menemen	Menemen-Tepeköy	Kuşçuburun towards Tepeköy
Location

Pancar railway station is a railway station in Pancar, Turkey of the İZBAN commuter rail system. It is also serviced by regional trains operating out of Basmane Terminal in İzmir to destinations south.

The station was built in 1860 by the Oriental Railway Company and taken over by the Turkish State Railways in 1935. Between 2015 and 2016 it was rebuilt and expanded to accommodate the extension of the İZBAN to Tepeköy.

== Connections ==
ESHOT operates city bus service to the station.

ESHOT Bus service
Route number	Stop	Route	Location
692	Pancar Aktarma	Karakuyu — Pancar Aktarma	Kazım Karabekir Street
701	Pancar Aktarma	Torbalı — Tekeli	Kazım Karabekir Street
707	Pancar Aktarma	Pancar Aktarma Merkezi — Menderes	Kazım Karabekir Street
709	Pancar Aktarma	Demirci — Pancar Aktarma Merkezi	Kazım Karabekir Street
712	Pancar Aktarma	Pancar Aktarma — Torbalı	Kazım Karabekir Street
