= Tekeli railway station =

Railway station in İzmir, Turkey

Tekeli
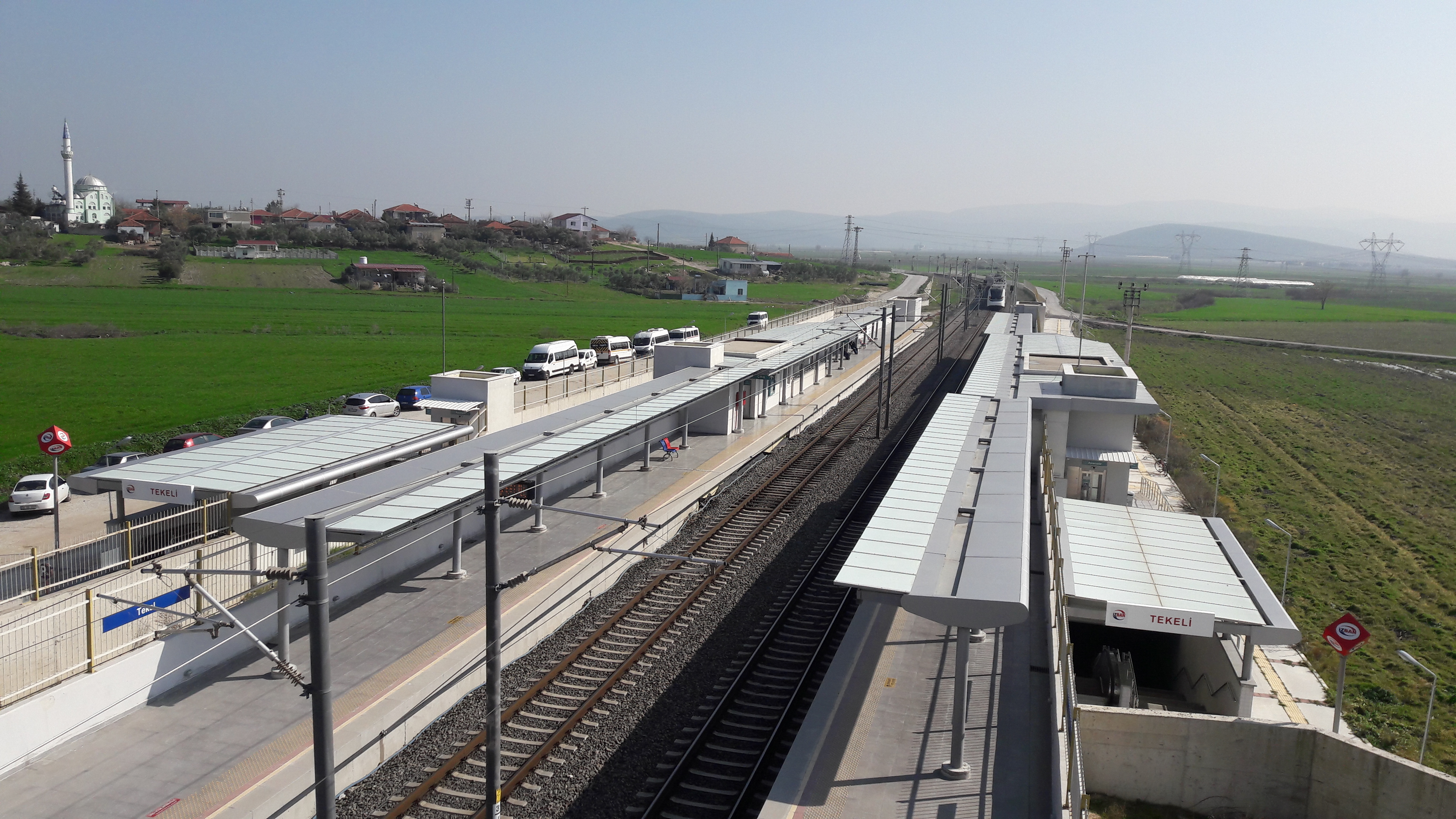

General information
- Location: Sakarya Sok., Tekeli Atatürk Mah. 35477, Menderes, Turkey
- Coordinates: 38.1814°N 27.1849°E
- System: İZBAN commuter rail station
- Owner: Turkish State Railways
- Operator: TCDD Transport; İZBAN A.Ş.
- Line: İzmir-Eğirdir railway
- Platforms: 1 island platform
- Tracks: 2
- Connections: ESHOT Bus: 701, 729, 792

Construction
- Structure type: At-grade
- Accessible: Yes

History
- Opened: February 6, 2016
- Electrified: 25 kV AC

Services
Preceding station	İZBAN	Following station
Develi towards Aliağa	Aliağa-Tepeköy (Late nights)	Pancar towards Tepeköy
Develi towards Menemen	Menemen-Tepeköy	Pancar towards Tepeköy
Location

Tekeli railway station is a railway station of the IZBAN commuter rail system, just south of Tekeli, Turkey. The station was built between 2014–15 and opened to passenger service on February 6, 2016.

== Connections ==
ESHOT operates regional bus service, accessible from the station.

ESHOT Bus service
Route number	Stop	Route	Location
701	Tekeli İstasyon	Torbalı — Tekeli	Sakarya Street
729	Tekeli İstasyon	Ataköy — Cumaovası Aktarma Merkezi	Sakarya Street
792	Tekeli İstasyon	Gölova — Cumaovası Aktarma Merkezi	Sakarya Street
