= Develi railway station =

Develi
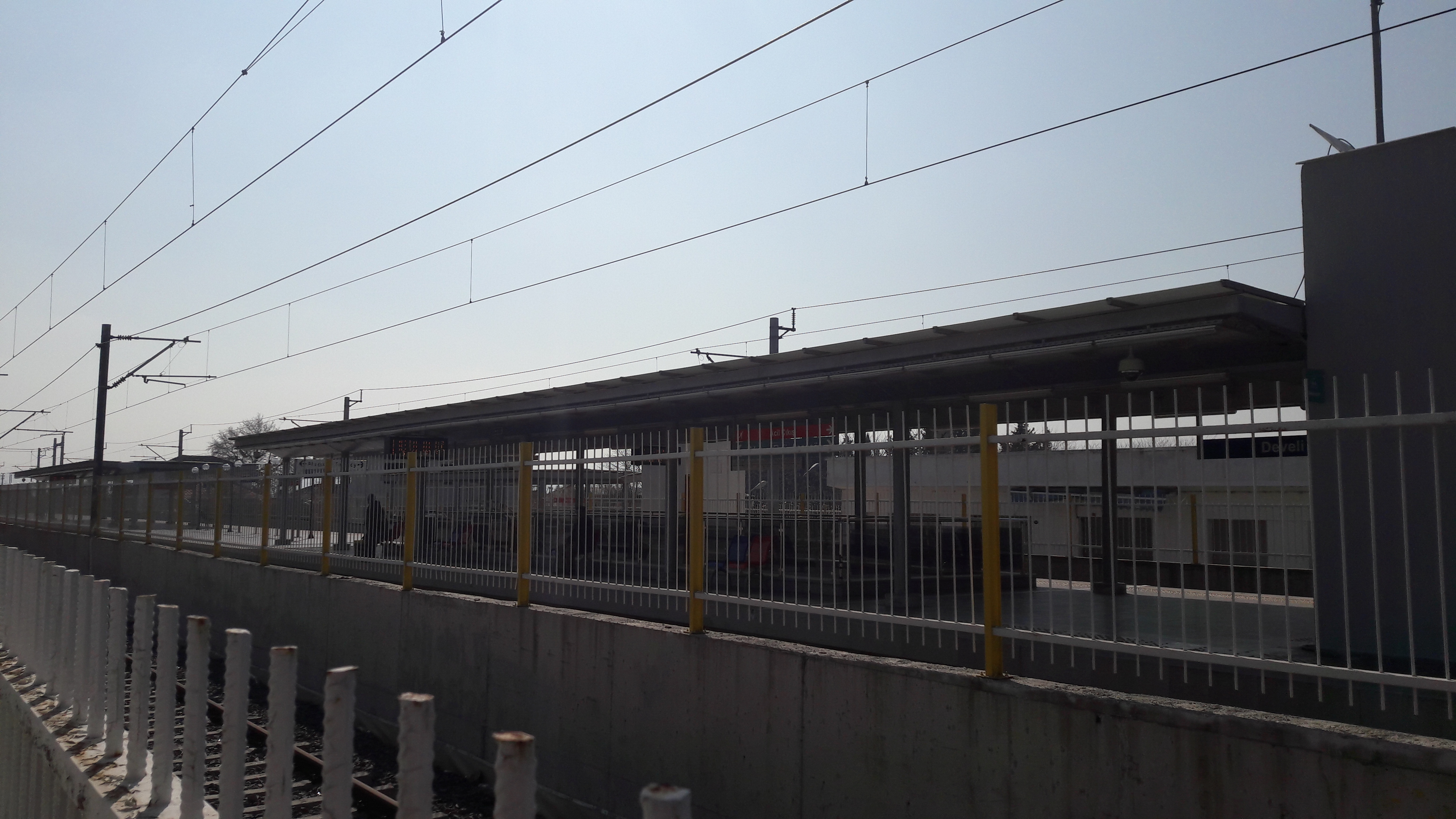

General information
- Location: Turkey
- Coordinates: 38.203201°N 27.166922°E
- System: İZBAN commuter rail station
- Owner: Turkish State Railways
- Operator: TCDD Transport; İZBAN A.Ş.
- Line: İzmir-Eğirdir railway
- Platforms: 1 island platform
- Tracks: 3

Construction
- Structure type: At-grade
- Accessible: yes

Other information
- Status: Open

History
- Opened: July 1, 1866; February 6, 2016
- Rebuilt: 2013-15
- Electrified: 2016

Services
Preceding station	İZBAN	Following station
Cumaovası towards Aliağa	Aliağa-Tepeköy (Late nights)	Tekeli towards Tepeköy
Cumaovası towards Menemen	Menemen-Tepeköy	Tekeli towards Tepeköy
Location

Develi station (Turkish: Develi istasyonu) is on the Southern Line of the IZBAN commuter rail system. The station was originally built in 1866 by the Oriental Railway Company and taken over by the Turkish State Railways in 1935. Develi was serviced by regional and inter-city trains from Izmir until 2016, when the İZBAN was extended from Cumaovası to Tepeköy. Currently all TCDD trains skip the station.

== Gallery ==
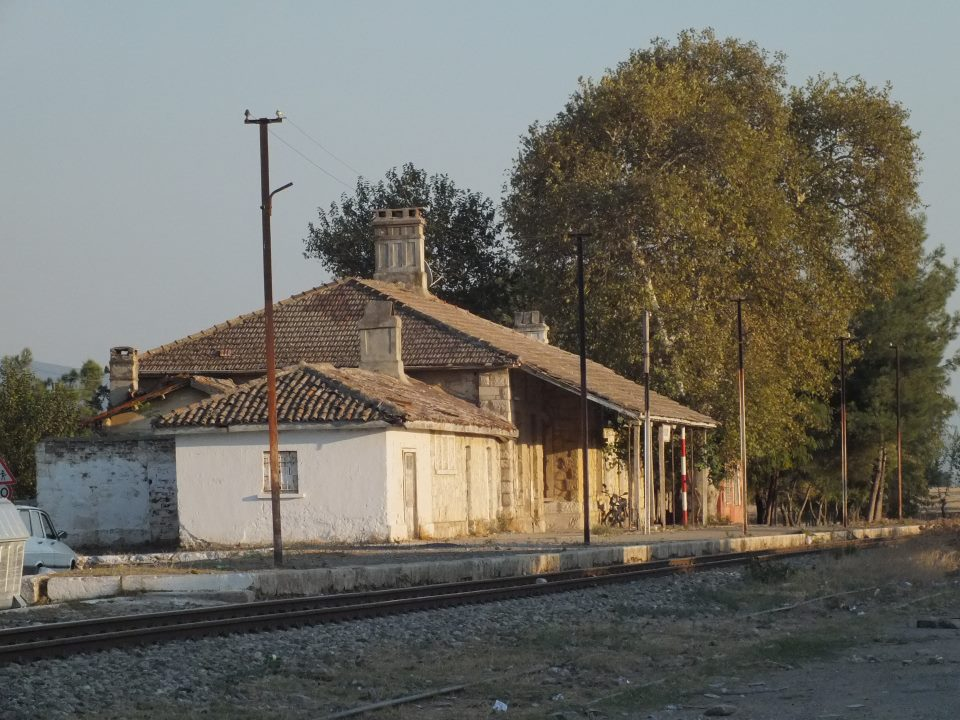
Develiköy station in 2011, before construction of the İZBAN platform.
