= Kuşçuburun railway station =

Railway station in İzmir

Kuşçuburun
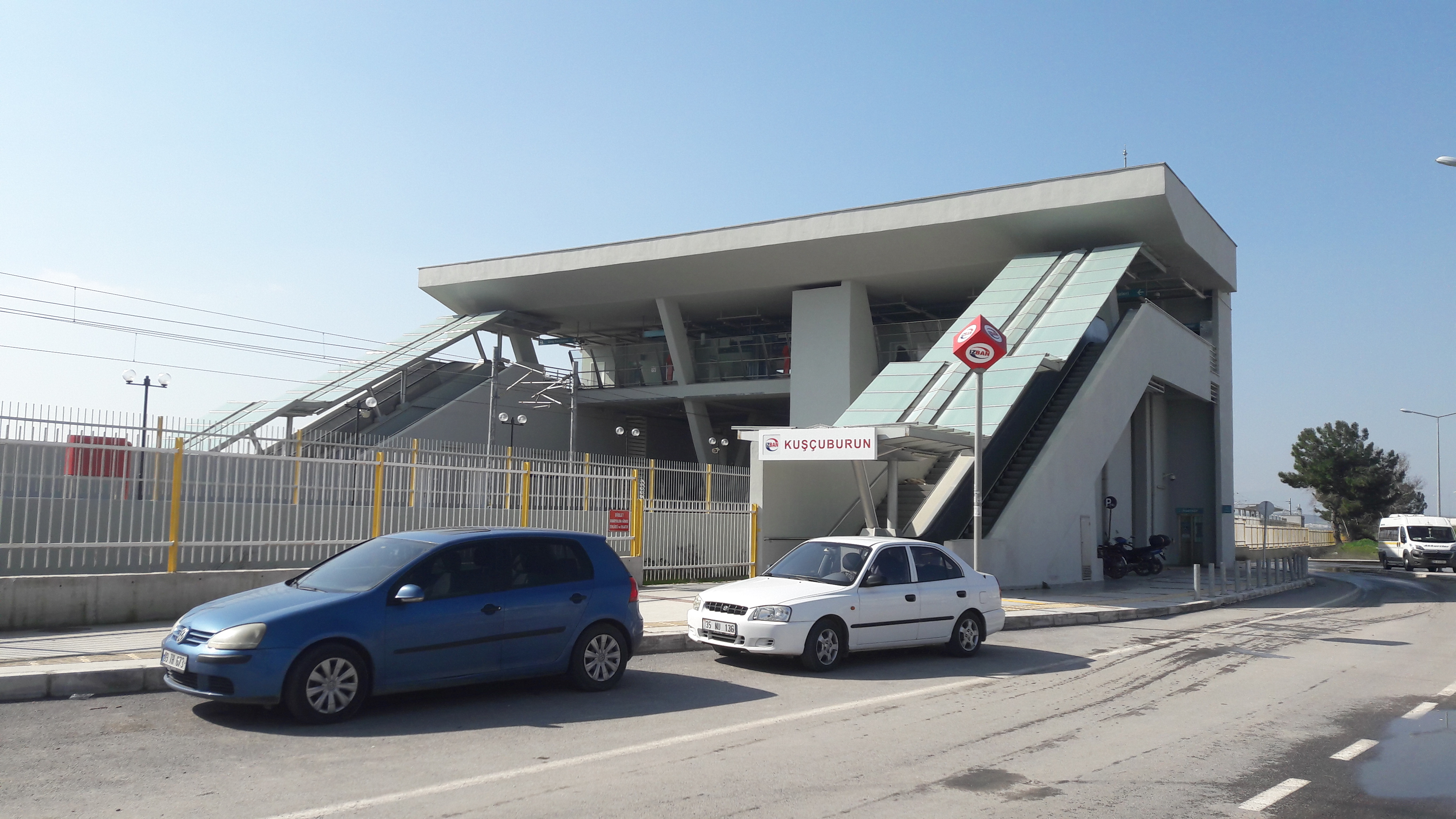
- The station mezzanine.

General information
- Location: Mimarbaşı Sinan Cd., Kuşçuburun Mah. 35860, Torbalı, Turkey
- Coordinates: 38.2088°N 27.3108°E
- System: İZBAN commuter rail station
- Owner: Turkish State Railways
- Line: İzmir-Eğirdir railway
- Platforms: 1 island platform
- Tracks: 2
- Connections: ESHOT Bus: 710

Construction
- Structure type: At-grade
- Accessible: Yes

History
- Opened: February 6, 2016
- Electrified: 25 kV AC

Services
| Preceding station | İZBAN | Following station |
|---|---|---|
| Pancar towards Aliağa | Aliağa-Tepeköy (Late nights) | Torbalı towards Tepeköy |
| Pancar towards Menemen | Menemen-Tepeköy | Torbalı towards Tepeköy |
Location

Kuşçuburun railway station is a railway station on the IZBAN commuter rail system just southeast of Kuşçuburun, Turkey. The station was opened on February 6, 2016, with commuter trains from Aliağa and Menemen in İzmir to Tepeköy.

== Connections ==
ESHOT operates city bus service to the station.

ESHOT Bus service
| Route number | Stop | Route | Location |
|---|---|---|---|
| 710 | Kuşçuburun Aktarma | Yazıbaşı — Kuşçuburun Aktarma | İskele Avenue |
