= Belevi railway station =

Railway station in Selçuk, İzmir, Turkey

Belevi

General information
- Location: Belevi Mah. 35920, Selçuk, İzmir, Turkey
- Coordinates: 38°01′50.9″N 27°25′59.6″E
- System: İZBAN commuter rail station
- Owner: Turkish State Railways
- Operator: TCDD Transport; İZBAN A.Ş.
- Line: İzmir-Eğirdir railway
- Platforms: 2 side platforms
- Tracks: 2
- Connections: ESHOT Bus: 743, 783

Construction
- Structure type: At-grade
- Accessible: Yes

History
- Opened: April 8, 2019

Services
Preceding station	İZBAN	Following station
Sağlık towards Tepeköy	Tepeköy-Selçuk	Selçuk Terminus
Location

Belevi railway station is a railway station in the town of Belevi in Selçuk, Turkey. It was built between 2017 and 2019 as part of the Selçuk extension of the IZBAN commuter rail system. On April 8, 2019, the station started to serve passengers.

== Connections ==
ESHOT Bus service
Route number	Stop	Route
743	Belevi İstasyon	Tire — Selçuk
783	Belevi İstasyon	Belevi — Torbalı
