= Sağlık railway station =

Railway station

Sağlık

General information
- Location: 6353 Sk., Sağlık Köyü 35860, Torbalı, Izmir
- Coordinates: 37.0849°N 27.4001°E
- Owner: Turkish State Railways
- Operator: TCDD Transport; İZBAN A.Ş.
- Line: İzmir-Eğirdir railway
- Platforms: 2 side platforms
- Tracks: 2
- Connections: ESHOT Bus: 783

Construction
- Accessible: Yes

History
- Opened: September 1862; September 8, 2017
- Rebuilt: 2015-17

Services
Preceding station	İZBAN	Following station
Tepeköy Terminus	Tepeköy-Selçuk	Belevi towards Selçuk
Location

Sağlık railway station is a railway station in the village of Sağlık, Turkey. The station used to be serviced by the Turkish State Railways but is now a part of the İZBAN extension to Selçuk. The station was originally built in 1862 by the Ottoman Railway Company and taken over by the state railways in 1935. Sağlık reopened on 8 September 2017 along with the Selçuk extension of İZBAN commuter rail system.

== Connections ==
ESHOT Bus service
Route number	Stop	Route	Location
783	Sağlık Son Durak	Belevi — Torbalı	6350th Street
