= Basmane-Aliağa Regional =

Overview
- Service type: Regional rail
- Status: Discontinued
- Locale: İzmir Province
- First service: 1996
- Last service: 2006
- Successor: Northern Line
- Former operator(s): Turkish State Railways

Route
- Termini: Basmane; Aliağa
- Stops: 18
- Distance travelled: 53 km (32.93 mi)
- Average journey time: 1h 30m
- Service frequency: Twice daily

On-board services
- Seating arrangements: Coach

Technical
- Rolling stock: MT5700
- Track gauge: 1,435 mm (4 ft 8 1/2 in) standard gauge
- Operating speed: 65 km/h (40 mph)
- Track owner(s): Turkish State Railways

The Basmane-Aliağa Regional (Turkish: Basmane-Aliağa Bölgesel) was a regional rail service from Basmane Terminal in İzmir to the port town of Aliağa in Turkey. The service started in 1996, when the State Railways completed the branch line from Menemen to Aliağa. Trains stopped at all local stops in northern İzmir. The service was the predecessor of the new İZBAN Line. The service was discontinued in July 2006.
