= Torbalı railway station =

Railway station in İzmir

Torbalı
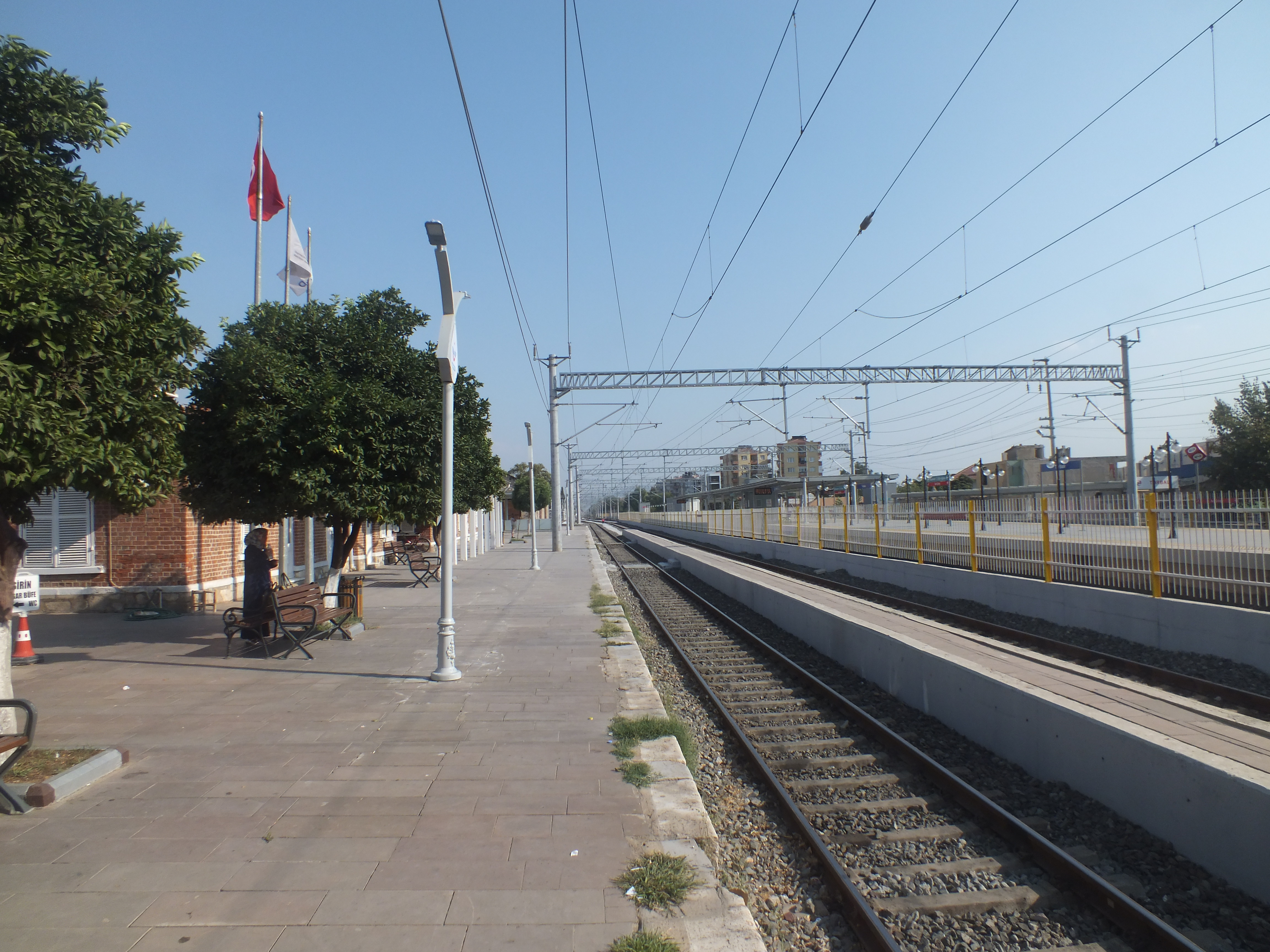
- The TCDD platform on the left with the new IZBAN platform on the right.

General information
- Location: 5058. Sk, Torbalı Mah. 35860; Torbalı, İzmir; Turkey
- Coordinates: 38.1708°N 27.3475°E
- System: TCDD Taşımacılık regional rail station İZBAN commuter rail station
- Owner: Turkish State Railways
- Operator: TCDD Transport; İZBAN A.Ş.
- Lines: İzmir-Eğirdir railway Torbalı-Ödemiş railway
- Platforms: 3
- Tracks: 5
- Connections: ESHOT Bus: Haluk Alpsu Bulvarı: 701, 722; Torbalı Aktarma: 714, 715, 724, 727, 770, 780, 781, 782, 798

Construction
- Structure type: At-grade
- Platform levels: 1
- Accessible: Yes

Other information
- Status: In Operation

History
- Opened: December 1860; 165 years ago February 6, 2016; 10 years ago
- Rebuilt: 2013–2015; 11 years ago
- Electrified: 2015; 11 years ago 25 kV AC
- Former names: ORC

Services
Preceding station	TCDD Taşımacılık	Following station
Pancar towards İzmir (Basmane)	İzmir–Denizli	Tepeköy towards Denizli
Pancar towards İzmir (Basmane)	İzmir–Nazilli	Tepeköy towards Nazilli
Pancar towards İzmir (Basmane)	İzmir–Söke	Tepeköy towards Söke
Pancar towards İzmir (Basmane)	İzmir–Ödemiş	Gürgün towards Ödemiş Şehir
Pancar towards İzmir (Basmane)	İzmir–Tire	Arıkbaşı towards Tire
Preceding station	İZBAN	Following station
Kuşçuburun towards Aliağa	Aliağa-Tepeköy (Late nights)	Tepeköy Terminus
Kuşçuburun towards Menemen	Menemen-Tepeköy	Tepeköy Terminus
Location

Torbalı railway station (Turkish: Torbalı garı) is the larger and busier of the two railway stations in the town of Torbalı, Turkey.

Torbalı has three platforms (2 island platforms, 1 side platform) servicing TCDD regional trains as well as IZBAN commuter trains.

Just south of the station is Torbalı junction, where the Torbalı-Ödemiş railway splits off the İzmir–Eğirdir railway.

== Connections ==
Torbalı is serviced by several bus services that operate to neighboring towns and villages. The stop is located besides Haluk Alpsu Boulevard.

ESHOT Bus service
Route number	Stop	Route	Location
701	Haluk Alpsu Bulvarı	Torbalı — Tekeli	Haluk Alpsu Boulevard
714	Torbalı Aktarma	DEÜ Meslek Yüksek Okulu — Torbalı Aktarma Merkezi	Torbalı Terminal
715	Torbalı Aktarma	DEÜ Meslek Yüksek Okulu — Torbalı Aktarma Merkezi	Torbalı Terminal
722	Haluk Alpsu Bulvarı	Çapak — Torbalı	Haluk Alpsu Boulevard
724	Torbalı Aktarma	Şehitler — Torbalı Aktarma Merkezi	Torbalı Terminal
727	Torbalı Aktarma	Bayındır — Torbalı Aktarma Merkezi	Torbalı Terminal
770	Torbalı Aktarma	Selçuk — Torbalı Aktarma Merkezi	Torbalı Terminal
780	Torbalı Aktarma	Bülbüldere — Torbalı Aktarma Merkezi	Torbalı Terminal
781	Torbalı Aktarma	Tulumköy — Torbalı Aktarma Merkezi	Torbalı Terminal
782	Torbalı Aktarma	Taşkesik — Torbalı Aktarma Merkezi	Torbalı Terminal
798	Torbalı Aktarma	Tire — Torbalı Aktarma Merkezi	Torbalı Terminal

== Gallery ==
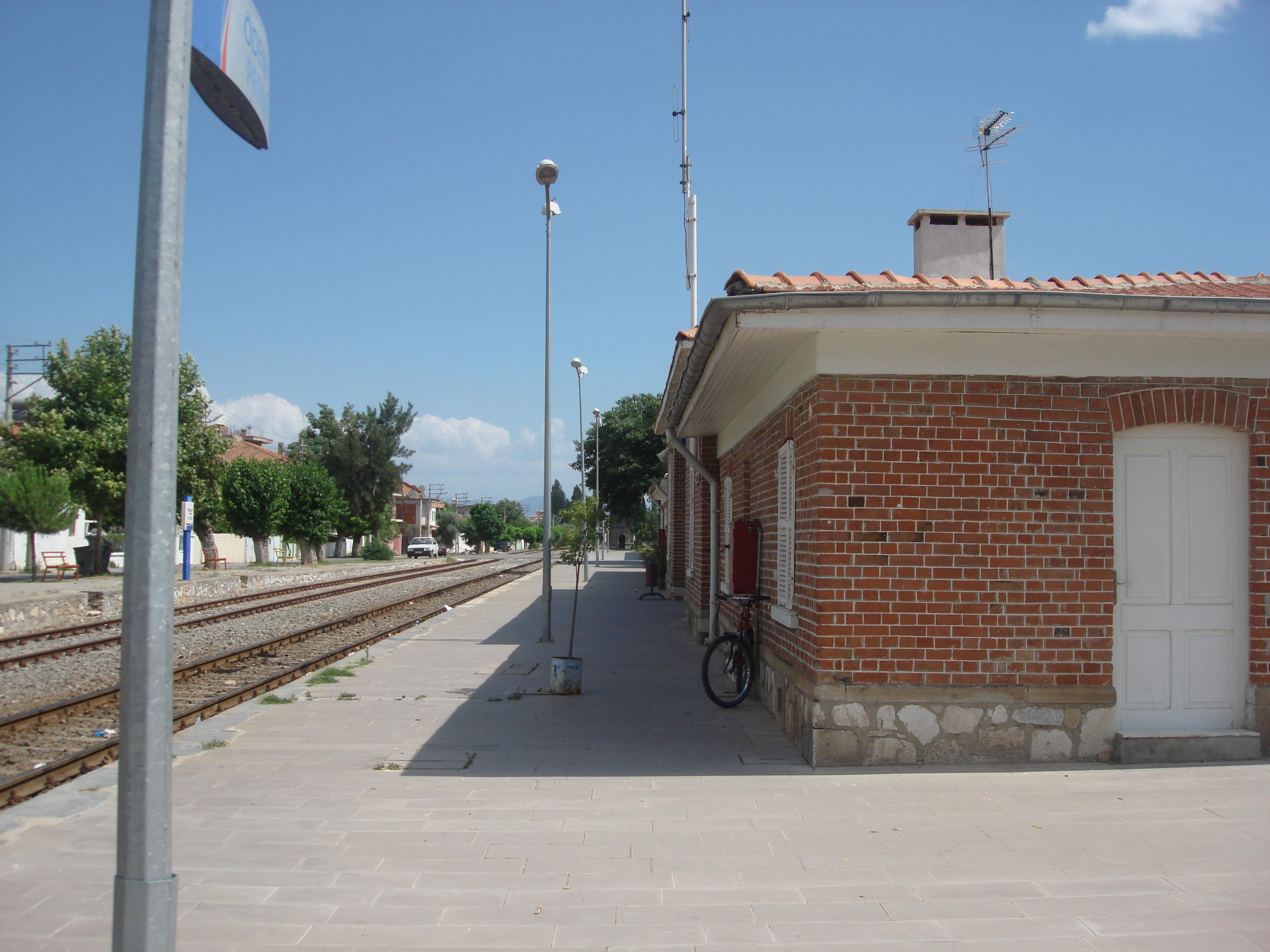
The tracks to Ödemiş and Tire.

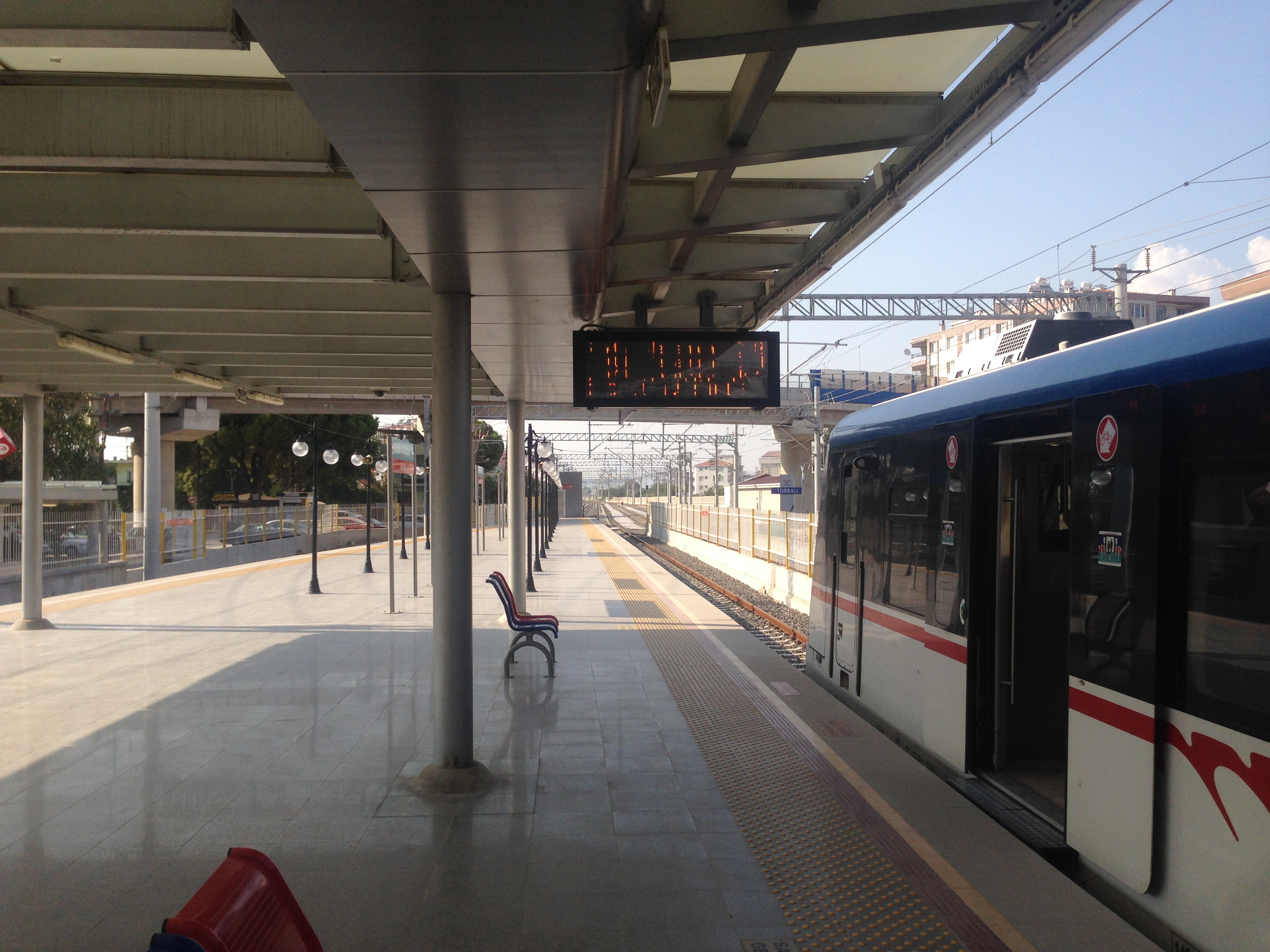
The İZBAN platform.
