= Cumaovası railway station =

Railway station in Turkey

Cumaovası
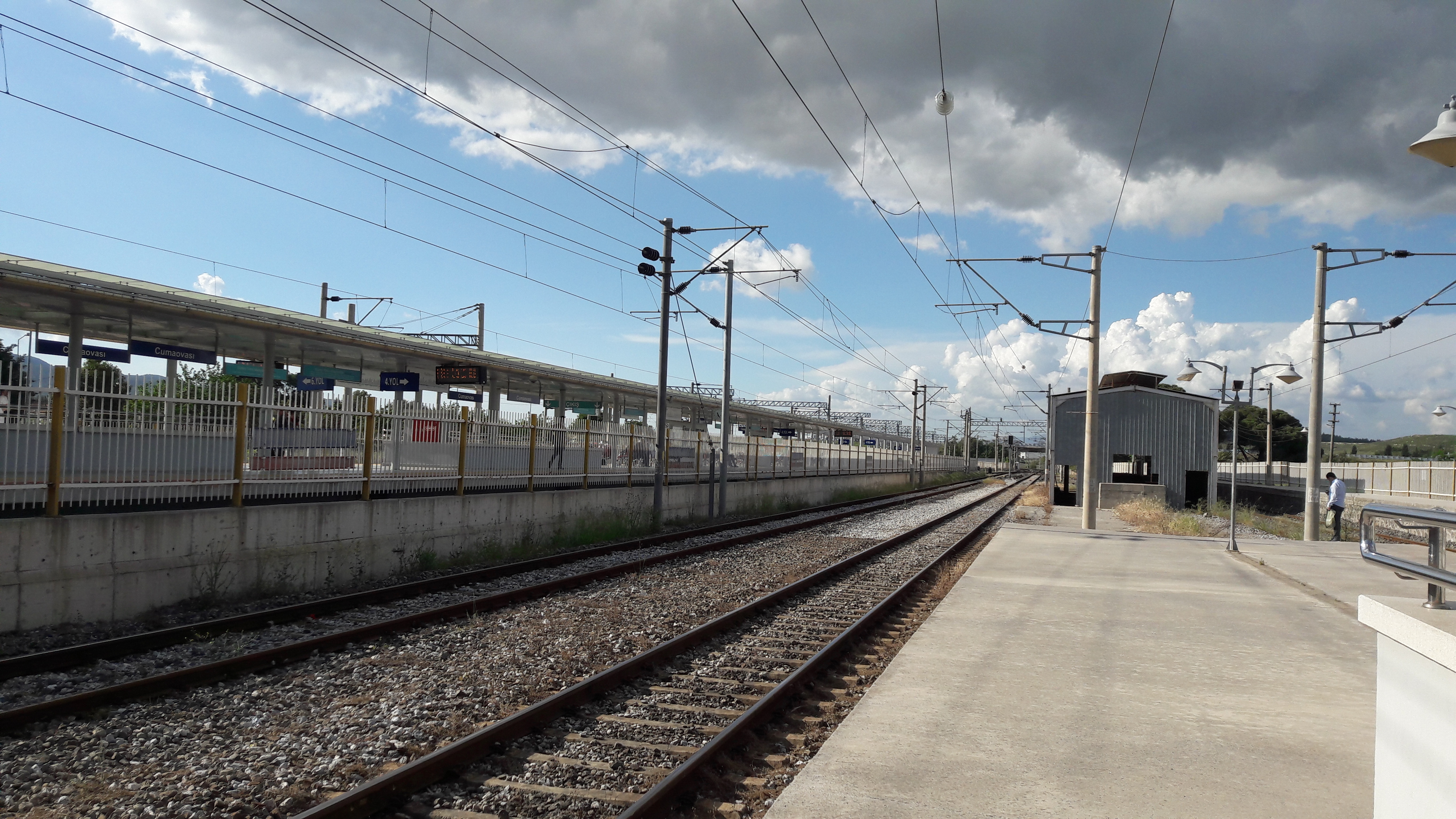
- The İZBAN platform on the left and the TCDDT platform on the right.

General information
- Location: Cumaovası Caddesi, Cumaovası
- Coordinates: 38.2637°N 27.1630°E
- System: TCDD regional rail and İZBAN commuter rail station
- Owner: Turkish State Railways
- Operator: TCDD Transport; İZBAN A.Ş.
- Line: İzmir-Eğirdir railway
- Platforms: 2
- Tracks: 4
- Connections: ESHOT Bus: 729, 775, 776, 789, 792, 794, 799, 804, 808, 814, 829

Construction
- Structure type: At-grade
- Accessible: Yes

History
- Opened: 1860; 166 years ago
- Rebuilt: 2006; 20 years ago
- Electrified: 2001; 25 years ago 25 kV AC
- Former names: Menderes

Services
Preceding station	TCDD Taşımacılık	Following station
Havalimanı towards İzmir (Basmane)	İzmir–Denizli	Pancar towards Denizli
Havalimanı towards İzmir (Basmane)	İzmir–Nazilli	Pancar towards Nazilli
Havalimanı towards İzmir (Basmane)	İzmir–Söke	Pancar towards Söke
Havalimanı towards İzmir (Basmane)	İzmir–Ödemiş	Pancar towards Ödemiş Şehir
Havalimanı towards İzmir (Basmane)	İzmir–Tire	Pancar towards Tire
Preceding station	İZBAN	Following station
Havalimanı towards Aliağa	Aliağa-Cumaovası	Terminus
Havalimanı towards Aliağa	Aliağa-Tepeköy (Late nights)	Develi towards Tepeköy
Havalimanı towards Menemen	Menemen-Tepeköy	Develi towards Tepeköy
Location

The Cumaovası railway station (Turkish: Cumaovası garı) is a railway station in Turkey. The station was originally built in 1860 by the Oriental Railway Company and taken over by the Turkish State Railways in 1935. The station is 2.78 km (1.73 mi) from the town of Menderes. The Turkish State Railways serve the station with regional trains to Basmane station in İzmir and Ödemiş, Tire, Aydın, Nazilli and Söke in the south. Cumaovası station also serves the İZBAN trains. There is a transfer from ESHOT buses.

Cumaovası Yard is a small rail yard located next to the station and is one of İZBAN's two main depots along with the Çiğli Maintenance Facility.

== Connections ==
ESHOT operates regional bus service, accessible from the station.

ESHOT Bus service
Route number	Stop	Route	Location
729	Cumaovası Aktarma Merkezi	Ataköy — Cumaovası Aktarma Merkezi	Cumaovası Terminal
775	Cumaovası Aktarma Merkezi	Özdere — Cumaovası Aktarma Merkezi	Cumaovası Terminal
776	Cumaovası Aktarma Merkezi	Doğanbey — Cumaovası Aktarma Merkezi	Cumaovası Terminal
789	Cumaovası Aktarma Merkezi	Efemçukuru — Cumaovası Aktarma Merkezi	Cumaovası Terminal
792	Cumaovası Aktarma Merkezi	Gölova — Cumaovası Aktarma Merkezi	Cumaovası Terminal
794	Cumaovası Aktarma Merkezi	Küner — Cumaovası Aktarma Merkezi	Cumaovası Terminal
799	Cumaovası Aktarma Merkezi	Çatalca — Cumaovası Aktarma	Cumaovası Terminal
804	Cumaovası Aktarma Merkezi	Dereköy — Cumaovası Aktarma Merkezi	Cumaovası Terminal
808	Cumaovası Aktarma Merkezi	Cumaovası Aktarma Merkezi — Esbaş Aktarma Merkezi	Cumaovası Terminal
814	Cumaovası Aktarma Merkezi	Menderes — Cumaovası Aktarma Merkezi	Cumaovası Terminal
829	Cumaovası Aktarma Merkezi	Ürkmez — Cumaovası Aktarma	Cumaovası Terminal
