= Tepeköy railway station =

Railway station in İzmir, Turkey

Tepeköy
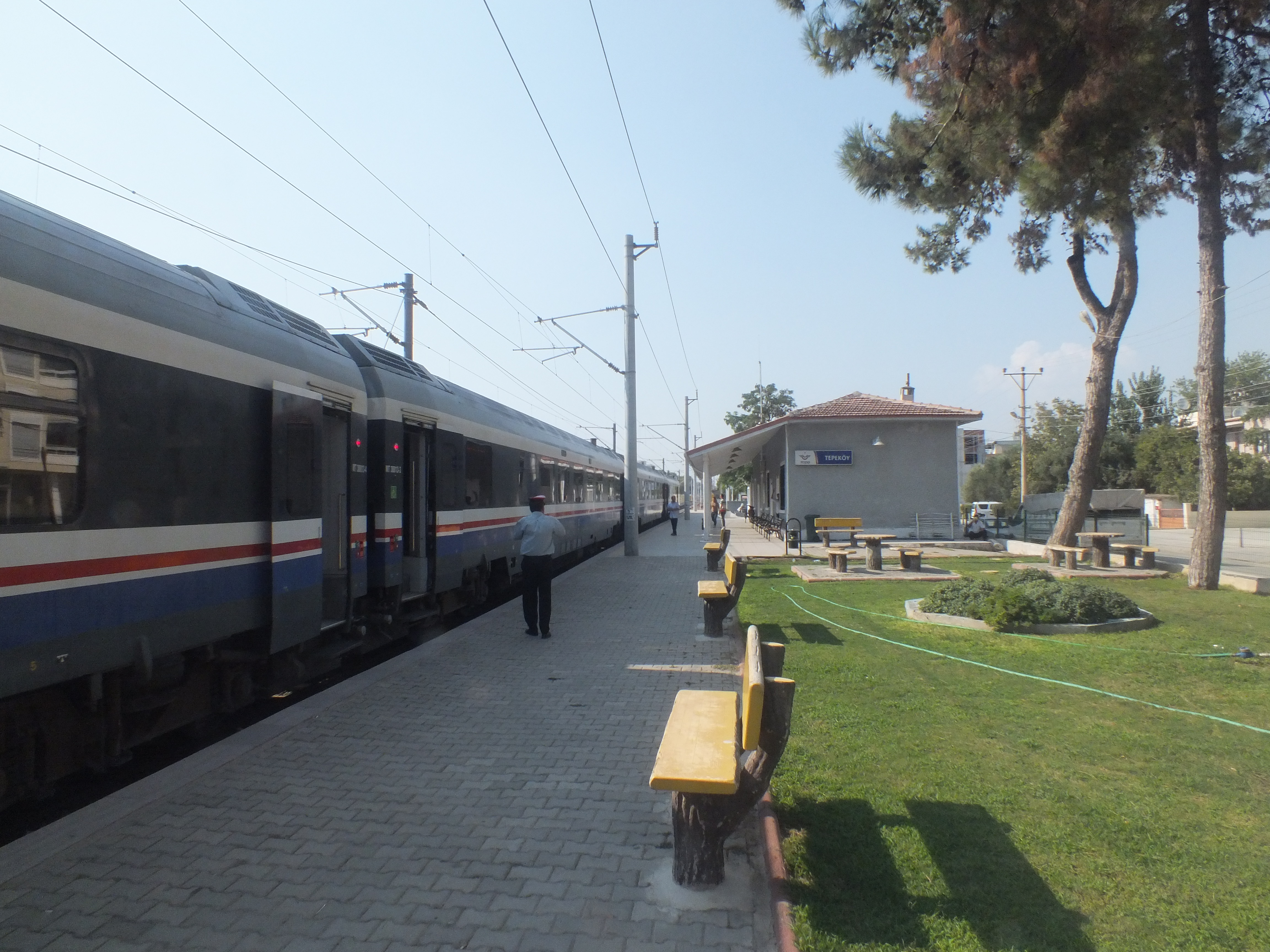
- A Denizli bound regional train on track 1.

General information
- Location: 4550 Sokak, Tepeköy Mahallesi, Torbali 35860
- System: TCDD Taşımacılık regional rail İZBAN commuter rail station
- Owner: Turkish State Railways
- Operator: TCDD Transport; İZBAN A.Ş.
- Line: İzmir-Eğirdir railway
- Platforms: 2
- Tracks: 3
- Connections: ESHOT Bus: 701, 712, 713, 714, 719, 721, 722, 724, 763, 770, 780, 781, 782, 783, 784, 785, 786, 795, 798

Construction
- Accessible: Yes

History
- Opened: November 14, 1861; 164 years ago February 6, 2016; 10 years ago
- Electrified: 2016; 10 years ago

Services
| Preceding station | TCDD Taşımacılık | Following station |
|---|---|---|
| Torbalı towards İzmir (Basmane) | İzmir–Denizli | Selçuk towards Denizli |
| Torbalı towards İzmir (Basmane) | İzmir–Nazilli | Selçuk towards Nazilli |
| Torbalı towards İzmir (Basmane) | İzmir–Söke | Selçuk towards Söke |
| Preceding station | İZBAN | Following station |
| Torbalı towards Aliağa | Aliağa-Tepeköy (Late nights) | Terminus |
| Torbalı towards Menemen | Menemen-Tepeköy | Terminus |
| Terminus | Tepeköy-Selçuk | Sağlık towards Selçuk |
Location

Tepeköy railway station is a railway station in Torbalı and is the southern terminus for Aliağa and Menemen outbound trains of the İZBAN. The station was originally opened on 14 November 1861 by the Oriental Railway Company. Between 2015 and 2016, Tepeköy was rebuilt and expanded from a one track station to three tracks to service commuter trains (İZBAN).

A low-level side platform serves one track with 16 daily regional trains running between Basmane Terminal in İzmir and destinations southeast and a high-level island platform serves two tracks for İZBAN commuter trains to Aliağa, Menemen and Selçuk.

Since 8 September 2017, Tepeköy serves as a transfer station between İZBAN trains from Aliağa, Menemen and from Selçuk Trains from Aliağa and Menemen terminate at the station along with trains from Selçuk.

== Connections ==
Tepeköy is serviced by several bus services that operate to neighboring towns and villages. The stop is located on 4550th Street.

ESHOT Bus service
| Route number | Stop | Route | Location |
|---|---|---|---|
| 701 | Tepeköy Aktarma | Torbalı — Tekeli | 4550th Street |
| 712 | Tepeköy Aktarma | Pancar Aktarma — Torbalı | 4550th Street |
| 713 | Tepeköy Aktarma | DEÜ Meslek Yüksek Okulu — Torbalı | 4550th Street |
| 714 | Tepeköy Aktarma | DEÜ Meslek Yüksek Okulu — Torbalı Aktarma Merkezi | 4550th Street |
| 719 | Tepeköy Aktarma | Çapak — Torbalı | 4550th Street |
| 721 | Tepeköy Aktarma | Karakuyu — Torbalı | 4550th Street |
| 722 | Tepeköy Aktarma | Yazıbaşı — Torbalı | 4550th Street |
| 724 | Tepeköy Aktarma | Şehitler — Torbalı Aktarma Merkezi | 4550th Street |
| 763 | Tepeköy Aktarma | Düverlik — Torbalı Aktarma Merkezi | 4550th Street |
| 770 | Tepeköy Aktarma | Selçuk — Torbalı Aktarma Merkezi | 4550th Street |
| 780 | Tepeköy Aktarma | Bülbüldere — Torbalı Aktarma Merkezi | 4550th Street |
| 781 | Tepeköy Aktarma | Tulumköy — Torbalı Aktarma Merkezi | 4550th Street |
| 782 | Tepeköy Aktarma | Taşkesik — Torbalı Aktarma Merkezi | 4550th Street |
| 783 | Tepeköy Aktarma | Belevi — Torbalı | 4550th Street |
| 784 | Tepeköy Aktarma | Doğancılar — Torbalı | 4550th Street |
| 785 | Tepeköy Aktarma | Dağtekke — Torbalı | 4550th Street |
| 786 | Tepeköy Aktarma | Karaot — Torbalı | 4550th Street |
| 795 | Tepeköy Aktarma | Ödemiş — Torbalı | 4550th Street |
| 798 | Tepeköy Aktarma | Tire — Torbalı Aktarma Merkezi | 4550th Street |
