= Saruhanlı railway station =

Railway station in Saruhanlı, Turkey

SARUHANLI
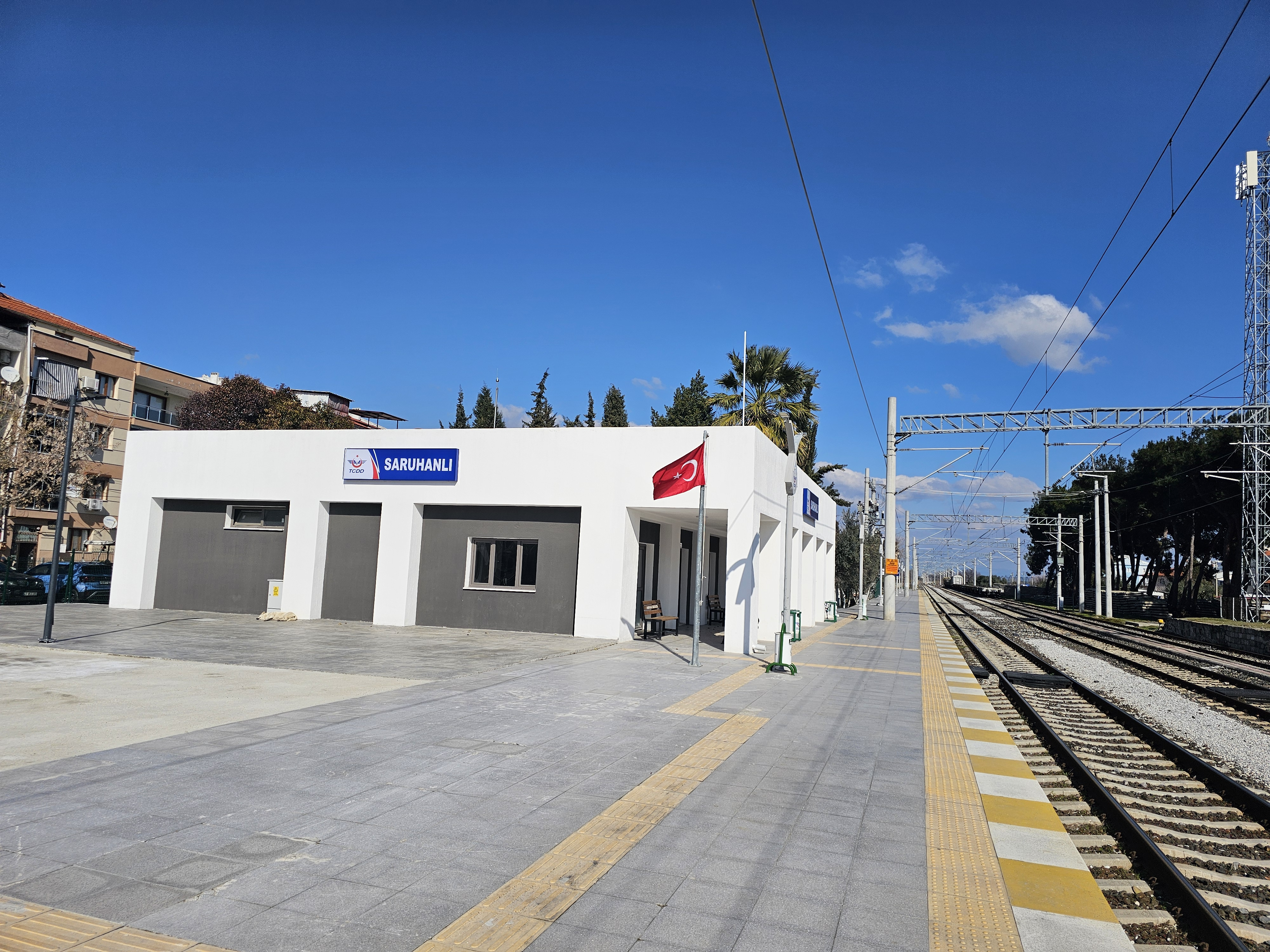

General information
- Location: Rüzgarlı Sk., Atatürk Mah. 45835; Saruhanlı, Manisa; Turkey
- Coordinates: 38.732853°N 27.577202°E
- Elevation: 40 m (130 ft)
- System: TCDD Transport inter-city rail station
- Owner: Turkish State Railways
- Operator: TCDD Transport
- Line: Manisa-Bandırma railway
- Distance: 84.6 km (52.6 mi) (İzmir)
- Platforms: 1 side platform
- Tracks: 3

Construction
- Structure type: At-grade
- Parking: No
- Accessible: Yes

Other information
- Status: In operation

History
- Opened: 1890
- Electrified: 2017 (25 kV AC, 50 Hz)
Services
Preceding station	TCDD Taşımacılık	Following station
Manisa towards İzmir (Basmane)	6 Sep Express	Akhisar towards Bandırma
Manisa towards İzmir (Basmane)	17 Sep Express	Akhisar towards Bandırma
Manisa towards İzmir (Basmane)	İzmir Blue Train	Akhisar towards Ankara
Karaağaçlı towards İzmir (Basmane)	Aegean Express	Hacırahmanlı towards Eskişehir
Location

Saruhanlı station is a station in Saruhanlı, Turkey. TCDD Taşımacılık operates four trains, both from İzmir, that stop at the station: the İzmir Blue Train to Ankara, the Aegean Express to Eskişehir and the 6th of September Express and the 17th of September Express to Bandırma.

The station was opened in 1890, by the Smyrna Cassaba Railway.
