= Kırkağaç railway station =

Railway station in Turkey

Kırkağaç
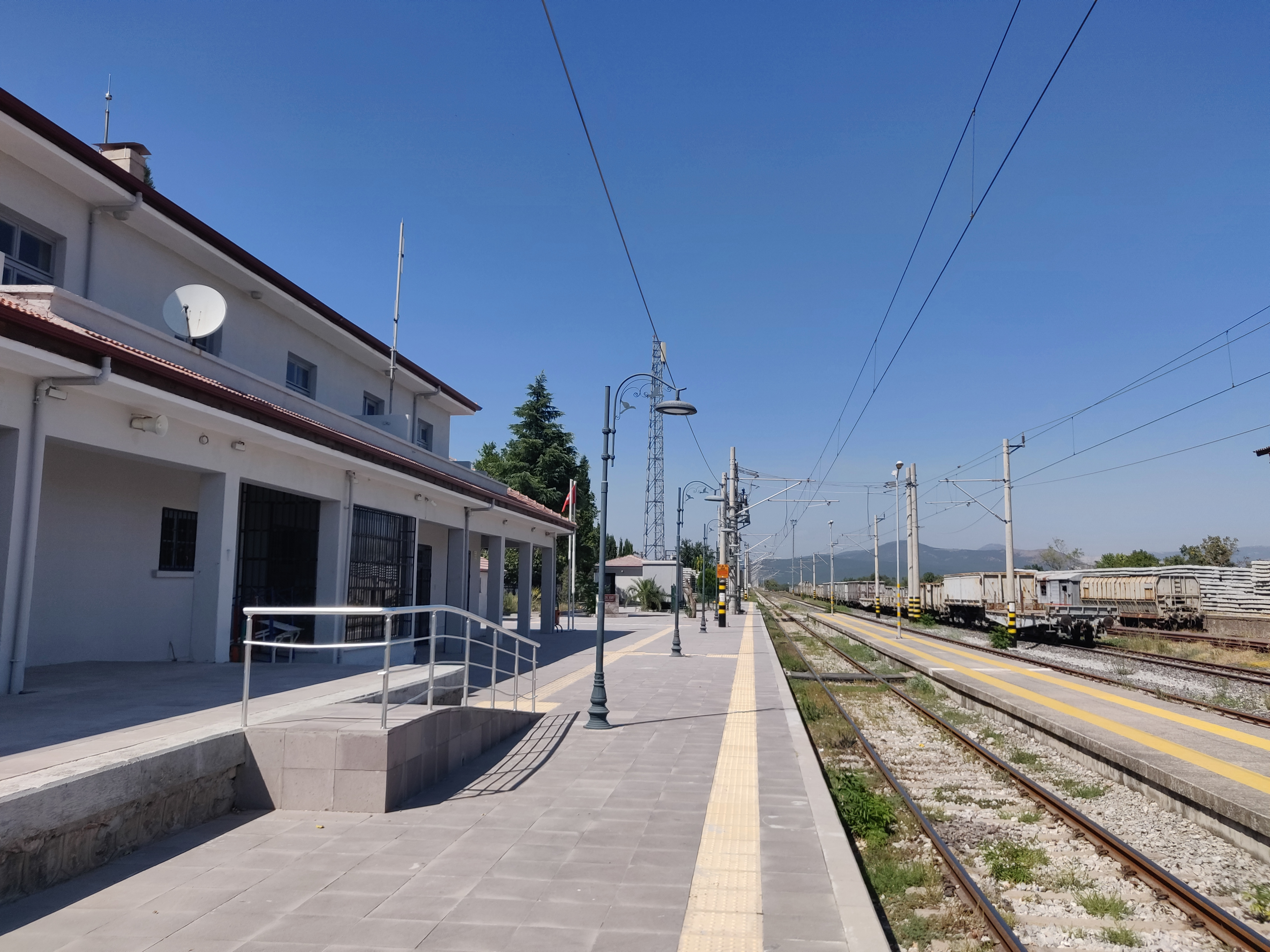

General information
- Location: 158 Sk., Şair Eşref Mah. 45700; Kırkağaç/Manisa; Turkey
- Coordinates: 39.1154°N 27.6857°E
- System: TCDD inter-city rail station
- Owner: Turkish State Railways
- Operator: TCDD Taşımacılık
- Line: Manisa-Bandırma railway
- Platforms: 2 (1 side platform, 1 island platform)
- Tracks: 2

Construction
- Structure type: At-grade

History
- Opened: 1890
- Electrified: 25 kV AC

Services
Preceding station	TCDD Taşımacılık	Following station
Akhisar towards İzmir (Basmane)	İzmir Blue Train	Soma towards Ankara
Akhisar towards İzmir (Basmane)	6 Sep Express	Soma towards Bandırma
Akhisar towards İzmir (Basmane)	17 Sep Express	Soma towards Bandırma
Bakır towards İzmir (Basmane)	Aegean Express	Soma towards Eskişehir
Location

Kırkağaç station is a railway station in Kırkağaç, Turkey. Located on the northeast periphery of the town, the station consists of one side platform and one island platform servicing two tracks, as well as a small freight depot. TCDD Taşımacılık operates four daily trains that stop at the station: the İzmir Blue Train, the Karesi Express, the 6th of September Express and the 17th of September Express.

The station was opened in 1890, by the Smyrna Cassaba Railway.
