= Kapaklı railway station =

Railway station in Turkey

KAPAKLI
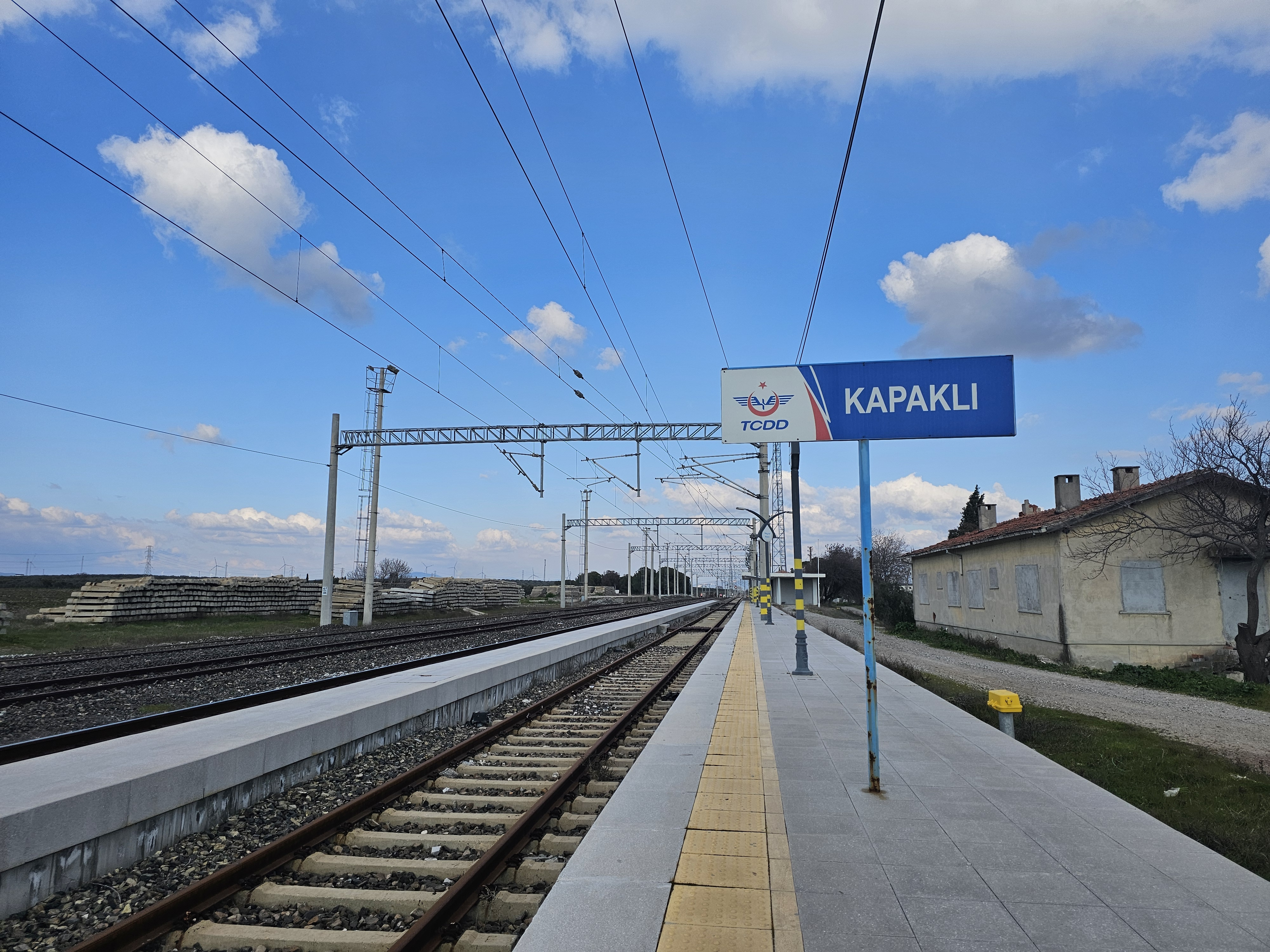

General information
- Location: Kapaklı Köyü, 45800; Akhisar, Manisa; Turkey
- Coordinates: 38.872027°N 27.744186°E
- Elevation: 85 m (279 ft)
- System: TCDD Transport inter-city rail station
- Owner: Turkish State Railways
- Operator: TCDD Transport
- Line: Manisa-Bandırma railway
- Distance: 107.5 km (66.8 mi) (İzmir)
- Platforms: 2 (1 side platform, 1 island platform)
- Tracks: 3

Construction
- Structure type: At-grade
- Parking: No
- Accessible: Yes

Other information
- Status: In operation

History
- Opened: 1890
- Electrified: 2017 (25 kV AC, 50 Hz)
Services
Preceding station	TCDD Taşımacılık	Following station
Kayışlar towards İzmir (Basmane)	Aegean Express	Akhisar towards Eskişehir
6 Sep Express does not stop here
17 Sep Express does not stop here
İzmir Blue Train does not stop here
Location

Kapaklı station is a station in Kapaklıi, Turkey. TCDD Taşımacılık operates a daily train, the Aegean Express, from İzmir to Eskişehir. Prior to a schedule change in December 2017, the Karesi Express, 6th of September Express and the 7th of September Express stopped at the station.

The station was opened in 1890, by the Smyrna Cassaba Railway.
