= İshakçelebi railway station =

İSHAKÇELEBİ
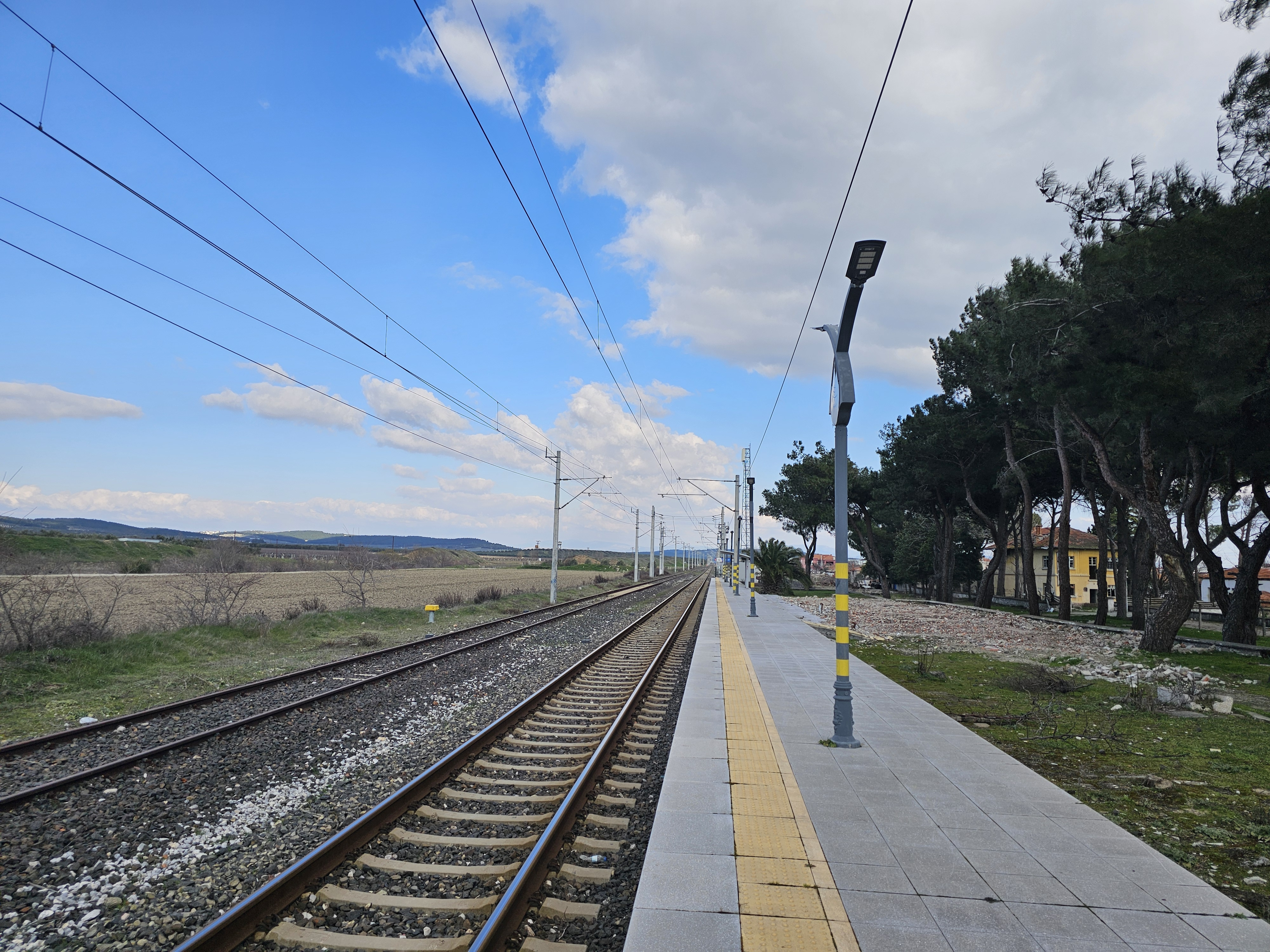

General information
- Location: İshakçelebi Köyü, 45820; Saruhanlı, Manisa; Turkey
- Coordinates: 38.747300°N 27.628348°E
- Elevation: 53 m (174 ft)
- System: TCDD Transport inter-city rail station
- Owner: Turkish State Railways
- Operator: TCDD Transport
- Line: Manisa-Bandırma railway
- Distance: 90.1 km (56.0 mi) (İzmir)
- Platforms: 1 side platform
- Tracks: 2

Construction
- Structure type: At-grade
- Parking: No
- Accessible: Yes

Other information
- Status: In operation

History
- Opened: 1890
- Electrified: 2017 (25 kV AC, 50 Hz)
Services
Preceding station	TCDD Taşımacılık	Following station
Hacırahmanlı towards İzmir (Basmane)	Aegean Express	Kayışlar towards Eskişehir
6 Sep Express does not stop here
17 Sep Express does not stop here
İzmir Blue Train does not stop here
Location

İshakçelebi railway station is a station in İshakçelebi, Turkey. TCDD Taşımacılık operates a daily intercity train, the Aegean Express, from İzmir to Eskişehir.

The station was opened in 1890 by the Smyrna Cassaba Railway.
