= Soğucak railway station =

Railway station in Turkey

Soğucak

General information
- Location: Soğucak Mah. 10580; Savaştepe/Balıkesir; Turkey
- Coordinates: 39.5139°N 27.6725°E
- System: TCDD intercity rail station
- Owner: Turkish State Railways
- Operator: TCDD Taşımacılık
- Line: İzmir Blue Train Karesi Express 6 Sep Express 17 Sep Express
- Platforms: 1 side platform
- Tracks: 3

Construction
- Structure type: At-grade
- Parking: Located in front of station building.

History
- Opened: 1912

Services
Preceding station	TCDD Taşımacılık	Following station
Savaştepe towards İzmir (Basmane)	6 Sep Express	Gökköy towards Bandırma
Savaştepe towards İzmir (Basmane)	17 Sep Express	Çukurhüseyin towards Bandırma
Savaştepe towards İzmir (Basmane)	Karesi Express	Balıkesir Terminus
Location

Soğucak station is a station just north of the village of Soğucak in the Balıkesir Province of Turkey. Three daily trains, operated by TCDD Taşımacılık, stop at the station. The station was originally built by the Smyrna Cassaba Railway in 1912 and sold to the Turkish State Railways in 1934.
