= Savaştepe railway station =

Railway station in Turkey

Savaştepe
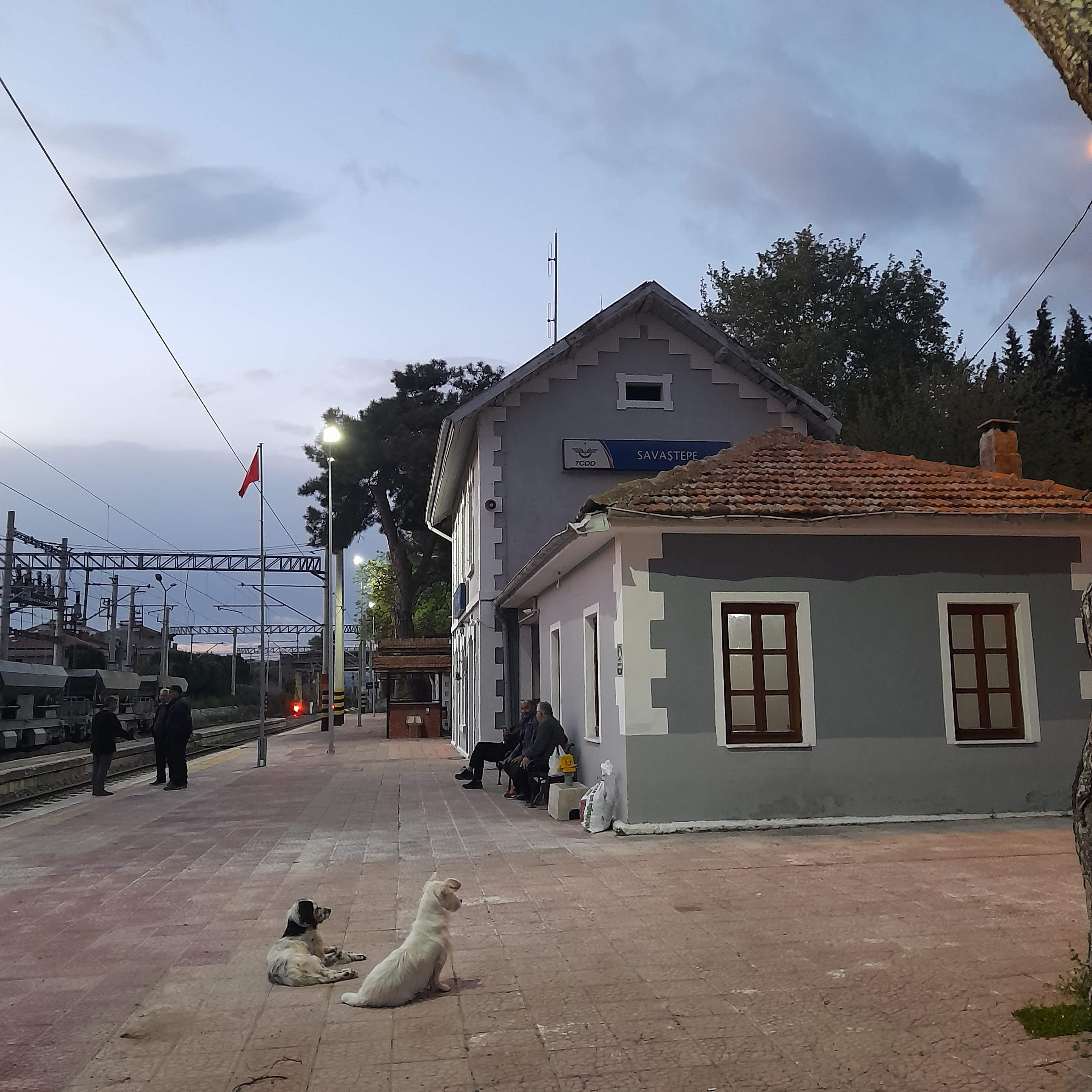

General information
- Location: Yunus Emre Sk., Cumhuriyet Mah. 10590; Savaştepe/Balıkesir; Turkey
- Coordinates: 39.3826°N 27.6504°E
- System: TCDD intercity rail station
- Owner: Turkish State Railways
- Operator: TCDD Taşımacılık
- Line: Manisa-Bandırma railway
- Platforms: 2 (1 side platform, 1 island platform)
- Tracks: 2

Construction
- Structure type: At-grade
- Parking: Located in front of station building.

History
- Opened: 1912

Services
| Preceding station | TCDD Taşımacılık | Following station |
|---|---|---|
| Soma towards İzmir (Basmane) | İzmir Blue Train | Gökköy towards Ankara |
| Soma towards İzmir (Basmane) | 6 Sep Express | Soğucak towards Bandırma |
| Soma towards İzmir (Basmane) | 17 Sep Express | Soğucak towards Bandırma |
| Soma towards İzmir (Basmane) | Aegean Express | Çalıköy towards Eskişehir |
Location

Savaştepe station is a station in Savaştepe, Turkey. Located in the eastern part of the town, four daily trains, operated by TCDD Taşımacılık, stop at the station. The station was originally built by the Smyrna Cassaba Railway in 1912 and sold to the Turkish State Railways in 1934.
