= Bakır railway station =

Bakır
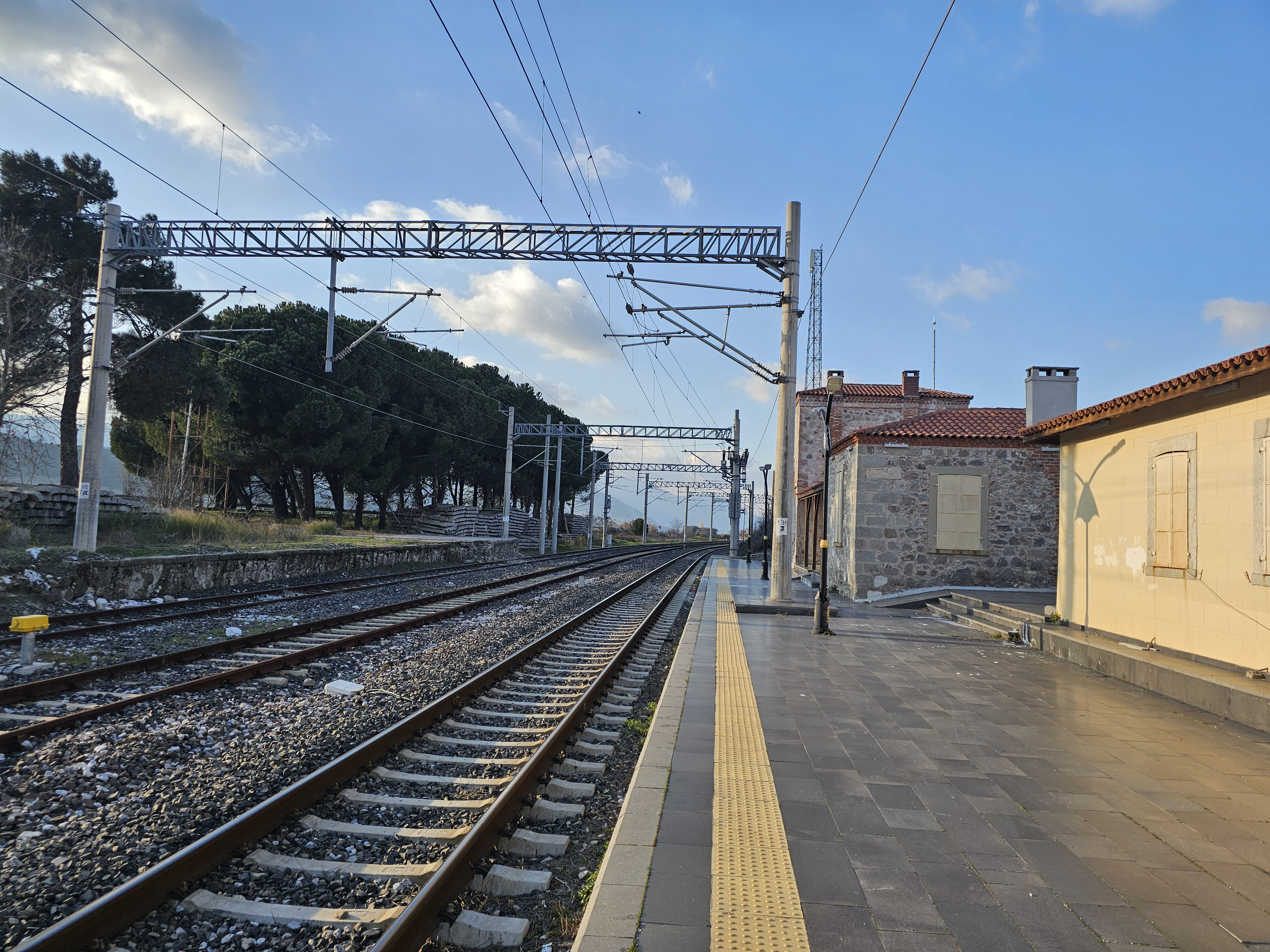

General information
- Location: Selvili Mah. 45200; Akhisar/Manisa; Turkey
- Coordinates: 39.0413°N 27.7477°E
- System: TCDD inter-city rail station
- Owner: Turkish State Railways
- Operator: TCDD Taşımacılık
- Line: Manisa-Bandırma railway
- Platforms: 1 side platform
- Tracks: 1

Construction
- Structure type: At-grade

History
- Opened: 1890
- Electrified: 25 kV AC

Services
Preceding station	TCDD Taşımacılık	Following station
Çobanhasan towards İzmir (Basmane)	Aegean Express	Kırkağaç towards Eskişehir
6 Sep Express does not stop here
17 Sep Express does not stop here
İzmir Blue Train does not stop here
Location

Bakır station is a station just north of the village of Selvili, Turkey. Despite carrying the name Bakır, the village of Bakır is located 5.6 km (3.5 mi) north of the station, within another district. Bakır station consists of a single platform serving one track, with two other tracks serving as siding tracks. TCDD Taşımacılık operates a daily train, the Karesi Express, from İzmir to Balıkesir.

The station was opened in 1890, by the Smyrna Cassaba Railway.
