= Soma railway station =

Railway station in Manisa, Turkey

Soma
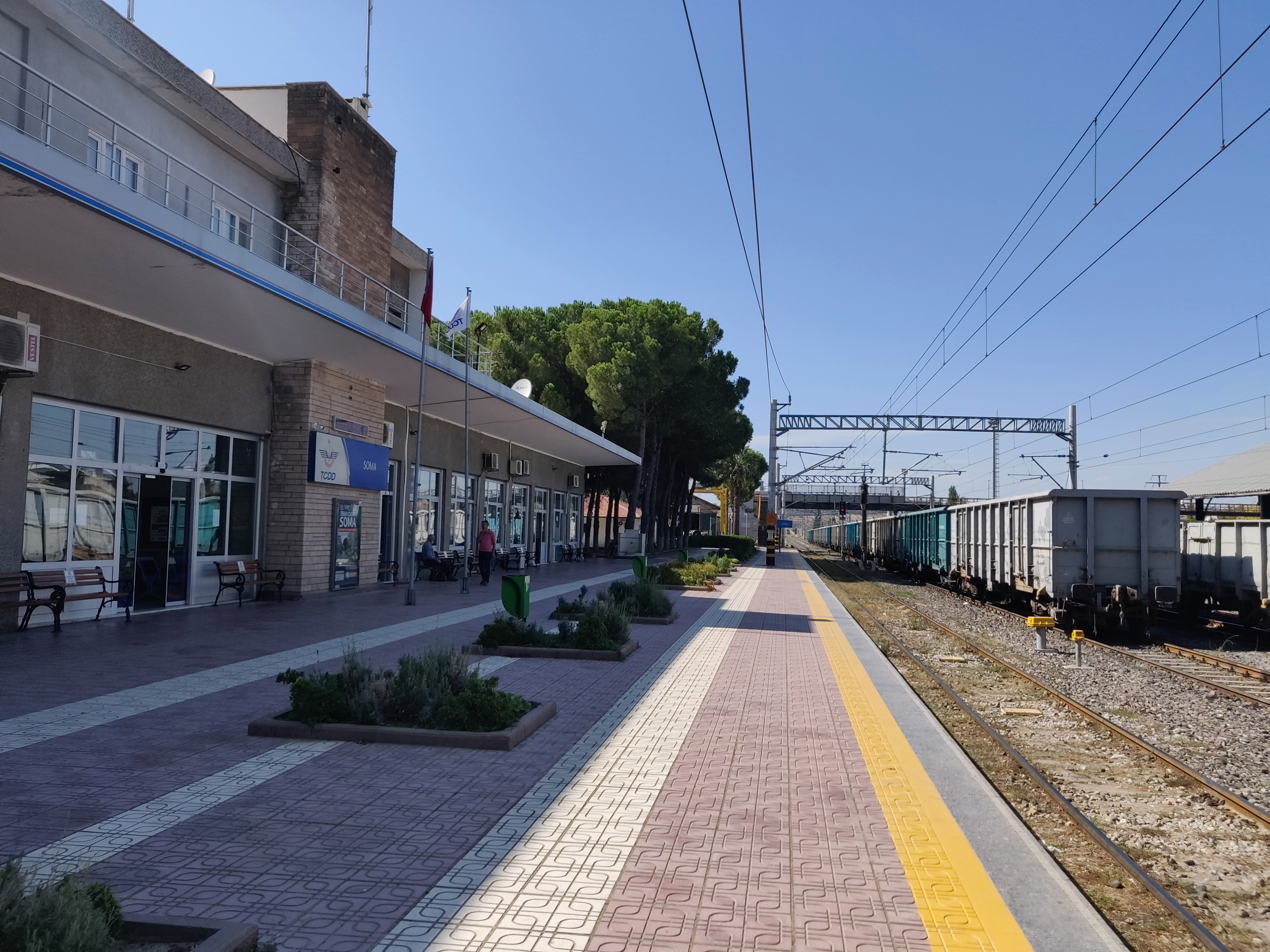

General information
- Location: Atatürk Cd. 2, İstasyon Mah. 45500; Soma/Manisa; Turkey
- Coordinates: 39.198522°N 27.624175°E
- System: TCDD intercity and regional rail station
- Owner: Turkish State Railways
- Operator: TCDD Taşımacılık
- Line: İzmir Blue Train Karesi Express 6 Sep Express 17 Sep Express
- Platforms: 1 side platform
- Tracks: 1

Construction
- Structure type: At-grade
- Parking: Located in front of station building.

History
- Opened: 1890

Services
Preceding station	TCDD Taşımacılık	Following station
Kırkağaç towards İzmir (Basmane)	İzmir Blue Train	Savaştepe towards Ankara
Kırkağaç towards İzmir (Basmane)	6 Sep Express	Savaştepe towards Bandırma
Kırkağaç towards İzmir (Basmane)	17 Sep Express	Savaştepe towards Bandırma
Kırkağaç towards İzmir (Basmane)	Aegean Express	Savaştepe towards Eskişehir
Location

Soma station is a station in Soma, Manisa, Turkey. Located in the northeastern part of the town, four daily trains, operated by TCDD Taşımacılık, stop at the station. The station was originally built by the Smyrna Cassaba Railway in 1890 and sold to the Turkish State Railways in 1934.

== Pictures ==
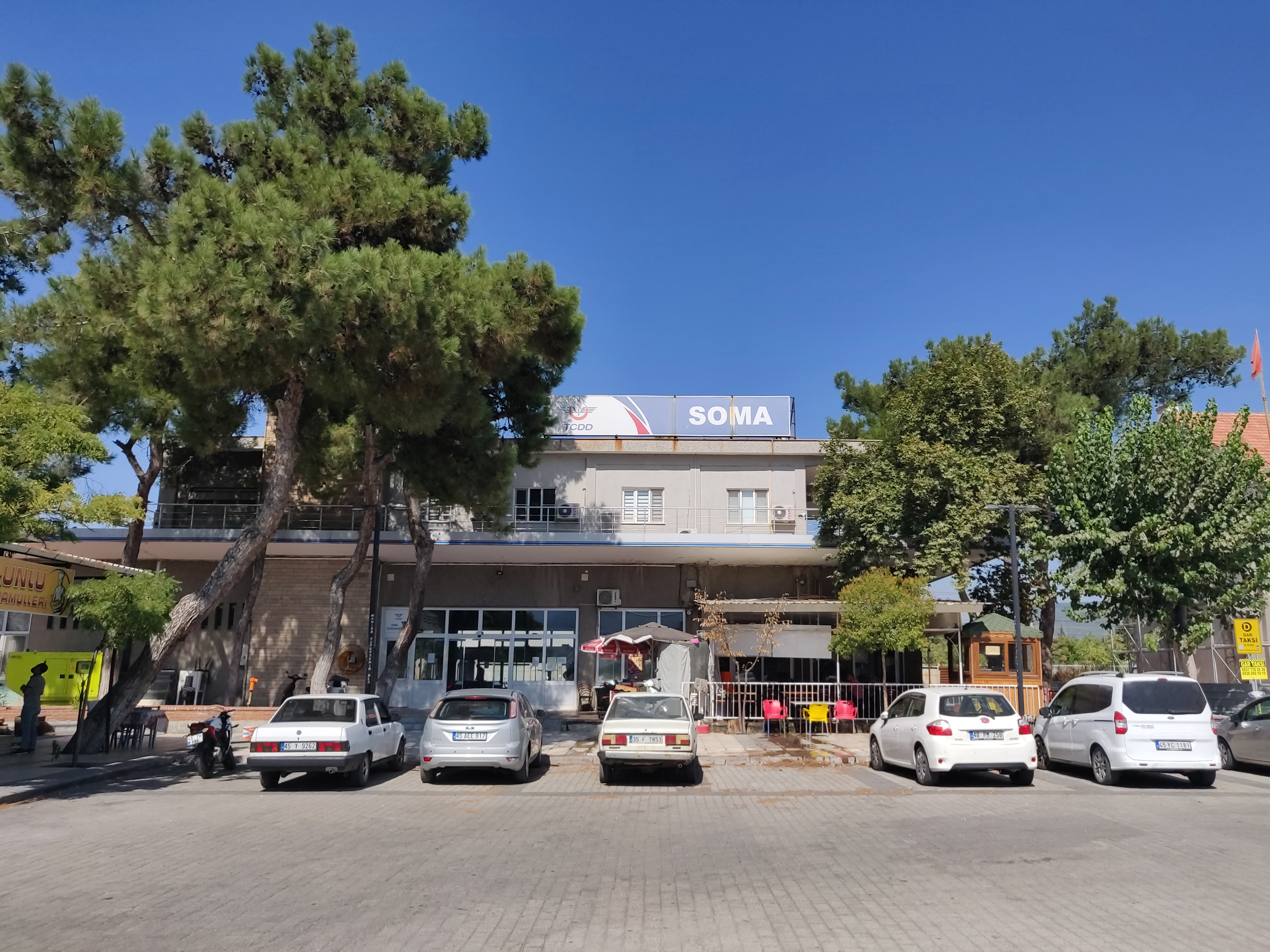
The station building.

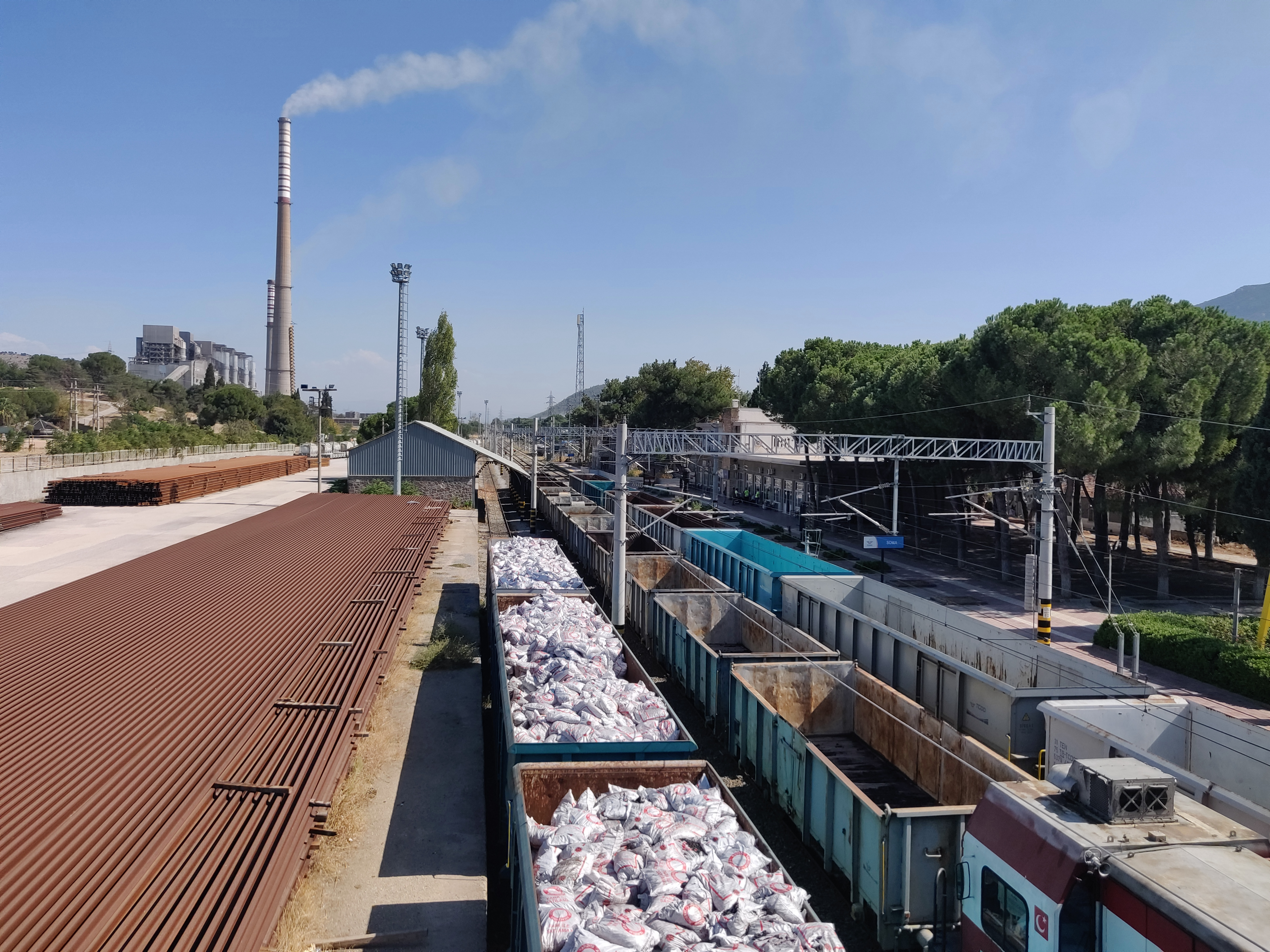
View of the station and the small freight yard.
