= Kayışlar railway station =

KAYIŞLAR
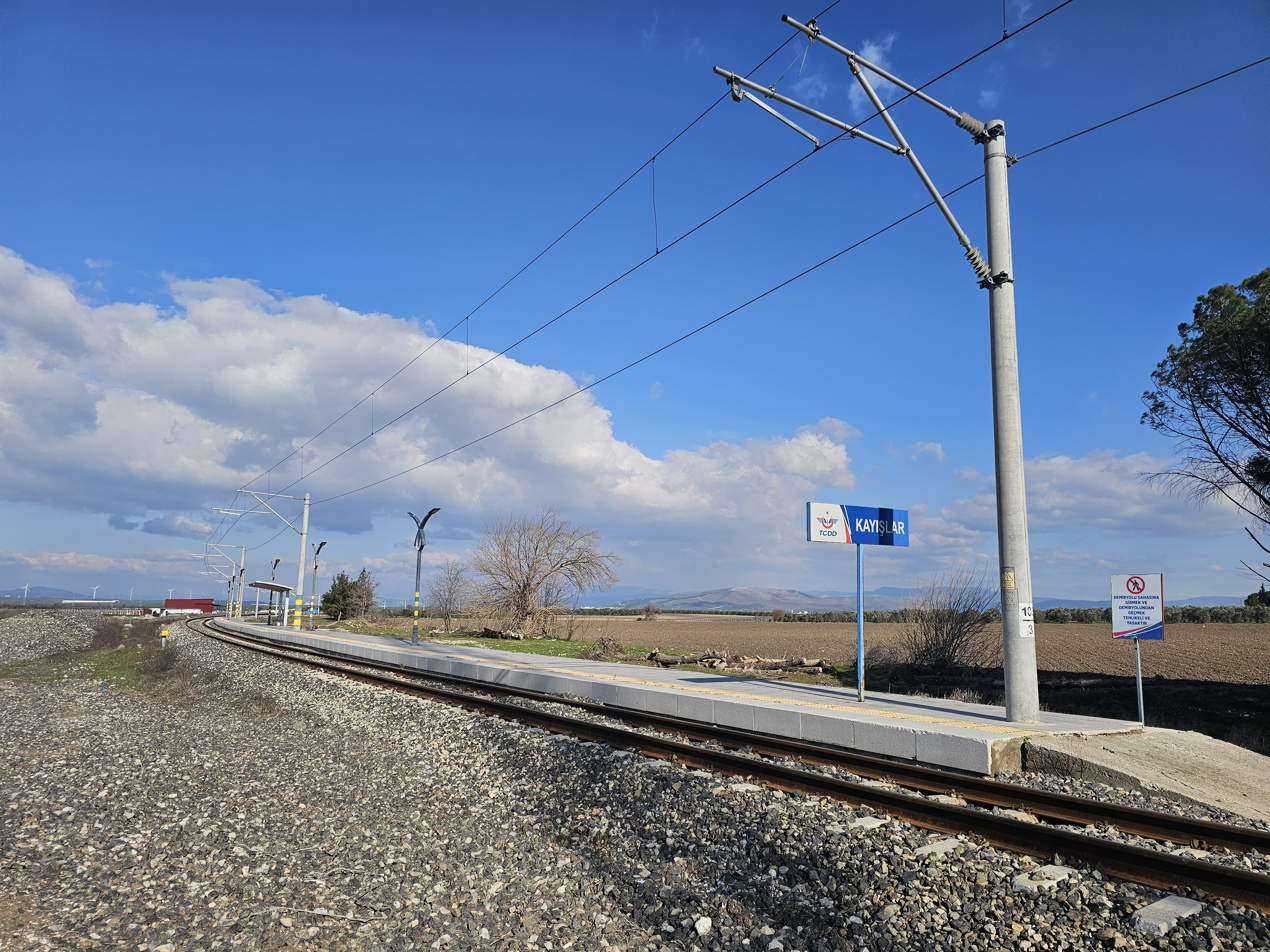

General information
- Location: Kayışlar Köyü, 45800; Saruhanlı, Manisa; Turkey
- Coordinates: 38.851158°N 27.702938°E
- Elevation: 77 m (253 ft)
- System: TCDD Transport inter-city rail station
- Owner: Turkish State Railways
- Operator: TCDD Transport
- Line: Manisa-Bandırma railway
- Distance: 103.2 km (64.1 mi) (İzmir)
- Platforms: 1 side platform
- Tracks: 1

Construction
- Structure type: At-grade
- Parking: No
- Accessible: Yes

Other information
- Status: In operation

History
- Opened: 1890
- Electrified: 2017 (25 kV AC, 50 Hz)
Services
Preceding station	TCDD Taşımacılık	Following station
İshakçelebi towards İzmir (Basmane)	Aegean Express	Kapaklı towards Eskişehir
6 Sep Express does not stop here
17 Sep Express does not stop here
İzmir Blue Train does not stop here
Location

Kayışlar station is a railway station near Kayışlar, Turkey. TCDD Taşımacılık operates a daily train from İzmir that stops at the station: the Aegean Express to Eskişehir. The station consists of a single side platform serving one track. It is accessible via a dirt road, which connects to Gökçeköy Road to the village of Kayışlar.

The station was opened in 1890, by the Smyrna Cassaba Railway.
