= Hacırahmanlı railway station =

HACIRAHMANLI
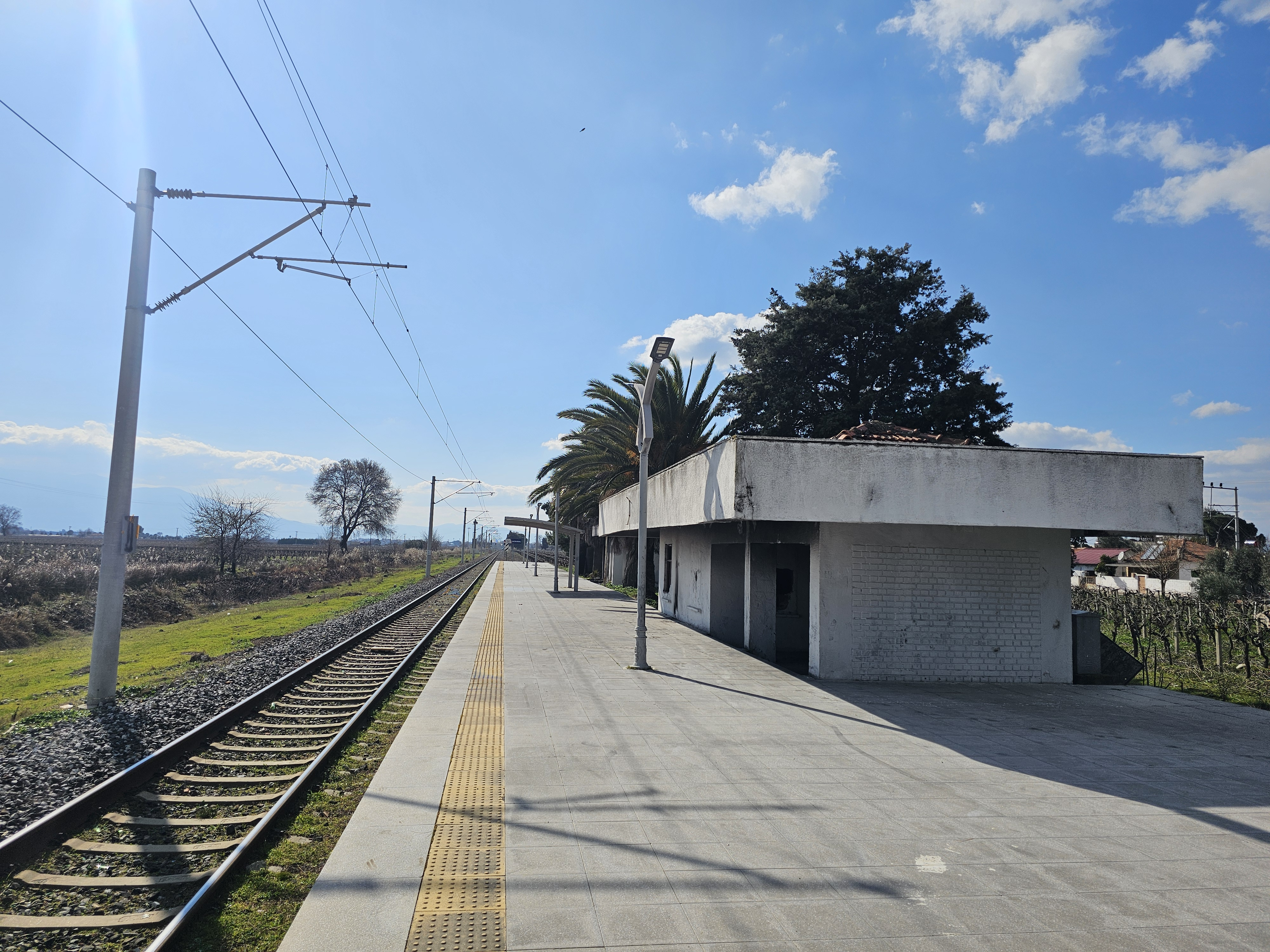

General information
- Location: Hacırahmanlı Köyü, 45800; Saruhanlı, Manisa; Turkey
- Coordinates: 38.747822°N 27.607194°E
- Elevation: 42 m (138 ft)
- System: TCDD Transport inter-city rail station
- Owner: Turkish State Railways
- Operator: TCDD Transport
- Line: Manisa-Bandırma railway
- Distance: 87.6 km (54.4 mi) (İzmir)
- Platforms: 1 side platform
- Tracks: 1

Construction
- Structure type: At-grade
- Parking: No
- Accessible: Yes

Other information
- Status: In operation

History
- Opened: 1890
- Electrified: 2017 (25 kV AC, 50 Hz)
Services
| Preceding station | TCDD Taşımacılık | Following station |
|---|---|---|
| Saruhanlı towards İzmir (Basmane) | Aegean Express | İshakçelebi towards Eskişehir |
6 Sep Express does not stop here
17 Sep Express does not stop here
İzmir Blue Train does not stop here
Location

Hacırahmanlı railway station is a station in Hacırahmanlı, Turkey. TCDD Taşımacılık operates a daily train from İzmir that stops at the station: the Aegean Express to Bandırma.

The station was opened in 1890, by the Smyrna Cassaba Railway.
