= Balıkesir railway station =

Railway station in Turkey

Balıkesir
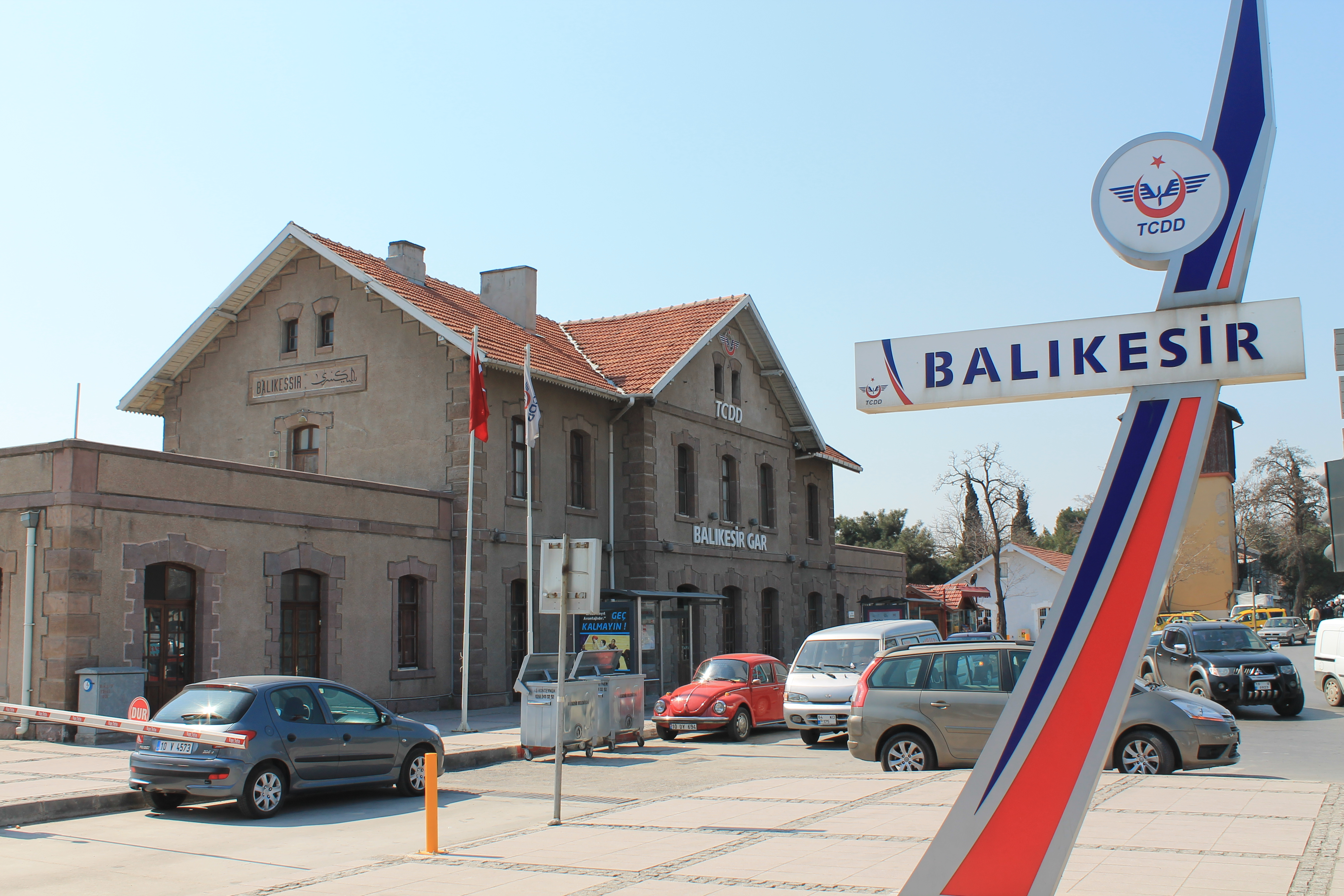

General information
- Location: Cumhuriyet Meydanı, Gümüçşme Mah., 10040; Balıkesir Merkez/Balıkesir; Turkey
- Coordinates: 39.6470°N 27.8883°E
- System: TCDD Taşımacılık intercity rail station
- Owner: Turkish State Railways
- Operator: TCDD Taşımacılık
- Line: İzmir Blue Train Karesi Express 6 Sep Express 17 Sep Express Aegean Express
- Platforms: 2 (1 side platform, 1 island platform
- Tracks: 2

Construction
- Structure type: At-grade
- Parking: Yes

History
- Opened: 1912
- Electrified: 2016; 25 kV AC, 50 Hz

Services
Preceding station	TCDD Taşımacılık	Following station
Gökköy towards İzmir (Basmane)	İzmir Blue Train	Mezitler towards Ankara
Gökköy towards İzmir (Basmane)	6 Sep Express	Yeniköy towards Bandırma
Gökköy towards İzmir (Basmane)	17 Sep Express	Yeniköy towards Bandırma
Gökköy towards İzmir (Basmane)	Karesi Express	Terminus
Terminus	Aegean Express	Çandır towards Eskişehir
Location

Balıkesir station (Turkish: Balıkesir Garı) is the main railway station in Balıkesir, Turkey. The station was built in 1912 by the Smyrna Cassaba Railway as part of their railway from Manisa to Bandırma. TCDD Taşımacılık operates four daily intercity trains, two of which terminate at Balıkesir. The stations consists of one side platform and one island platform serving two tracks. A freight yard is adjacent to the platforms, but in the mid-2010s was set to be decommissioned with the station ground to be used solely for passenger trains.
