= Çobanhasan railway station =

ÇOBANHASAN
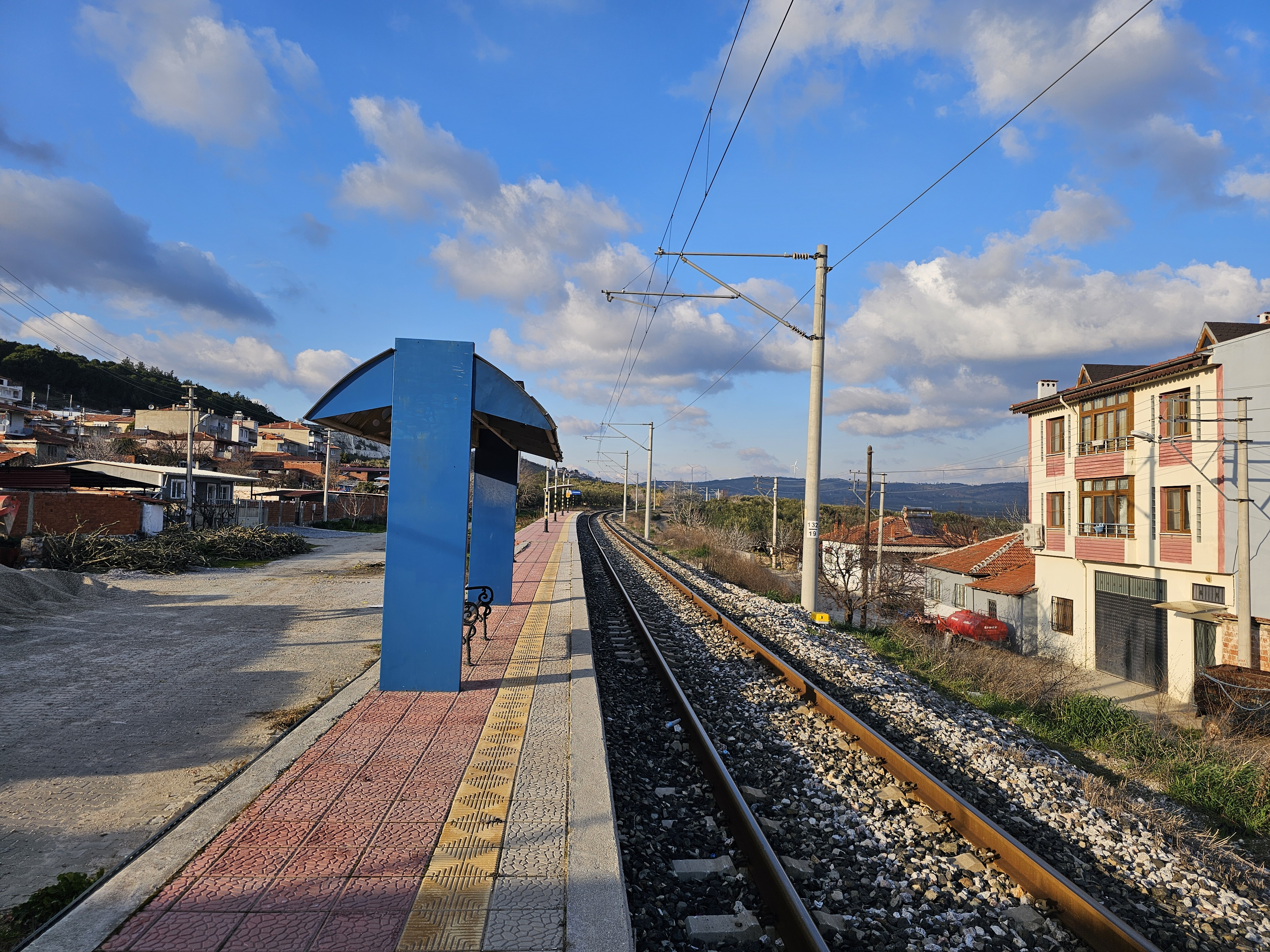

General information
- Location: Çobanhasan Köyü 45200; Akhisar/Manisa; Turkey
- Coordinates: 39.0131°N 27.7566°E
- System: TCDD inter-city rail station
- Owner: Turkish State Railways
- Operator: TCDD Taşımacılık
- Line: Manisa-Bandırma railway
- Platforms: 1 side platform
- Tracks: 1

Construction
- Structure type: At-grade

History
- Opened: 1890
- Electrified: 25 kV AC

Services
Preceding station	TCDD Taşımacılık	Following station
Sünnetçiler towards İzmir (Basmane)	Aegean Express	Bakır towards Eskişehir
6 Sep Express does not stop here
17 Sep Express does not stop here
İzmir Blue Train does not stop here
Location

Çobanhasan station is a station in the village of Çobanhasan, Turkey. The station consists of a single platform serving one track. TCDD Taşımacılık operates two daily trains that stop at the station: the 6th of September Express and the 17th of September Express.

The station was opened in 1890, by the Smyrna Cassaba Railway.
