= Çalıköy railway station =

Railway station in Turkey

ÇALIKÖY
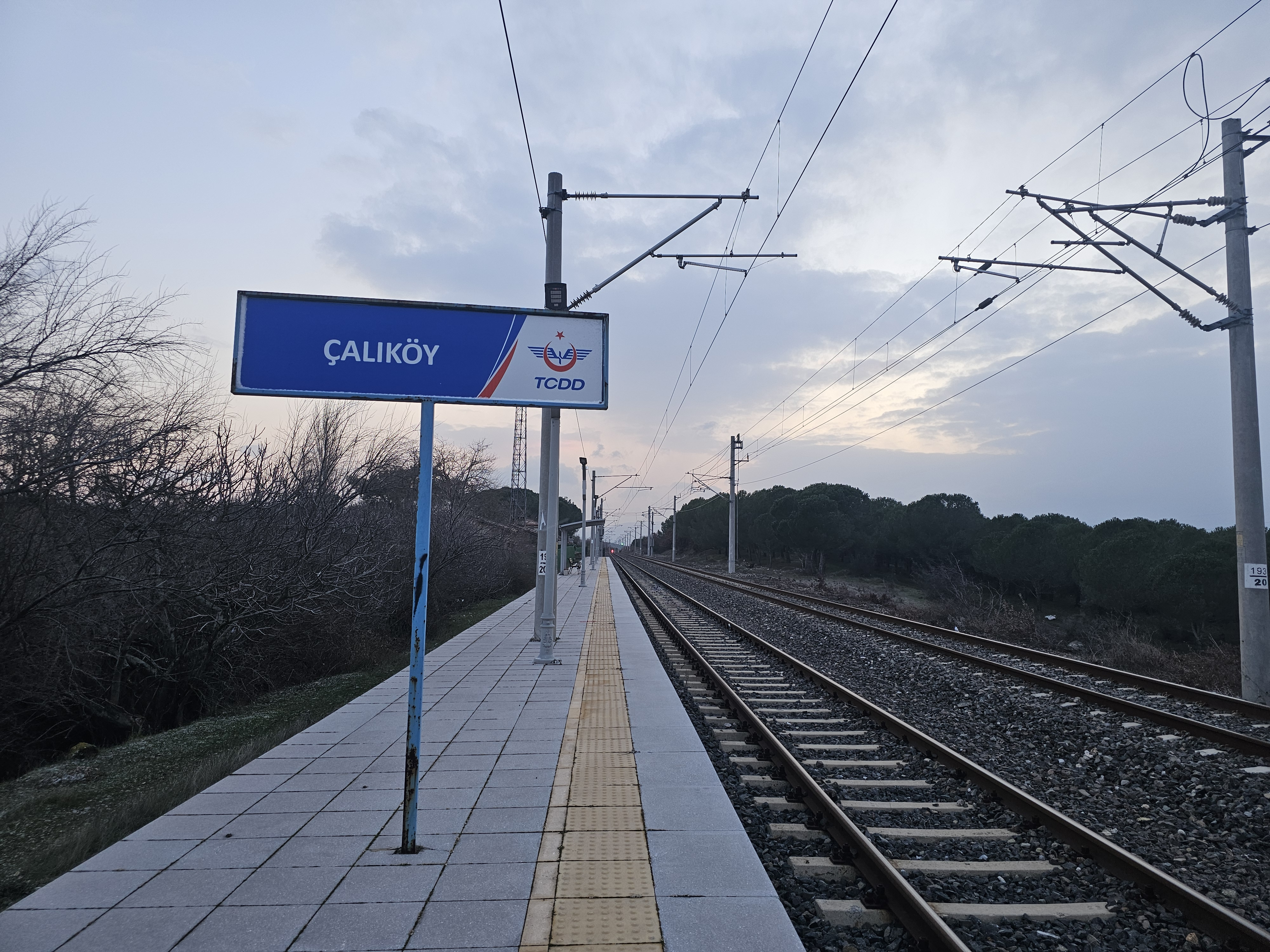

General information
- Location: Karacalar Mah. 10580; Savaştepe/Balıkesir; Turkey
- Coordinates: 39.4393°N 27.6398°E
- Owner: Turkish State Railways
- Operator: TCDD Taşımacılık
- Line: Manisa-Bandırma railway
- Platforms: 1 side platform
- Tracks: 1

Construction
- Structure type: At-grade

History
- Opened: 1912
- Closed: 2017

Services
Preceding station	TCDD Taşımacılık	Following station
Savaştepe towards İzmir (Basmane)	Aegean Express	Soğucak towards Eskişehir
6 Sep Express does not stop here
17 Sep Express does not stop here
İzmir Blue Train does not stop here
Location

Çalıköy station is an unused railway station near Karacalar, Savaştepe, Turkey. Located just outside the village, passenger rail service bypassed the station in December 2017. The station was originally built by the Smyrna Cassaba Railway in 1912 and sold to the Turkish State Railways in 1934.
