= Sünnetçiler railway station =

Railway station in Manisa, Turkey

SÜNNETÇİLER
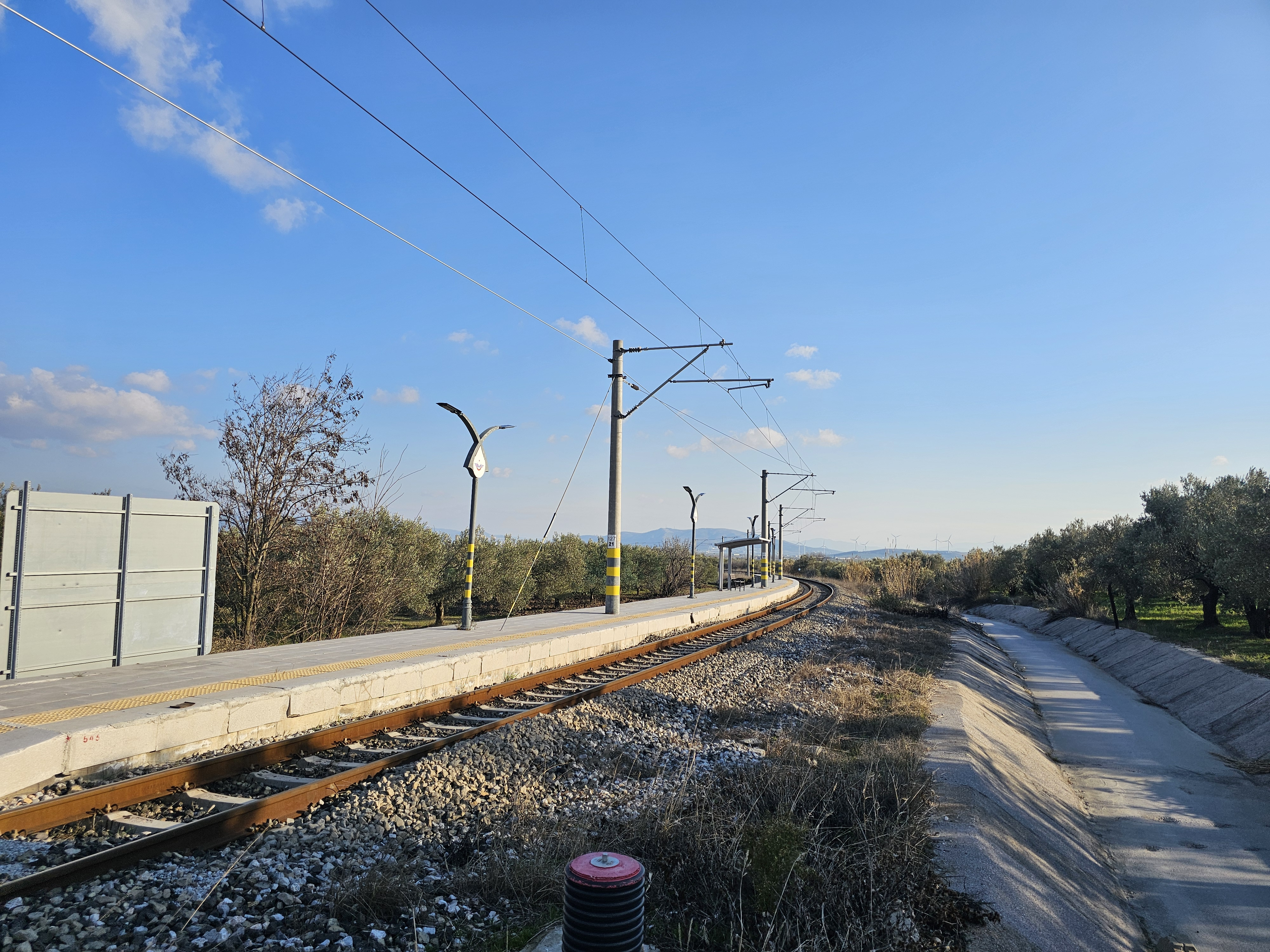

General information
- Location: Sünnetçiler Köyü 45200, Akhisar/Manisa; Turkey
- Coordinates: 38.972428°N 27.756683°E
- System: TCDD inter-city rail station
- Owner: Turkish State Railways
- Operator: TCDD Taşımacılık
- Line: Manisa-Bandırma railway
- Platforms: 1 side platform
- Tracks: 1

History
- Opened: 1890
- Electrified: 25 kV AC

Services
Preceding station	TCDD Taşımacılık	Following station
Akhisar towards İzmir (Basmane)	Aegean Express	Çobanhasan towards Eskişehir
6 Sep Express does not stop here
17 Sep Express does not stop here
İzmir Blue Train does not stop here
Location

Sünnetçiler station is a station near the village of Sünnetçiler, Turkey. TCDD Taşımacılık operates two daily trains, both from İzmir, that stop at the station: the 6th of September Express and the 17th of September Express to Bandırma.

The station was opened in 1890, by the Smyrna Cassaba Railway.
