= Karaağaçlı railway station =

Railway station in Turkey

KARAAĞAÇLI
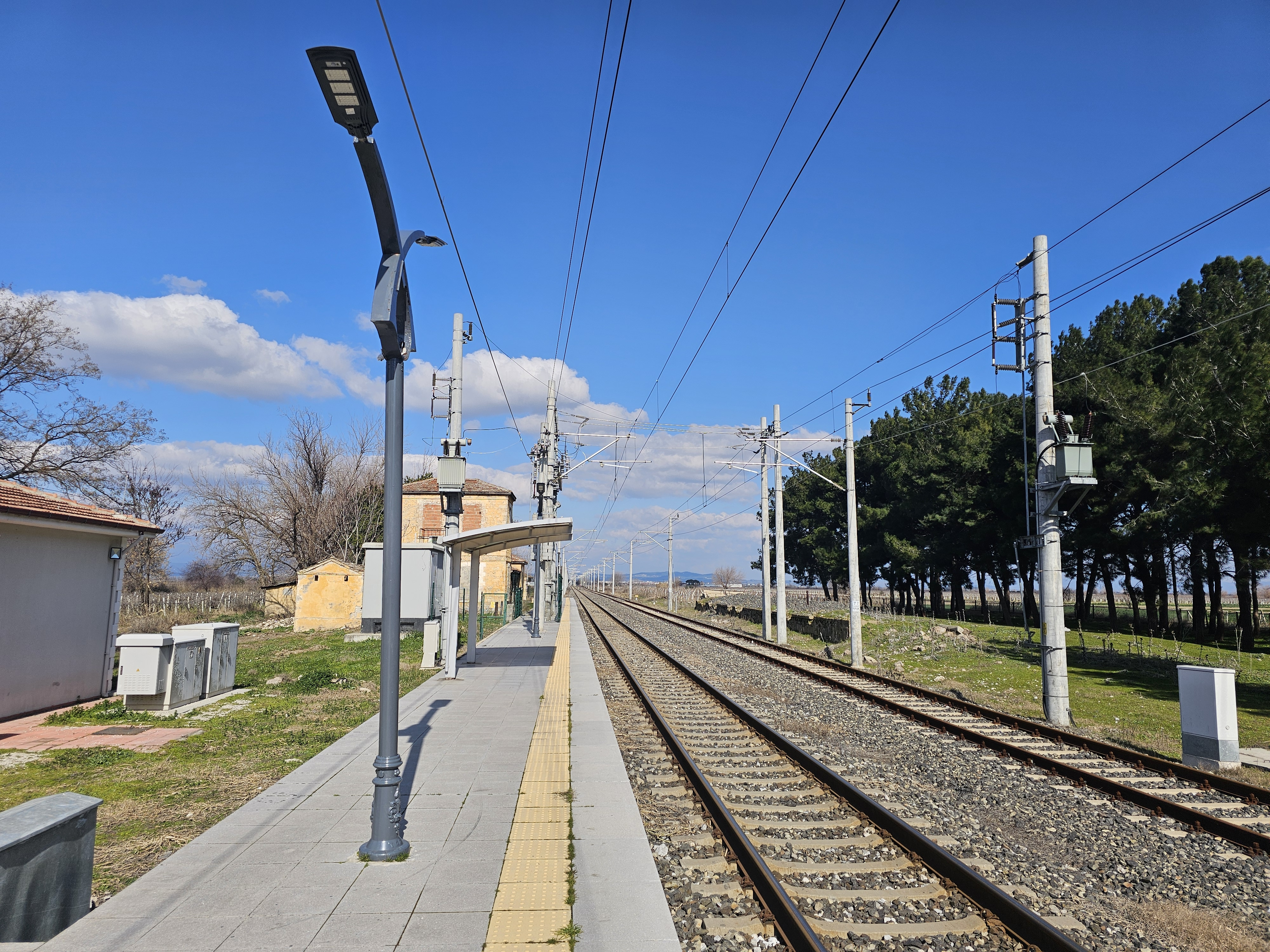

General information
- Location: Karaağaçlı Köyü İç Yolu, Karaağaçlı, 45080; Şehzadeler, Manisa Province; Turkey
- Coordinates: 38.684704°N 27.527131°E
- Elevation: 32 m (105 ft)
- System: TCDD Transport inter-city rail station
- Owner: Turkish State Railways
- Operator: TCDD Transport
- Line: Manisa-Bandırma railway
- Distance: 77.5 km (48.2 mi) (İzmir)
- Platforms: 1 side platform
- Tracks: 2

Construction
- Structure type: At-grade
- Parking: No
- Accessible: Yes

Other information
- Status: In operation

History
- Opened: 1890
- Electrified: 2017 (25 kV AC, 50 Hz)
Services
Preceding station	TCDD Taşımacılık	Following station
Manisa towards İzmir (Basmane)	Aegean Express	Saruhanlı towards Eskişehir
6 Sep Express does not stop here
17 Sep Express does not stop here
İzmir Blue Train does not stop here
Location

Karaağaçlı station is a station in Karaağaçlı, Turkey. TCDD Taşımacılık operates one daily train from İzmir, that stop at the station: the Aegean Express to Eskişehir.

The station was opened in 1890, by the Smyrna Cassaba Railway.
