= Akhisar (disambiguation) =

Akhisar is a municipality and district of Manisa Province, Turkey.

Akhisar may also refer to:

- Akhisar railway station, served by TCDD Transport
- Akhisar railway station (1890–2018), built by the Smyrna Cassaba Railway
- Akhisar, Adıyaman, a village in the Adıyaman District, Adıyaman Province, Turkey
- Akhisar, Aksaray or Hisn Sinan, a village in Aksaray Province, Turkey
- Akhisar, İnegöl, a neighbourhood in Bursa Province, Turkey
- Akhisar, Karacabey, a neighbourhood in Bursa Province, Turkey
- Ottoman torpedo boat Akhisar, launched in Italy in 1904
- TCG Akhisar (P 114), ex-USS PC-1641
- TCG Akhisar (P 1220), a Hisar-class offshore patrol vessel launched in 2023, sold to Romania

== See also ==
- TCG Akhisar, index of ships of the Turkish Navy with the name
