= Akhisar railway station =

Railway station in Akhisar, Turkey

AKHİSAR
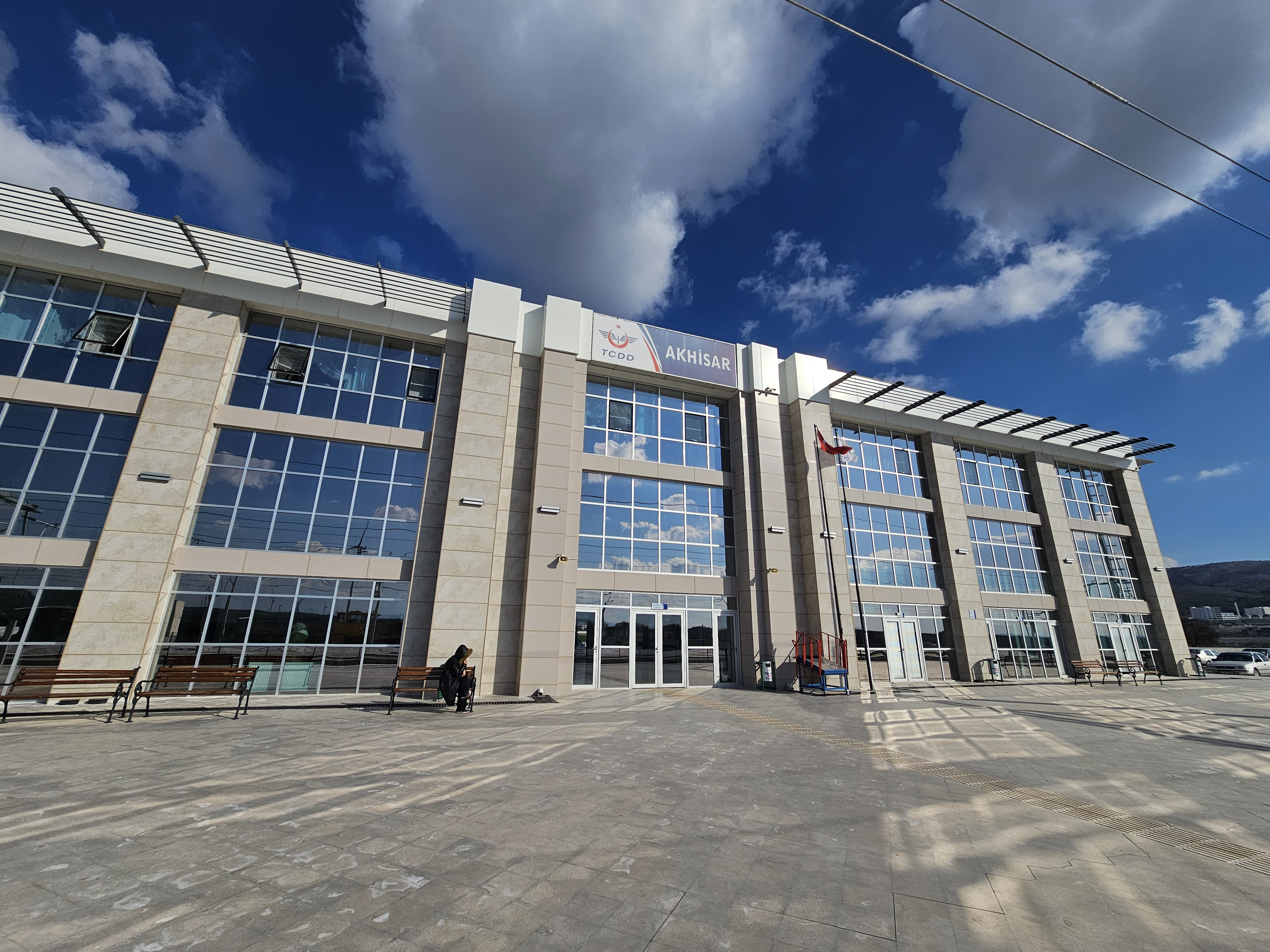

General information
- Location: 167 Sk., Atatürk Mah., 45220; Akhisar, Manisa; Turkey
- Coordinates: 38.909870°N 27.790708°E
- Elevation: 86 m (282 ft)
- System: TCDD Transport inter-city rail station
- Owner: Turkish State Railways
- Operator: TCDD Transport
- Line: Manisa-Bandırma railway
- Distance: 117.4 km (72.9 mi) (İzmir)
- Platforms: 3 (2 island platforms, 1 side platform
- Tracks: 5

Construction
- Structure type: At-grade
- Parking: Yes
- Accessible: Yes

Other information
- Status: In operation

History
- Opened: 20 April 2018
- Electrified: 2018; 25 kV AC, 50 Hz, OHLE
Services
Preceding station	TCDD Taşımacılık	Following station
Saruhanlı towards İzmir (Basmane)	6 Sep Express	Kırkağaç towards Bandırma
Saruhanlı towards İzmir (Basmane)	17 Sep Express	Kırkağaç towards Bandırma
Saruhanlı towards İzmir (Basmane)	İzmir Blue Train	Kırkağaç towards Ankara
Kapaklı towards İzmir (Basmane)	Aegean Express	Sünnetçiler towards Eskişehir
Location

Akhisar railway station is a station in Akhisar, Turkey. TCDD Taşımacılık operates four trains, both from İzmir, that stop at the station: the İzmir Blue Train to Ankara, the Aegean Express to Eskişehir as well as the 6th of September Express and the 17th of September Express to Bandırma. As of 26 March 2020, all passenger train service had been temporarily suspended, due to the COVID-19 pandemic, but has since resumed.

The station was opened on 20 April 2018, as a replacement to the original station, located in the city center.

== Gallery ==
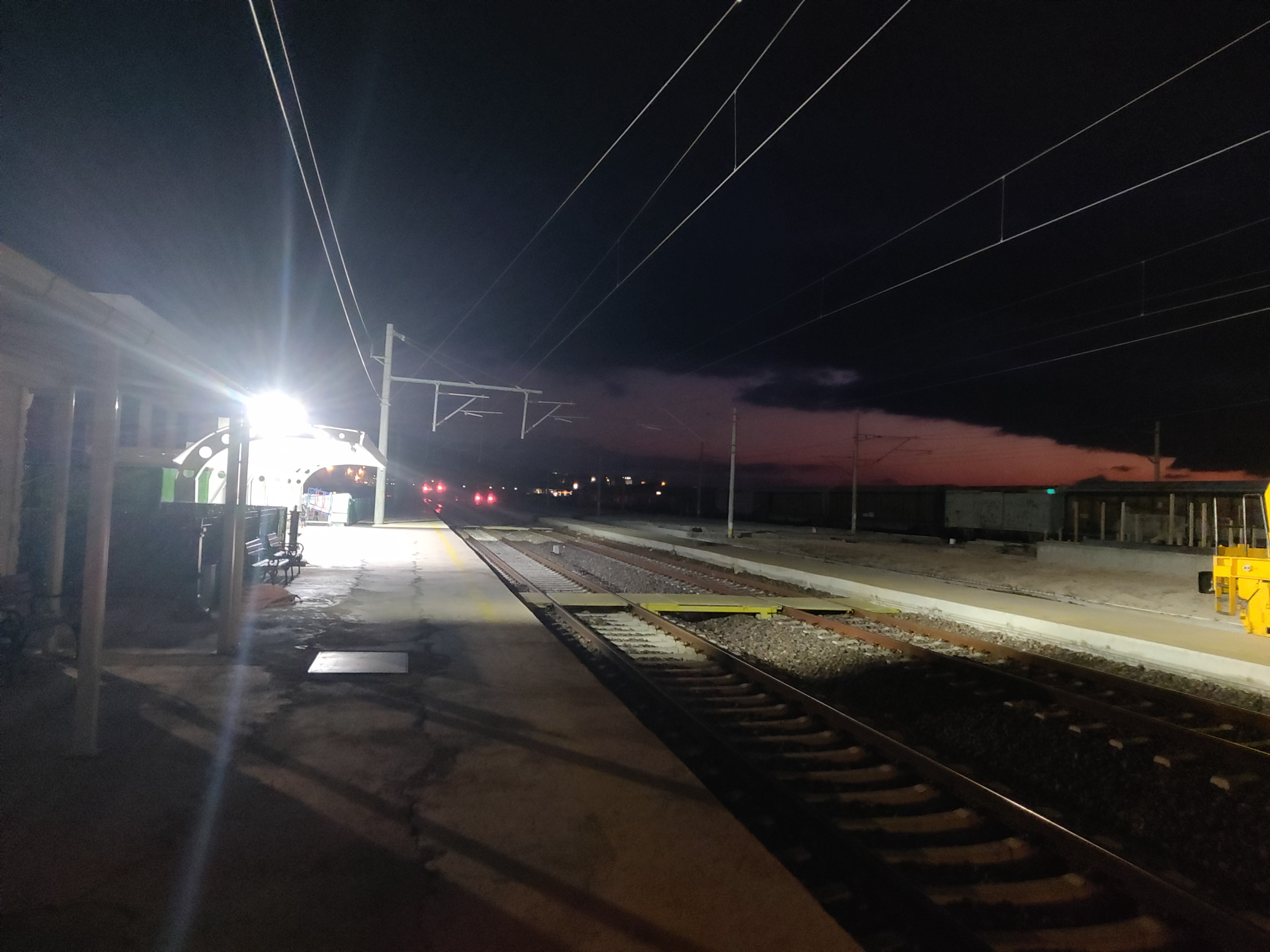
The temporary station platforms when the station was first opened to traffic.

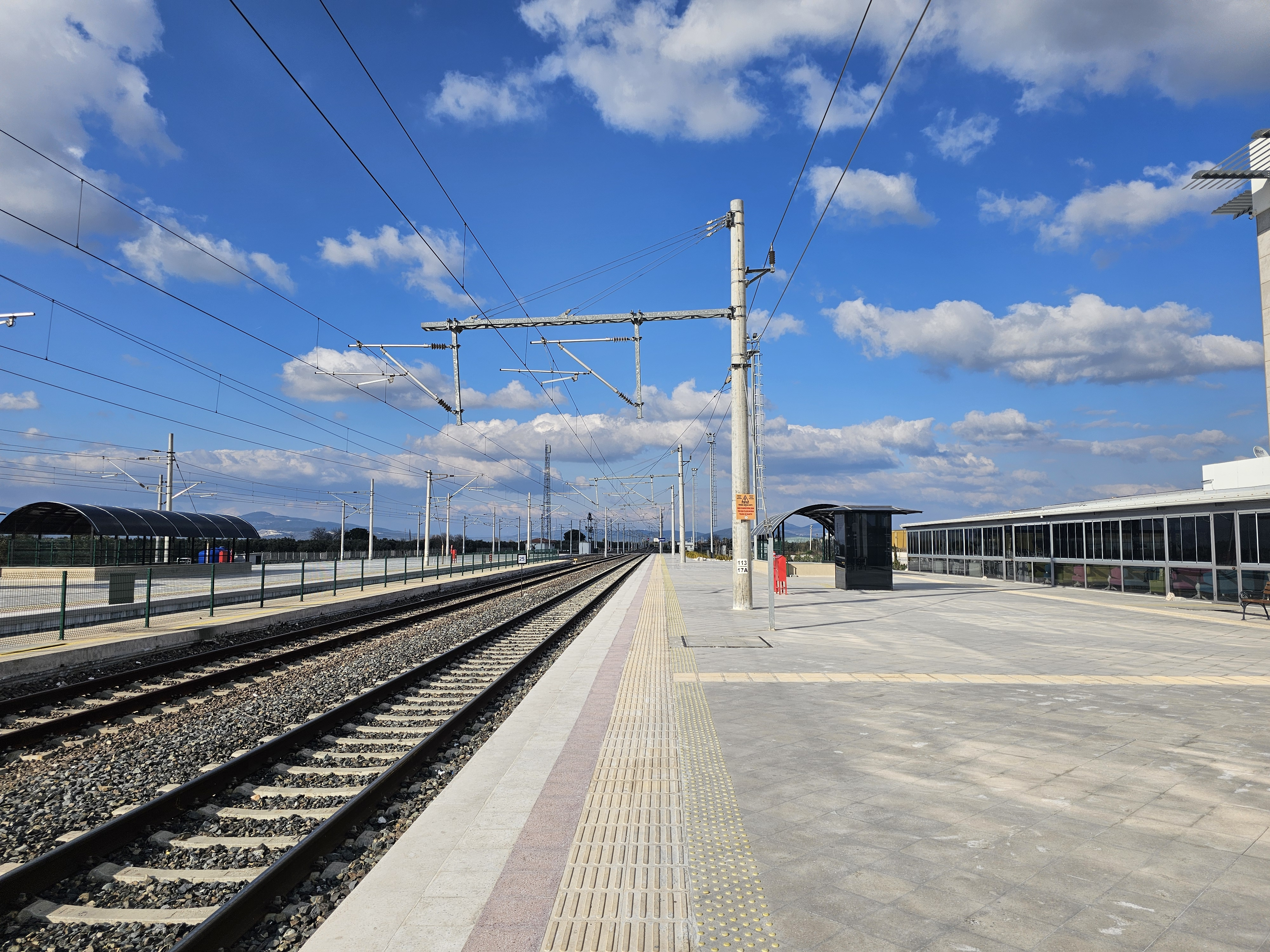
The station platforms.

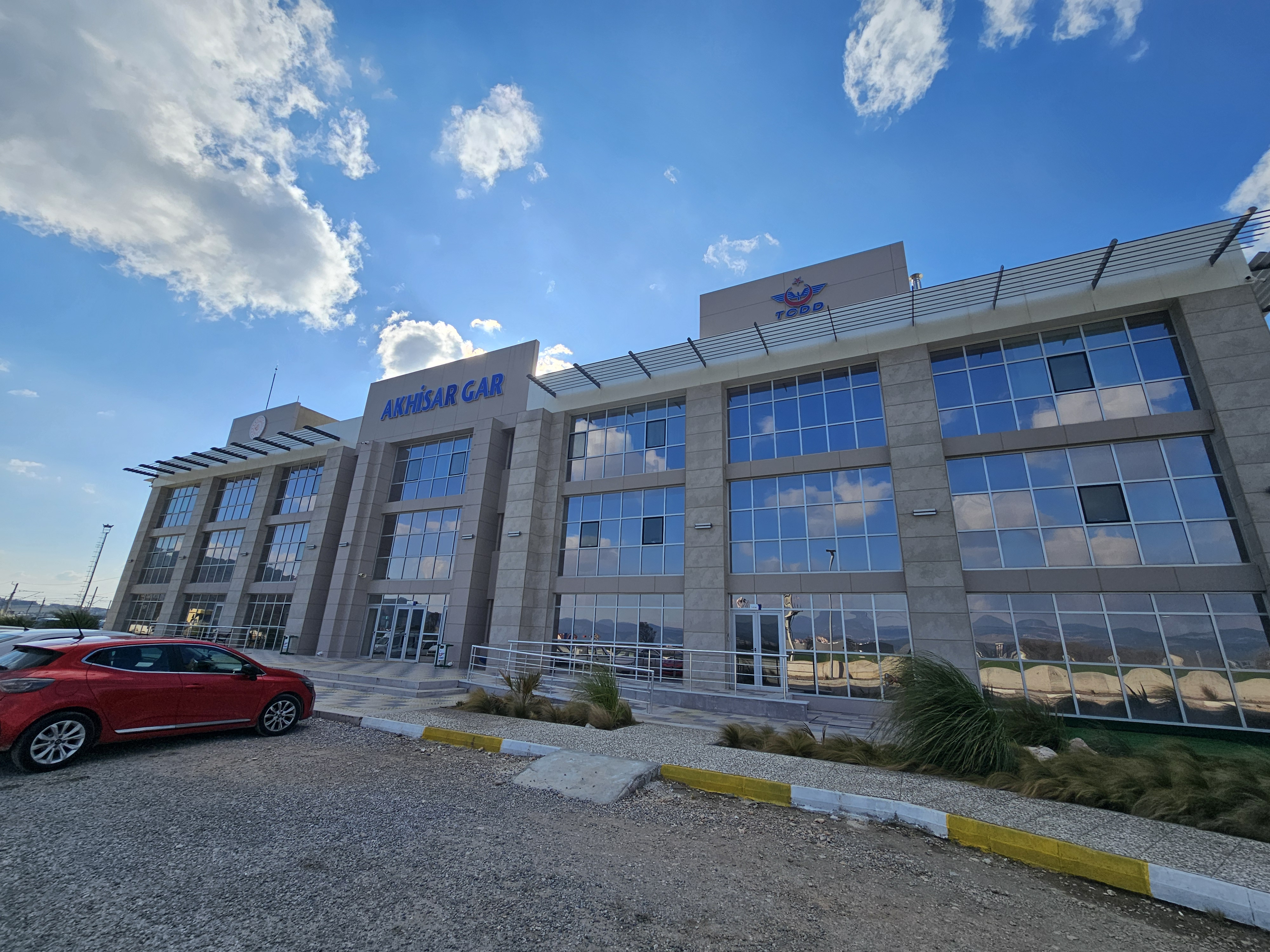
The station building from the street side.
