= Susurluk railway station =

Railway station in Turkey

Susurluk

General information
- Location: Muammer Aksoy Blv., Yeni Mah., 10600; Susurluk, Balıkesir; Turkey
- Coordinates: 39.9256°N 28.1530°E
- System: TCDD intercity rail station
- Owner: Turkish State Railways
- Operator: TCDD Taşımacılık
- Line: 6 Sep Express 17 Sep Express
- Platforms: 2 (1 side platform, 1 island platform)
- Tracks: 2

Construction
- Structure type: At-grade
- Parking: Yes

History
- Opened: 1913
- Electrified: 2017; 25 kV AC, 60 Hz

Services
Preceding station	TCDD Taşımacılık	Following station
Yeniköy towards İzmir (Basmane)	6 Sep Express	Aksakal towards Bandırma
Yeniköy towards İzmir (Basmane)	17 Sep Express	Aksakal towards Bandırma
Location

Susurluk railway station (Turkish: Slusurluk istasyonu) is a railway station in Susurluk, Turkey. Located just north of the town, TCDD Taşımacılık operates two daily trains from İzmir to Bandırma: The southbound 6th of September Express and the northbound 17th of September Express. The station was built in 1913, by the Smyrna Cassaba Railway.
