= Gökköy railway station =

Railway station near Gökköy, Turkey

Gökköy

General information
- Location: Gökköy Mah., 10185; Balıkesir Merkez/Balıkesir; Turkey
- Coordinates: 39.5952°N 27.8265°E
- System: TCDD intercity rail station
- Owner: Turkish State Railways
- Operator: TCDD Taşımacılık
- Line: İzmir Blue Train 6 Sep Express 17 Sep Express
- Platforms: 1 side platform
- Tracks: 1

Construction
- Structure type: At-grade
- Parking: Yes

History
- Opened: 15 March 2015
- Electrified: 2016; 25 kV AC, 60 Hz

Services
Preceding station	TCDD Taşımacılık	Following station
Savaştepe towards İzmir (Basmane)	İzmir Blue Train	Balıkesir towards Ankara
Soğucak towards İzmir (Basmane)	6 Sep Express	Balıkesir towards Bandırma
Çukurhüseyin towards İzmir (Basmane)	17 Sep Express	Balıkesir towards Bandırma
Location

Gökköy railway station (Turkish: Gökköy istasyonu) is a railway station opened in 2015 near Gökköy, Turkey. The station is a part of the Gökköy Logistics Center. TCDD Taşımacılık operates three daily intercity trains from Eskişehir and Bandırma to İzmir.

Gökköy station was opened on 15 March 2015.

== Gökköy Logistics Center ==
Gökköy Logistics Center (Turkish: Gökköy Lojistik Merkezi) is a freight railyard and one of 19 similar facilities that are in operation or under construction in Turkey. The facility consists of a railway station with one side platform servicing one track, a railcar maintenance facility, a yard for freight trains and an intermodal freight transferring yard.

=== History ===
Plans to build a new freight rail yard outside the city of Balıkesir were finalized in 2007. The Turkish State Railways and the Balıkesir Metropolitan Municipality agreed to construct a new 211,000 m^{2} (2,270,000 sq ft) railyard near the village of Gökköy, inside the Balıkesir Industrial Park (Balıkesir OSB). In doing so, the existing freight yard next to Balıkesir station, in the city center, would be decommissioned and the property used solely for passenger trains. Construction of the facility began in 2012 and was expected to be complete by mid-2013. Opening of the facility was delayed by two until 15 March 2015, when Gökköy was officially opened by President Recep Tayyip Erdoğan in a ceremony at the facility.
