= Sığırcı railway station =

Railway station in Turkey

Sığırcı

General information
- Location: D.200, Akçapınar Mah. 10200; Bandırma, Balıkesir; Turkey
- Coordinates: 40.2700°N 28.0516°E
- System: TCDD intercity rail station
- Owner: Turkish State Railways
- Operator: TCDD Taşımacılık
- Line: 6 Sep Express
- Platforms: 1 side platform
- Tracks: 4

Construction
- Structure type: At-grade
- Parking: Yes

History
- Electrified: 2017; 25 kV AC, 60 Hz

Services
Preceding station	TCDD Taşımacılık	Following station
Aksakal towards İzmir (Basmane)	6 Sep Express	Kuşcenneti towards Bandırma
Location

Sığırcı railway station (Turkish: Sığırcı istasyonu) is a railway station in the Balıkesir Province of Turkey. The station is located along the D.200 state highway, near the villages of Akçapınar (northeast), Doğruca (northwest) and Yenisığırcı (west). TCDD Taşımacılık operates a daily train from Bandırma to İzmir, the southbound 6th of September Express. The 17th of September Express, which operates along the same route, does not stop at Sığırcı.
