= Aksakal railway station =

Railway station in Turkey

Aksakal

General information
- Location: Aksakal Mah., 10245; Bandırma, Balıkesir; Turkey
- Coordinates: 40.14371°N 28.08872°E
- System: TCDD intercity rail station
- Owner: Turkish State Railways
- Operator: TCDD Taşımacılık
- Line: 6 Sep Express 17 Sep Express
- Platforms: 1 side platform
- Tracks: 3

Construction
- Structure type: At-grade
- Parking: Yes

History
- Electrified: 2017; 25 kV AC, 60 Hz

Services
Preceding station	TCDD Taşımacılık	Following station
Susurluk towards İzmir (Basmane)	6 Sep Express	Sığırcı towards Bandırma
Susurluk towards İzmir (Basmane)	17 Sep Express	Kuşcenneti towards Bandırma
Location

Aksakal railway station (Turkish: Aksakal istasyonu) is a railway station near Ergili, Balıkesir in Turkey. Located about 2 km (1.2 mi) northeast of the villagen, TCDD Taşımacılık operates two daily trains from İzmir to Bandırma: The southbound 6th of September Express and the northbound 17th of September Express.
