= Çukurhüseyin railway station =

Railway station near Çukurhüseyin, Balıkesir in Turkey

Çukurhüseyin

General information
- Location: İl 10-51, Çukurhüseyin Köyü, 10190; Balıkesir Merkez/Balıkesir; Turkey
- Coordinates: 39.5728°N 27.7586°E
- System: TCDD intercity rail station
- Owner: Turkish State Railways
- Operator: TCDD Taşımacılık
- Line: 17 Sep Express
- Platforms: 2 (1 side platform, 1 island platform)
- Tracks: 2

Construction
- Structure type: At-grade
- Parking: Yes

History
- Opened: 1912
- Electrified: 2016; 25 kV AC, 60 Hz

Services
Preceding station	TCDD Taşımacılık	Following station
Soğucak towards İzmir (Basmane)	17 Sep Express	Gökköy towards Bandırma
Location

Çukurhüseyin railway station is a railway station near the village of Çukurhüseyin, Balıkesir in Turkey. TCDD Taşımacılık operates a daily intercity train from İzmir to Bandırma. Since passenger traffic is low, the station acts a siding to allow trains to pass.
