= Yeniköy railway station =

Railway station in the village of Yeniköy, Balıkesir in Turkey

Yeniköy

General information
- Location: Yeniköy Mah., 10010; Balıkesir Merkez/Balıkesir; Turkey
- Coordinates: 39.7783°N 28.0045°E
- System: TCDD intercity rail station
- Owner: Turkish State Railways
- Operator: TCDD Taşımacılık
- Line: 6 Sep Express 17 Sep Express
- Platforms: 2 (1 side platform, 1 island platform)
- Tracks: 3

Construction
- Structure type: At-grade
- Parking: Yes

History
- Electrified: 2017; 25 kV AC, 60 Hz

Services
Preceding station	TCDD Taşımacılık	Following station
Balıkesir towards İzmir (Basmane)	6 Sep Express	Susurluk towards Bandırma
Balıkesir towards İzmir (Basmane)	17 Sep Express	Susurluk towards Bandırma
Location

Yeniköy railway station (Turkish: Yeniköy istasyonu) is a railway station in the village of Yeniköy, Balıkesir in Turkey. TCDD Taşımacılık operates two daily intercity trains from İzmir to Bandırma, the 6th of September Express and the 17th of September Express.
