= TCG Akhisar =

TCG Akhisar is the name of the following ships of the Turkish Navy named for Akhisar:

- Ottoman torpedo boat Akhisar, commissioned in 1904, became TCG Akhisar in 1923, stricken in 1930, and scrapped in 1935
- TCG Akhisar (P 114), ex-USS PC-1641
- TCG Akhisar (P 1220), a Hisar-class offshore patrol vessel launched in 2023, sold to Romania

== See also ==
Akhisar (disambiguation)
