= P114 =

P114 may refer to:

- ARM Jesús González Ortega (P114), a patrol boat of the Mexican Navy
- Papyrus 114, a biblical manuscript
- TCG Akhisar (P-114), a patrol boat of the Turkish Navy
- P114, a state regional road in Latvia
