= Çalıköy =

Çalıköy can refer to:

- Çalıköy railway station
- Çalıköy, Söke
- Çalıköy, Tavas
