= Kuşcenneti railway station =

Railway station in Bandırma, Turkey

Kuşcenneti

General information
- Location: Korozman Cd., 17 Eylül Mah. 10200; Bandırma, Balıkesir; Turkey
- Coordinates: 40.3368°N 27.9794°E
- System: TCDD intercity rail station
- Owner: Turkish State Railways
- Operator: TCDD Taşımacılık
- Line: 6 Sep Express 17 Sep Express
- Platforms: 2 (1 side platform, 1 island platform)
- Tracks: 2

Construction
- Structure type: At-grade
- Parking: Yes

History
- Electrified: 2017; 25 kV AC, 60 Hz

Services
Preceding station	TCDD Taşımacılık	Following station
Sığırcı towards İzmir (Basmane)	6 Sep Express	Bandırma Terminus
Aksakal towards İzmir (Basmane)	17 Sep Express	Bandırma Terminus
Location

Kuşcenneti railway station (Turkish: Kuşcenneti istasyonu) is a railway station in Bandırma, Turkey. The station is located in south Bandırma, near the Bandırma Airport. The station is used mostly as a yard for freight cars serving the nearby Etimaden Bohrium prossesing plant. TCDD Taşımacılık operates two daily intercity trains to İzmir; the northbound 6th of September Express and the southbound 17th of September Express.
