= Balıkesir–Bandırma Regional =

Overview
- Service type: Regional rail
- Status: Operating
- Locale: Northwestern Anatolia
- First service: 19 March 2016
- Current operator(s): Turkish State Railways

Route
- Termini: Balıkesir; Bandırma
- Distance travelled: 101.1 km (62.8 mi)
- Average journey time: 1 hour, 47 minutes
- Service frequency: Daily
- Train number(s): 32420/32421

Technical
- Track gauge: 1,435 mm (4 ft 8 1/2 in) standard gauge
- Track owner(s): TCDD

The Balıkesir–Bandırma Regional, numbered as B32 (Turkish: Balıkesir–Bandırma Bölgeseli), is a 101 km (63 mi) long passenger train operating daily between Balıkesir and Bandırma. The train is a temporary replacement for the 6th of September Express and the 17th of September Express which operate only between İzmir and Soma, due to a tunnel collapse on the Manisa-Bandırma railway. Once construction on rebuilding the tunnel is complete and regular train service from İzmir to Bandırma returns, the Balıkesir-Bandırma Regional will be discontinued.
