= Soma station (disambiguation) =

Soma station may refer to multiple railway stations:

- Soma Station in Japan
- Soma railway station in Turkey
