= Akhisar railway station (1890–2018) =

Former rail station in Turkey

Akhisar
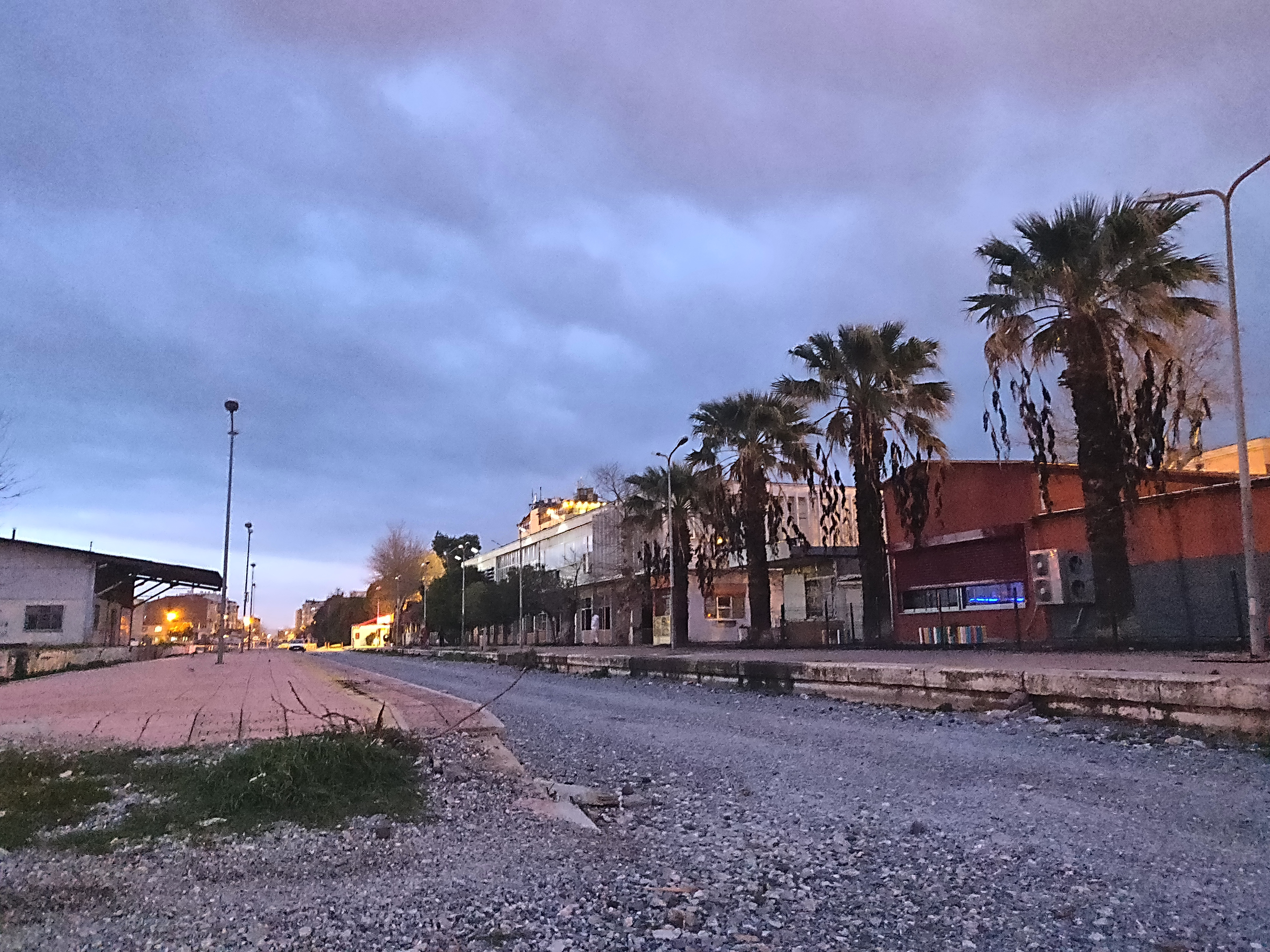
- The platforms of the former station, with the tracks torn up, in February 2021.

General information
- Location: D.565, Atatürk Mah., 45220 Akhisar/Manisa; Turkey
- Coordinates: 38.922370°N 27.833639°E
- Owner: Turkish State Railways
- Platforms: 2 side platforms
- Tracks: 2

History
- Opened: 1890
- Closed: 20 April 2018
- Electrified: 25 kV AC
Location

Akhisar railway station was a station in Akhisar, Turkey. Built in 1890 by the Smyrna Cassaba Railway, it remained in service until 2018, when a new station on the outskirts of the city. The station was closed on 20 April 2018 and the tracks were torn up shortly after, to much criticism.

The station was opened in 1890, by the Smyrna Cassaba Railway.
