= Marmara Express =

Passenger train in Turkey

Overview
- Service type: Inter-city rail
- Status: Discontinued
- Locale: Western Turkey
- Last service: 16 April 2004
- Successor: 6th of September Express
- Current operator: Turkish State Railways

Route
- Termini: Basmane Terminal, İzmir; Bandırma
- Distance travelled: 341.1 km (211.9 mi)
- Service frequency: Daily

Technical
- Track gauge: 1,435 mm (4 ft 8 1/2 in) standard gauge
- Track owner: TCDD

The Marmara Express was a passenger train operated by the Turkish State Railways between Basmane Terminal in İzmir and Bandırma. At Bandırma, the train offered a connection to İDO ferries to Istanbul, across the Marmara Sea. The Marmara Express was discontinued in 2004 due to the rehabilitation of the Manisa-Bandırma railway. On 21 February 2007, the 6 September Super Express began operating on the same route, however with limited stops.
