= USS PC-1641 =

Patrol boat of the US Navy

History

United States
- Name: PC-1641
- Builder: Gunderson Brothers Engineering Corp., Portland
- Laid down: 29 May 1963
- Launched: 14 May 1964
- Completed: 29 October 1964
- Commissioned: 3 December 1964
- Identification: Callsign: TBLP
- Fate: Transferred to Turkish Navy

Turkey
- Name: Akhisar
- Namesake: Akhisar
- Identification: Pennant number: P 114
- Status: Unknown

General characteristics
- Class & type: PC-1638-class submarine chaser; Hisar-class patrol boat
- Displacement: 295 tons (full load)
- Length: 175 ft (53 m)
- Beam: 23 ft (7.0 m)
- Draft: 10 ft 10 in (3.30 m)
- Propulsion: 2 x 2,400hp ALCO 169X 10AT diesel engines; 2 shafts
- Speed: 20 knots (37 km/h)
- Complement: 59
- Armament: 1 x Mk 15 ASW Hedgehog mortar; 1 × 40 mm gun; 3 × 20 mm cannons; 2 rocket launchers; 4 depth charge projectiles; 2 depth charge tracks

USS PC-1641 was an PC-1638-class submarine chaser in the United States Navy during the Cold War. She was transferred to the Turkish Navy as TCG Akhisar (P 114) of the Hisar-class patrol boat.

== Construction and commissioning ==
PC-1641 was laid down on 29 May 1963 at Gunderson Brothers Engineering Corps., Portland, Oregon. Launched on 14 May 1964.

She was transferred to the Turkish Navy and renamed TCG Akhisar (P 114).
