= Saruhanlı =

- District and municipality
- Map showing Saruhanlı District in Manisa Province

- Location in Turkey Saruhanlı (Turkey Aegean)
- Coordinates: 38°44′03″N 27°33′57″E
- Country: Turkey
- Province: Manisa

Government
  - Mayor: Ekrem Cıllı (AKP)
- Area: 771 km^{2} (298 sq mi)
- Elevation: 32 m (105 ft)
- Population (2022): 56,523
  - Density: 73.3/km^{2} (190/sq mi)
- Time zone: UTC+3 (TRT)
- Area code: 0236
- Website: www.saruhanli.bel.tr

Saruhanlı is a municipality and district of Manisa Province, Turkey. Its area is 771 km^{2}, and its population is 56,523 (2022). The town lies at an elevation of 32 m (105 ft).

== Agriculture ==
Olive, walnut and almond cultivation is among the important agricultural activities of Saruhanlı.

== Composition ==
There are 50 neighbourhoods in Saruhanlı District:

- Adiloba
- Alibeyli
- Apak
- Atatürk
- Aydınlar
- Azimli
- Bahadır
- Bedeller
- Büyükbelen
- Çakmaklı
- Çaltepe
- Çamlıyurt
- Cengiz Topel
- Çerkez Osmaniye
- Çınaroba
- Çullugörece
- Cumhuriyet
- Develi
- Dilek
- Gökçeköy
- Gözlet
- Gümülceli
- Hacımusa
- Hacırahmanlı
- Halitpaşa
- Hatipler
- Heybeli
- İshakçelebi
- İstasyon
- Kayışlar
- Kemiklidere
- Kepenekli
- Koldere
- Koyuncu
- Kumkuyucak
- Kurtuluş
- Lütfiye
- Mütevelli
- Nuriye
- Paşa
- Pınarbaşı
- Sarıçam
- Sarısığırlı
- Saruhan
- Şatırlar
- Şehitler
- Seyitoba
- Taşdibi
- Tirkeş
- Yılmaz
