= Karesi Express =

Train service in Turkey

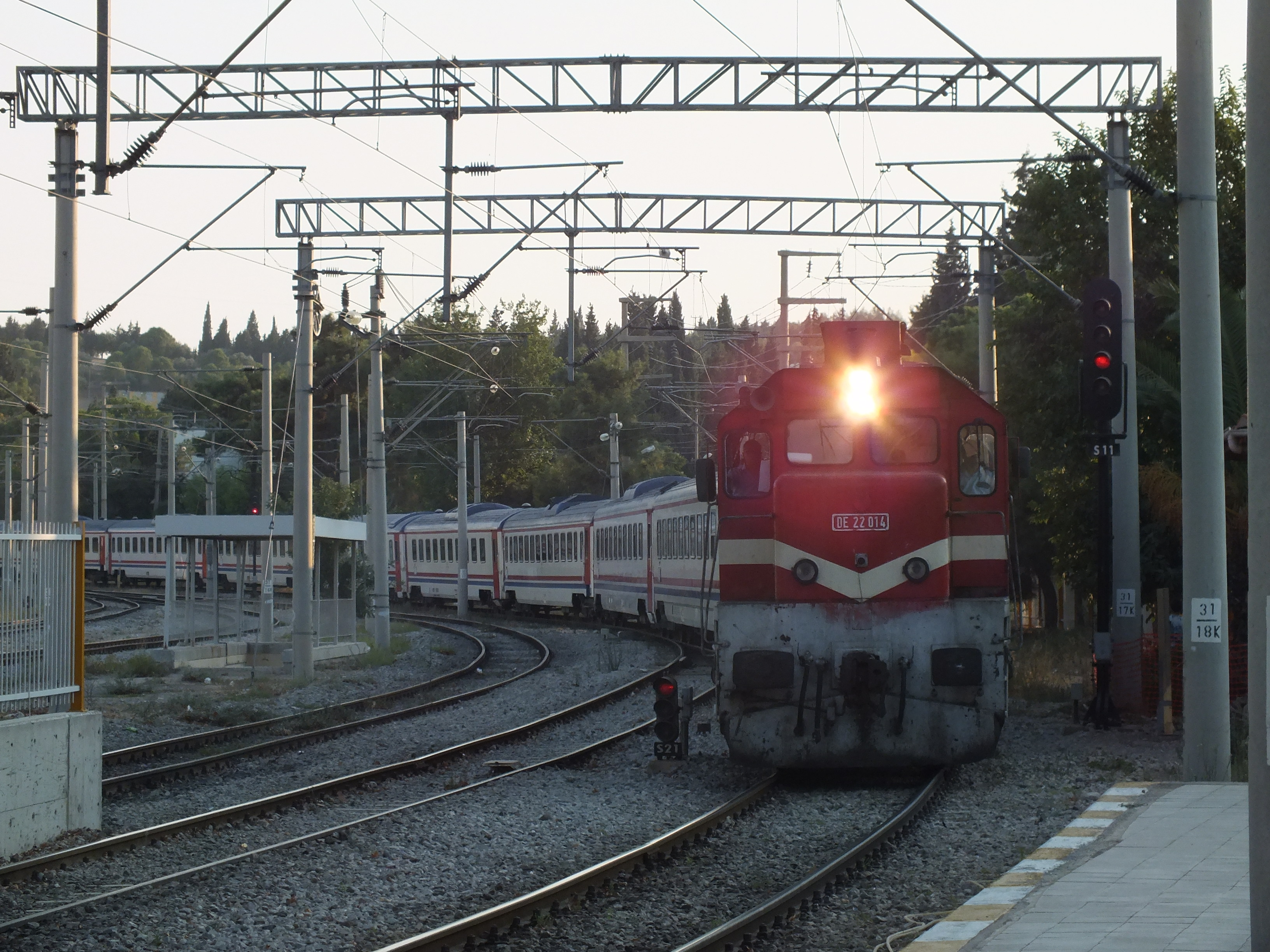
- An Ankara bound Karesi Express rounds the curve at Menemen before arriving at the station.

Overview
- Service type: Intercity rail
- Status: Service temporarily suspended
- Locale: Western Turkey
- First service: 23 April 1938
- Last service: 12 March 2020 (Service suspended)
- Current operator: TCDD Taşımacılık
- Former operator: Turkish State Railways

Route
- Termini: Basmane Terminal, İzmir; Central Station, Ankara
- Stops: 44
- Distance travelled: 824 km (512 mi)
- Average journey time: 14 hours, 45 minutes (Eastbound); 14 hours, 16 minutes (Westbound)
- Service frequency: Daily each way
- Train numbers: 31315 (Eastbound); 21316 (Westbound)

On-board services
- Disabled access: Limited
- Seating arrangements: Coach Seating
- Catering facilities: Dining car
- Baggage facilities: At select stations

Technical
- Rolling stock: TVS2000
- Track gauge: 1,435 mm (4 ft 8 1/2 in)
- Electrification: 25 kV AC
- Operating speed: 120 km/h (75 mph)
- Track owner: TCDD

The Karesi Express(Turkish: Karesi Ekspresi) was an overnight train, operating between Alsancak Terminal, İzmir and Central Station, Ankara. The train was one of two current train services between İzmir and Ankara. The eastbound journey took about 14 hours and 16 minutes, while the westbound journey took about 14 hours and 45 minutes. The Karesi Express serviced 6 provincial capitals: İzmir, Manisa, Balıkesir, Kütahya, Eskişehir and Ankara.

When the Turkish State Railways opened the Balıkesir-Kütahya rail line on April 23, 1938 (connecting the former SCP and the CFOA lines), rail travel between İzmir and Ankara was possible. Ankara is the capital of Turkey while İzmir is the 3rd largest city in Turkey (2nd largest at the time), making transport between the two cities heavy. On April 23, 1938 the Karesi Express made its first run from İzmir to Ankara. The all pullman train made the 824 km long journey in about 18 hours. On April 1, 1972, another train was put into service between İzmir and Ankara: the 9th of September Express. This train however had a sleeping car. In 1980 the third train was put in service: The İzmir Blue Train.

On 1 April 2013 the route of the Karesi Express was cut back to Balıkesir. Since 2013 the train operates as a regional train between İzmir and Balıkesir.

Due to the COVID-19 pandemic, the Karesi Express was suspended on 12 March 2020.

== Name ==
The name "Karaesi Express" comes from the beylik of Karasi, that had its capital city in Balıkesir, a city which the Karesi Express passes through.

== Consist ==
The consist of the train has changed many times through the years, since the first 4 car train left Ankara in 1938. These changes usually happen because of other trains being put into or removed from service. Between 2016 and 2020 the consisted usually was:

- TCDD E68000
- 5 TVS2000 Coaches

Between 2001 and 2016 the consist was:

- DE22000
- TVS2000 Generator Car
- 4 Intercity coaches
- Intercity diner
- Intercity couchette

The first consist that began service on April 23, 1938 consisted of:

- Steam locomotive
- Coach
- Coach
- Diner/Coach
- Couchette

== Gallery ==
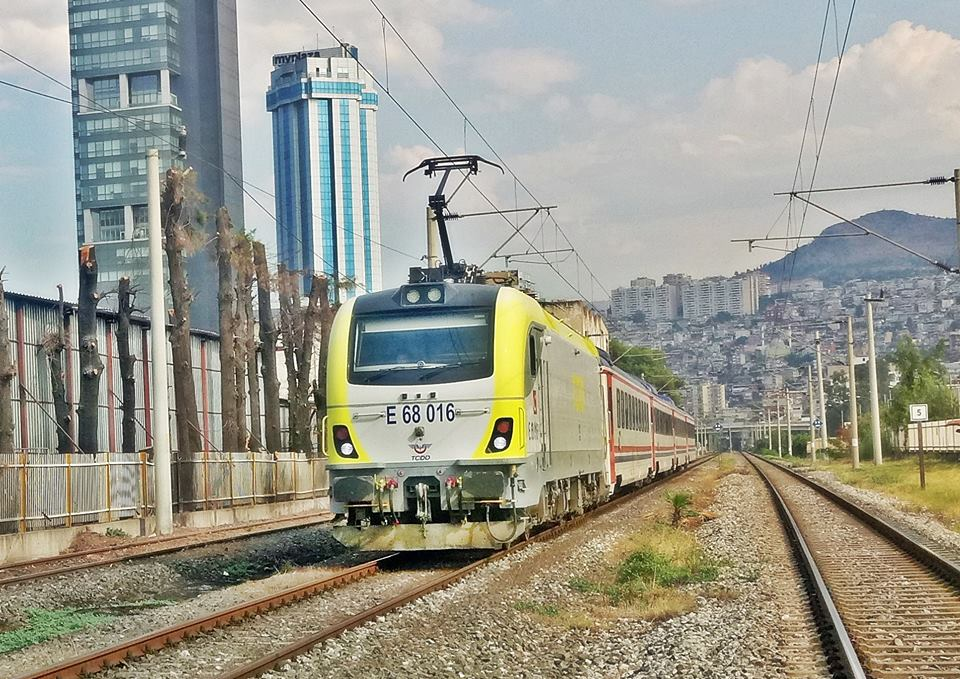
E68016 pulling a northbound train in Izmir.
