= Aegean Express =

Passenger train operating daily between İzmir and Eskişehir

Overview
- Service type: Intercity rail
- Status: Operating
- Locale: Western Turkey
- Current operator: TCDD Taşımacılık
- Former operator: Turkish State Railways

Route
- Termini: Basmane station, İzmir; Eskișehir station, Eskişehir
- Stops: 32
- Distance travelled: 569 km (354 mi)
- Average journey time: 10 hours, 27 minutes (Eastbound); 10 hours, 12 minutes (Westbound)
- Service frequency: Daily

On-board services
- Disabled access: Limited
- Seating arrangements: Coach seating
- Catering facilities: Trolley catering service
- Entertainment facilities: TCDD promotional video loop is shown in the in-train entertainment displays

Technical
- Rolling stock: Coach cars hauled by electric loco
- Track gauge: 1,435 mm (4 ft 8 1/2 in) standard gauge
- Operating speed: 120 kilometres per hour (75 mph)
- Track owner: Turkish State Railways

The Aegean Express, numbered as B31 (Turkish: Ege Ekspresi), is a passenger train operating daily between Basmane railway station in İzmir to Eskişehir. The train operates as a local service on the route, calling at more stations than its counterpart, the Karesi Express; which also operates between İzmir and Balıkesir.

Originally the train operated between İzmir and Eskişehir, via Balıkesir and Kütahya, as a daily inter-city train. The route was then changed to Afyon, also via Balıkesir and Kütahya and in 2013 it was shortened to a regional train service between İzmir and Balıkesir. Then re-extended to Eskişehir

== Overview ==
The northbound Aegean Express departs İzmir in the morning at 6:45, arriving at Eskişehir at 17:13; while the southbound train departs Eskişehir at 8:30 and arrives in İzmir at 19:08.

The train mainly services small towns and villages along the Manisa-Bandırma railway.

== History ==
The direct predecessor of the Aegean Express was the Aegean Mototren, which operated between İzmir and Ankara between 1951 and 1978.

The Aegean Express was one of four daily trains operating between İzmir and Eskişehir. Out of these four trains, the Agean Express operated during the day, while the other three trains, Karesi Express, 9th of September Express and the İzmir Blue Train, operated overnight and continued east from Eskişehir to Ankara. Scheduled departure from Basmane Terminal in İzmir was at 6:45 and scheduled arrival in Eskişehir was at 18:25 while scheduled departure from Eskişehir was at 7:30 and scheduled arrival in İzmir was at 18:49, however the Aegean Express is famous for its delays and would arrive on average at its final destination 78 minutes late.

Service to Basmane Terminal was suspended on 3 March 2006 due to the construction of the Karşıyaka tunnel. The Aegean Express terminated at Çiğli (17 km (11 mi) from Basmane Terminal), along with other trains from the north, and connection to railway stations in the city were offered by ESHOT replacement bus service. In early-2008 the İzmir terminus was pushed further north to Ulukent. During this period, trains would layover at Menemen. Due to the rehabilitation of the Eskişehir-Konya railway, the Aegean Express was cut back by 76 km (47 mi) to Kütahya in July 2008. Two months later, in September 2008, the train was extended 105 km (65 mi) south to Afyon as a replacement to regional service between Alayunt and Afyon. On 25 May 2010, inter-city service from the north was brought back to center terminals in İzmir; however due to route changes, the Aegean Express would terminate at Alsancak Terminal instead of Basmane, along with all other trains from the north.

When construction to modernize the Balıkesir-Kütahya railway started in 2013, the Aegean Express was shorted by 256 km (159 mi) to Balıkesir. The Karesi Express was also shorted from Ankara to Balıkesir and currently operates as a regional train, along with the Aegean Express, between İzmir and Balıkesir.

== Route details ==
The Aegean Express operates on the following railways in Turkey:

- İzmir–Afyon railway - Basmane terminal to Manisa
- Manisa-Bandırma railway - Manisa to Balıkesir
- Balıkesir-Kütahya railway - Balıkesir to Kütahya
