= Bandırma railway station =

Railway station in Bandırma, Turkey

Bandırma
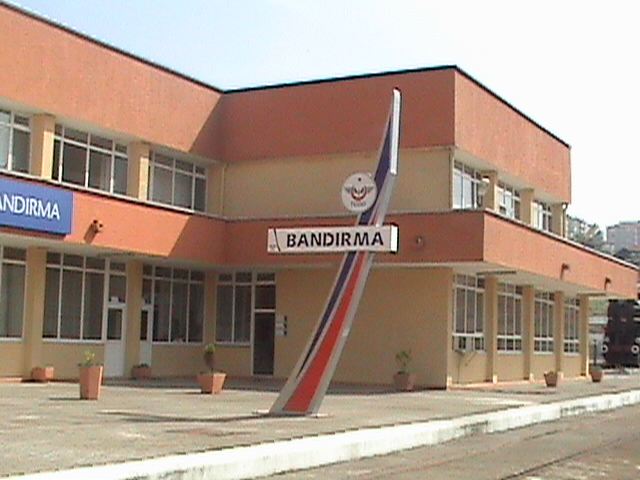
- Bandırma station building.

General information
- Location: M. Akif Ersoy Cd., Paşabayır Mah., 10200; Bandırma/Balıkesir; Turkey
- Coordinates: 40.3520°N 27.9658°E
- System: TCDD Taşımacılık intercity rail station
- Owner: Turkish State Railways
- Operator: TCDD Taşımacılık
- Line: 6 Sep Express 17 Sep Express
- Platforms: 2 bay platforms
- Tracks: 3
- Connections: İDO at Bandırma Terminal

Construction
- Structure type: At-grade
- Parking: Yes

Other information
- Station code: 3532

History
- Opened: 1969
- Closed: 2004-07

Services
Preceding station	TCDD Taşımacılık	Following station
Kuşcenneti towards İzmir (Basmane)	6 Sep Express	Terminus
Kuşcenneti towards İzmir (Basmane)	17 Sep Express	Terminus
Location

Bandırma railway station is the main railway station in Bandırma, Turkey. It is located within the Port of Bandırma, adjacent to the Bandırma Ferry Terminal. It is the northern terminus of the 6th of September Express and the 17th of September Express, which operate daily to İzmir. Bandırma station is located at the end of a short branch with entry only from the north, requiring trains to back up into the station from the mainline at Bandırma Şehir station.

The station was built in 1969 along with the Port of Bandırma, replacing the older railway station, built in 1913, located further down the shore.

Bandırma station consists of two bay platforms serving three tracks.

The TCDD 45051 steam engine is preserved on the station.
