= Smyrne Cassaba & Prolongements =

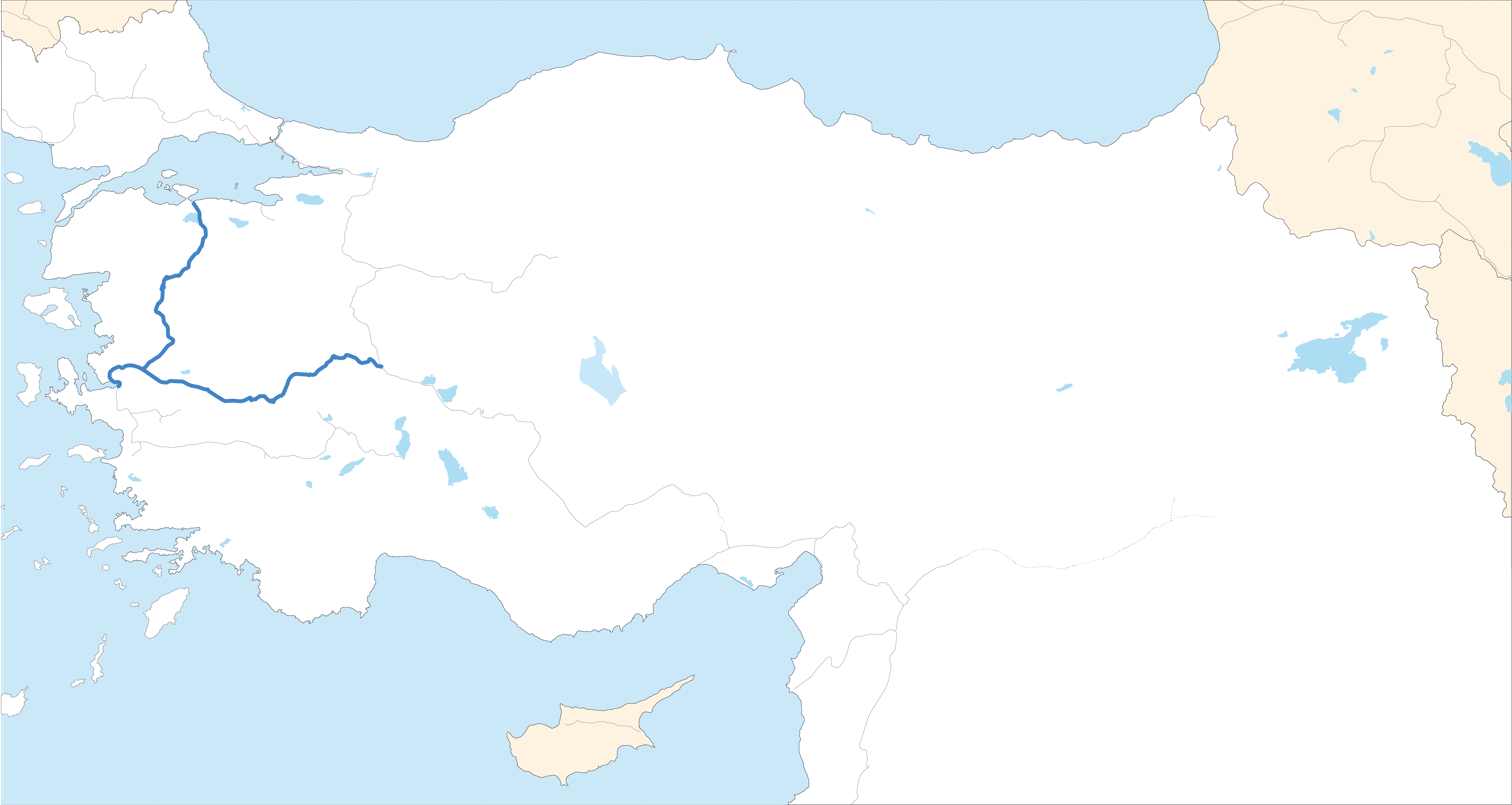
- Map of the SCP system in 1912.

Overview
- Headquarters: Smyrna
- Reporting mark: SCR, SCP
- Locale: Western Anatolia, Smyrna to Afyon, and Bandırma
- Dates of operation: 1863–1934
- Successor: State Railways Administration, district 3

Technical
- Track gauge: 4 ft 8 1/2 in (1,435 mm) standard gauge

The Smyrne Cassaba & Prolongements (English:Smyrna Cassaba & Prolongations), formerly The Smyrna Cassaba Railway, was a railway company operating in Western Anatolia from 1863 to 1934.

== History ==
The Ottoman Government gave a concession to build a railway from Smyrna to Cassaba on July 4, 1863. The concession was awarded to an English company "The Smyrna Cassaba Railway". The railway chose to have their terminus closer to Smyrna's city center. Construction began ın 1864. The rail line opened to Manisa on October 10, 1865 and to Cassaba on January 10, 1866. The SCR then built a line to Bornova (splitting from the main line at Halkapınar), which opened on October 25, 1866. They were going to extend the line to Cassaba, but the SCR went bankrupt during the stock market crash in 1866. The SCR recovered after a second concession to Alaşehir. SCR completed the line to Alaşehir in 1875, however the construction was funded by the Ottoman Government. A third concession was awarded to the SCR in 1887 to build a branch to Soma from Manisa. This was completed in 1890 but the Ottoman Government once again financed the construction. The Ottoman Government always in need of finance decided to rationalize the structure of the Smyrna Cassaba Railway. It exercised its right to purchase the concession and the part of the line it not already owned. The concession was then sold to Georges Nagelmackers, the founder the International Sleeping Car Company on February 17, 1893. The railway operation was transferred on 12 July 1893 to a new French company, the "Société Ottomane du Chemin de fer de Smyrne-Cassaba et Prolongements" (SCP), which was founded on July 16, 1893. The SCP received a concession to build from Alaşehir to Afyon. The SCP made an agreement with the Central Railway of Anatolia (CFOA) to connect the SCP's line with theirs at Afyon. The line to Afyon was completed in 1899. The SCP continued the line from Soma to Bandırma, which was completed in 1912. This became the shortest route between İzmir and Istanbul via ferry connection at Bandırma. After the Republic of Turkey was formed in 1923, Turkey nationalized all railways in the country and in 1934 the SCP was taken over by the Turkish State Railways.
