= İzmir Blue Train =

Overview
- Service type: Intercity rail
- Status: Operating
- Locale: Western Turkey
- First service: 17 May 1984
- Current operator: TCDD Taşımacılık
- Former operator: Turkish State Railways
- Website: https://www.tcddtasimacilik.gov.tr/en/main_line_trains/detail/29

Route
- Termini: Basmane station, İzmir; Ankara station, Ankara
- Stops: 35
- Distance travelled: 824 km (512 mi)
- Average journey time: 14 hours
- Service frequency: Daily each way
- Train numbers: 31127 (eastbound); 21128 (westbound)

On-board services
- Classes: Classless coach 1st class sleeper
- Disabled access: Limited
- Seating arrangements: Coach seating
- Sleeping arrangements: Sleeping car
- Catering facilities: Dining car
- Entertainment facilities: TCDD music service

Technical
- Rolling stock: TVS2000
- Track gauge: 1,435 mm (4 ft 8 1/2 in)
- Electrification: Yes
- Operating speed: 120 km/h (75 mph)
- Track owner: TCDD Taşımacılık

The İzmir Blue Train (Turkish: İzmir Mavi Tren) is one of the 3, still operating, "Blue Train" services.

The train made its first run on 17 May 1984. At first, the train was operating between Alsancak station in İzmir and Central Station in Ankara. But in 2006, due to construction works of IZBAN, the terminus in Izmir was transferred to Basmane station but remained there even after the IZBAN went into service. And since 2016, the eastern terminus of the service was shortened to Eskişehir due to the Başkentray project. In 2018, service started back between Ankara-İzmir.
