= 6th of September Express =

Passenger rail service in western Turkey

Overview
- Service type: Intercity rail
- Status: Service temporarily suspended
- Locale: Western Turkey
- Predecessor: Marmara Express
- First service: 1 September 2007
- Current operator: TCDD Taşımacılık
- Former operator: Turkish State Railways

Route
- Termini: Basmane Terminal, İzmir; Bandırma station, Balıkesir
- Stops: 20
- Distance travelled: 341 km (212 mi)
- Average journey time: 8 hours, 15 minutes
- Service frequency: Twice daily, each way (One as 6th September and one as 17th September)

On-board services
- Class: Coach class
- Disabled access: Limited
- Seating arrangements: 2+1

Technical
- Rolling stock: TVS2000
- Track gauge: 1,435 mm (4 ft 8 1/2 in)
- Electrification: Yes
- Operating speed: 120 km/h (75 mph)
- Track owner: Turkish State Railways

The 6th of September Express (Turkish: 6 Eylül Ekspresi) is a 368 km (229 mi) long daily passenger train operated by TCDD Taşımacılık. The train runs from Basmane Terminal in İzmir to Soma, Manisa in western Turkey. The train provides local service on between the two destinations and the total scheduled time of a trip is 3 hours and 33 minutes.

The 6th of September Express was inaugurated on 1 September 2007, as a second train service from İzmir to Bandırma. Following a tunnel collapse on 5 March 2016, the train was temporarily cut back to Soma. Once the tunnel was rebuilt and train service returned, the 6th of September Express continued to operate only to Soma for a year. It is now extended to its former terminus.

Due to the COVID-19 pandemic, the 6th of September Express was suspended on 12 March 2021.
