= Baccheius =

Baccheius or Bacchius (Ancient Greek: Βακχεῖος) is a Greek name and may refer to:

- Baccheius the Elder, writer on musical theory
- Bacchius of Tanagra, a commentator on the writings of Hippocrates
- Baccheius of Miletus, a writer. He wrote a work on agriculture.
- Bacchius, a gladiator
- Bacchius, grandfather of Justin Martyr
- Baccheius, an epithet of a wooden statue of Bacchus in Acrocorinth
- Baccheius, an epithet of Dionysus
