= Miletus =

Ancient Greek city in Anatolia

- Μῑ́λητος; Milet
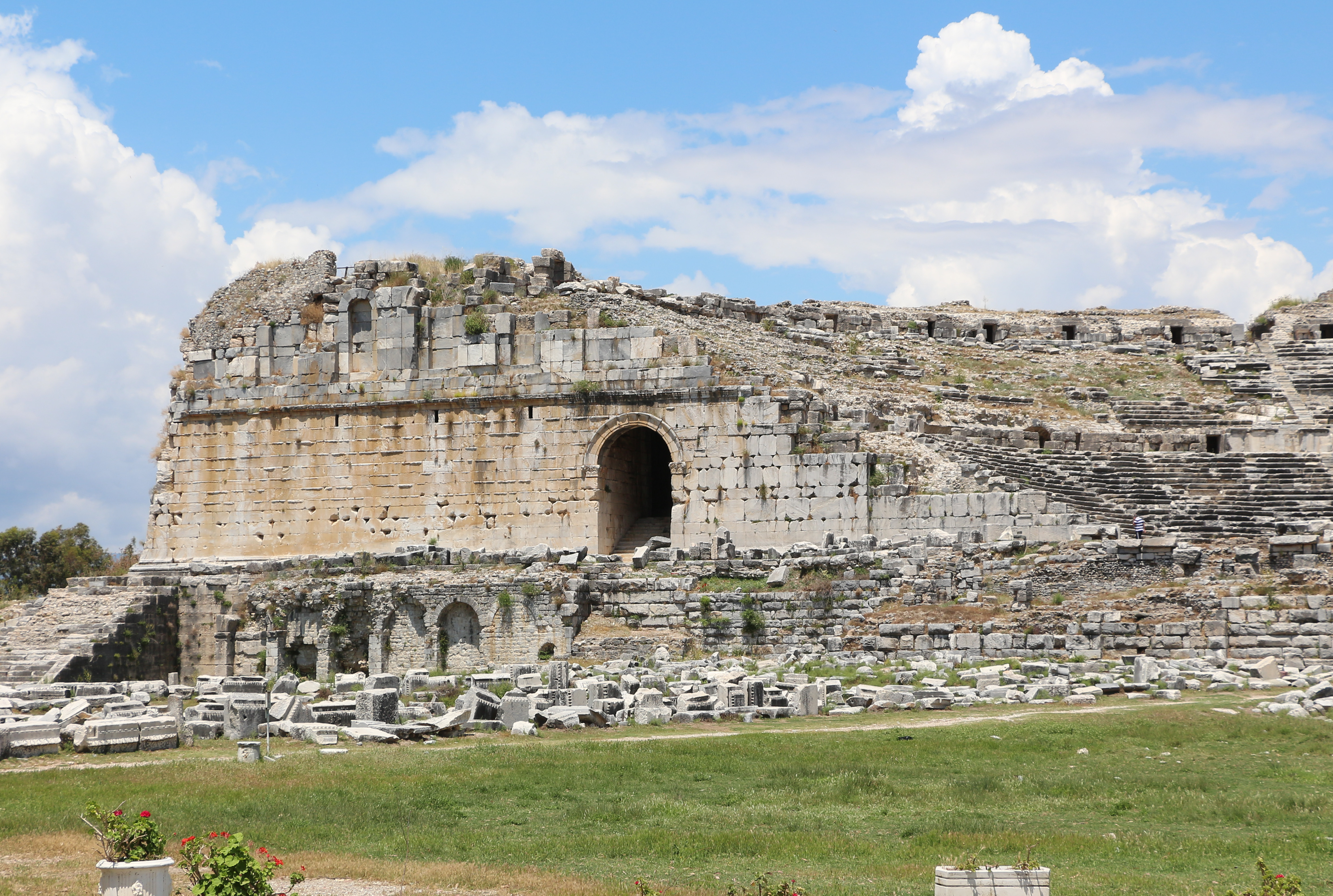

- Location within Turkey
- 37°31′49″N 27°16′42″E
- Type: Settlement
- Location: Balat, Didim, Aydın Province, Turkey
- Region: Aegean Region

History
- Built by: Minoans (later Mycenaeans) and then Ionians (the later on a former Anatolian site)

Site notes
- Area: 90 ha (220 acres)
- Public access: Yes
- Website: Miletus Archaeological Site

Miletus (Ancient Greek: Μίλητος, romanised: Mílētos) was an influential ancient Greek city on the western coast of Anatolia, near the mouth of the Maeander River in present day Turkey. Renowned in antiquity for its wealth, maritime power, and extensive network of colonies, Miletus was a major center of trade, culture, and innovation from the Bronze Age through the Roman period. The city played a foundational role in the development of early Greek philosophy and science, serving as the home of the Milesian school with thinkers such as Thales, Anaximander, and Anaximenes.

Miletus's prosperity was closely linked to its strategic coastal location and the productivity of its surrounding rural hinterland, which supported thriving agriculture and facilitated wide-ranging commercial activity. The city established dozens of colonies around the Mediterranean and Black Sea, significantly shaping the Greek world's expansion.

Archaeological investigations have revealed a rich material culture, including the sanctuary of Apollo at Didyma, remnants of the city's distinctive grid plan, and evidence of long-term agricultural and rural management. Throughout its history, Miletus experienced periods of autonomy and foreign rule, serving as a cultural crossroads between Greek, Anatolian, and later Persian and Roman spheres. The city's enduring legacy is reflected in its contributions to philosophy, urban planning, and the spread of Greek civilization.

== History ==
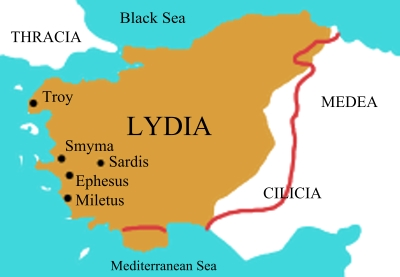
Map of Miletus and other cities within the Lydian Empire

=== Neolithic ===
Archaeology indicates that the islands around Miletus were inhabited by a Neolithic population in 3500–3000 BC. Pollen in core samples from Lake Bafa in the Latmus region inland of Miletus suggests that a lightly grazed climax forest prevailed in the Maeander valley, otherwise untenanted. Sparse Neolithic settlements were made at springs, numerous and sometimes geothermal in this karst, rift valley topography. The islands offshore were settled perhaps for their strategic significance at the mouth of the Maeander, a route inland protected by escarpments. The graziers in the valley may have belonged to them, but the location looked to the sea.

=== Middle Bronze Age ===
The prehistoric archaeology of the Early and Middle Bronze Age portrays a city heavily influenced by society and events elsewhere in the Aegean, rather than inland.

==== Minoan period ====
The earliest Minoan settlement of Miletus dates to 2000 BC. Beginning at about 1900 BC artifacts of the Minoan civilization acquired by trade arrived at the site. For some centuries the location received a strong impulse from that civilization, an archaeological fact that tends to support but not necessarily confirm the founding legend—that is, a population influx from Crete. According to Strabo:

Ephorus says: Miletus was first founded and fortified above the sea by Cretans, where the Miletus of olden times is now situated, being settled by Sarpedon, who brought colonists from the Cretan Miletus and named the city after that Miletus, the place formerly being in possession of the Leleges.

According to Pausanias, however, Miletus was a friend of Sarpedon from Crete, after whom the city was named. Miletus had a son named Kelados, and the heroon of Kelados has been found at Panormos, a port of Miletus near Didyma.

=== Late Bronze Age ===
Recorded history at Miletus begins with the records of the Hittite Empire and the Mycenaean records of Pylos and Knossos, in the Late Bronze Age.

==== Mycenaean period ====
Miletus was a Mycenaean stronghold on the coast of Asia Minor from c. 1450 to 1100 BC. In c. 1320 BC, the city supported an anti-Hittite rebellion of Uhha-Ziti of nearby Arzawa. Muršili ordered his generals Mala-Ziti and Gulla to raid Millawanda, and they proceeded to burn parts of it; damage from LHIIIA found on-site has been associated with this raid. In addition the town was fortified according to a Hittite plan.

Miletus is then mentioned in the "Tawagalawa letter", part of a series including the Manapa-Tarhunta letter and the Milawata letter, all of which are less securely dated. The Tawagalawa letter notes that Milawata had a governor, Atpa, who was under the jurisdiction of Ahhiyawa (a growing state probably in LHIIIB Mycenaean Greece); and that the town of Atriya was under Milesian jurisdiction. The Manapa-Tarhunta letter also mentions Atpa. Together the two letters tell that the adventurer Piyama-Radu had humiliated Manapa-Tarhunta before Atpa (in addition to other misadventures); a Hittite king then chased Piyama-Radu into Millawanda and, in the Tawagalawa letter, requested Piyama-Radu's extradition to Hatti.

The Milawata letter mentions a joint expedition by the Hittite king and a Luwian vassal (probably Kupanta-Kurunta of Mira) against Miletus, and notes that the city (together with Atriya) was now under Hittite control.

Homer mentions that during the time of the Trojan War, Miletus was an ally of Troy and was city of the Carians, under Nastes and Amphimachus.

In the last stage of LHIIIB, the citadel of Bronze Age Pylos counted among its female slaves a mi-ra-ti-ja, Mycenaean Greek for "women from Miletus", written in Linear B syllabic script.

==== Fall of Miletus ====
During the collapse of Bronze Age civilization, Miletus was burnt again, presumably by the Sea Peoples.

=== Dark Age ===
Mythographers told that Neleus, a son of Codrus the last King of Athens, had come to Miletus after the "Return of the Heraclids" (so, during the Greek Dark Ages). A heroon for Neleus was allegedly located outside of the city wall of Roman Miletus, which probably marks the former city center contemporary to Neleus. The Ionians killed the men of Miletus and married their Carian widows. This is the mythical commencement of the enduring alliance between Athens and Miletus, which played an important role in the subsequent Persian Wars.

=== Archaic period ===
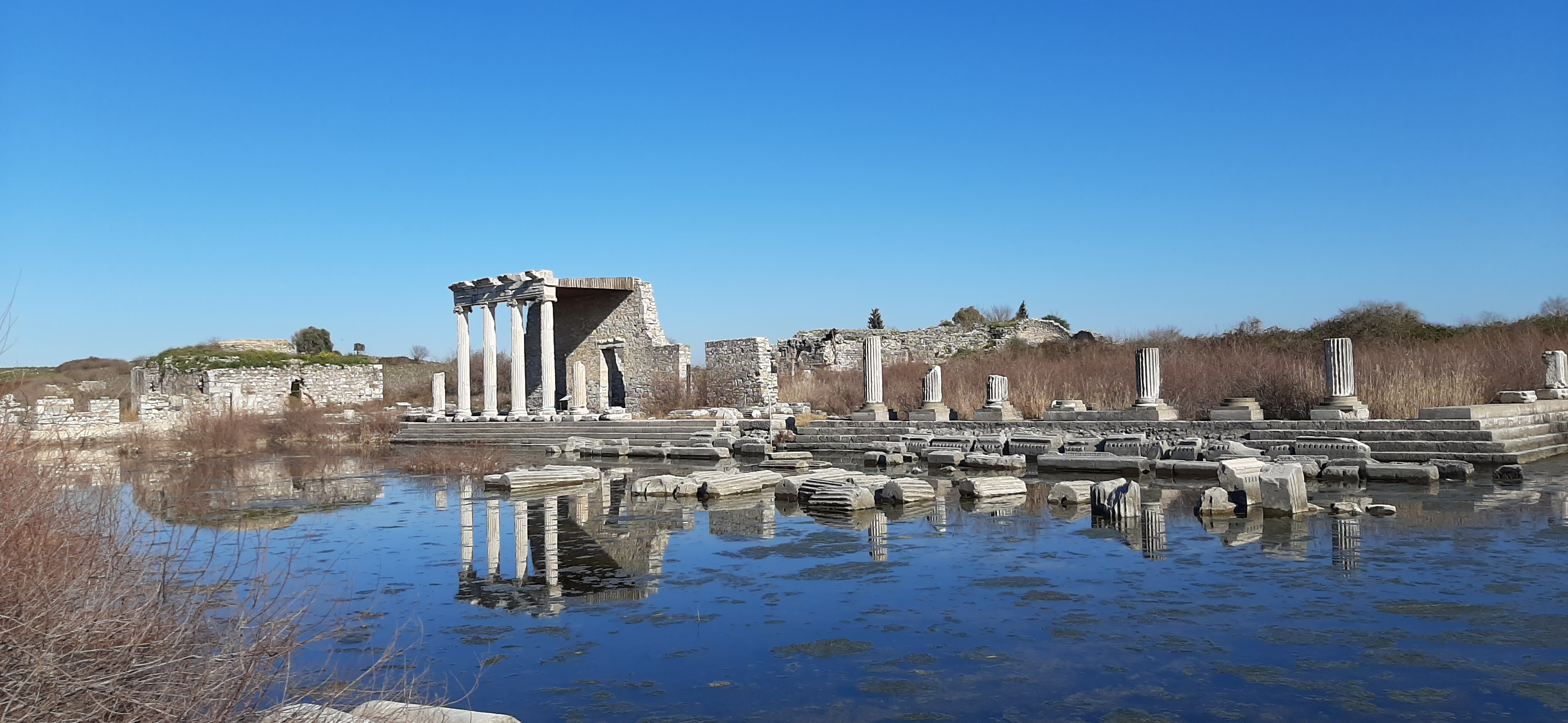
The Ionic Stoa on the Sacred Way in Miletus

The city of Miletus became one of the twelve Ionian city-states of Asia Minor to form the Ionian League.

Miletus was one of the cities involved in the Lelantine War of the 8th century BC.

==== Ties with Megara ====
Miletus is known to have early ties with Megara in Greece. According to some scholars, these two cities had built up a "colonisation alliance" in the 7th/6th century BC.

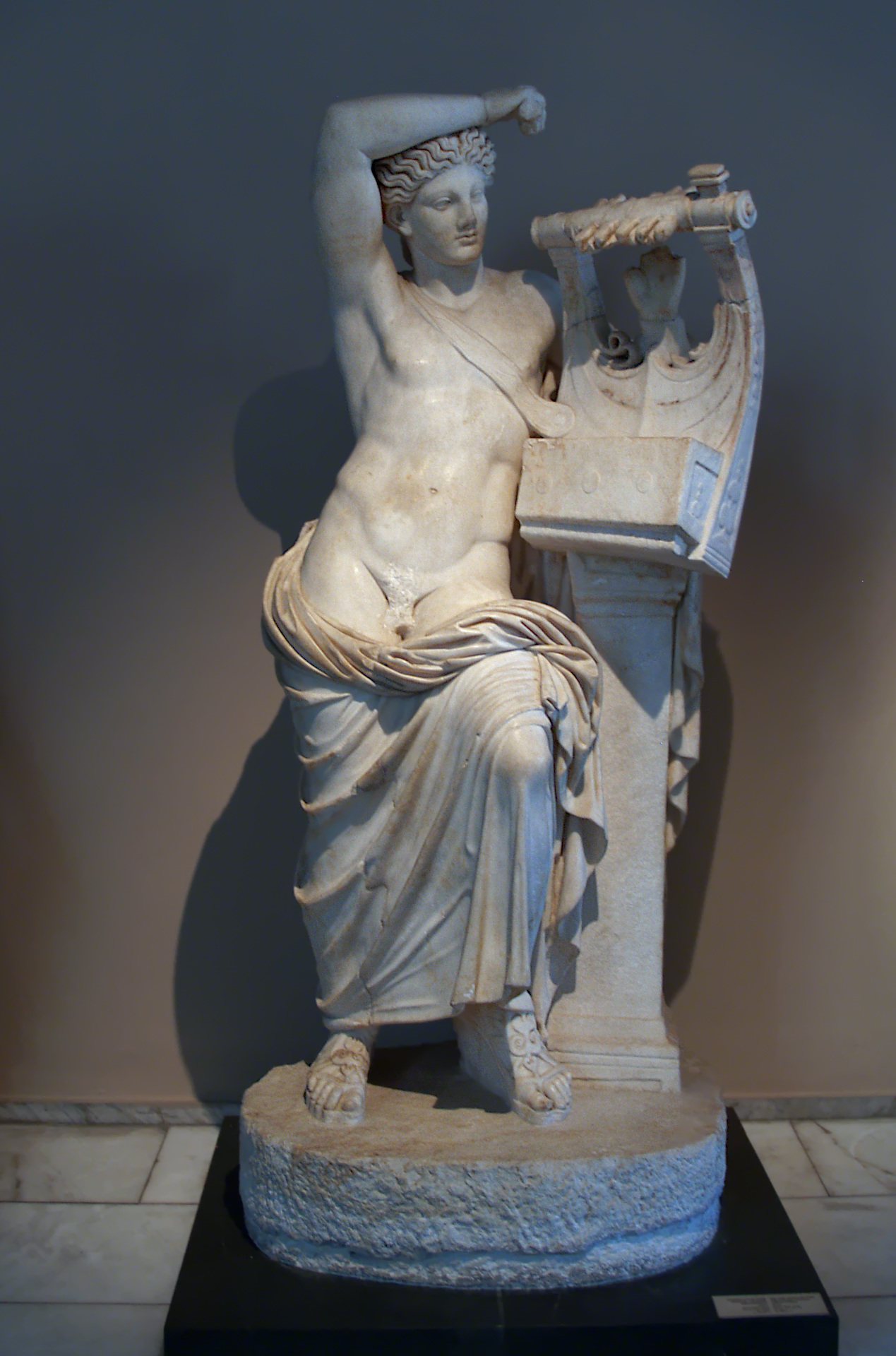
Apollo statue found in Miletus

Both cities acted under the leadership and sanction of an Apollo oracle. Megara cooperated with that of Delphi. Miletus had her own oracle of Apollo Didymeus Milesios in Didyma. Also, there are many parallels in the political organization of both cities.

According to Pausanias, the Megarians said that their town owed its origin to Car, the son of Phoroneus, who built the city citadel called 'Caria'. This 'Car of Megara' may or may not be the same as the 'Car of the Carians,' also known as Car (King of Caria).

In the late 7th century BC, the tyrant Thrasybulus preserved the independence of Miletus during a 12-year war fought against the Lydian Empire. Thrasybulus was an ally of the famous Corinthian tyrant Periander.

Miletus was an important centre of philosophy and science, producing such men as Thales, Anaximander, and Anaximenes. Referring to this period, religious studies professor F. E. Peters described pan-deism as "the legacy of the Milesians". As well as being a philosopher, Thales was also suggested to have initiated the famous grid plan of the city. An archaic orthogonal street system at Miletus has been confirmed by archaeological survey, but this system would not cover the entire urban centre of Miletus until the classical period.

By the 6th century BC, Miletus had earned a maritime empire with many colonies, mainly scattered around the Black Sea. Miletus and its numerous colonies were culturally tied by, for example, the cult of Aphrodite, a deity associated with seafaring in the cultural context of Miletus.

=== First Achaemenid period ===
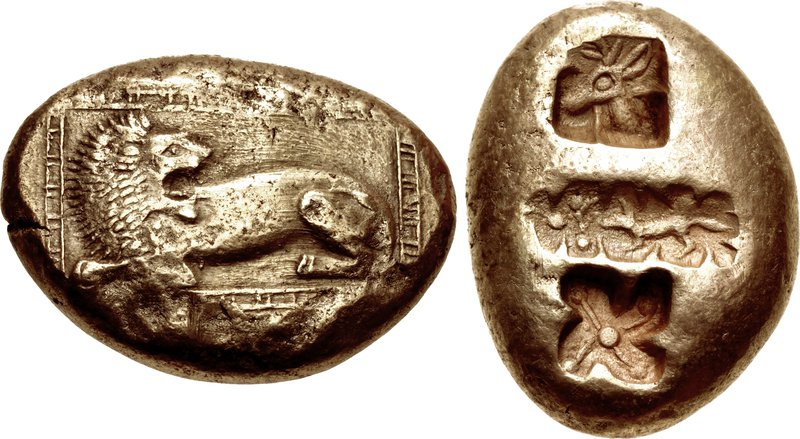
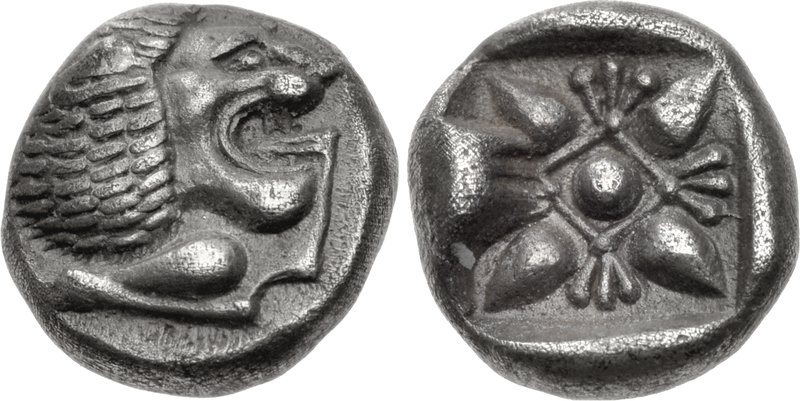
Top: Electrum coinage of Miletus c. 600–550 BC; Bottom: coinage c. 550–450 BC

When Cyrus of Persia defeated Croesus of Lydia in the middle of the 6th century BC, Miletus fell under Persian rule. In 499 BC, Miletus's tyrant Aristagoras became the leader of the Ionian Revolt against the Persians, who, under Darius the Great, quashed this rebellion in the Battle of Lade in 494 BC and punished Miletus by selling all of the women and children into slavery, killing the men, and expelling all of the young men as eunuchs, thereby assuring that no Miletus citizen would ever be born again. A year afterward, Phrynicus produced the tragedy The Capture of Miletus in Athens. The Athenians fined him for reminding them of their loss.

=== Classical Greek period ===
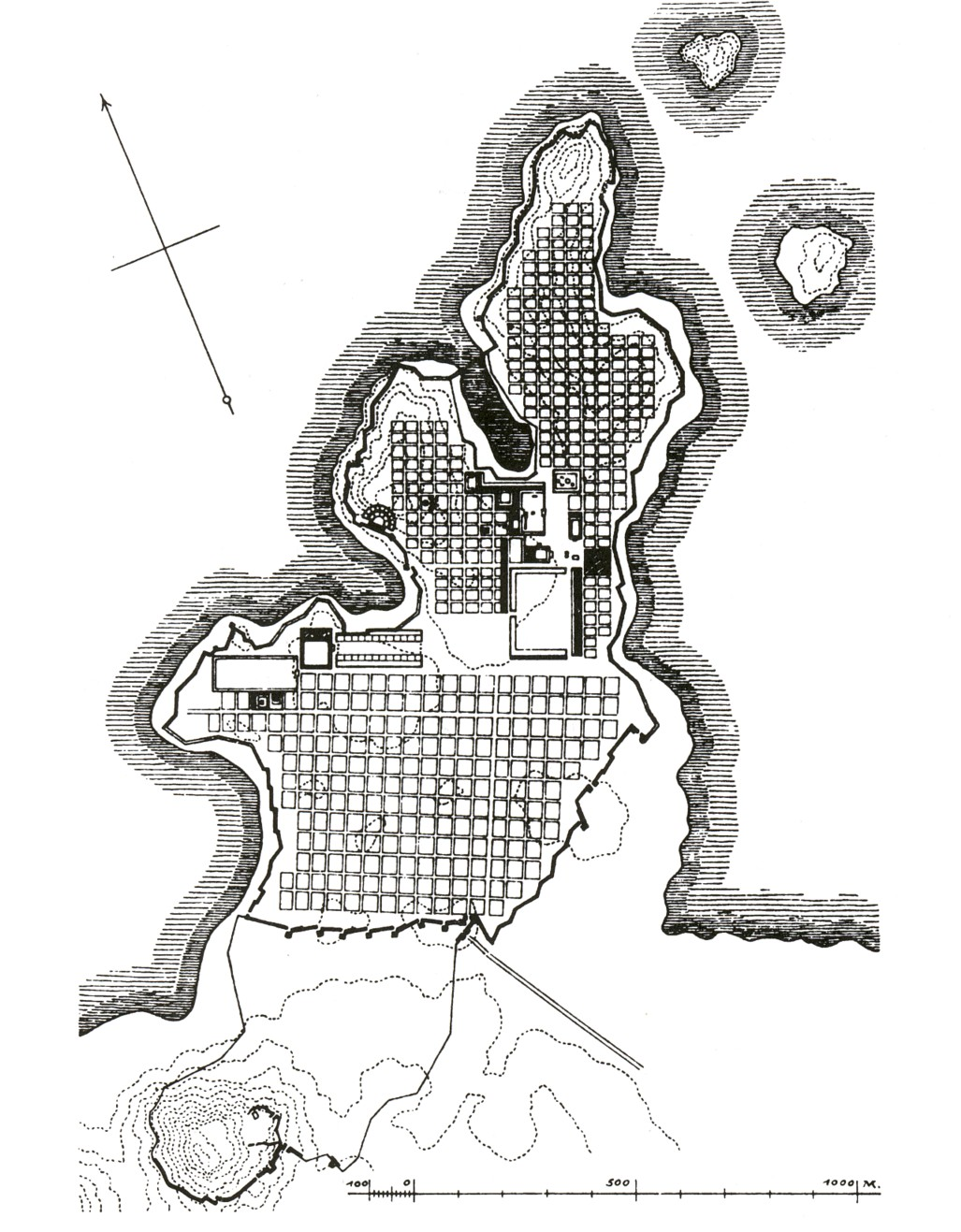
Plan of Miletus in the Classical period

In 479 BC, the Greeks decisively defeated the Persians on the Greek mainland at the Battle of Plataea, and Miletus was freed from Persian rule.

Although many sanctuaries of Miletus had been destroyed by the Persians, their restoration was prohibited by the "Oath of the Ionians", which aimed to retain the ruins as memorials. However, this oath was only partially observed by the Milesians, with some sanctuaries being restored to their Archaic appearances. The city's gridlike layout designed by Hippodamus of Miletus was also constructed across all the area within the city wall and later became famous as the "Hippodamian plan", serving as the basic layout for the new foundations of Hellenistic and Roman cities.

=== Second Achaemenid period ===
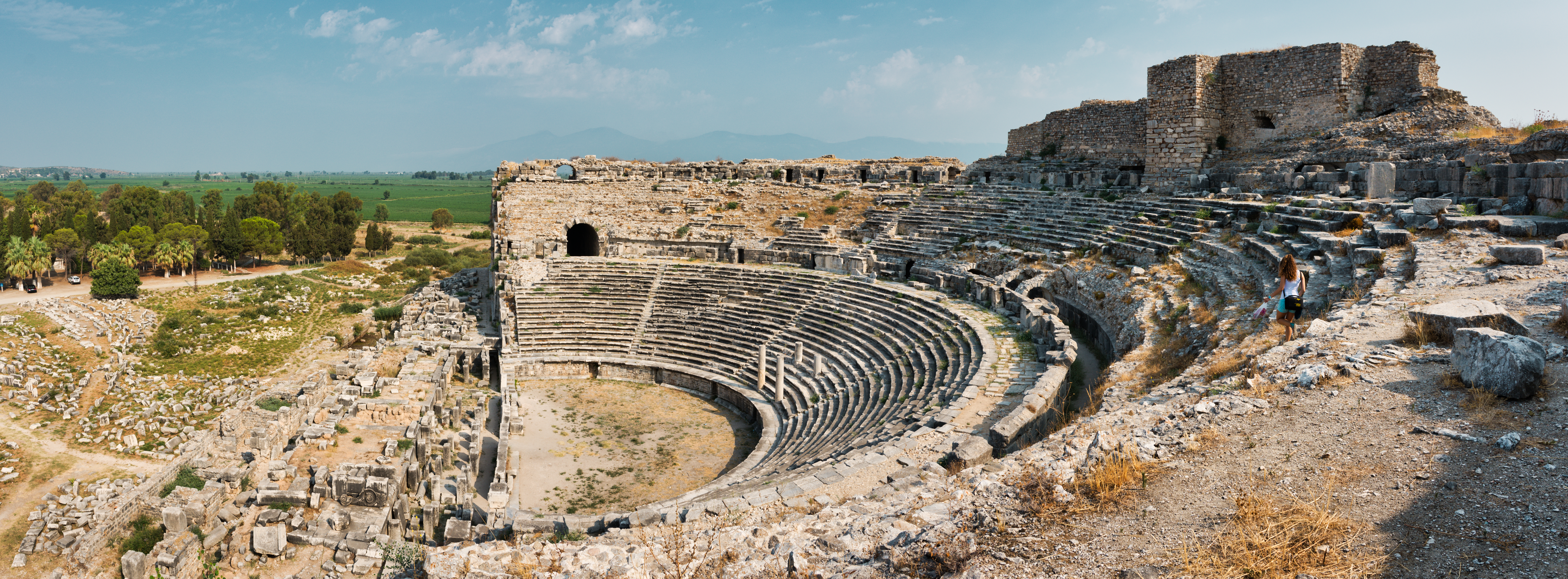
Theatre of Miletus

In 387 BC, the Peace of Antalcidas gave the Persian Achaemenid Empire under king Artaxerxes II control of the Greek city-states of Ionia, including Miletus.

In 358 BC, Artaxerxes II died and was succeeded by his son Artaxerxes III, who, in 355 BC, forced Athens to conclude a peace, which required its forces to leave Asia Minor (Anatolia) and acknowledge the independence of its rebellious allies.

Its maritime hegemony was never regained after the occupation.

=== Macedonian period ===
In 334 BC, the Siege of Miletus by the forces of Alexander the Great of Macedonia conquered the city and most of the rest of Asia Minor soon followed. In this period, the city reached its greatest extent, occupying within its walls an area of approximately 90 hectares (220 acres).

When Alexander died in 323 BC, Miletus came under the control of Ptolemy, governor of Caria, and his satrap of Lydia, Asander, who had become autonomous. In 312 BC, Macedonian general Antigonus I Monophthalmus sent Docimus and Medeius to free the city and grant autonomy, restoring the democratic patrimonial regime. In 301 BC, after Antigonus I was killed in the Battle of Ipsus by the coalition of Lysimachus, Cassander, and Seleucus I Nicator, founder of the Seleucid Empire, Miletus maintained good relations with all the successors after Seleucus I Nicator made substantial donations to the sanctuary of Didyma and returned the statue of Apollo that had been stolen by the Persians in 494 BC.

In 295 BC, Antigonus I's son Demetrius Poliorcetes was the eponymous archon (stephanephorus) in the city, which allied with Ptolemy I Soter of Egypt, while Lysimachus assumed power in the region, enforcing a strict policy towards the Greek cities by imposing high taxes, forcing Miletus to resort to lending.

=== Seleucid period ===
Around 287/286 BC Demetrius Poliorcetes returned, but failed to maintain his possessions and was imprisoned in Syria. Nicocles of Sidon, the commander of Demetrius' fleet surrendered the city. Lysimachus dominated until 281 BC, when he was defeated by the Seleucids at the Battle of Corupedium. In 280/279 BC the Milesians adopted a new chronological system based on the Seleucids.

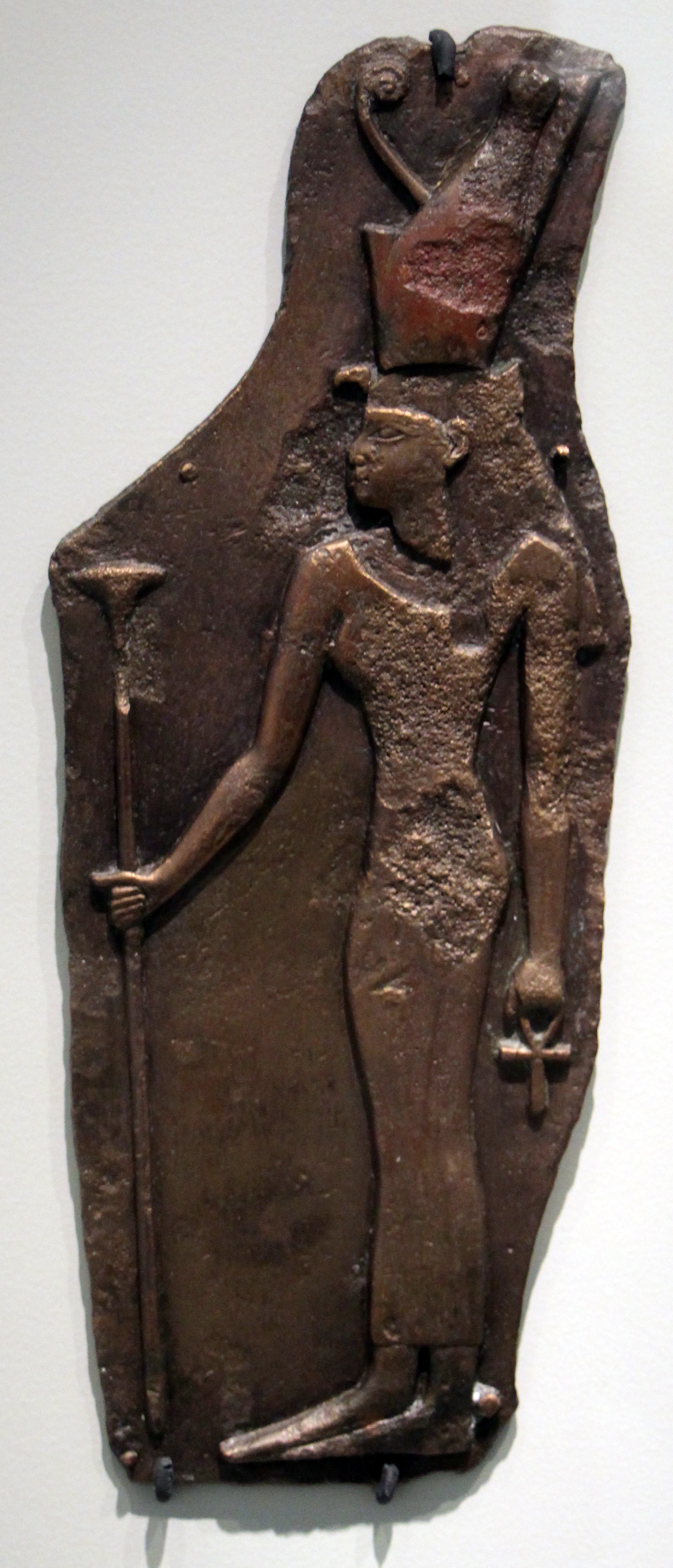
Egyptian artefact found in Miletus

=== Egyptian period ===
In 279 BC, the city was taken from Seleucid king Antiochus I by Egyptian king Ptolemy II Philadelphus, who donated a large area of land to cement their friendship, and it remained under Egyptian sway until the end of the century.

Aristides of Miletus, founder of the bawdy Miletian school of literature, flourished in the 2nd century BC.

=== Roman period ===
After an alliance with Rome, in 133 BC the city became part of the province of Asia.

Miletus benefited from Roman rule and most of the present monuments date to this period.

The New Testament mentions Miletus as the site where the Apostle Paul in 57 AD met the elders of the church of Ephesus near the close of his Third Missionary Journey, as recorded in Acts of the Apostles (Acts 20:15–38). It is believed that Paul stopped by the Great Harbour Monument and sat on its steps. He might have met the Ephesian elders there and then bade them farewell on the nearby beach. Miletus is also the city where Paul left Trophimus, one of his travelling companions, to recover from an illness (2 Timothy 4:20). Because this cannot be the same visit as Acts 20 (in which Trophimus accompanied Paul all the way to Jerusalem, according to Acts 21:29), Paul must have made at least one additional visit to Miletus, perhaps as late as 65 or 66 AD. Paul's previous successful three-year ministry in nearby Ephesus resulted in the evangelization of the entire province of Asia (see Acts 19:10, 20; 1 Corinthians 16:9). It is safe to assume that at least by the time of the apostle's second visit to Miletus, a fledgling Christian community was established in Miletus.

In 262 new city walls were built.

However the harbour was silting up and the economy was in decline. In 538 emperor Justinian rebuilt the walls but it had become a small town.

=== Byzantine period ===
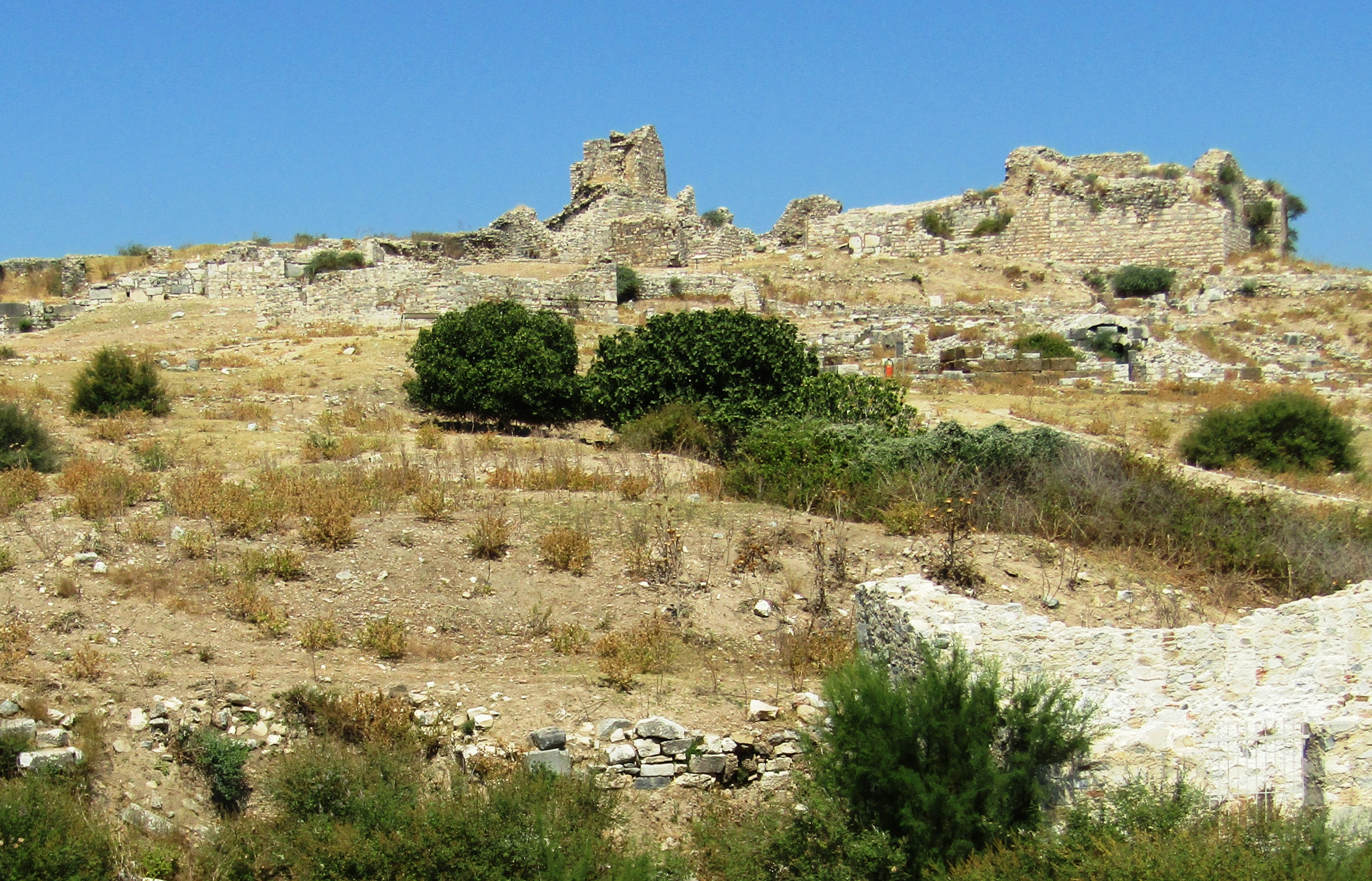
Byzantine Palation Castle

During the Byzantine age the see of Miletus was raised to an archbishopric and later a metropolitan bishopric. The small Byzantine castle called Palation located on the hill beside the city, was built at this time. Miletus was headed by a curator. In 1369, the archbishopric of Miletus, along with the one of Antioch on the Meander, were assumed by Stauropolis due to their decline, as a result of the threat posed by the Anatolian Beyliks. Miletus was conquered by the Turks in the late 13th century, but was briefly reconquered by the Byzantines in 1294/5 during the Meander campaigns of Alexios Philanthropenos.

=== Turkish rule ===
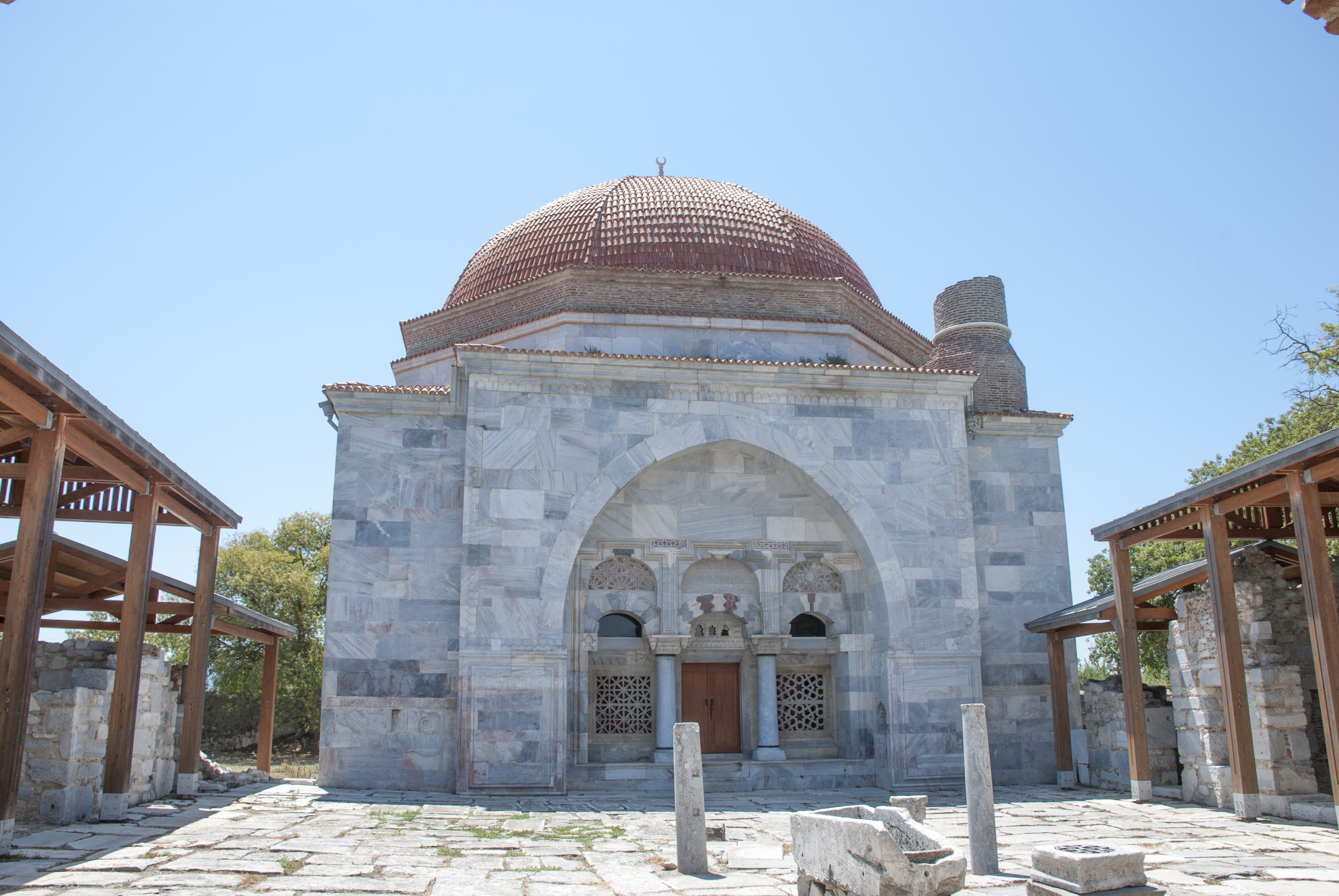
The Ottoman Ilyas Bey mosque from the Turkish period at the Miletus site

Turks conquered the city in the 14th century and used Miletus as a port to trade with Venice.

In the 15th century, the Ottomans utilized the city as a harbour during their rule in Anatolia. As the harbour became silted up, the city was abandoned. Due to ancient and subsequent deforestation, overgrazing (mostly by goat herds), erosion and soil degradation, the ruins of the city lie some 10 km (6.2 mi) from the sea with sediments filling the plain and bare hill ridges without soils and trees, a maquis shrubland remaining.

The Ilyas Bey Complex from 1403 with its mosque is a Europa Nostra awarded cultural heritage site in Miletus.

=== Archaeological excavations ===
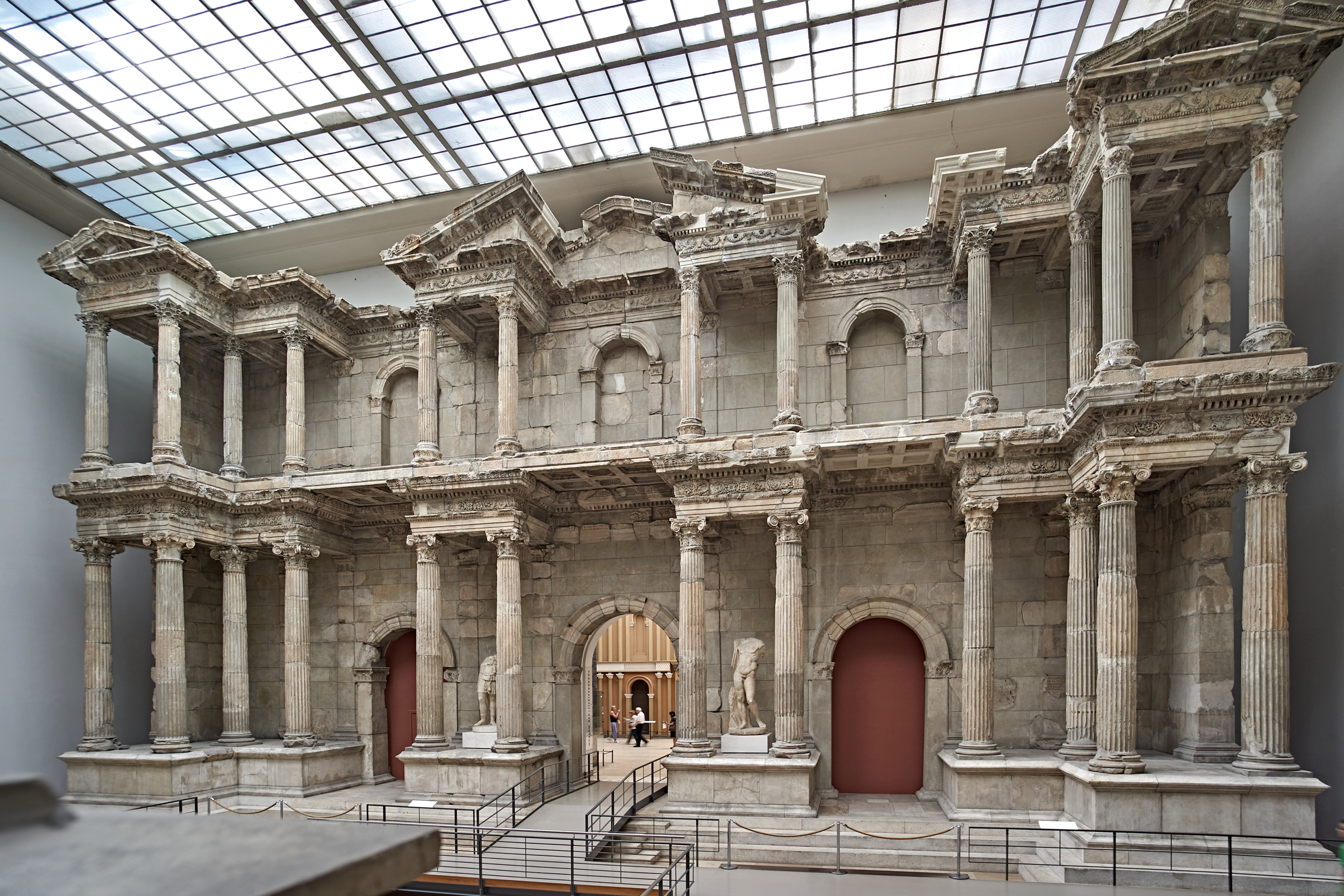
The Market Gate of Miletus at the Pergamon Museum in Berlin

The first excavations in Miletus were conducted by the French archaeologist Olivier Rayet in 1873, followed by the German archaeologists Julius Hülsen and Theodor Wiegand between 1899 and 1931. Excavations, however, were interrupted several times by wars and various other events. Carl Weickart excavated for a short season in 1938 and again between 1955 and 1957. He was followed by Gerhard Kleiner and then by Wolfgang Muller-Wiener. Today, excavations are organized by the Ruhr University of Bochum, Germany.

One remarkable artifact recovered from the city during the first excavations of the 19th century, the Market Gate of Miletus, was transported piece by piece to Germany and reassembled. It is currently exhibited at the Pergamon Museum in Berlin. The main collection of artifacts resides in the Miletus Museum in Didim, Aydın, serving since 1973.

Archaeologists discovered a cave under the city's theatre and believe that it is a "sacred" cave which belonged to the cult of Asklepius.

=== Examples of the Milesian Vase ===
Artifacts

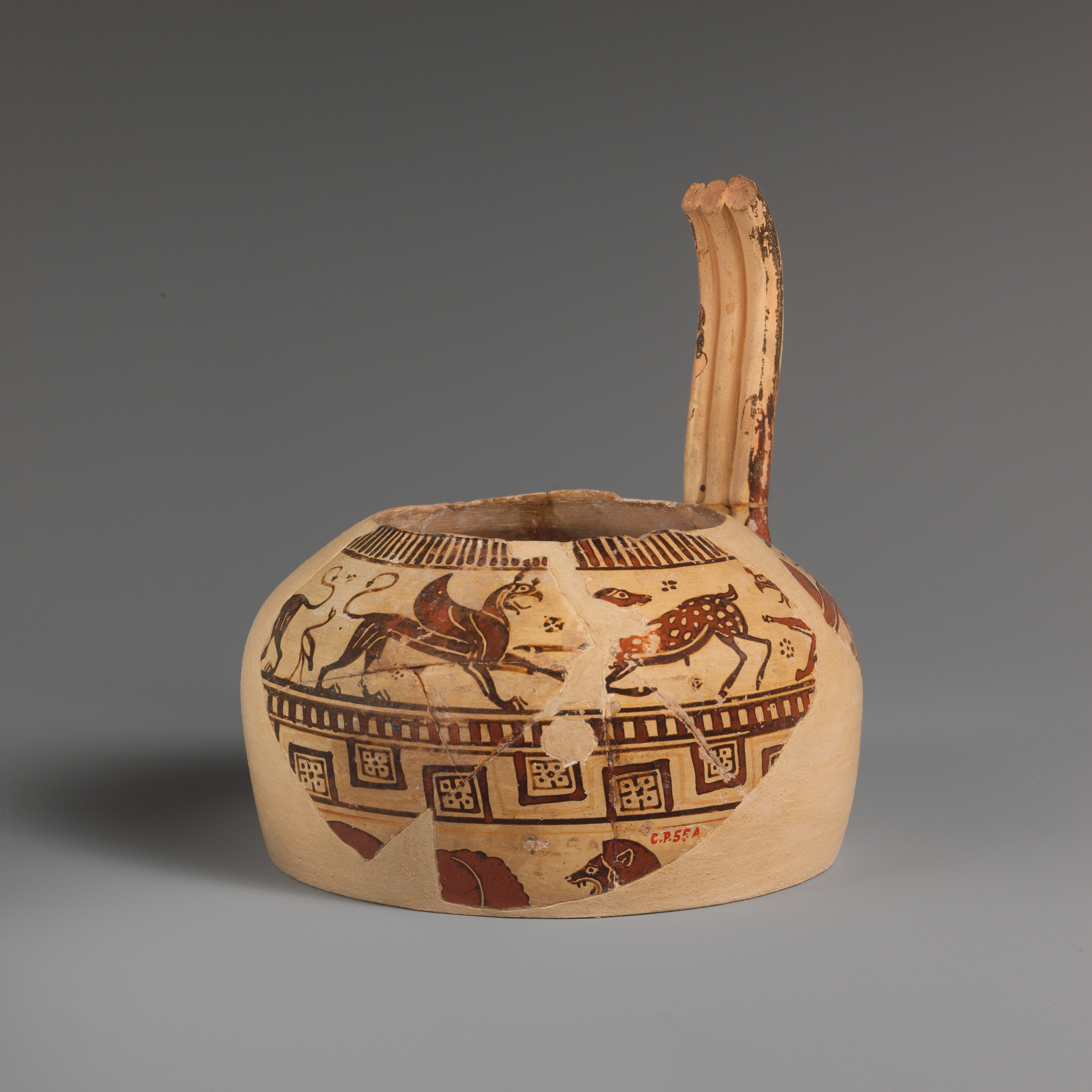
The name Fikellura derives from a site on the island of Rhodes to which this fabric has been attributed. It is now established that the center of production was Miletus.

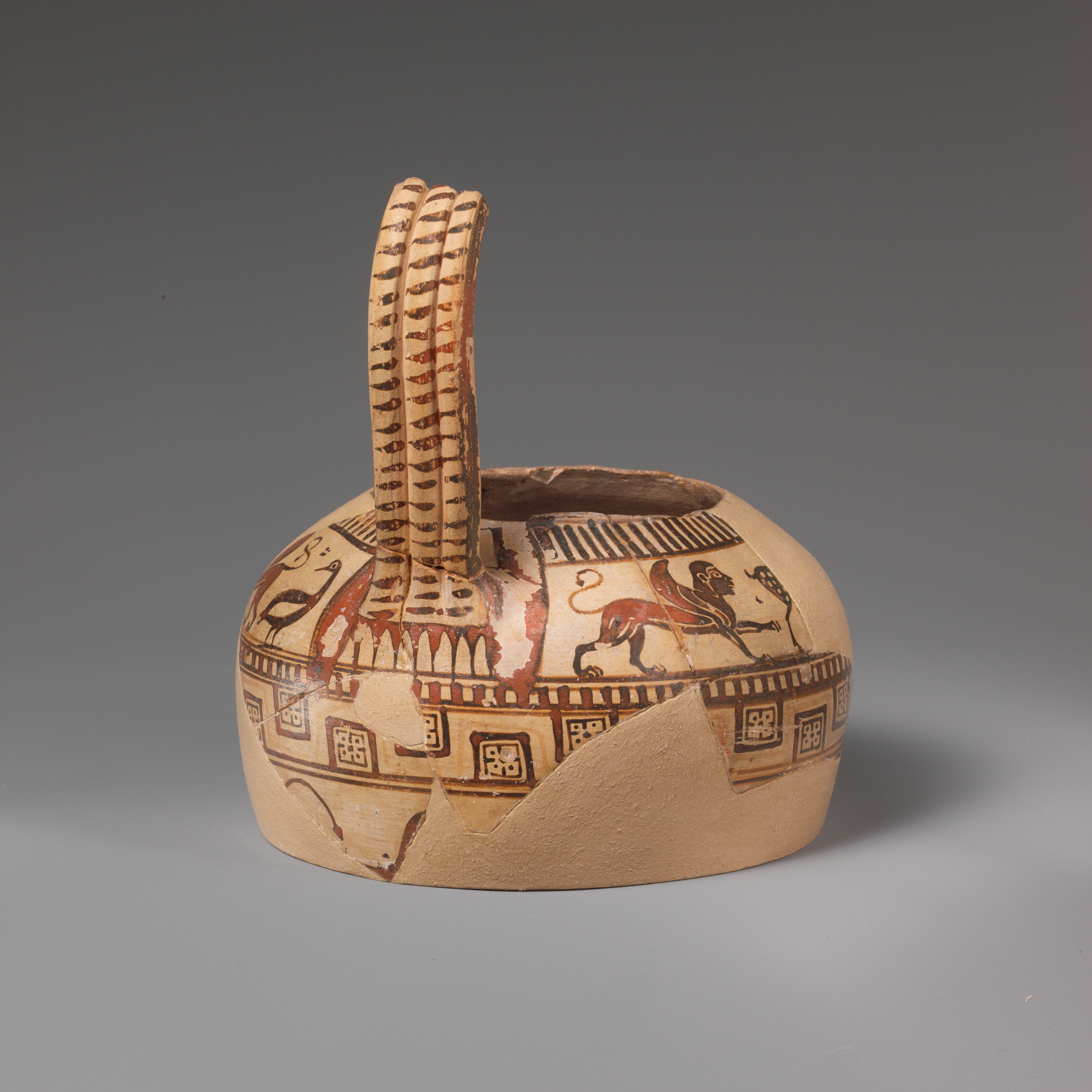

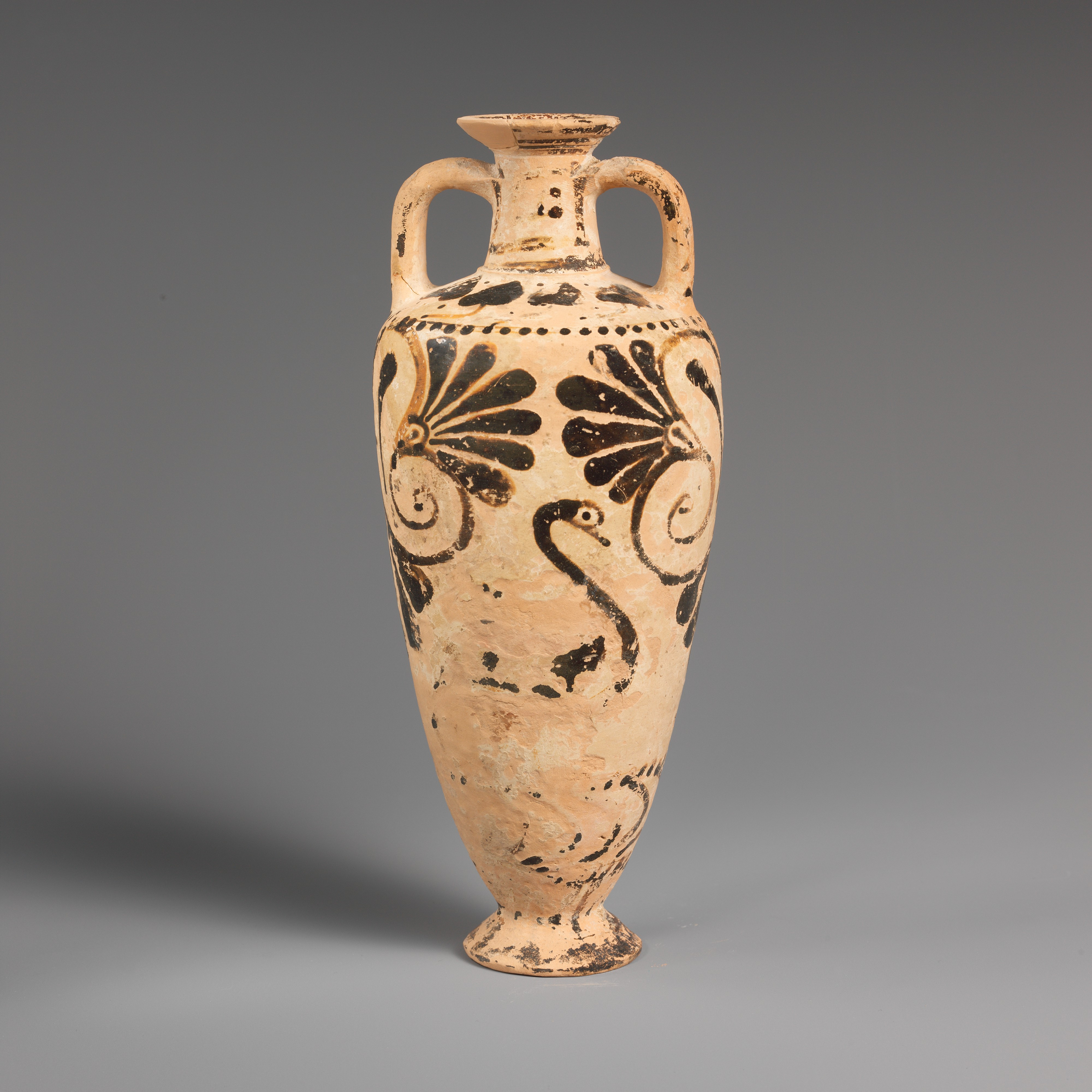
Milesian Vase

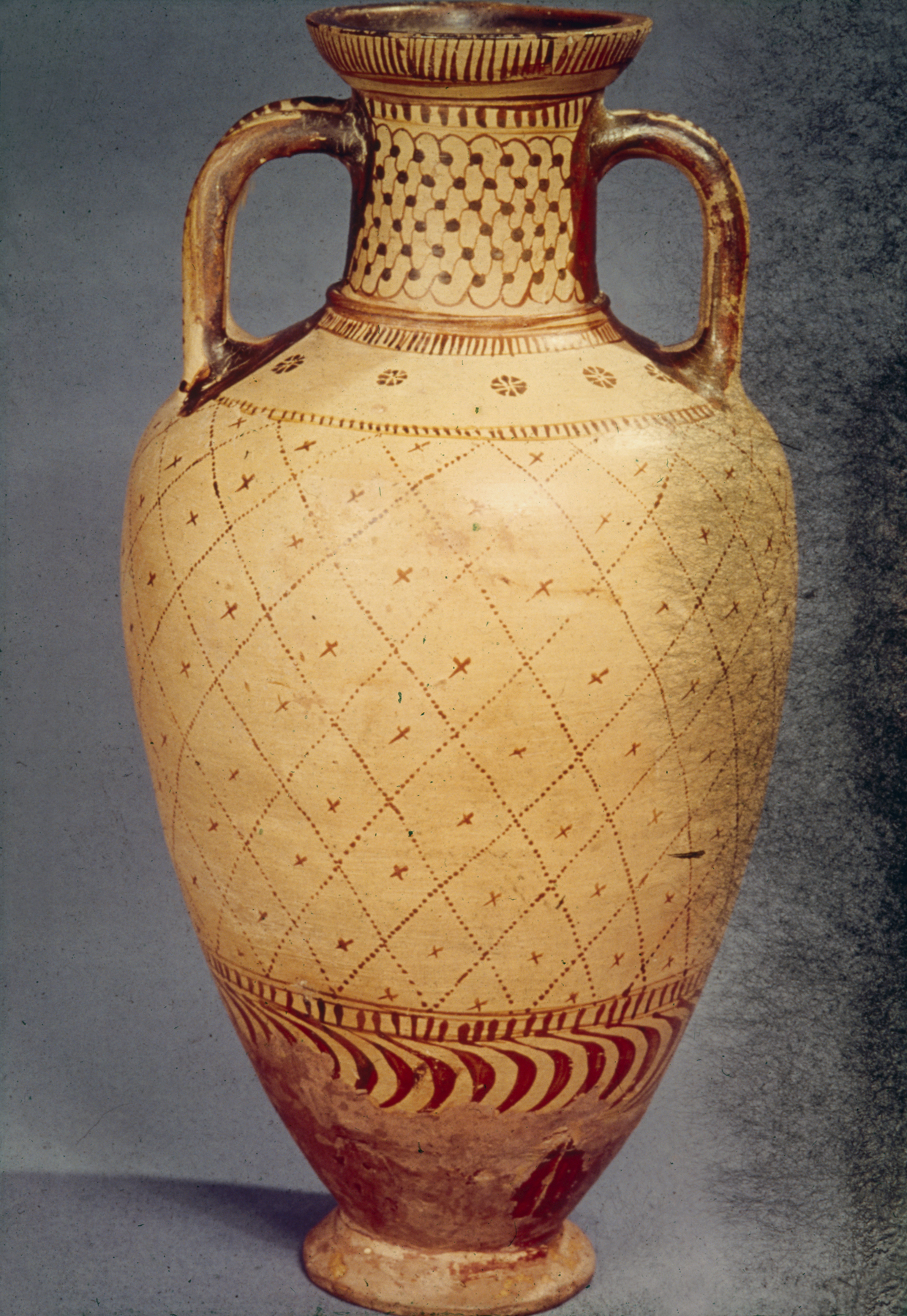
Milesian Vase

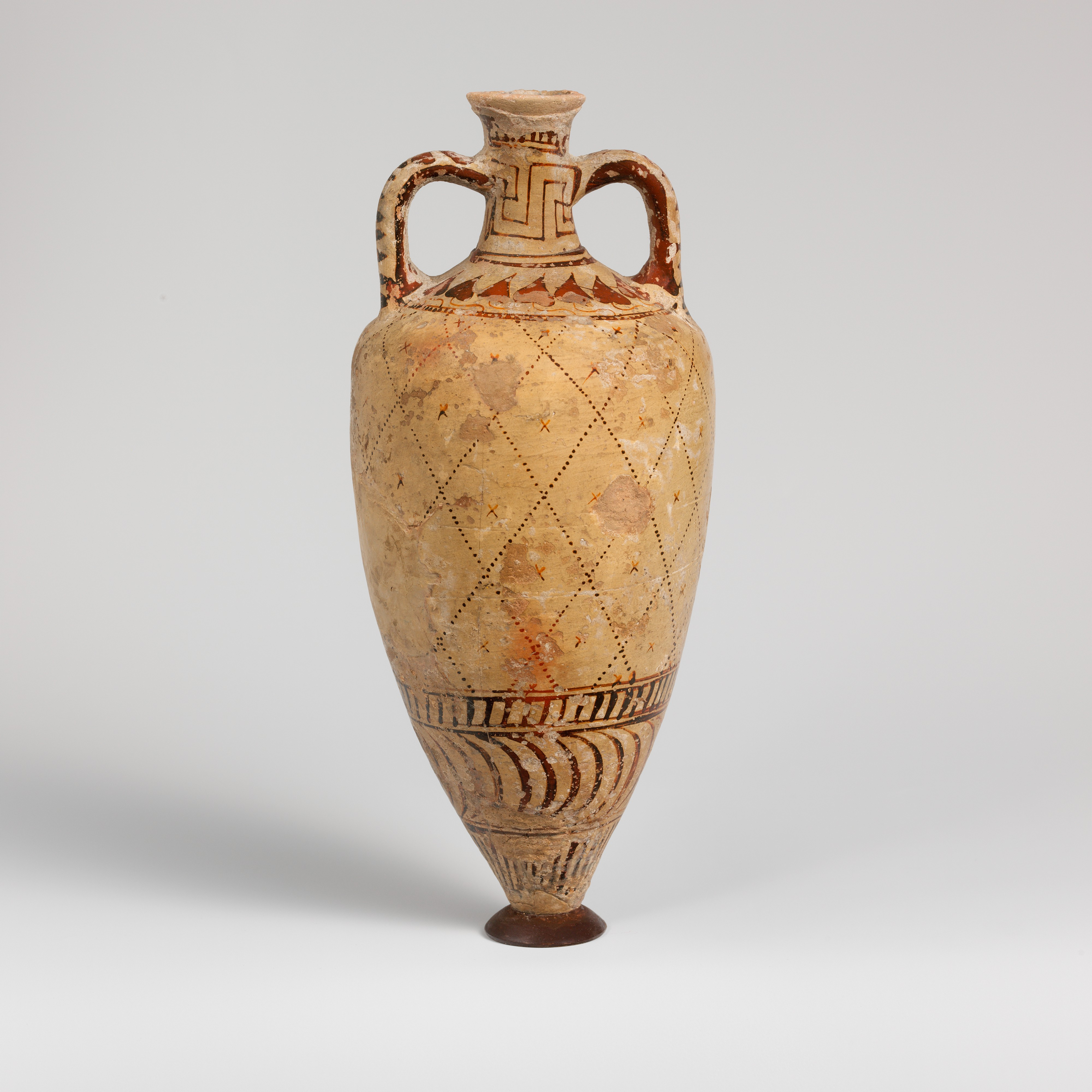
Milesian Vase

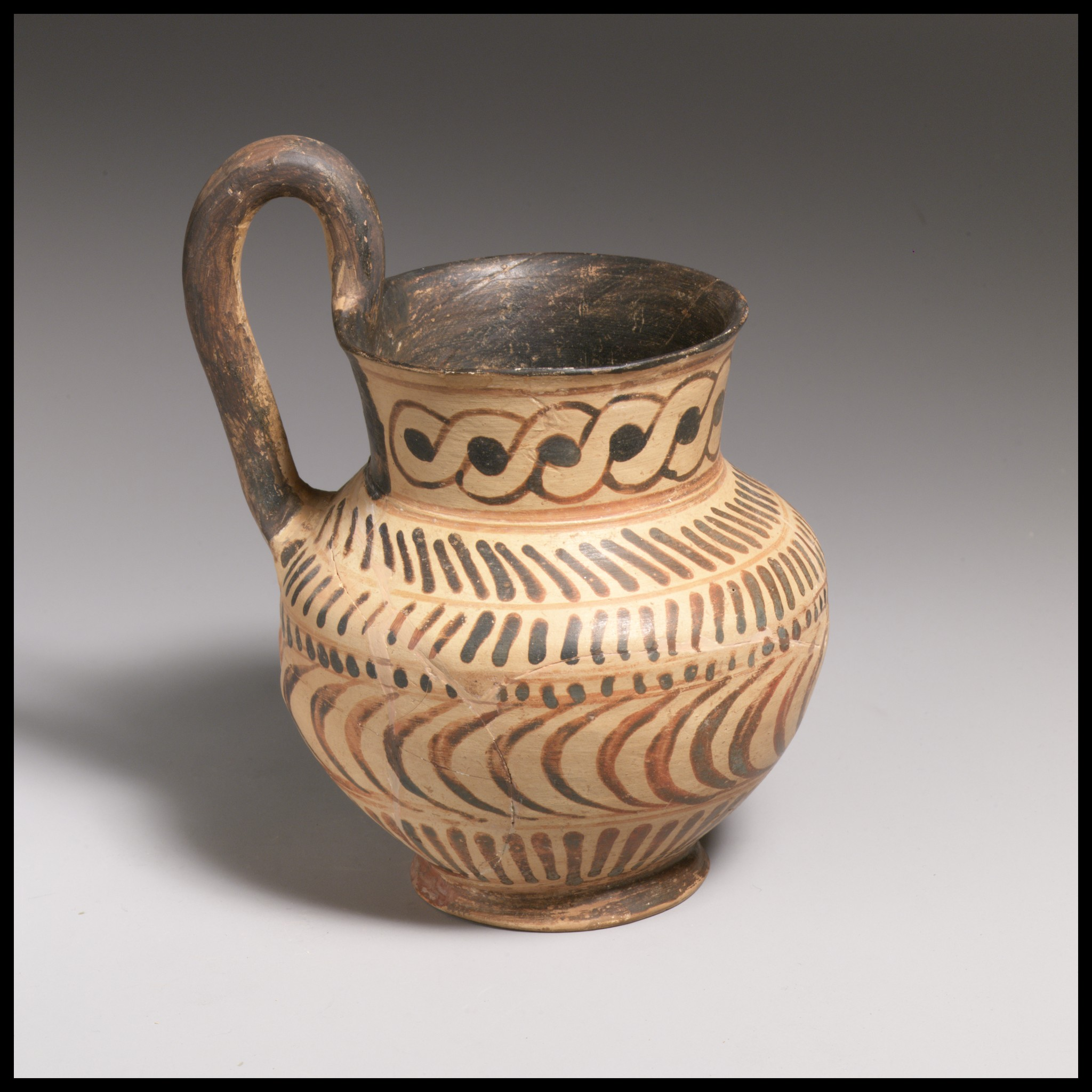
Milesian Vase

== Geography ==
Location of Miletus at the Maeander River's mouth

The ruins appear on satellite maps at 37°31.8'N 27°16.7'E, about 3 km north of Balat and 3 km east of Batıköy in Aydın Province, Turkey.

In antiquity the city possessed a harbor at the southern entry of a large bay, on which two more of the traditional twelve Ionian cities stood: Priene and Myus. The harbor of Miletus was additionally protected by the nearby small island of Lade. Over the centuries the gulf silted up with alluvium carried by the Meander River. Priene and Myus had lost their harbors by the Roman era, and Miletus itself became an inland town in the early Christian era; all three were abandoned to ruin as their economies were strangled by the lack of access to the sea. There is a Great Harbor Monument where, according to the New Testament account, the apostle Paul stopped on his way back to Jerusalem by boat. He met the Ephesian Elders and then headed out to the beach to bid them farewell, recorded in the book of Acts 20:17-38.

=== Geology ===
During the Pleistocene epoch the Miletus region was submerged in the Aegean Sea. It subsequently emerged slowly, the sea reaching a low level of about 130 meters (430 ft) below present level at about 18,000 BP. The site of Miletus was part of the mainland.

A gradual rise brought a level of about 1.75 meters (5 ft 9 in) below present at about 5500 BP, creating several karst block islands of limestone, the location of the first settlements at Miletus. At about 1500 BC the karst shifted due to small crustal movements and the islands consolidated into a peninsula. Since then the sea has risen 1.75 m but the peninsula has been surrounded by sediment from the Maeander river and is now land-locked. Sedimentation of the harbor began at about 1000 BC, and by 300 AD Lake Bafa had been created.

== Gallery ==
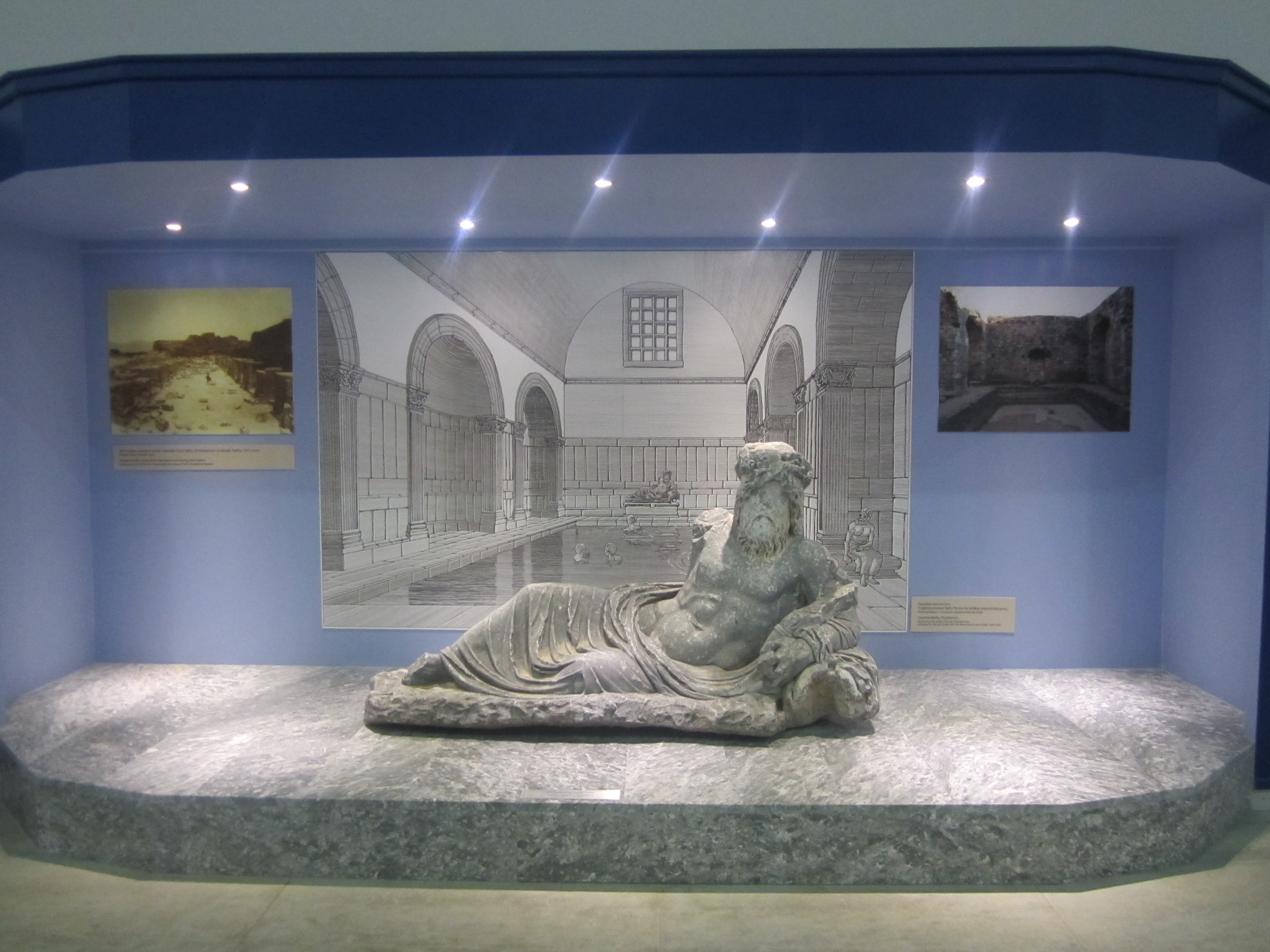
Sculpture from Baths of Faustina

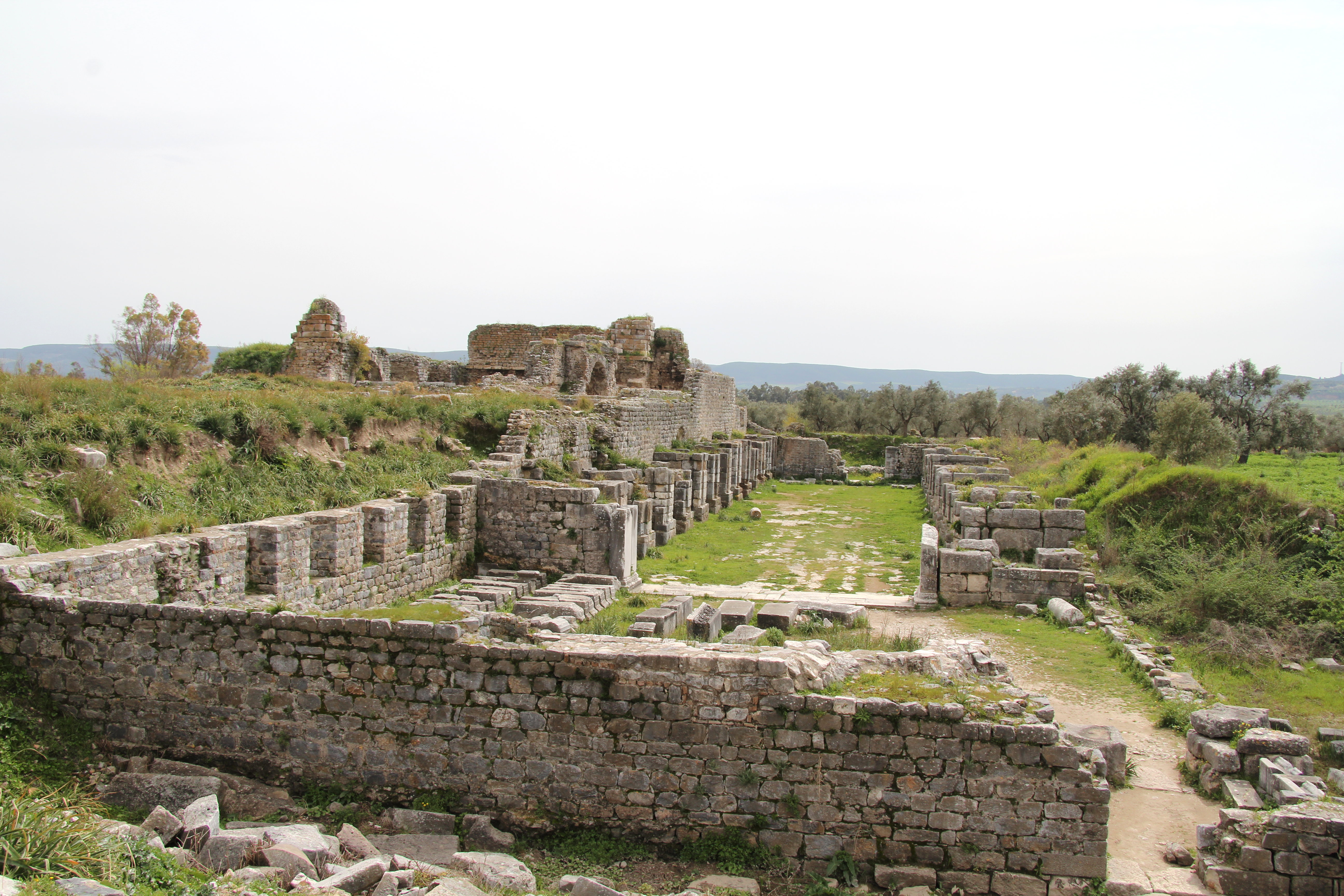
Faustina Baths in Miletus

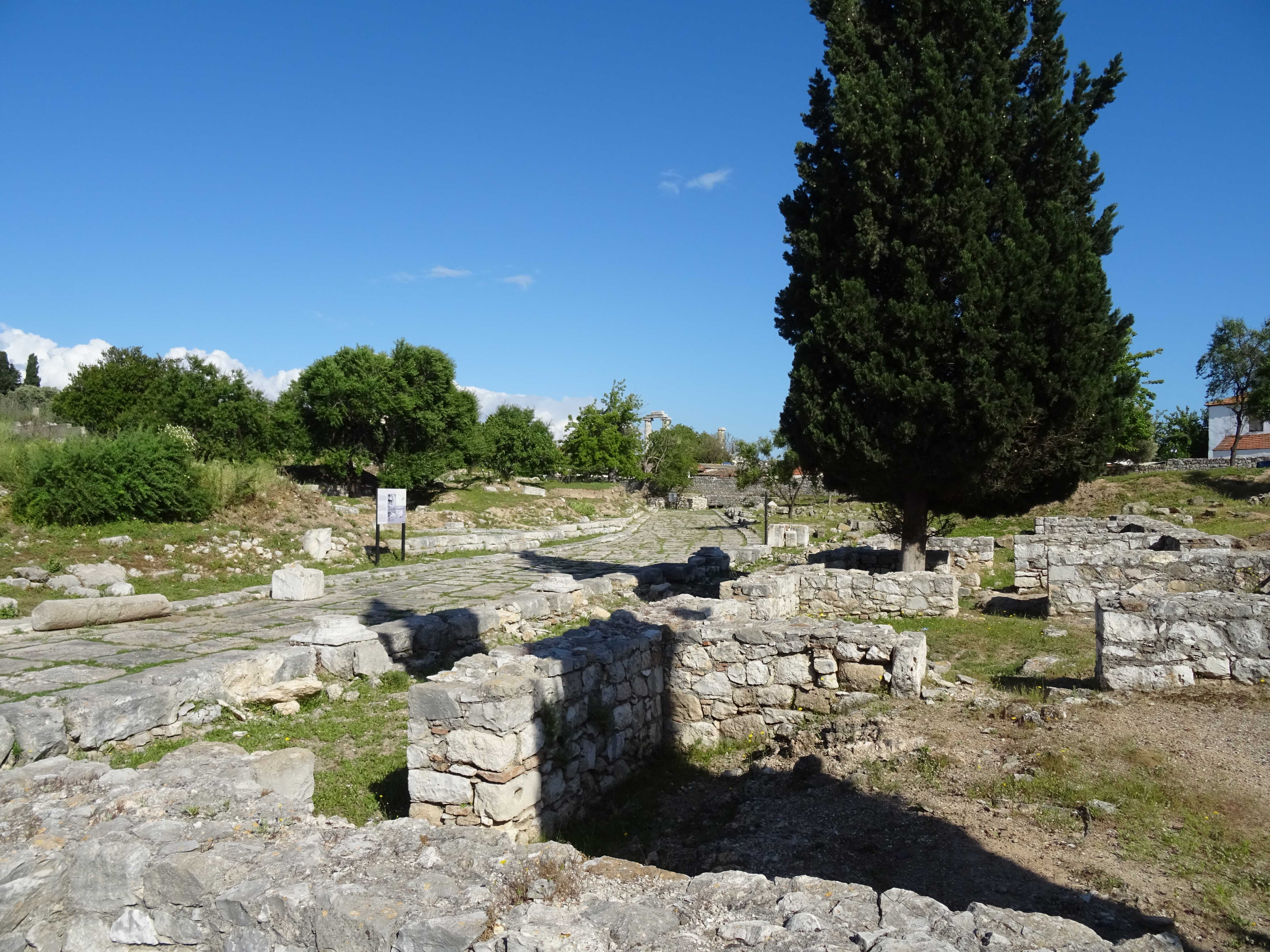
The Sacred Way from Miletus with the remains of the stoa

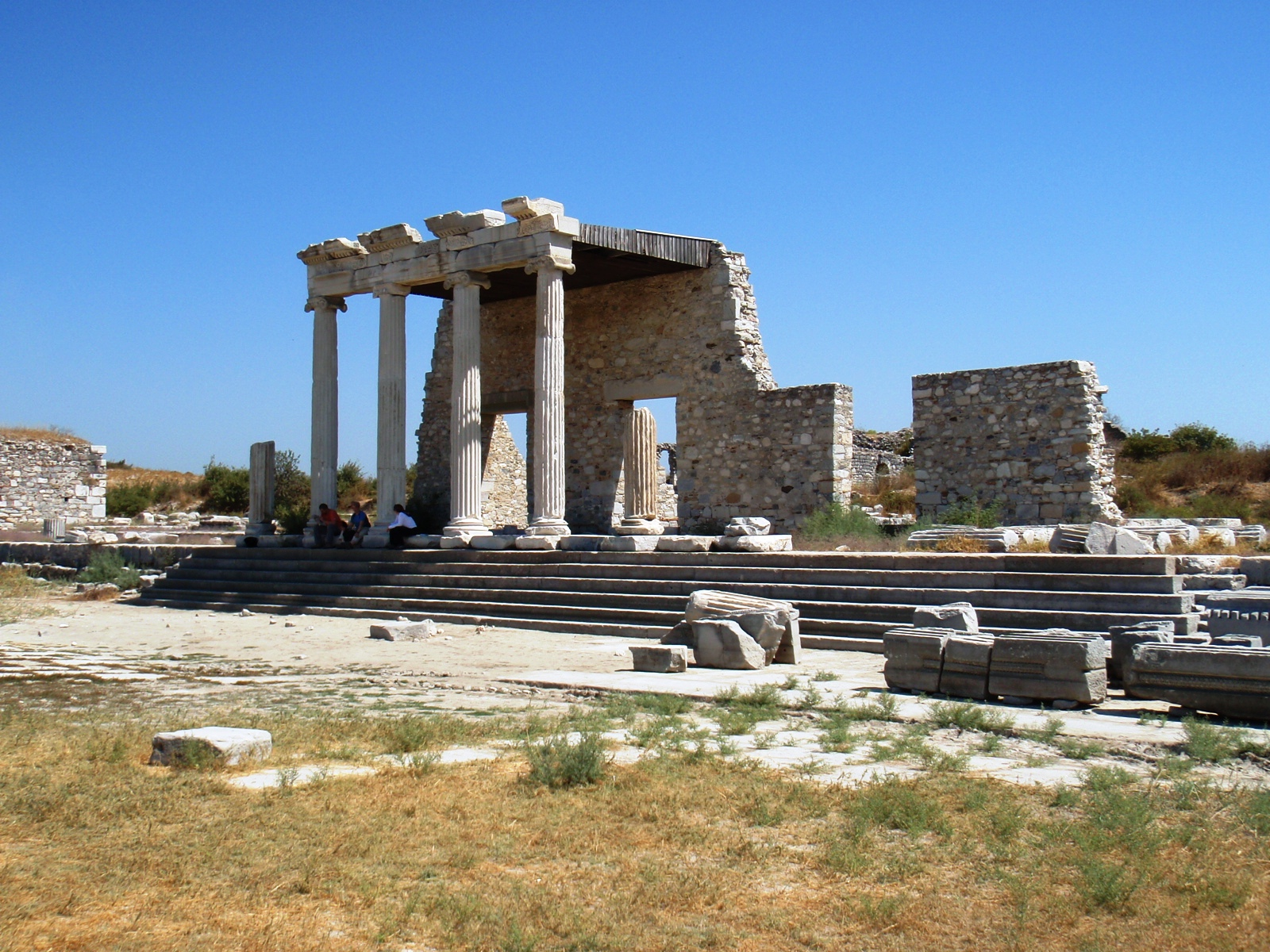
The Ionic Stoa on the Sacred Way

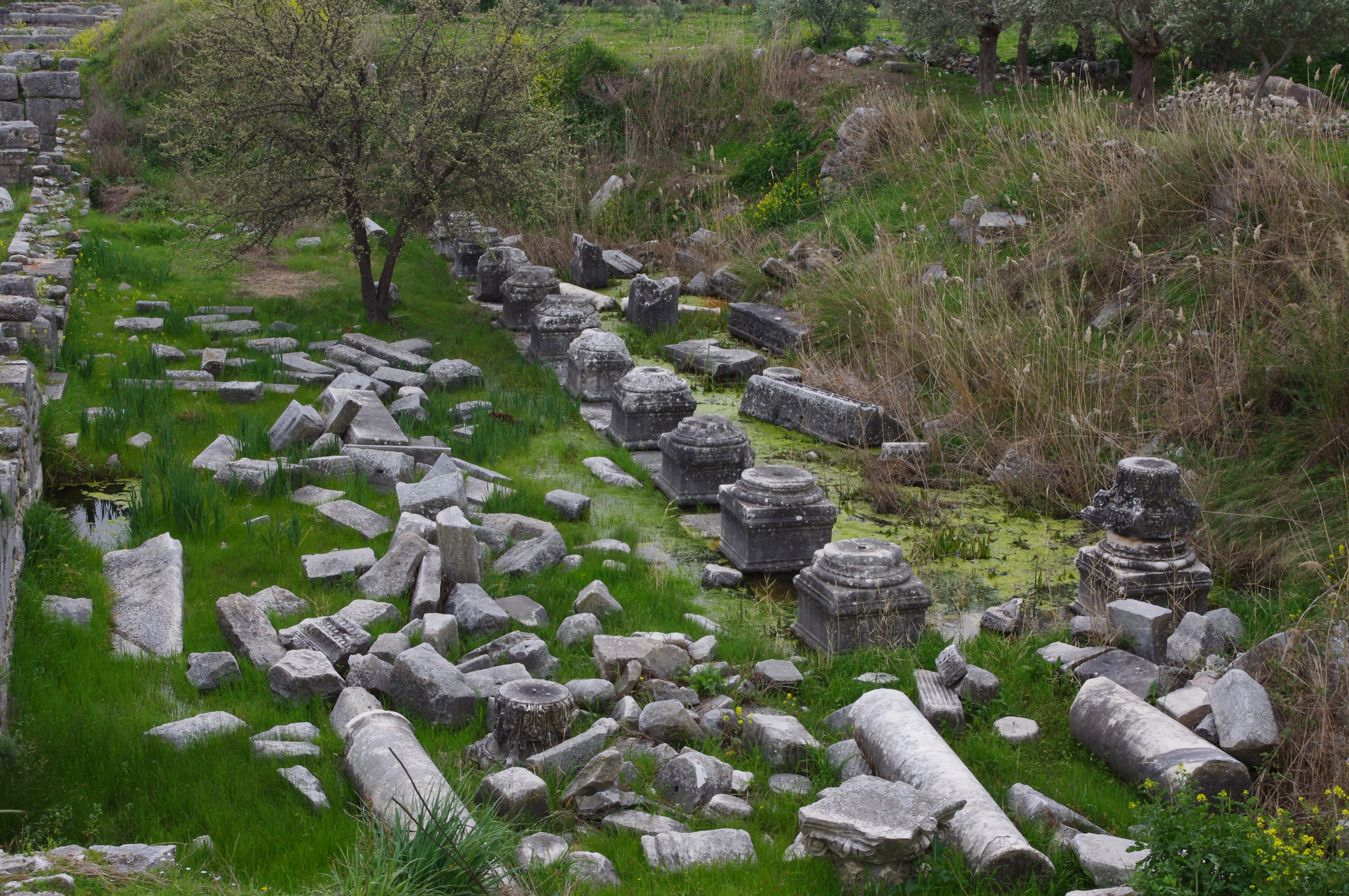
Remains of the stoa connecting the main Bath of Faustina to the Palaestra

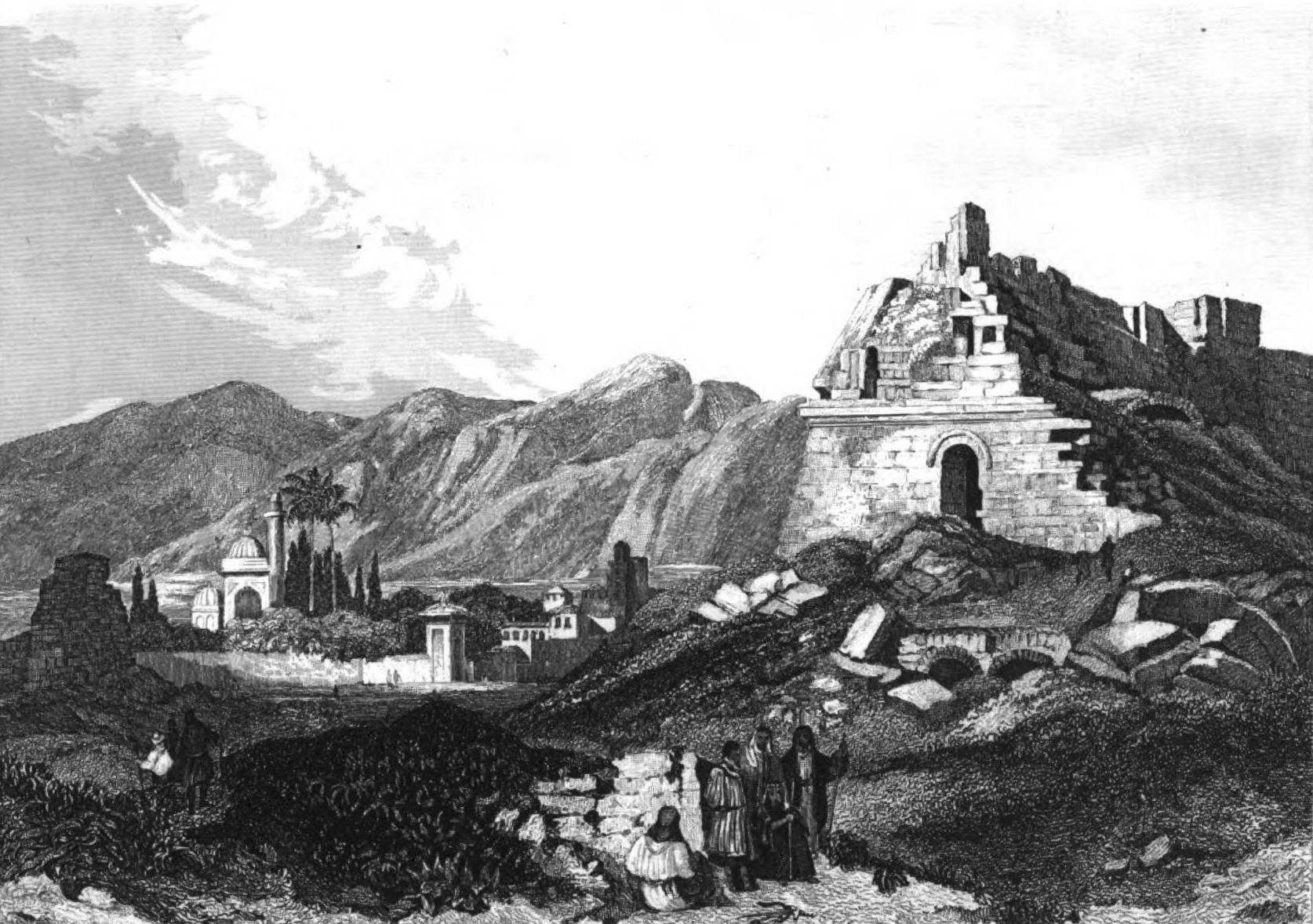
Illustration of Miletus

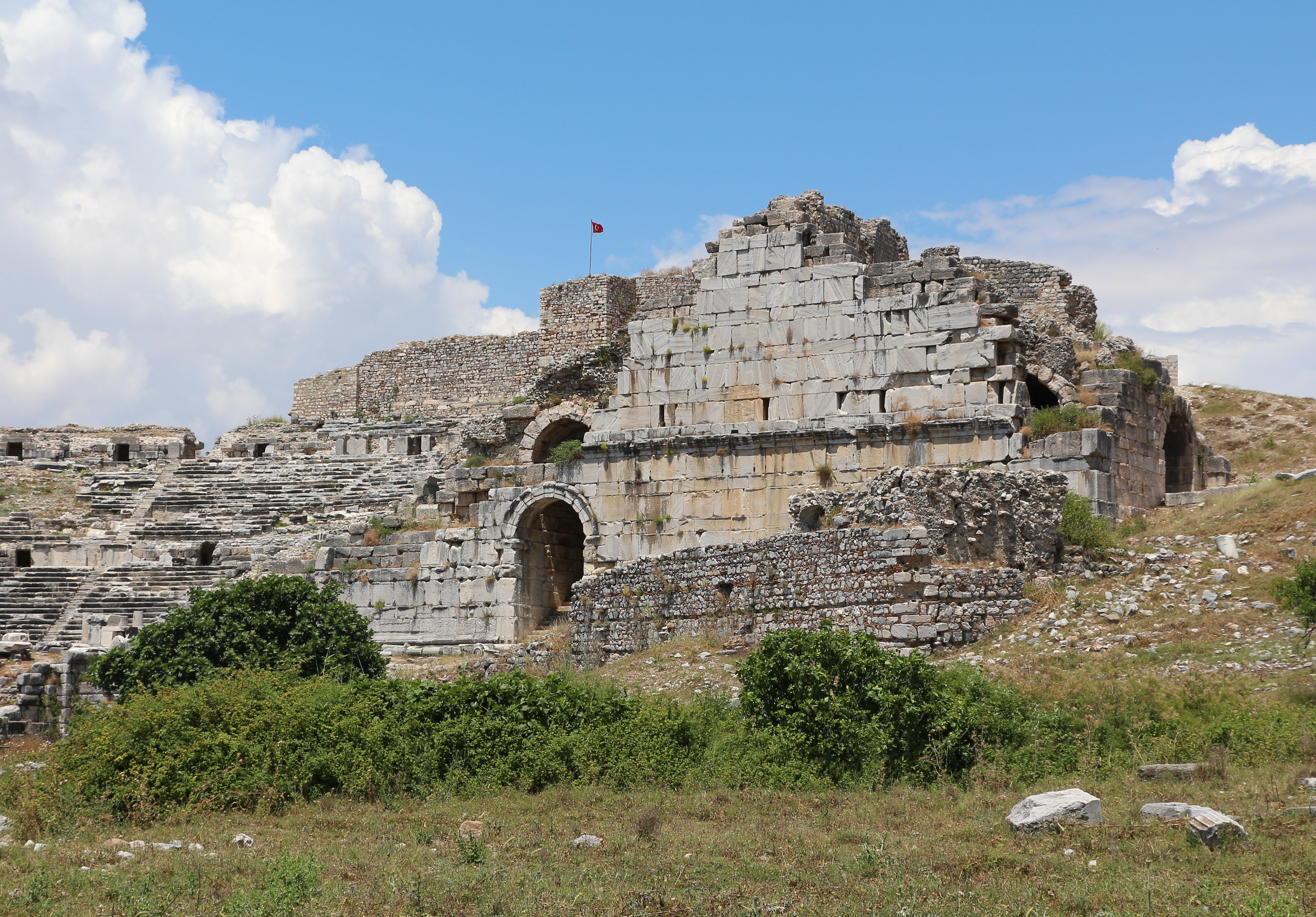
Right entrance of the ancient Greek theatre

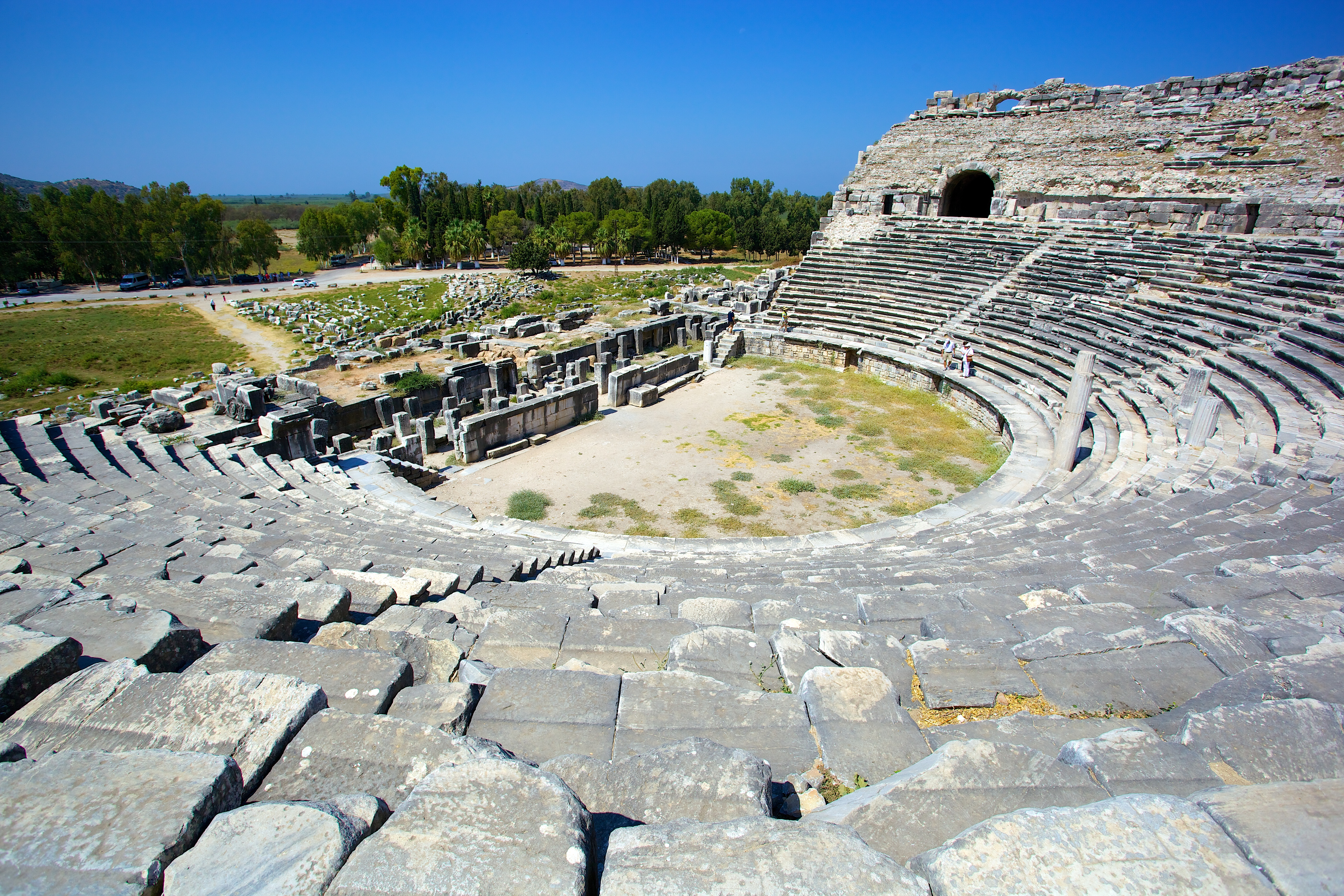
Ancient Greek theatre

== Economy and Land Use ==
The economic prosperity of Miletus during the Archaic and Classical periods depended heavily on its rural hinterland. Archaeological surveys and remote sensing analyses have revealed systems of terraces, field boundaries, and enclosures across the Milesian peninsula. These are interpreted as evidence of long-standing agro-pastoral activity, possibly dating as far back as the Archaic period and extending into Late Antiquity.

Herodotus, describing the tactics of Alyattes against the Milesian countryside, writes: "He sent his army, marching to the sound of pipes and harps and bass and treble flutes, to invade when the crops in the land were ripe; and whenever he came to the Milesian territory, he neither demolished nor burnt nor tore the doors off the country dwellings, but let them stand unharmed; but he destroyed the trees and the crops of the land, and so returned to where he came from; for as the Milesians had command of the sea, it was of no use for his army to besiege their city. The reason that the Lydian did not destroy the houses was this: that the Milesians might have homes from which to plant and cultivate their land, and that there might be the fruit of their toil for his invading army to lay waste."

These rural systems supported olive cultivation, animal herding, and small-scale farming. Faunal remains suggest that herding was a major component of the rural economy. Excavations have shown a predominance of goat bones over sheep, possibly reflecting the influence of Cretan animal husbandry techniques adopted in early Miletus.

Strabo, citing Ephorus, relates: "Miletus was first founded and fortified by the Cretans on the spot above the sea-coast where at present the ancient Miletus is situated, and that Sarpedon conducted thither settlers from the Miletus in Crete, and gave it the same name; that Leleges were the former occupiers of the country, and that afterwards Neleus built the present city."

Farmsteads, oil presses, cisterns, and possible pastoral installations such as shepherding stations have been identified in the countryside, suggesting a decentralized but productive economy. The northern plains and Maeander valley, both under Milesian control, were especially fertile, providing grain and supporting livestock crucial to the city's sustenance and export economy.

In addition to grain and wool, Miletus likely exported surplus olive oil during favorable years. Archaic Milesian amphorae, widely distributed and characterized by thickened rims, may have been used for oil transport.

Botanical evidence from the Milesian countryside also reveals the cultivation of figs and lentils. Carbonized fig remains have been found in large numbers, and fig trees were likely common along field margins, significantly influencing the diet in the region.

Both literary and archaeological evidence demonstrate that Miletus' agricultural base was essential for sustaining its urban population, supporting rural life, and providing the surpluses that underpinned Milesian colonization and trade.

== Colonies ==
Map of the Black Sea, featuring the chronological phasing of major Milesian colonial foundations

Miletus became known for the great number of colonies it founded. It was considered the greatest Greek metropolis and founded more colonies than any other Greek city. Pliny the Elder (Natural History, 5.31) says that Miletus founded over 90 colonies.

The extent of Milesian colonization was shaped by a convergence of economic, social, and political factors. Like other Greek poleis, Miletus faced pressures from population growth and competition for arable land, which drove many citizens to seek new opportunities overseas. Economic motivations included expanding trade networks and accessing new resources, especially along the Black Sea coast, which offered grain, fish, and raw materials not easily available in Ionia. Political factors, such as stasis (internal conflict) and the impact of foreign powers like Lydia and Persia, also contributed, sometimes prompting groups or exiles to establish new settlements abroad. Scholars note that Milesian colonization was characterized both by "proactive" ventures seeking commercial gain and "reactive" migrations resulting from disruptions at home.

The Black Sea region became a primary focus of Milesian colonial expansion from the seventh century BCE onward. Milesian foundations such as Sinope, Olbia, and Panticapaeum quickly grew into major trading hubs and centres for the exchange of goods between Greeks and indigenous populations. These colonies enabled Miletus to dominate regional commerce in grain, fish, and slaves, contributing significantly to the city's wealth. The choice of the Black Sea also reflected both strategies to exploit new resources and responses to population and political pressures in Ionia.

Sinope, located on the southern coast of the Black Sea, was one of the earliest and most prosperous Milesian colonies, traditionally founded in the late seventh century BCE.

Olbia, on the northwestern Black Sea coast, likewise became a major economic centre, especially for grain exports to the Greek world.

Milesian colonization not only expanded the city's economic and political reach but also established enduring cultural connections across the Mediterranean and Black Sea, with many settlements continuing to thrive and influence local societies for centuries.

While some Milesian colonies ultimately declined or were absorbed by neighbouring powers, many—such as Sinope and Olbia—remained prominent centres of trade and Hellenic culture well into the Hellenistic and Roman periods. The archaeological remains and historical records of these colonies continue to shed light on the reach and legacy of Milesian influence throughout antiquity.

Some colonies founded include:

- Abydos
- Amisos
- Apollonia Pontica
- Borysthenites (Berezan)
- Cardia
- Cius
- Colonae
- Cotyora
- Cyzicus
- Dioscurias
- Hermonassa
- Histria
- Kepoi
- Kerasous
- Lampsacus
- Leros
- Limnae
- Miletopolis
- Myrmekion (?)
- Nymphaion
- Odessos
- Olbia
- Paesus
- Panticapaeum
- Parium
- Patraeus
- Phanagoria
- Phasis
- Pityus
- Priapus
- Proconnesus
- Prusias (?)
- Sinope
- Scepsis
- Tanais
- Theodosia
- Tieion
- Tomis
- Tyras
- Tyritake
- Trapezunt

== Philosophy ==
Miletus played a foundational role in the origins of Western philosophical inquiry. In the 6th century BCE, thinkers such as Thales, Anaximander, and Anaximenes—collectively known as the Milesian school—began to investigate the material basis of the cosmos through rational, systematic inquiry rather than mythological narrative.

Aristotle records that, "Thales, the founder of this kind of philosophy, stated it to be water. (This is why he declared that the earth rests on water.) ...water is the principle of the nature of moist things." Aristotle further notes, "Some say [the earth] rests on water. This is the oldest account that we have inherited, and they say that Thales of Miletus said this. It rests because it floats like wood or some other such thing...for nothing is by nature such as to rest on air, but on water."

Thales' student Anaximander introduced the concept of the apeiron (the infinite or indefinite) as a more abstract source of existence. According to Aristotle (via Simplicius): "Anaximander... said that the apeiron was the arkhē and element of things that are, and he was the first to introduce this name for the arkhē. ...He says that the arkhē is neither water nor any of the other things called elements, but some other nature which is apeiron, out of which come to be all the heavens and the worlds in them. The things that are perish into the things from which they come to be, according to necessity, for they pay penalty and retribution to each other for their injustice in accordance with the ordering of time, as he says in rather poetical language." Aristotle also states that for Anaximander, the apeiron "is deathless and indestructible...for it is divine."

Anaximenes, in turn, posited air (aēr) as the basic element, suggesting it could transform into other forms of matter through rarefaction and condensation: "Anaximenes... declared that air is the underlying principle and that all the rest come to be from it by rarefaction and condensation. Fire, when air is rarefied; wind, then cloud, when condensed; water, then earth, then stones, and the rest come into being from these."

The emergence of this rational mode of thinking was likely influenced by Miletus's cosmopolitanism and its contact with the ancient cultures of the Near East. These intellectual foundations laid the groundwork for later developments in Greek philosophy and science.

== Religion and the Sacred Way ==
Miletus had several significant religious institutions, the most important of which was the sanctuary of Apollo at Didyma, located roughly 18 kilometers south of the city. The sanctuary was connected to the city by a ceremonial road known as the Sacred Way, which served as a route for ritual processions and pilgrimage festivals.

Didyma was renowned for its oracle, second in prestige only to that of Delphi. Prophecies were delivered by a priestess within a richly adorned temple complex. Archaeological discoveries along the Sacred Way have uncovered rows of consecrated statues and inscriptions, often commissioned by Milesian elites and foreign notables.

The sanctuary was a hub for both religion and politics, reinforcing Miletus' influence within Ionia and the wider Aegean. Religious practices at Didyma, including oracular consultation and ritual dedication, reflected and shaped the city's cultural identity and its connections with other Ionian communities.

== Apollo Delphinion ==
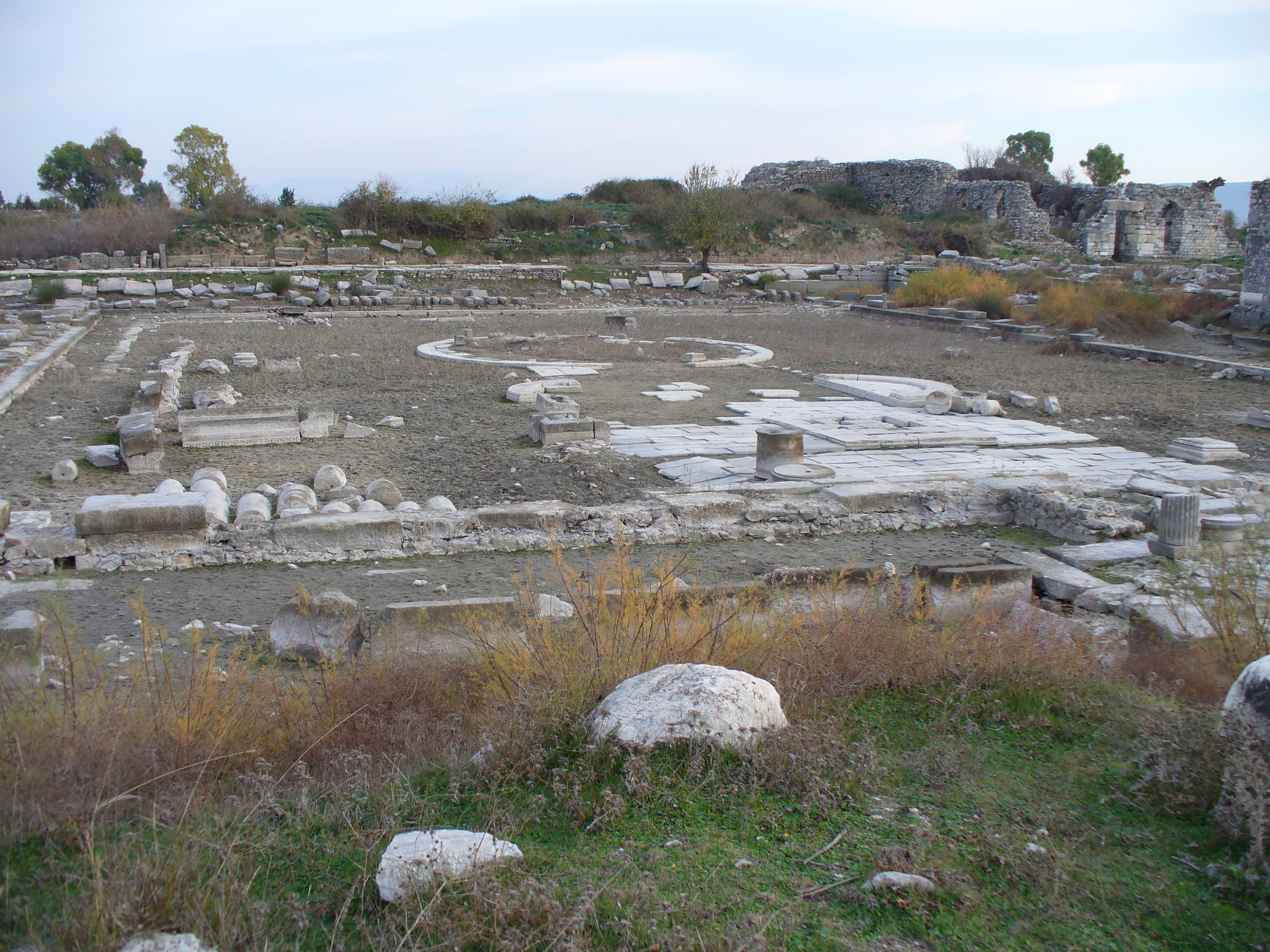
Sanctuary of Apollo

The Delphinion, sanctuary of Apollo Delphinios, was one of the most important civic–religious institutions of ancient Miletus. Constructed along the eastern edge of the Lions' Harbour, the sanctuary originated in the 6th century BCE and remained in use through the Roman period. Its Archaic form was destroyed in the Persian sack of 494 BCE but was rebuilt swiftly, highlighting its importance in Milesian political and ritual life.

The sanctuary functioned both as a religious center and a civic archive. Inscriptions recording citizenship scrutiny, ephebic oaths, lists of eponymous officials, decrees, and treaties attest to its administrative role. Ritual duties of the Molpoi, the guild responsible for musical and ceremonial functions, were administered from the site. Their responsibilities included offerings at designated stations along the Sacred Way, the ca. 18 km processional route leading from the Delphinion to the oracle of Apollo at Didyma. The sanctuary's shoreline placement, the presence of Kosmoi magistrates (a Cretan institutional title), and cultic implements described in inscriptions reflect its Cretan-linked origins within Milesian identity formation.

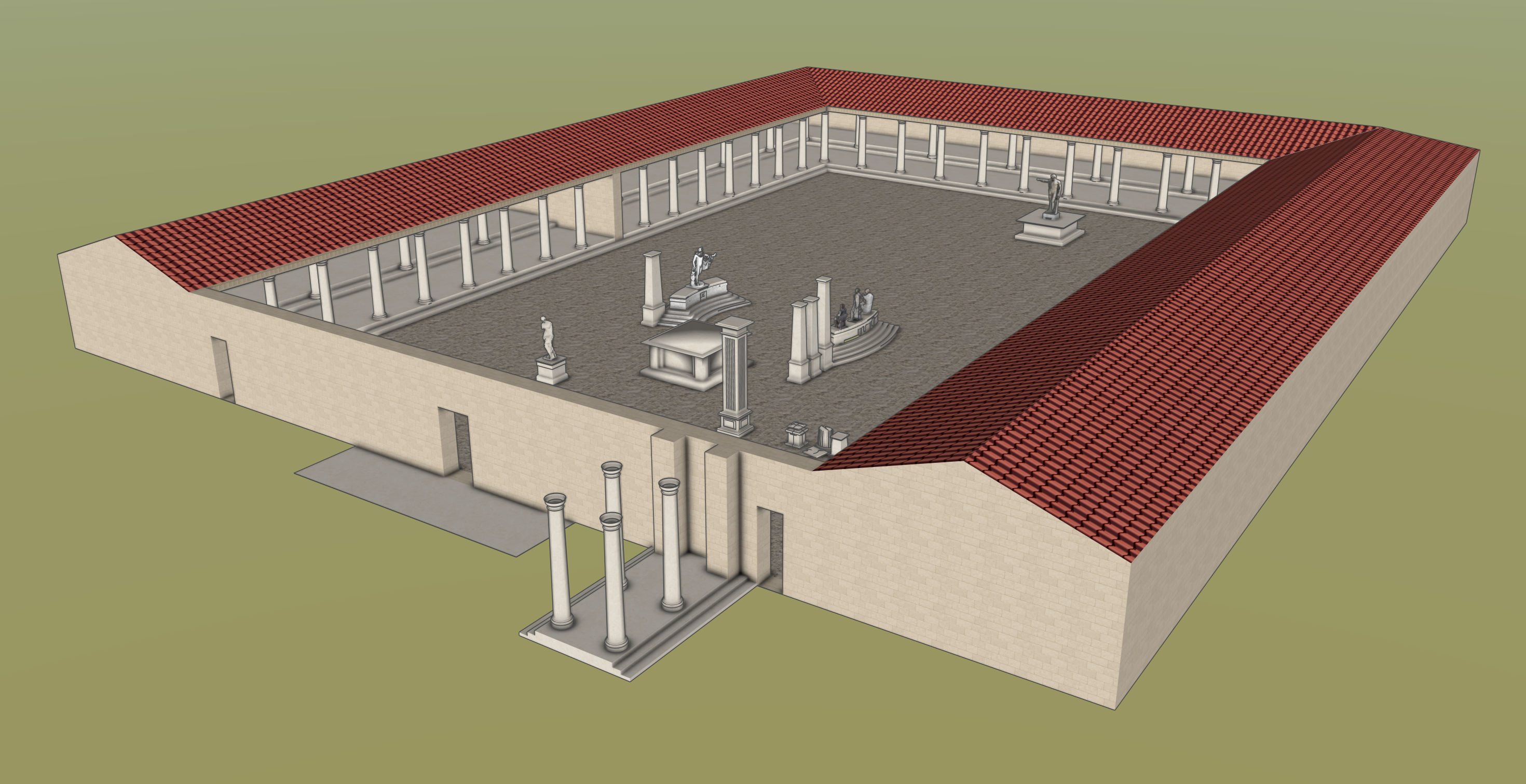
3D reconstruction of the Apollo Delphinion at Miletus

Architecturally, the Delphinion consisted of a large rectangular peristyle courtyard lined with colonnades and enclosed by exterior masonry walls, partially roofed with fired-clay imbrex and tegula tiles. Excavation reports and inscriptions indicate the presence of internal altars, statue bases, and cult installations distributed across the courtyard. The complex measured approximately 60 × 50 m. A published plan by the Foundation of the Hellenic World documents the arrangement of columns, entrances, and interior monuments.

Modern archaeological understanding of the Delphinion derives primarily from late 19th-century French excavations and early 20th-century German investigations. Contemporary digital reconstructions, informed by these excavation plans and inscriptions, illustrate the sanctuary's architectural organization and its role as a central institution in Milesian civic and ritual practices.

== Notable people ==
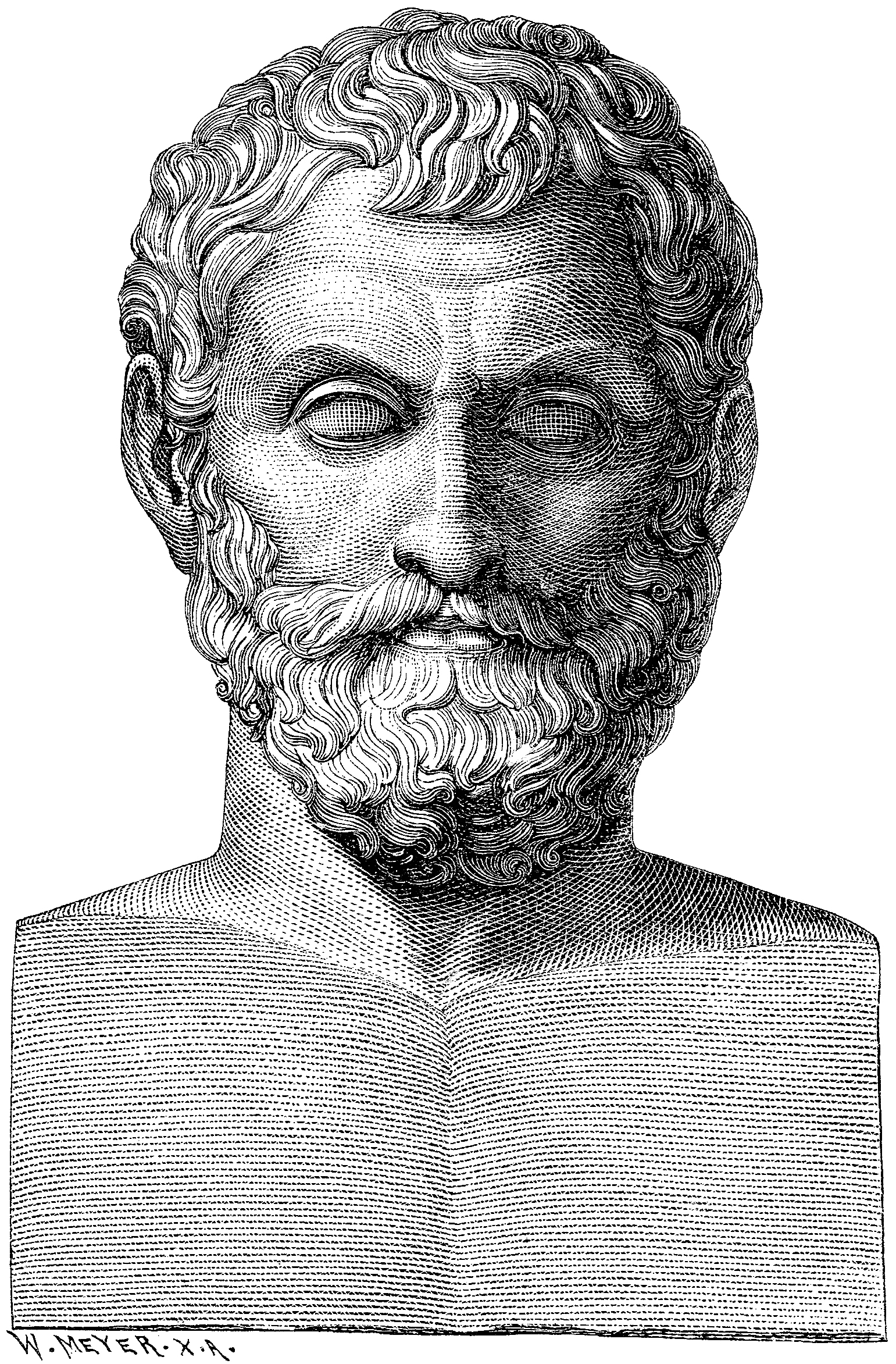
Thales of Miletus was a Greek mathematician, astronomer and pre-Socratic philosopher from the city. He is otherwise historically recognized as the first individual known to have entertained and engaged in scientific philosophy.

- Arctinus of Miletus (775 BC – 741 BC), epic poet
- Thales (c. 624 BC – c. 546 BC), Pre-Socratic philosopher
- Anaximander (c. 610 BC – c. 546 BC), Pre-Socratic philosopher and geographer
- Cadmus (fl. c. 550 BC), writer
- Anaximenes (c. 585 BC – c. 525 BC), Pre-Socratic philosopher
- Aristagoras (fl. 6th-5th century BC), Tyrant of Miletus
- Phocylides (born c. 560 BC), Greek gnomic poet
- Hecataeus (c. 550 BC – c. 476 BC), Greek historian
- Histiaeus (died 493 BC), ruler of Miletus
- Leucippus (fl. first half of 5th century BC), philosopher and originator of Atomism (his association with Miletus is traditional, but disputed)
- Hippodamus (c. 498 – 408 BC), urban planner
- Aspasia (c. 470 – 400 BC) courtesan, and mistress of Pericles, was born in Miletus
- Aristides (fl. 2nd century BC), writer
- Monime (died 72/71 BC), a Greek noblewoman and one of the wives of Mithridates VI Eupator
- Alexander Polyhistor (fl. 1st century AD), Greek scholar, born in Miletus before being taken as a slave to Rome
- Aeschines of Miletus (fl. 1st century AD), a distinguished orator in the Asiatic style
- Isidore (fl. 6th century AD), Greek architect
- Hesychius (fl. 6th century AD), Greek chronicler and biographer
- Timagenes or Timogenes, historian and rhetor
- Philiscus of Miletus, rhetor. Teacher of Neanthes of Cyzicus
- Hellanicus, historian
- Dionysicles (Ancient Greek: Διονυσικλῆς) of Miletus, sculptor. One of his famous works was a statue, at Leonidaion, of Democrates of Tenedos who was an ancient Olympic winner at wrestling
- Demodamas, Explorer, general and Satrap of Bactria and Sogdiana
- Baccheius or Bacchius of Miletus (Βακχεῖος), a writer. He wrote a work on agriculture.

== See also ==
- Cities of the ancient Near East

== References and sources ==
Sources

- Crouch, Dora P. (2004). Geology and Settlement: Greco-Roman Patterns. New York: Oxford University Press. ISBN 9780195083248.
- Nicol, Donald M. (1993) [1972]. The Last Centuries of Byzantium, 1261–1453 (Second ed.). Cambridge: Cambridge University Press. ISBN 978-0-521-43991-6.
- Trapp, Erich (2001). Prosopographisches Lexikon der Palaiologenzeit. Austrian Academy of Sciences. ISBN 978-3700130031.
