= Market Gate of Miletus =

Roman monument in Berlin

Coordinates: 52.521°N 13.396°E

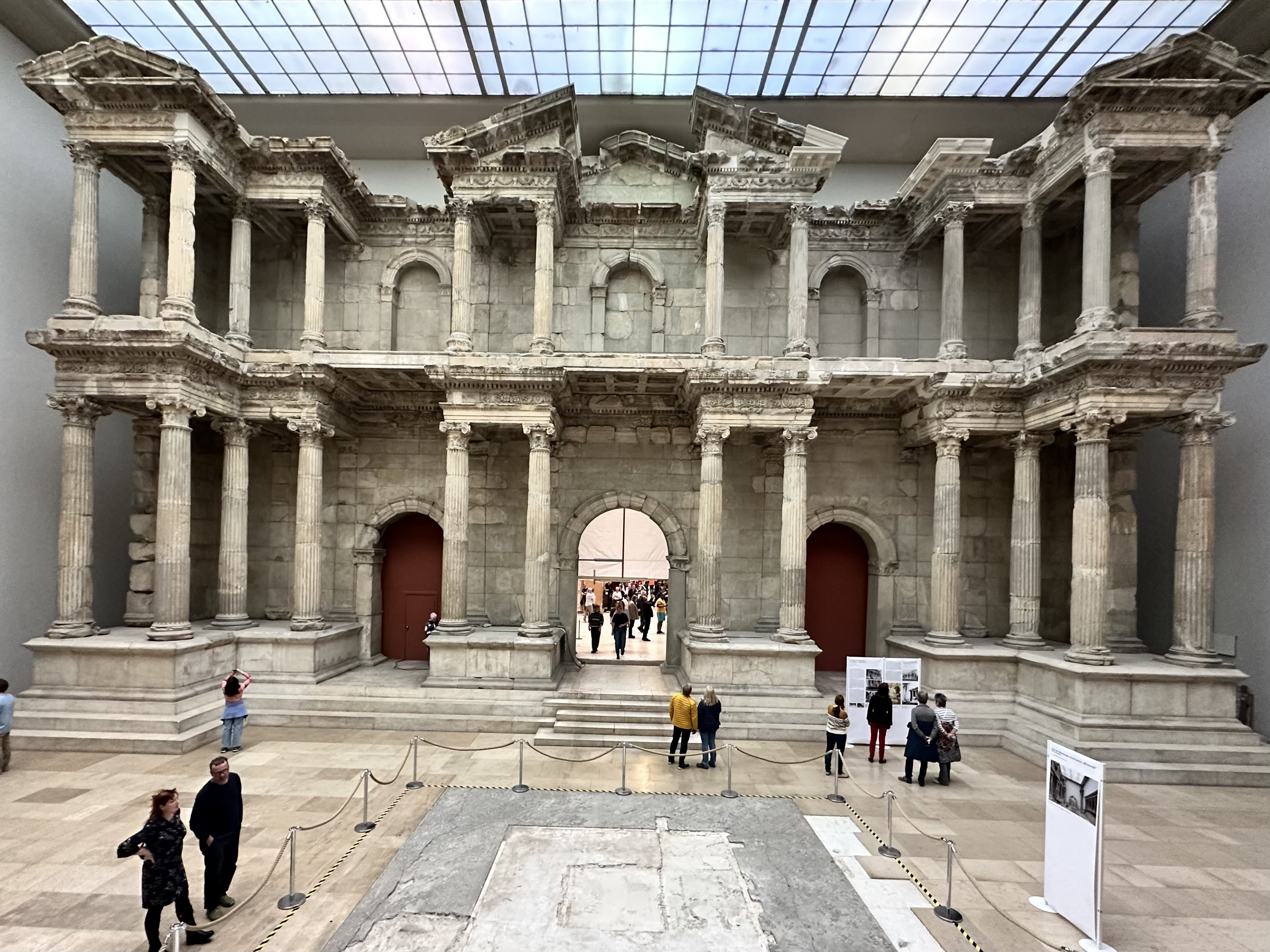
- Material: Marble
- Created: 2nd century AD
- Period/culture: Roman
- Place: Miletus
- Present location: Pergamon Museum, Berlin
- Registration: ?

The Market Gate of Miletus (German: das Markttor von Milet) is a large marble monument in the Pergamon Museum in Berlin, Germany. It was built in Miletus in the 2nd century AD and destroyed in an earthquake in the 10th or 11th century. In the early 1900s, it was excavated by a German archeological team, rebuilt, and placed on display in the museum in Berlin. Only fragments had survived and reconstruction involved significant new material, a practice which generated criticism of the museum. The gate was damaged in World War II and underwent restoration in the 1950s. Further restoration work took place in the first decade of the 21st century.

== Description ==
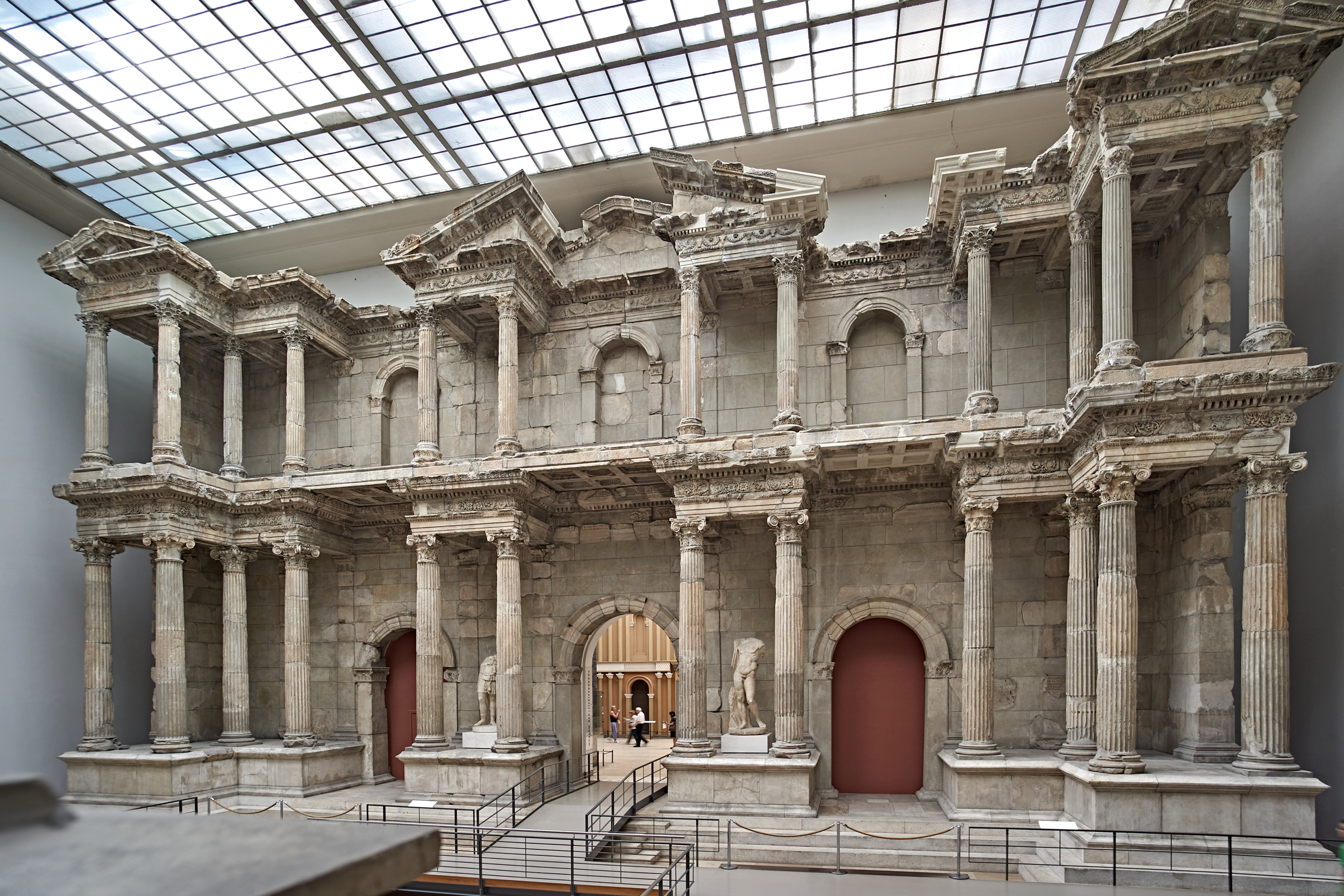
The room which houses the gate

The gate is a large marble monument, about 30 meters wide, 16 meters tall, and 5 meters deep. The two-story structure has three doorways and a number of projections and niches. At roof level and in between the floors are ornate friezes with bull and flower reliefs. The structure's protruding pediments are supported by Corinthian and Composite columns. The gate is not entirely original, as little of the base and lower floor survived the centuries; additional material includes brick, cement, and steel. The gate is affixed by iron girders to the wall behind it.

While in Miletus, niches on the second story featured statues of emperors, some fighting against barbarians.

== History ==
=== Miletus ===
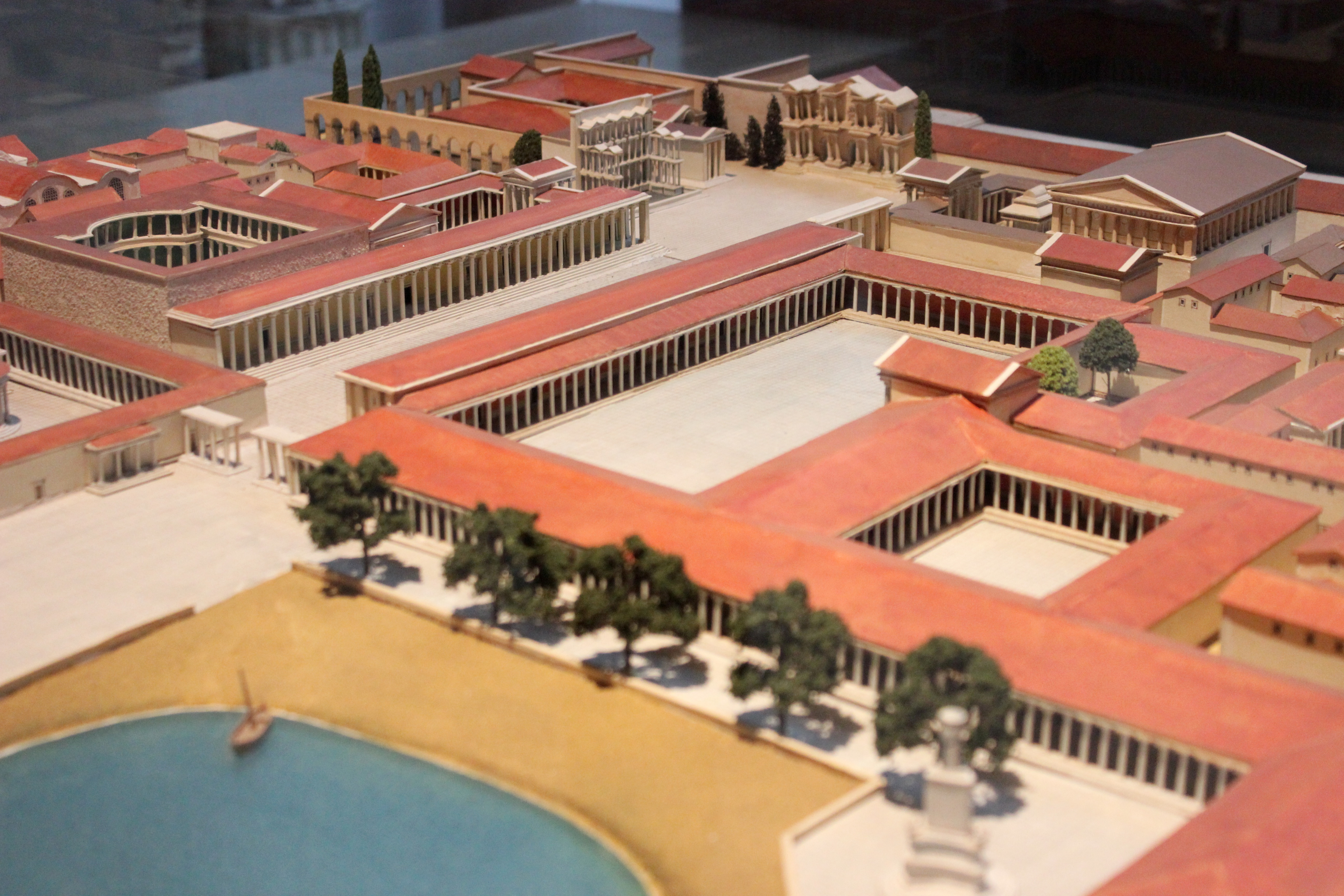
Scale model of Miletus in the Pergamon Museum, showing the market gate right of top-center.

The gate was built in the 2nd century AD, most likely during the reign of Emperor Hadrian about 120 to 130 AD. It replaced an existing Doric propylon and served as the northern entrance to the southern market, or agora, in Miletus, an ancient Greek city in what is now Turkey. The gate underwent restoration in the 3rd century following damage from an earthquake. When Justinian strengthened the defenses of Miletus in 538, the gate was incorporated into the city walls. In the 10th or 11th century, an earthquake caused the gate to collapse. Fragments of the structure were scavenged and used in surrounding buildings, but the majority subsided into the ground.

=== Excavation and reconstruction ===
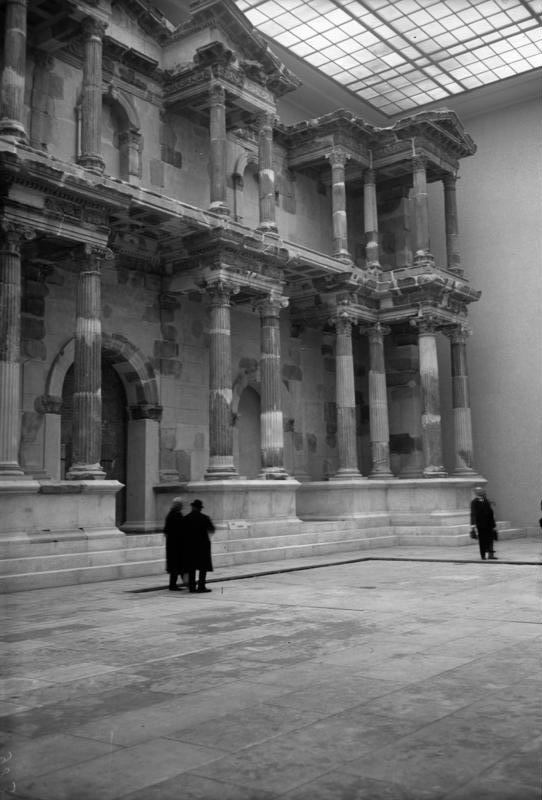
The gate shortly after reassembly; the differently colored sections show the incompleteness of the original

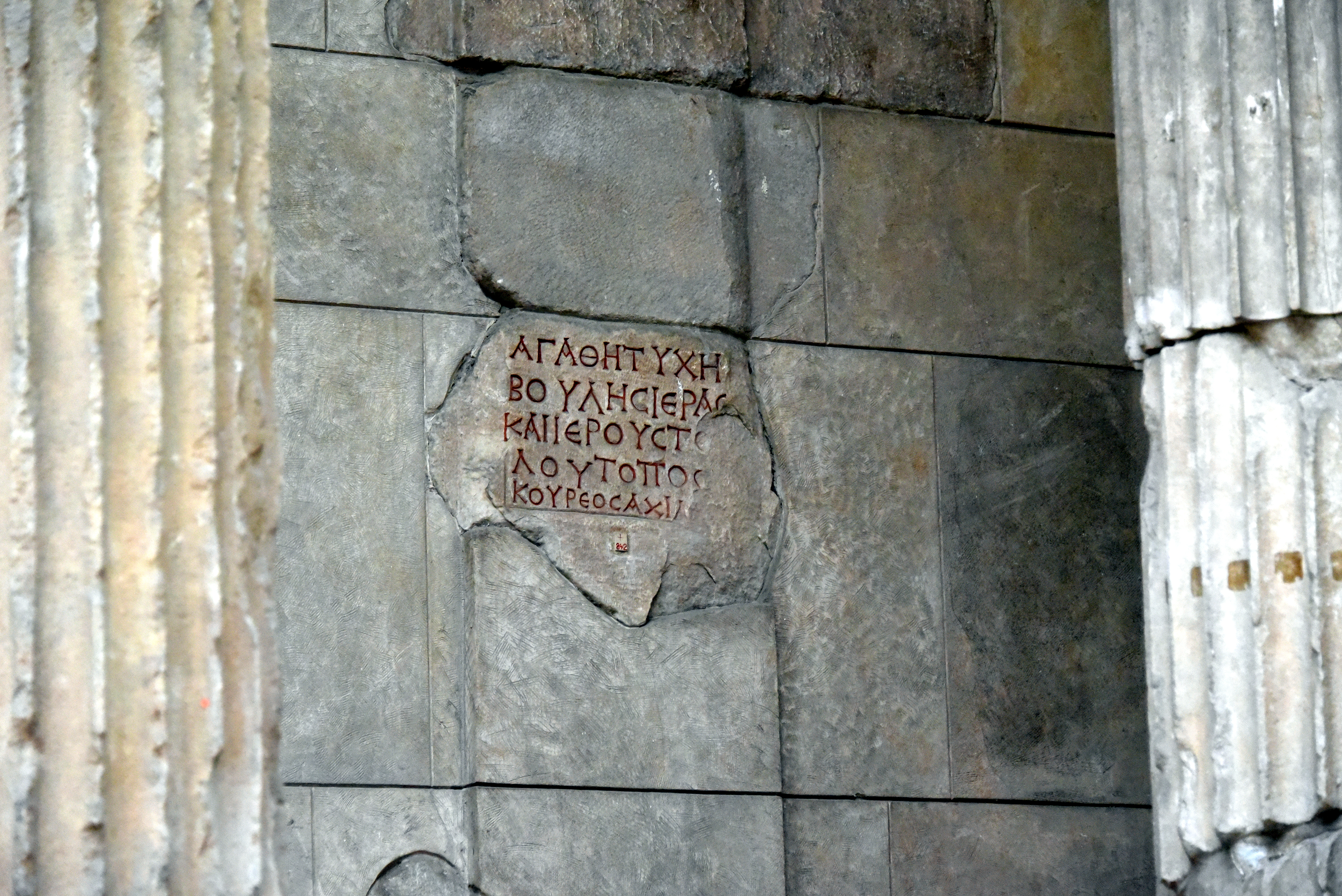
A Greek inscription on the back wall of the Market Gate of Miletus. The inscription is original but its surrounding blocks are modern. It translates to: "For the good fortune of the sacred city council and the sacred fleet! This is the place of the barber Achilleus."

German archaeologist Theodor Wiegand conducted a series of excavations in Miletus from 1899 through 1911. In 1903, the Market Gate of Miletus was excavated and from 1907 to 1908, fragments of the gate were transported to Berlin. Wiegand wrote in his diaries that he gave a presentation using models to Kaiser Wilhelm II, who was so impressed that he ordered the gate's reconstruction at full scale "like a theater backdrop" in the Pergamon Museum.

From 1925 to 1929, the gate was reassembled in the recently expanded museum from over 750 tons of fragments. However, the fragments did not constitute the entirety of the gate, and fill material had to be used in the reconstruction. Reconstruction began by assembling the middle-floor entablature and placing the second storey columns on top, followed by reconstructing the pediments. A base and ground floor were then inserted below. Brick and cement reinforced with steel supplemented the few remains of the lower structure. Original column fragments were bored out, leaving a thickness of 3 to 4 centimetres (1.2 to 1.6 in), and filled with steel and mortar. In the 1920s and 1930s, the museum was criticized for portraying its monuments as originals when they consisted significantly of non-original material.

=== World War II to present ===
The gate suffered significant damage from aerial bombardment in World War II. The roof and skylight above the gate were destroyed along with a protective brick wall. The right wing collapsed and the structure was damaged by fire and shrapnel; the loss of the brick wall also exposed the gate to weathering for two years. After winter passed, a temporary roof was constructed to protect the gate from the elements. From 1952 to 1954, the structure was extensively restored under the supervision of archaeologist H. H. Völker. However, little documentation exists detailing what specific work took place.

The next major restoration work took place in the decade of the 2000s. The gate had deteriorated from a combination of indoor atmospheric effects and incompatible building materials. Fragments of the gate have spontaneously loosened and fallen, necessitating the addition of a fence in front of the structure to protect visitors. The state of the structure was documented prior to restoration, from about 2003 through 2004, including the production of three-dimensional photogrammetric models due to the gate's architectural complexity. In December 2005, scaffolding was erected around the structure with a transparent protective cover on the outside and within the entrance tunnel. The scaffolding and cover were removed in late 2008 following the initial restoration phase.
