= Baccheius of Miletus =

Ancient Roman agronomist

Baccheius or Bacchius of Miletus was the author of a work on agriculture in ancient Rome. He was referred to by Pliny the Elder as one of the sources of his Natural History. He lived in or before the 1st century BCE.
