= Hermonassa (Pontus) =

Town in ancient Pontus

Coordinates: 41°02′03″N 39°33′12″E

Hermonassa (Ancient Greek: Ἑρμώνασσα) was a town of ancient Pontus on the Black Sea coast.

Its site is located near Akçaabat in Asiatic Turkey.
