= Baccheius the Elder =

Ancient Greek music writer

Baccheius (Ancient Greek: Βακχεῖος), also known as Baccheius the Elder or Baccheius Senior or Baccheius Geron (ὁ γέρων), was a writer on the musical system of ancient Greece.

We know nothing of his history. German classical scholar Johann Albert Fabricius gives a list of persons of the same name, and conjectures that he may have been the same Baccheius as was mentioned by 2nd-century Roman emperor and philosopher Marcus Aurelius as his first instructor.

== Works ==
He was the author of a short musical treatise in the form of a doctrine or catechism, called Introduction to the Art of Music (εἰσαγωγή τέχνης μουσικῆς). The treatise consists of brief and clear explanations of the principal subjects belonging to harmonics and rhythm.

Some writers consider his work a compilation of earlier texts, calling his work on harmonics a survey of the work of Greek philosophers Pythagoras and Aristoxenus. Baccheius reckons seven musical modes, corresponding to the seven species of octave anciently called by the same names. The work is also notable for preserving some examples of early musical notation.

Seventeenth-century Danish scholar Marcus Meibomius supposed that he lived after 2nd-century music theorist Ptolemy, who adopts the same system, and before 13th/14th-century Byzantine scholar Manuel Bryennios, in whose time an eighth (the Hypermixolydian) had been added. There is not broad consensus about his century, though many publications refer to him as having lived in the 3rd or 4th century CE.

== Editions ==
The Greek text of Baccheius was first edited by 17th-century French polymath Marin Mersenne, in his Commentary on the first six chapters of the Book of Genesis. It was also printed in a separate form, with a Latin version, by 17th-century scholar Frederic Morelli, and lastly by Marcus Meibomius. These were popularly circulated amongst late Renaissance and Baroque scholars, and held on par with those of works more renowned today such as those by Ptolemy.

== Epigram about Baccheius ==
An anonymous Greek epigram, in which Baccheius is mentioned, is printed by Meibomius in his preface, from the same manuscript which contained the text; also by Fabricius.
