= List of railway stations in Turkey =

Below is the list of railway stations in Turkey. Although there are hundreds of stations only those stations which can be linked to articles in Wikipedia are shown.

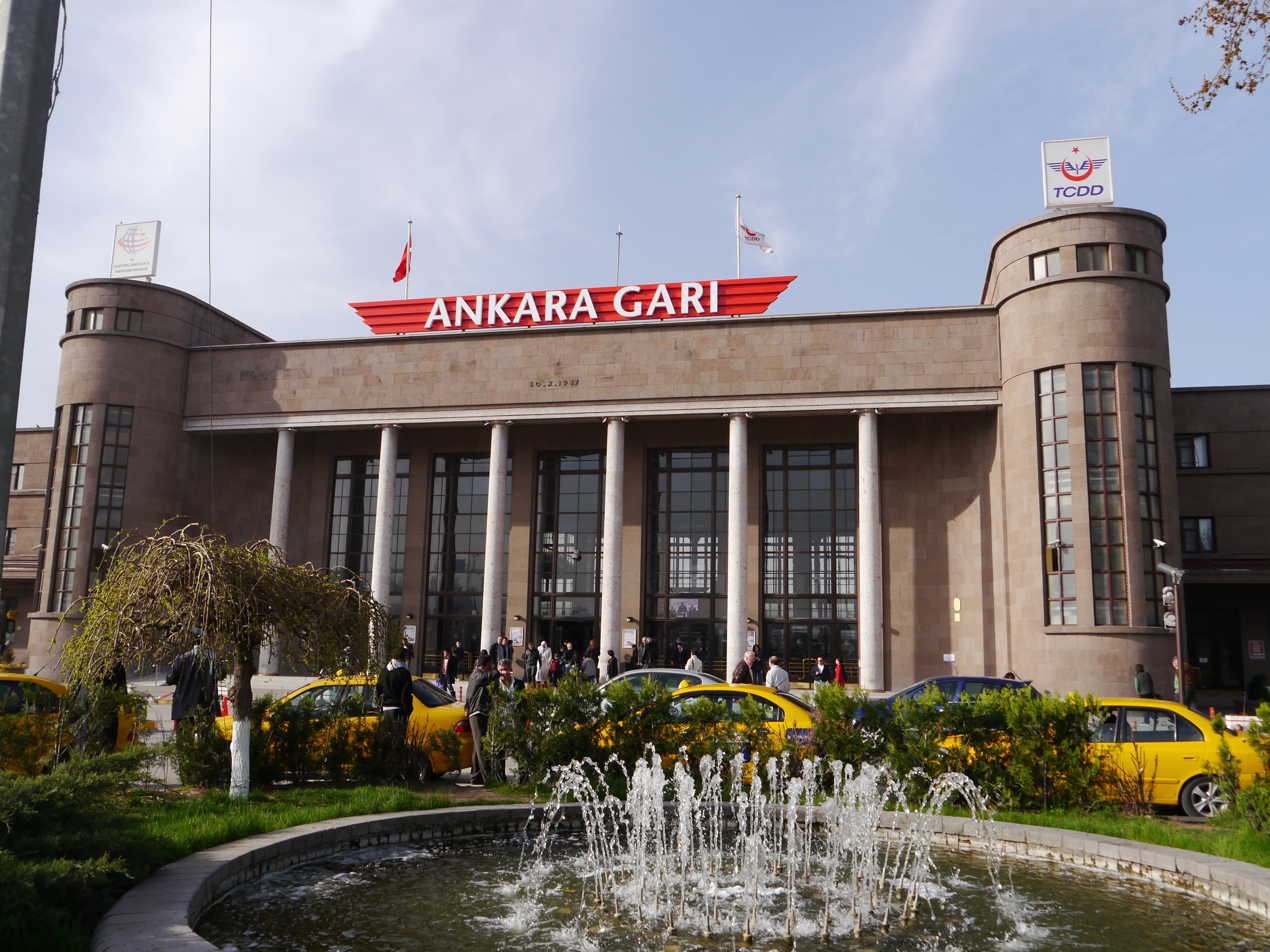
Ankara railway station

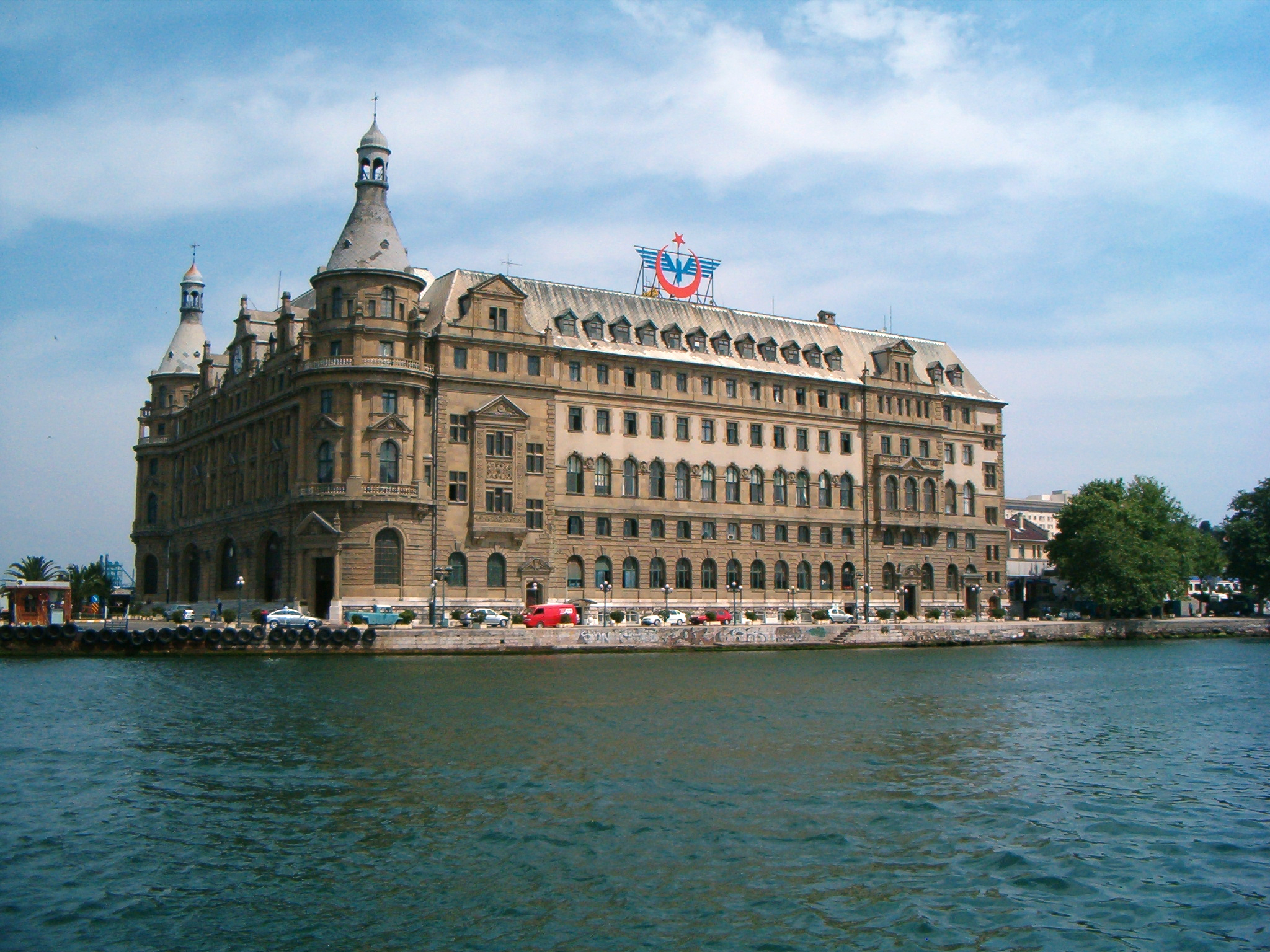
Haydarpaşa (İstanbul) terminal

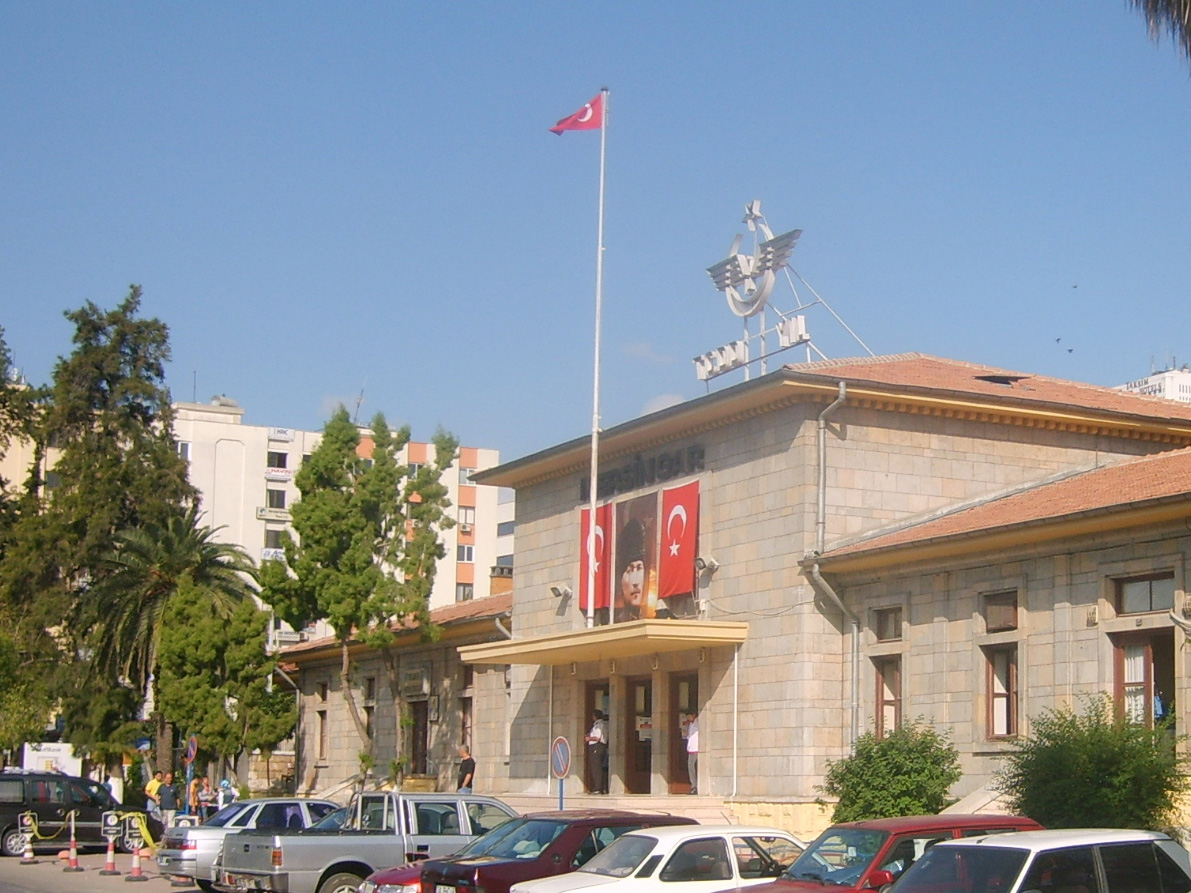
Mersin Terminal

(Turkey) Station	Province
Adana railway station	Adana
Adapazarı railway station	Sakarya
Afyon railway station	Afyon
Alpu railway station	Eskişehir
Ankara railway station	Ankara
Arifiye railway station	Sakarya
Balıkesir railway station	Balıkesir
Bandırma railway station	Balıkesir
Bilecik YHT railway station	Bilecik Province
Bozüyük YHT railway station	Bilecik
Çatal railway station	İzmir
Denizli railway station	Denizli
Emiralem railway station	İzmir
Enveriye railway station	Eskişehir
Eskişehir Central Station	Eskişehir
Gaziantep railway station	Gaziantep
Gebze railway station	Kocaeli
Goncalı railway station	Denizli
Halkapınar railway station	İzmir
İslahiye railway station	Gaziantep
Istanbul Bostancı railway station	Istanbul (Asian side)
Haydarpaşa railway station	Istanbul (Asian side)
Sirkeci railway station	Istanbul (European side)
Istanbul Söğütlüçeşme railway station	Istanbul (Asian side)
İzmir Alsancak Terminal	İzmir
İzmir Basmane Terminal	İzmir
İzmit railway station	Kocaeli
Kars railway station	Kars
Kayseri railway station	Kayseri
Konya railway station	Konya
Manisa railway station	Manisa
Mardin railway station	Mardin
Menemen railway station	İzmir
Mersin Terminal	Mersin
Mithatpaşa Station	Sakarya
Nusaybin railway station	Mardin
Ödemiş railway station	İzmir
Pancar railway station	İzmir
Pamukova YHT railway station	Sakarya
Polatlı YHT railway station	Ankara
Sapanca railway station	Sakarya
Sarayköy railway station	Denizli
Sarıkamış railway station	Kars
Selçuk railway station	İzmir
Süngütaşı railway station	Kars
Tarsus railway station	Mersin
Tatvan railway station	Bitlis
Torbalı railway station	İzmir
Yenice railway station	Mersin
