= Çamlık railway station =

Çamlık

General information
- Location: Çamlık-Yeniköy Yolu, Çamlık Mah. 35290; Selçuk, İzmir; Turkey
- Coordinates: 37.8801°N 27.3778°E
- System: TCDD Taşımacılık regional rail station
- Owner: Turkish State Railways
- Operator: TCDD Taşımacılık
- Line: İzmir–Denizli İzmir–Nazilli İzmir–Söke
- Platforms: 2 (1 side platform, 1 island platform)
- Tracks: 3

History
- Opened: 1 July 1866
- Rebuilt: 1976

Services
Preceding station	TCDD Taşımacılık	Following station
Selçuk towards İzmir (Basmane)	İzmir–Denizli	Ortaklar towards Denizli
Selçuk towards İzmir (Basmane)	İzmir–Nazilli	Ortaklar towards Nazilli
Selçuk towards İzmir (Basmane)	İzmir–Söke	Ortaklar towards Söke
Location

Çamlık railway station is a railway station near Çamlık, Turkey, in south İzmir Province. The station is the southernmost station within the province as well as the last station before Aydın Province. TCDD Taşımacılık operates daily regional train service from İzmir to Denizli, Nazilli and Söke.

The original station is located about 600 m (2,000 ft) north of the current station. The original station was opened on 1 July 1866 by the Ottoman Railway Company as part of their railway from İzmir (Smyrna) to Aydın. The Ottoman Railway Company, along with all its assets, were acquired by the Turkish State Railways in 1934. The 1866-station remained in service until 1976, when the railway was realigned through the hills north of Çamlık and the current station was built. In 1991 the Çamlık Railway Museum acquired the former station, as well as the old right-of-way, and is home to the largest steam-locomotive collection in Turkey.
