= Sazlıköy railway station =

Sazlıköy
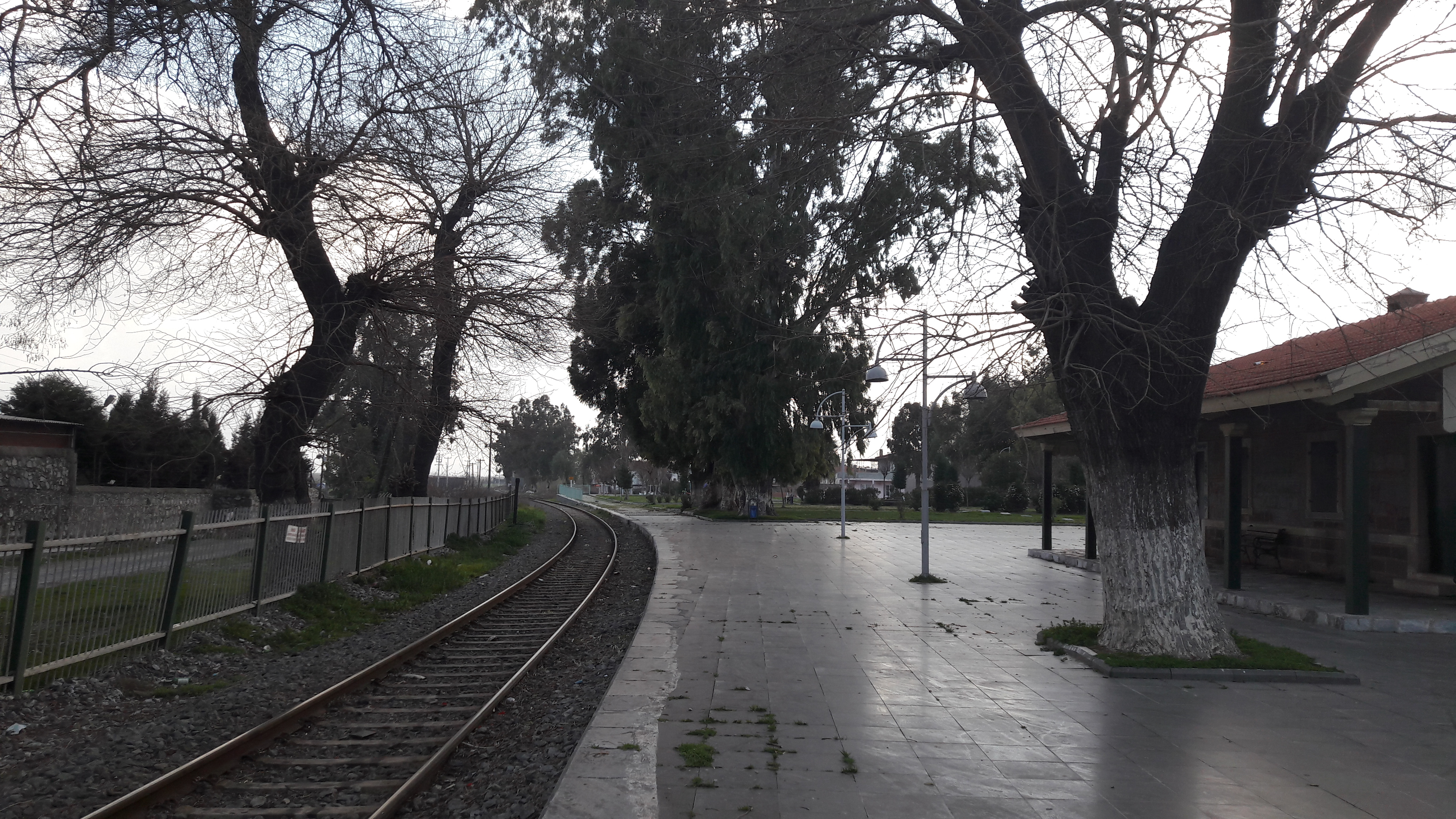

General information
- Location: Gps İstasyon Cd., Sazlı Mah. 09260; Söke, Aydın; Turkey
- Coordinates: 37.7832°N 27.4632°E
- System: TCDD Taşımacılık regional rail station
- Owner: Turkish State Railways
- Operator: TCDD Taşımacılık
- Line: İzmir–Söke Söke–Denizli Söke–Nazilli
- Platforms: 1 side platform
- Tracks: 1

History
- Opened: 1 July 1866
- Former names: 1 December 1890

Services
Preceding station	TCDD Taşımacılık	Following station
Ortaklar towards İzmir (Basmane)	İzmir–Söke	Söke Terminus
Söke Terminus	Söke–Denizli	Germencik towards Denizli
Söke Terminus	Söke–Nazilli	Germencik towards Nazilli
Location

Sazlıköy railway station (Turkish: Sazlıköy istasyonu) is a railway station in Sazlı, Turkey, just north of Söke. The station is located in the northern part of the town, adjacent to the D.525 state highway. TCDD Taşımacılık operates regional rail service from Söke to İzmir, Denizli and Nazilli, totalling five trains per day, in each direction. Sazlıköy station opened on 1 December 1890 by the Ottoman Railway Company along with the branch line to Söke.
