= Ortaklar railway station =

Ortaklar

General information
- Location: Ortaklar Mah. 35330; Germencik, Aydın; Turkey
- Coordinates: 37.8864°N 27.5026°E
- System: TCDD Taşımacılık regional rail station
- Owner: Turkish State Railways
- Operator: TCDD Taşımacılık
- Line: İzmir–Denizli İzmir–Nazilli İzmir–Söke
- Platforms: 1 island platform
- Tracks: 2

History
- Opened: 1 July 1866
- Former names: Reşadiye (1900s-1930); Pınarbaşı (1930-33)

Services
Preceding station	TCDD Taşımacılık	Following station
Çamlık towards İzmir (Basmane)	İzmir–Denizli	Germencik towards Denizli
Çamlık towards İzmir (Basmane)	İzmir–Nazilli	Germencik towards Nazilli
Çamlık towards İzmir (Basmane)	İzmir–Söke	Sazlıköy towards Söke
Location

Ortaklar railway station is a railway station in Ortaklar, Turkey. The station is located in the center of the town just west of the junction where the Ortaklar-Söke railway splits off and heads south to Söke. TCDD Taşımacılık operates daily regional train service from İzmir to Nazilli, Denizli and Söke. Ortaklar station was originally opened on 1 July 1866 by the Ottoman Railway Company, as part of their railway from İzmir to Aydın. The opening of the station led to the formation of a town which would become Ortaklar.
