= Selçuk railway station =

Selçuk
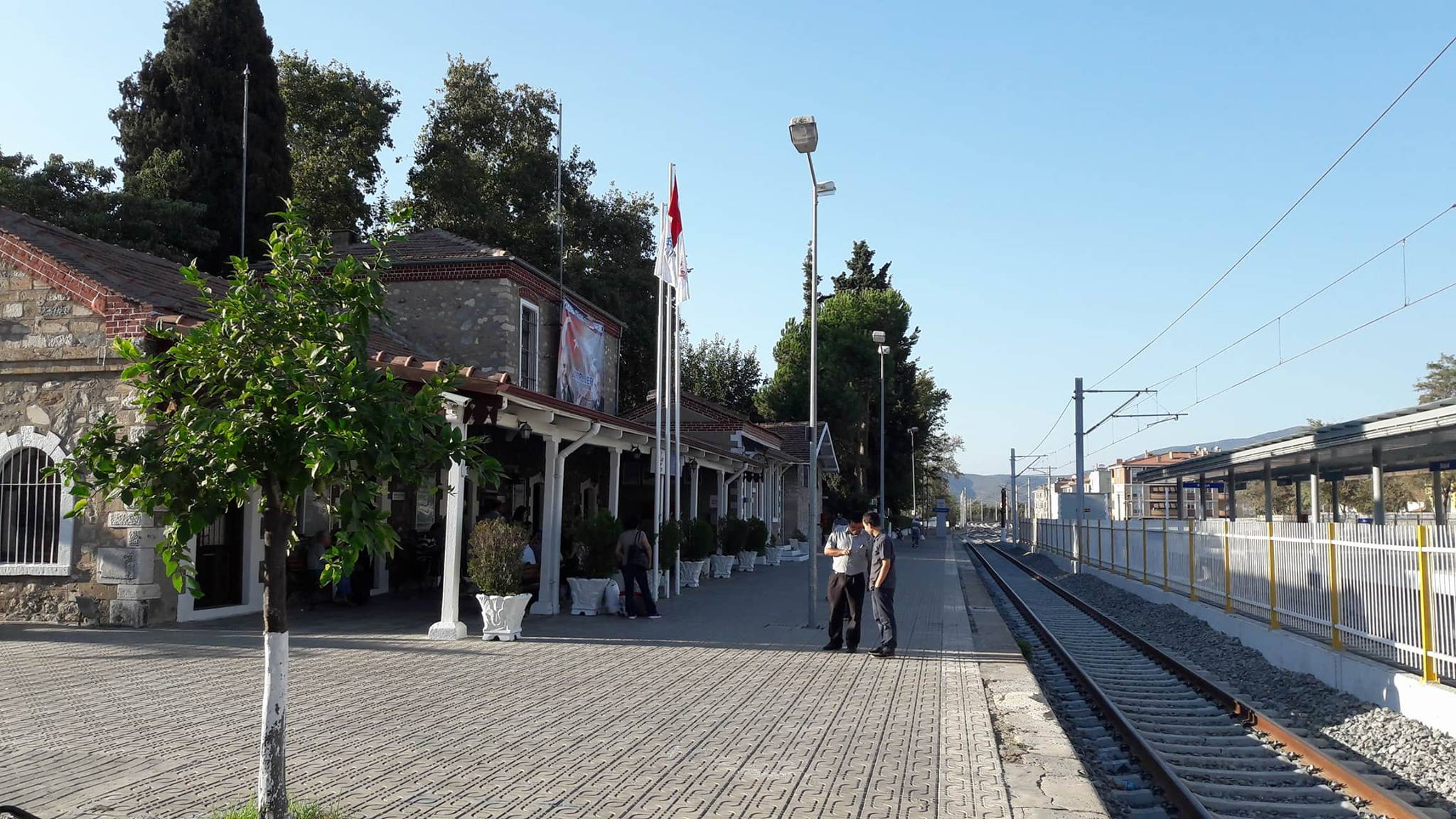
- TCDD station building with the İZBAN platform.

General information
- Location: Abuhayat Cd. 4, İsa Bey Mah. 35920; Selçuk, İzmir; Turkey
- Coordinates: 37.9509°N 27.3726°E
- System: TCDD regional rail station İZBAN commuter rail station
- Owner: Turkish State Railways
- Operator: TCDD Transport; İZBAN A.Ş.
- Line: İzmir-Eğirdir railway
- Platforms: 2 (1 side platform, 1 island platform)
- Tracks: 5

Construction
- Accessible: Yes

History
- Opened: September 1862; September 8, 2017
- Rebuilt: 2015-17

Services
Preceding station	TCDD Taşımacılık	Following station
Tepeköy towards İzmir (Basmane)	İzmir–Denizli	Çamlık towards Denizli
Tepeköy towards İzmir (Basmane)	İzmir–Nazilli	Çamlık towards Nazilli
Tepeköy towards İzmir (Basmane)	İzmir–Söke	Çamlık towards Söke
Preceding station	İZBAN	Following station
Belevi towards Tepeköy	Tepeköy-Selçuk	Terminus
Location

Selçuk railway station is a railway station in Selçuk, Turkey. The Turkish State Railways operates three regional train services from İzmir to Söke, Nazilli and Denizli, all servicing Selçuk. The station was originally built in 1862 by the Ottoman Railway Company and taken over by the state railways in 1935.

On September 8, 2017, the İZBAN commuter rail system was extended from Tepeköy to Selçuk. As of September 8, 2017, İZBAN operates 14 trains between Tepeköy and Selçuk.

== Gallery ==
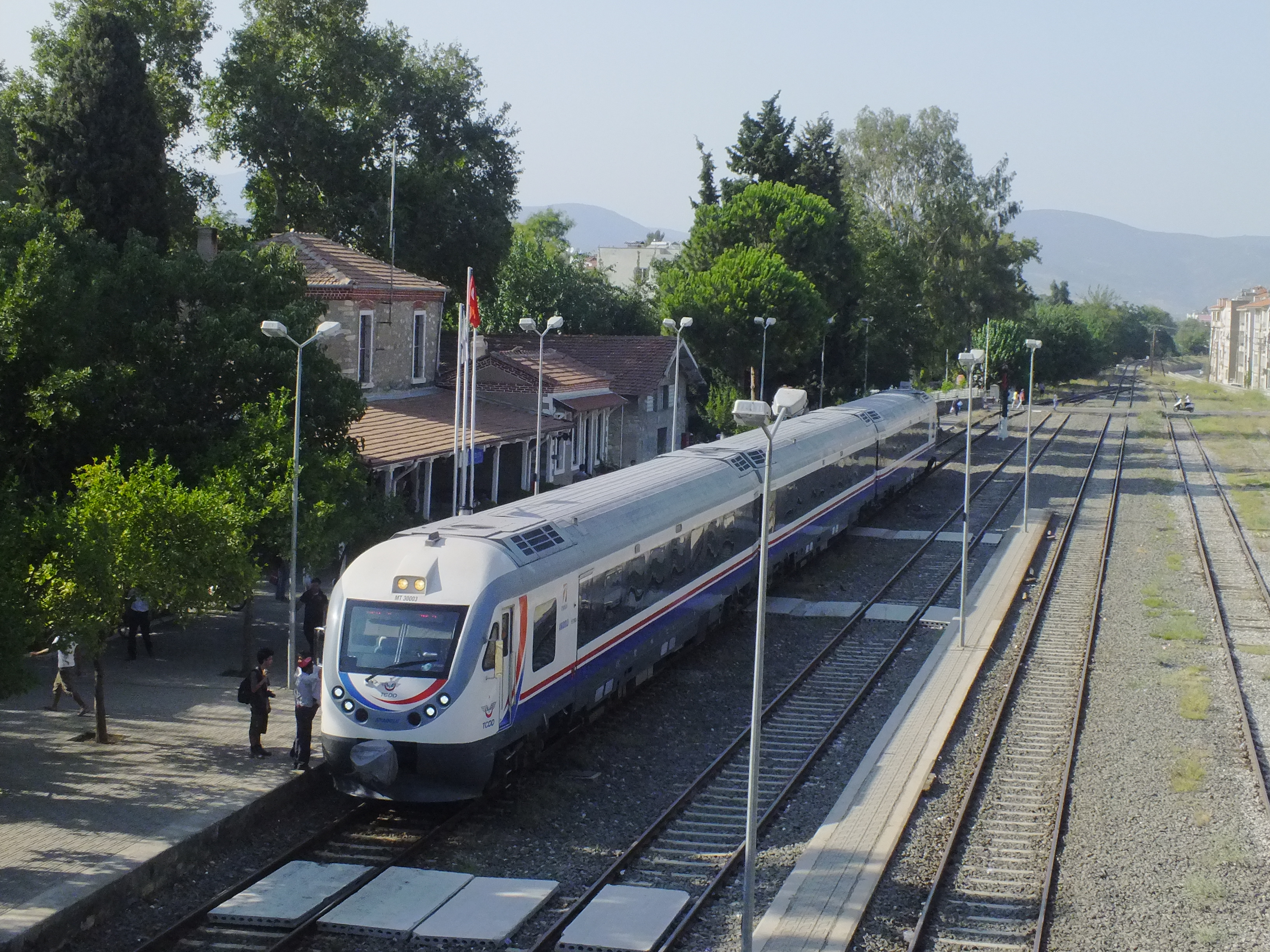
A southbound regional on track 1.

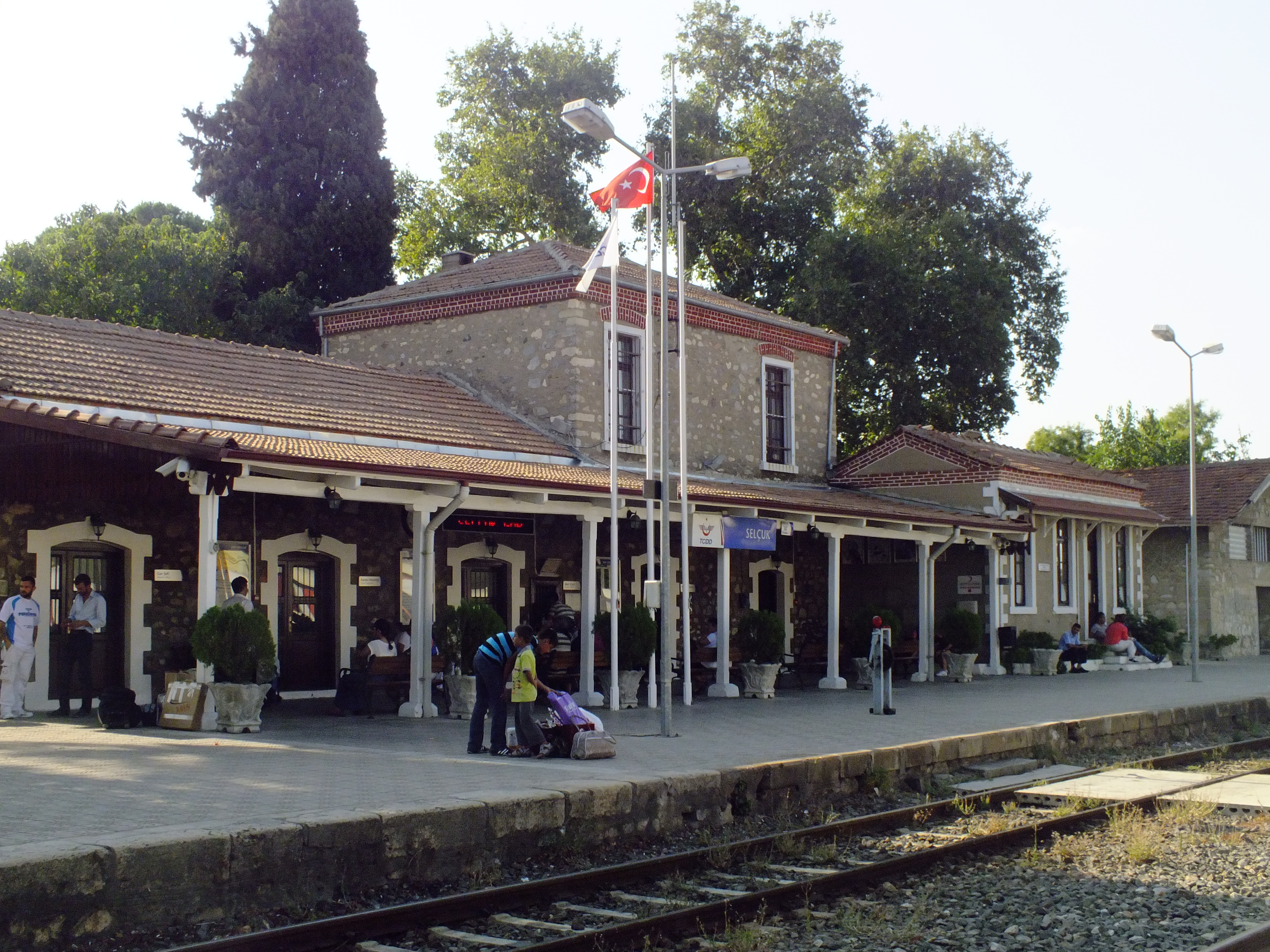
The station building.

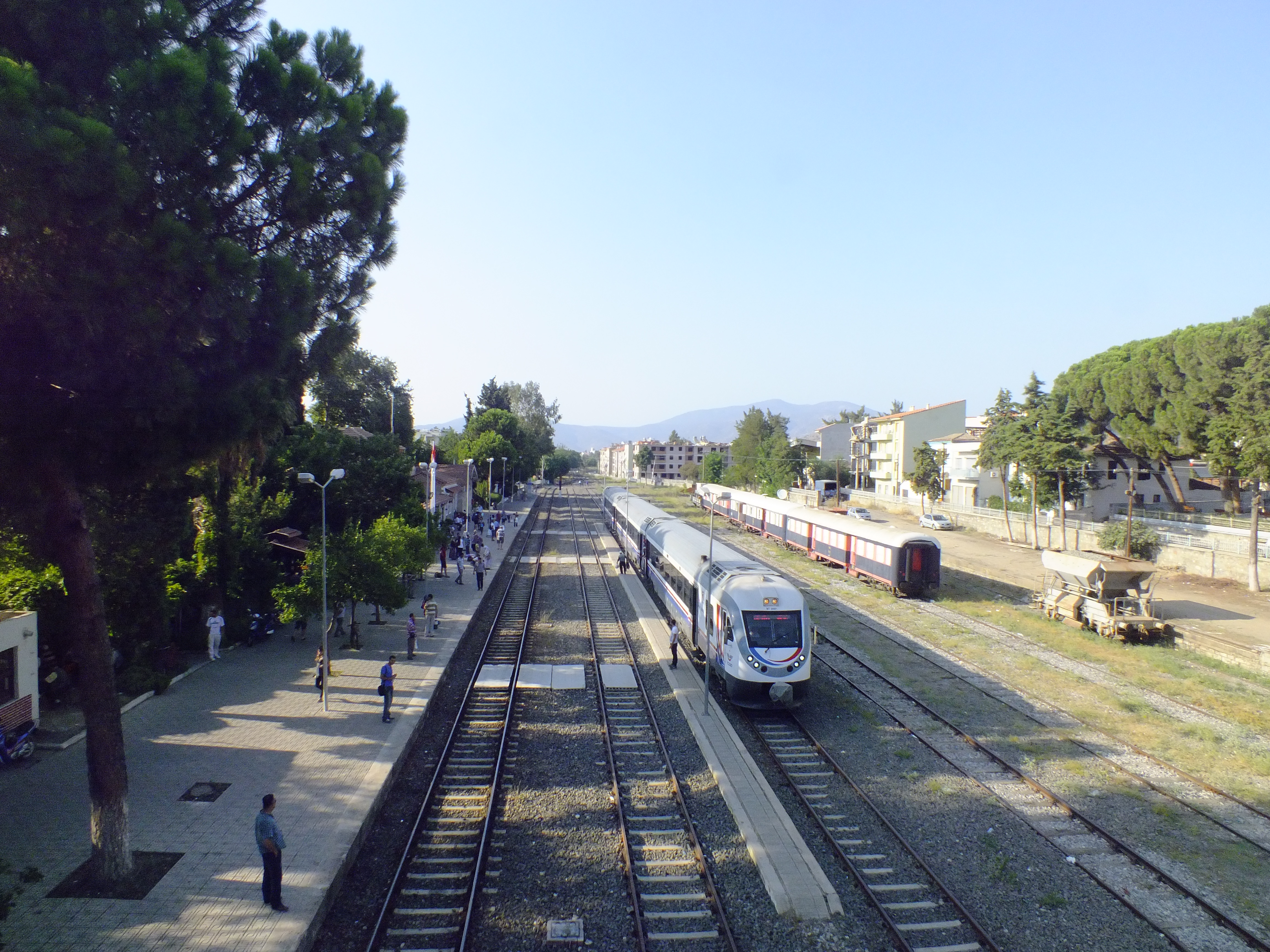
Selçuk station before the İZBAN platform was built.
