= İncirliova railway station =

Railway station in İncirliova, Turkey

İncirliova
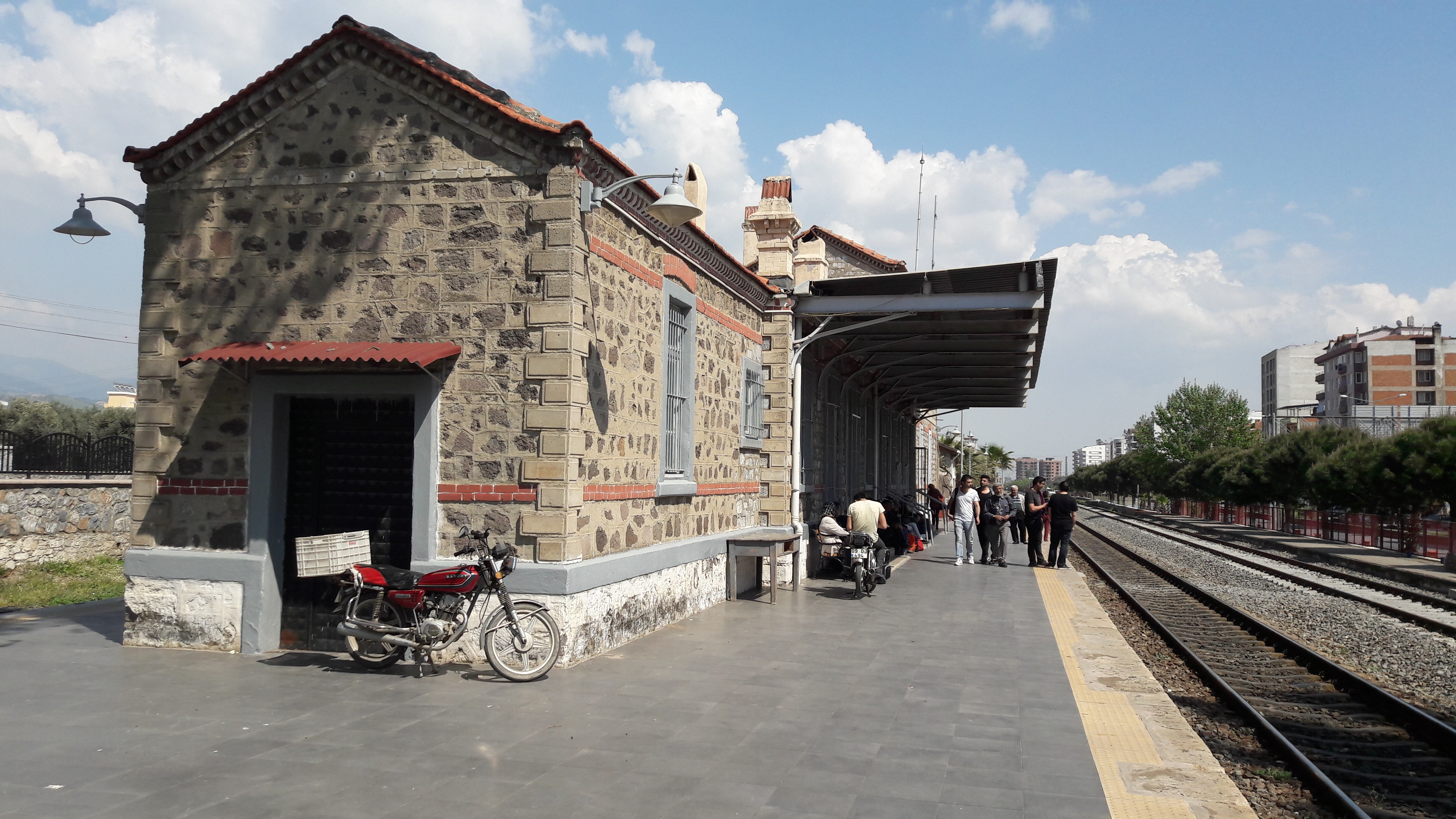

General information
- Location: Atatürk Cd., Park Mah. 09700; Germencik, Aydın; Turkey
- Coordinates: 37.8731°N 27.5957°E
- System: TCDD Taşımacılık regional rail station
- Owner: Turkish State Railways
- Operator: TCDD Taşımacılık
- Line: İzmir–Denizli İzmir–Nazilli Söke–Denizli Söke–Nazilli
- Platforms: 1 island platform
- Tracks: 2

History
- Opened: 1 July 1866

Services
Preceding station	TCDD Taşımacılık	Following station
Germencik towards İzmir (Basmane)	İzmir–Denizli	Aydın towards Denizli
Germencik towards İzmir (Basmane)	İzmir–Nazilli	Aydın towards Nazilli
Germencik towards Söke	Söke–Denizli	Aydın towards Denizli
Germencik towards Söke	Söke–Nazilli	Aydın towards Nazilli
Location

İncirliova railway station (Turkish: İncirliova istasyonu) is a railway station in İncirliova, Turkey. It is located adjacent to the D.550 state highway, known as Asteğmen Süleyman Çamlıca Boulevard within the town. TCDD Taşımacılık operates regional train service from İzmir and Söke to Nazilli and Denizli, via Aydın.

İncirliova station was built in 1866 by the Ottoman Railway Company as part of their railway from İzmir to Aydın.

== Pictures ==
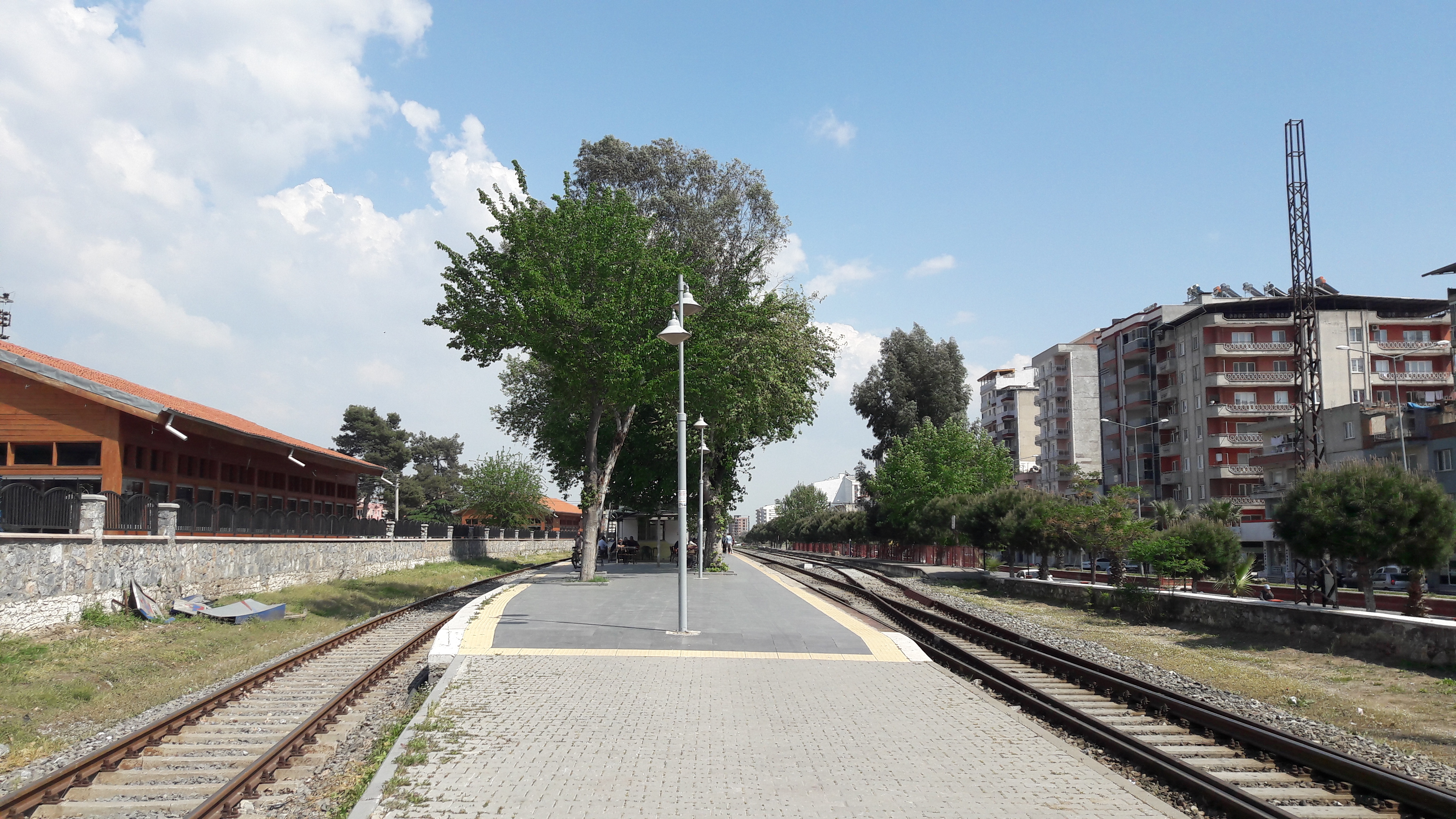
Looking east, from the west end of the station.

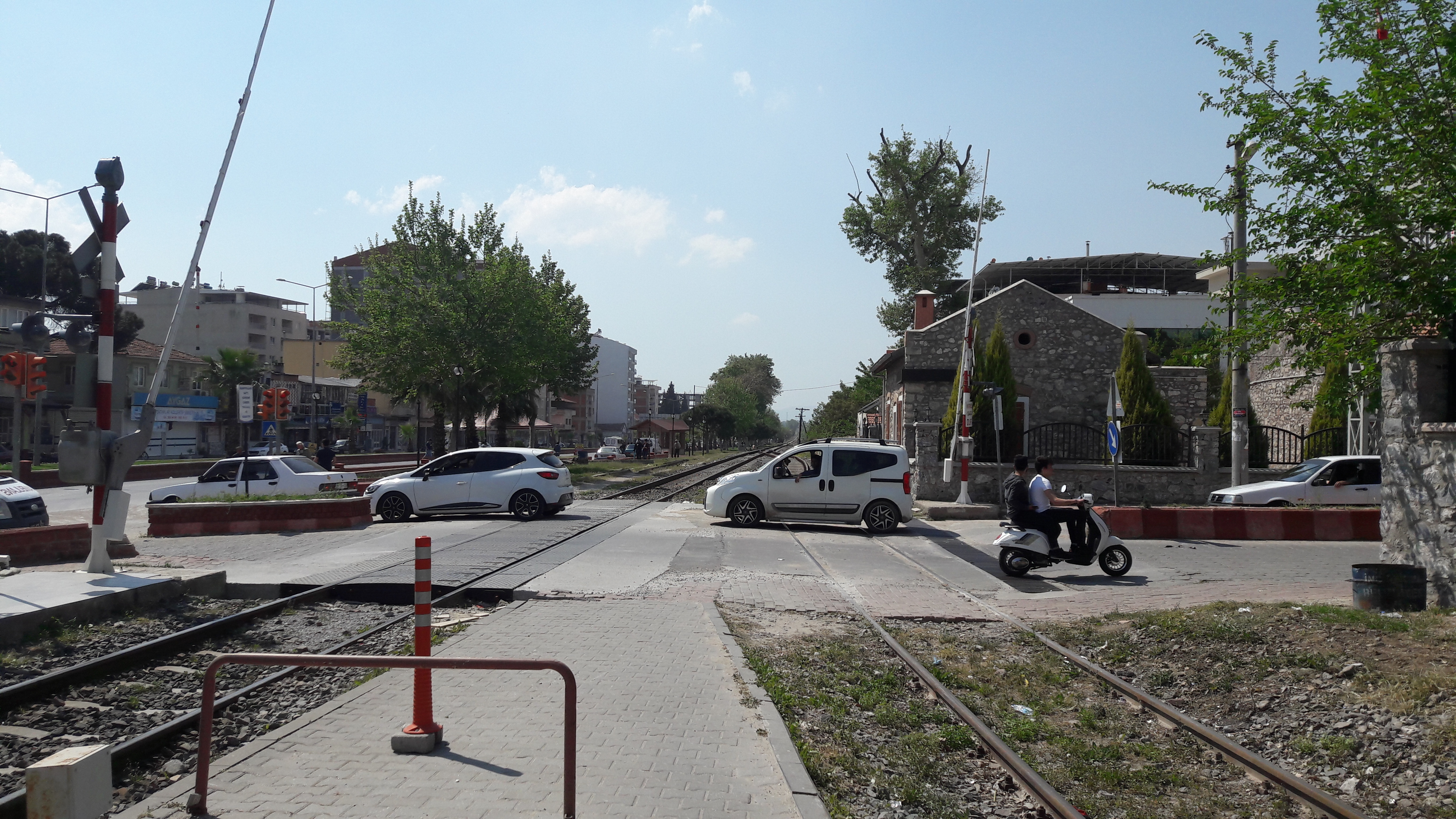
Looking west, from the west end of the station.
