= Germencik railway station =

Railway station in Germencik, Aydın, Turkey

Germencik
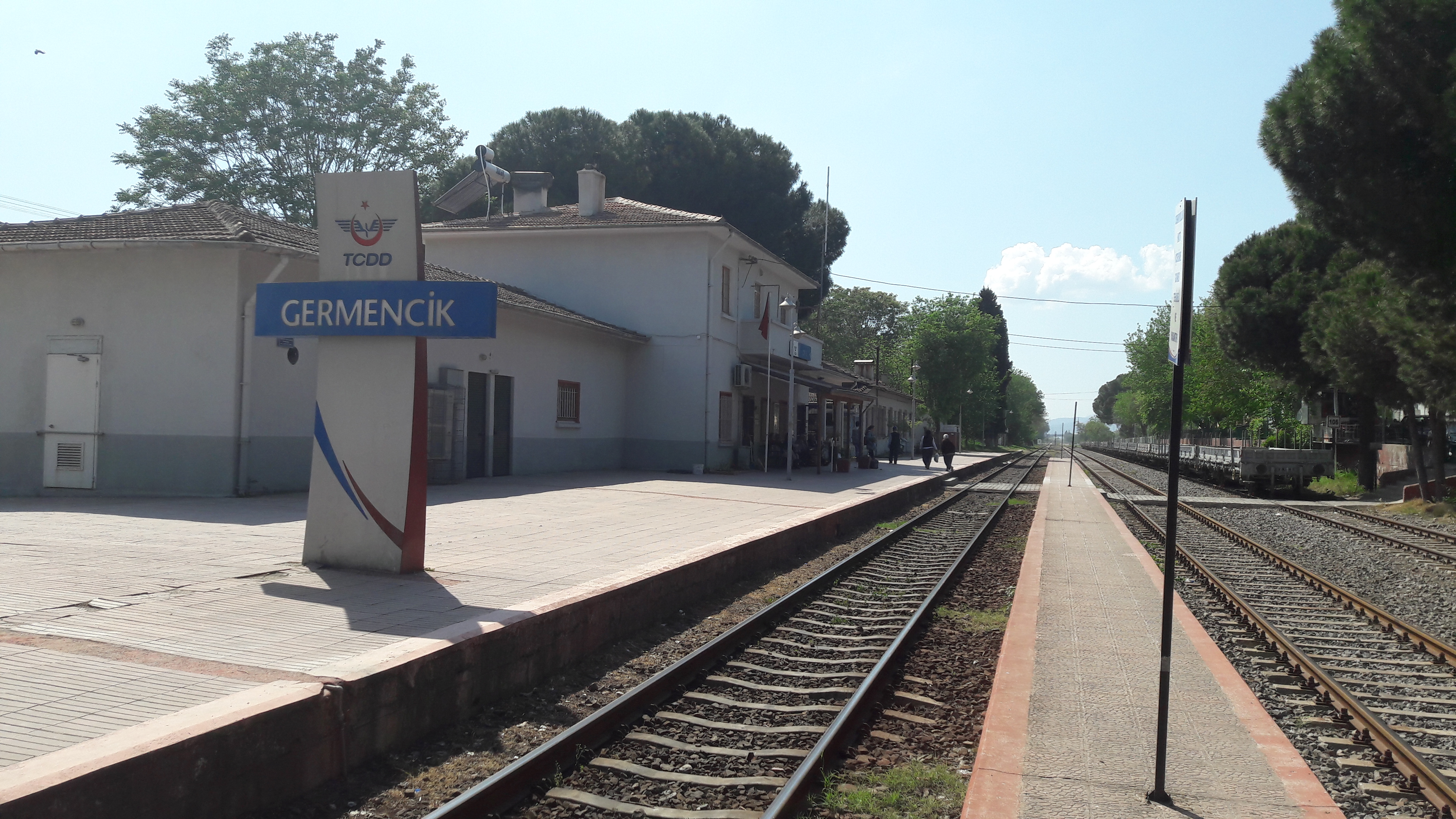

General information
- Location: Atatürk Cd., Park Mah. 09700; Germencik, Aydın; Turkey
- Coordinates: 37°52′23.3″N 27°35′44.3″E
- System: TCDD Taşımacılık regional rail station
- Owner: Turkish State Railways
- Operator: TCDD Taşımacılık
- Line: İzmir–Denizli İzmir–Nazilli Söke–Denizli Söke–Nazilli
- Platforms: 2 (1 side platform, 1 island platform)
- Tracks: 2

History
- Opened: 1 July 1866

Services
Preceding station	TCDD Taşımacılık	Following station
Ortaklar towards İzmir (Basmane)	İzmir–Denizli	İncirliova towards Denizli
Ortaklar towards İzmir (Basmane)	İzmir–Nazilli	İncirliova towards Nazilli
Sazlıköy towards Söke	Söke–Denizli	İncirliova towards Denizli
Sazlıköy towards Söke	Söke–Nazilli	İncirliova towards Nazilli
Location

Germencik railway station (Turkish: Germencik istasyonu) is a railway station in Germencik, Turkey. It is located adjacent to the D.550 state highway, known as Atatürk Avenue within the town. TCDD Taşımacılık operates regional train service from İzmir and Söke to Nazilli, Isparta and Denizli, via Aydın.

Germencik station was built in 1866 by the Ottoman Railway Company as part of their railway from İzmir to Aydın. Germencik became a major center for the production of olive oil once the railway was built and exported it to the outside world via the station.
