= Horsunlu railway station =

HORSUNLU
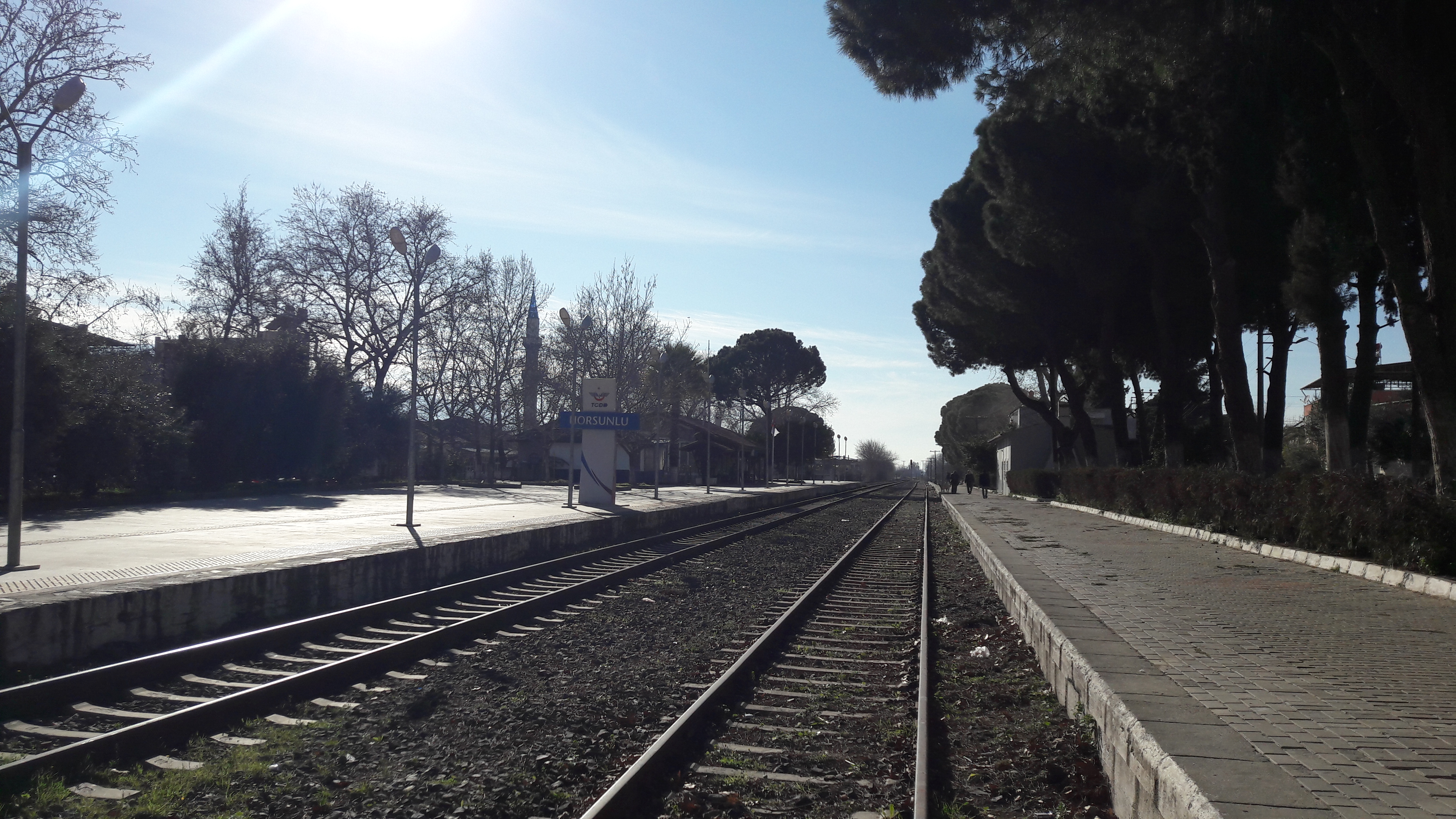

General information
- Location: 8. Sk., Horsunlu Mah., 09965; Kuyucak, Aydın; Turkey
- Coordinates: 37.9147°N 28.5911°E
- System: TCDD Taşımacılık regional rail station
- Owner: Turkish State Railways
- Operator: TCDD Taşımacılık
- Line: İzmir–Denizli Söke–Denizli
- Platforms: 2 side platforms
- Tracks: 2

Construction
- Structure type: At-grade

History
- Opened: 1 July 1882

Services
Preceding station	TCDD Taşımacılık	Following station
Pamukören towards İzmir (Basmane)	İzmir–Denizli	Buharkent towards Denizli
Pamukören towards Söke	Söke–Denizli	Buharkent towards Denizli
Location
- Location within Turkey

Horsunlu railway station (Turkish: Horsunlu istasyonu) is a railway station in Horsunlu, Turkey. TCDD Taşımacılık operates daily regional rail service from İzmir to Denizli, a total of seven trains a day in each direction. Horsunlu station was opened on 1 July 1882 by the Ottoman Railway Company.
