= Buharkent railway station =

Turkish train station

BUHARKENT
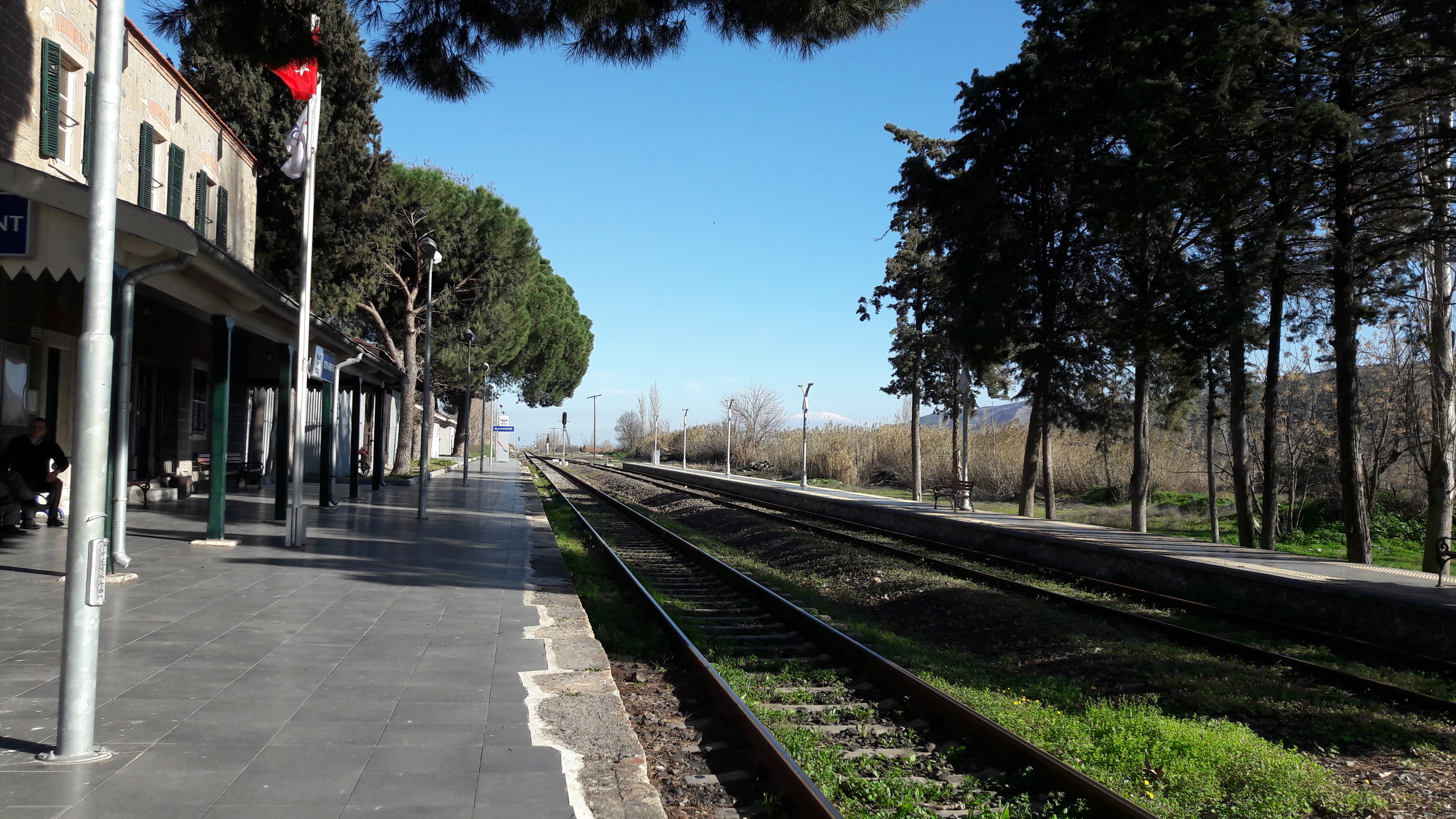

General information
- Location: Menderes Cd., Menderes Mah. 09670; Buharkent, Aydın; Turkey
- Coordinates: 37.9528°N 28.7385°E
- System: TCDD Taşımacılık regional rail station
- Owner: Turkish State Railways
- Operator: TCDD Taşımacılık
- Line: İzmir–Denizli Söke–Denizli
- Platforms: 2 side platforms
- Tracks: 2

Construction
- Structure type: At-grade

History
- Opened: 1 July 1882

Services
Preceding station	TCDD Taşımacılık	Following station
Horsunlu towards İzmir (Basmane)	İzmir–Denizli	Sarayköy towards Denizli
Horsunlu towards Söke	Söke–Denizli	Sarayköy towards Denizli
Location

Buharkent railway station (Turkish: Buharkent istasyonu) is a railway station in Buharkent, Turkey. TCDD Taşımacılık operates daily regional rail service from İzmir to Denizli, a total of seven trains a day in each direction. Located just south of the town, Buharkent station was opened on 1 July 1882 by the Ottoman Railway Company.
