= Goncalı railway station =

Railway station in Goncalı, Turkey

GONCALI
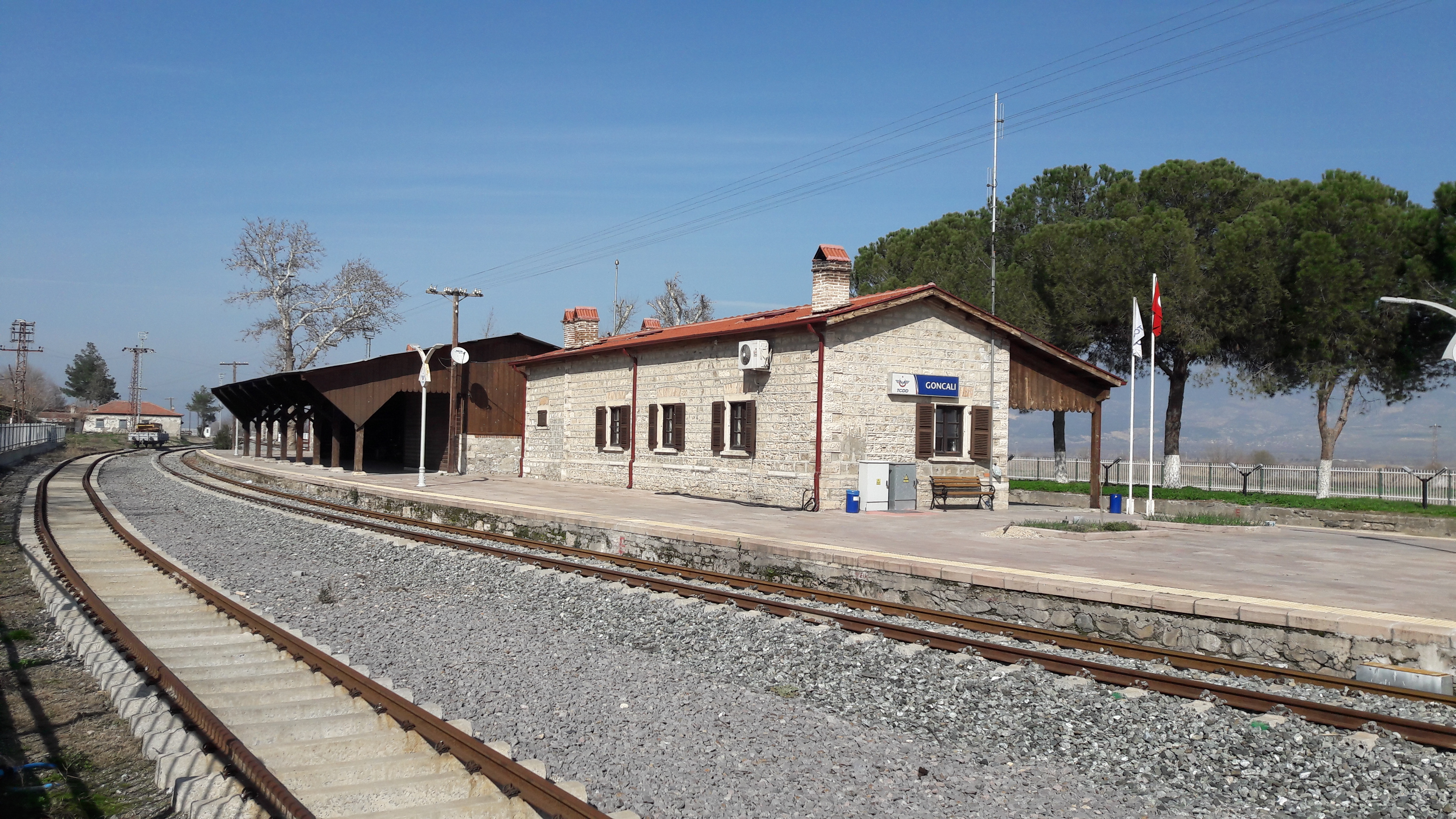

General information
- Location: 1. Sk., Goncalı Mah. 20180; Pamukkale, Denizli; Turkey
- Coordinates: 37.848002°N 29.116652°E
- System: TCDD Taşımacılık intercity and regional rail station
- Owner: Turkish State Railways
- Operator: TCDD Taşımacılık
- Line: Pamukkale Express İzmir–Denizli Söke–Denizli
- Platforms: 1 island platform
- Tracks: 2
- Connections: Denizli Ulaşım: 7/1

Construction
- Structure type: At-grade

History
- Opened: 13 October 1889

Services
Preceding station	TCDD Taşımacılık	Following station
Reverses direction	Pamukkale Express	Kaklık towards Eskişehir
Reverses direction	Pamukkale Express	Denizli Terminus
Sarayköy towards İzmir (Basmane)	İzmir–Denizli	Denizli Terminus
Sarayköy towards Söke	Söke–Denizli	Denizli Terminus
Location

Goncalı railway station (Turkish: Goncalı istasyonu) is a railway station in the village of Goncali, Turkey. Located about 9 km (5.6 mi) northwest of Denizli, the station is also a junction where the Goncalı-Denizli railway splits off from the İzmir-Eğirdir railway. TCDD Taşımacılık operates a daily inter-city train from Denizli to Eskişehir, as well as regional train service to İzmir and Söke. Goncalı station was opened on 13 October 1889 by the Ottoman Railway Company.
