= Çavdar =

Çavdar may refer to:

- Chavdar (tribe), Tatar tribe in medieval Anatolia
- Meryem Betül Çavdar (born 2000), Turkish para taekwondo practitioner
- Çavdar, Yenipazar, rural neighborhood in Aydın Province, Turkey
- Çavdar, Söke, rural neighborhood in Aydın Province, Turkey
