= Sarayköy railway station =

SARAYKÖY
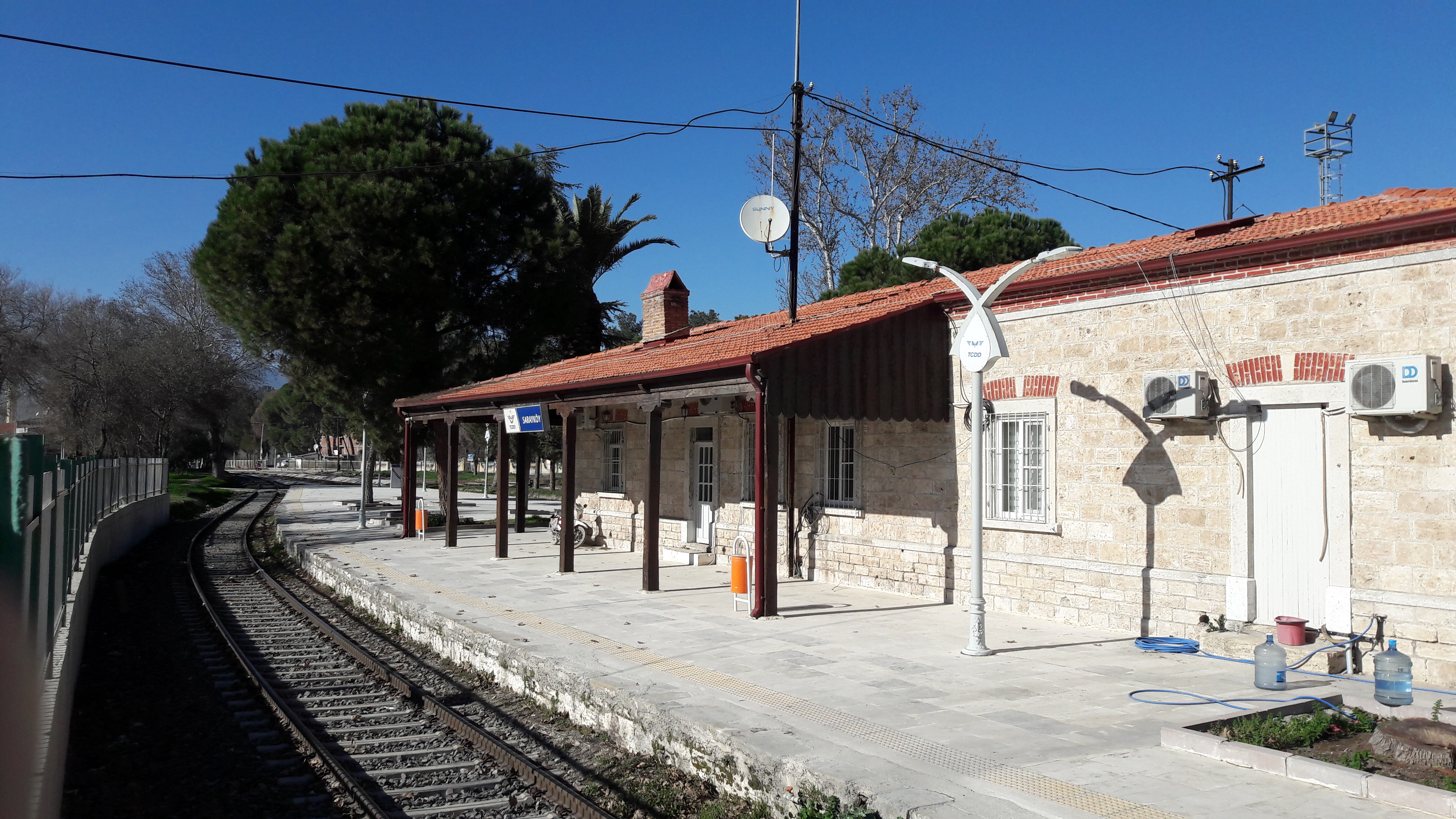

General information
- Location: Tarım Cd., Sakarya Mah. 20300; Sarayköy, Denizli; Turkey
- Coordinates: 37.913958°N 28.925866°E
- System: TCDD Taşımacılık regional rail station
- Owner: Turkish State Railways
- Operator: TCDD Taşımacılık
- Line: İzmir–Denizli Söke–Denizli
- Platforms: 1 island platform
- Tracks: 2

Construction
- Structure type: At-grade

History
- Opened: 1 July 1882

Services
Preceding station	TCDD Taşımacılık	Following station
Buharkent towards İzmir (Basmane)	İzmir–Denizli	Goncalı towards Denizli
Buharkent towards Söke	Söke–Denizli	Goncalı towards Denizli
Location

Sarayköy railway station (Turkish: Sarayköy istasyonu) is a railway station in Sarayköy, Turkey. TCDD Taşımacılık operates daily regional rail service from İzmir to Denizli, a total of seven trains a day in each direction. Sarayköy was opened on 1 July 1882 by the Ottoman Railway Company.
