= Kaklık railway station =

Railway station in Turkey

KAKLIK

General information
- Location: Kaklık Mah. 20240; Honaz, Denizli; Turkey
- Coordinates: 37.827222°N 29.414722°E
- System: TCDD Taşımacılık intercity rail station
- Owner: Turkish State Railways
- Operator: TCDD Taşımacılık
- Line: Pamukkale Express
- Platforms: 1 side platform
- Tracks: 1

Construction
- Structure type: At-grade

History
- Opened: 13 October 1889
- Rebuilt: 2011

Services
| Preceding station | TCDD Taşımacılık | Following station |
|---|---|---|
| Goncalı towards Denizli | Pamukkale Express | Bozkurt towards Eskişehir |
Location

Kaklık railway station (Turkish: Kaklık istasyonu) is a railway station in Kaklık, Turkey, about 28 km (17 mi) east of Denizli. TCDD Taşımacılık operates a daily intercity train, the Pamukkale Express, from Eskişehir to Denizli.

Kaklık station was originally built by the Ottoman Railway Company in 1889 and later taken over by the Turkish State Railways in 1934. In 2011 the station platform was rebuilt and the station house renovated along with the construction of a small logistics center.
