= Skolopoeis =

Town of ancient Ionia

Coordinates: 37°37′36″N 27°12′49″E

Skolopoeis was a town of ancient Ionia.

There was a sanctuary of the Eleusinian Demeter (Ancient Greek: Δήμητρος Ἐλευσινίης).

Its site is located near Doğanbey, Asiatic Turkey.
