= Ağaçlı, Söke =

Ağaçlı
- Neighbourhood
- Location in Turkey Ağaçlı (Turkey Aegean)
- Coordinates: 37.7333°N 27.3333°E
- Country: Turkey
- Province: Aydın
- District: Söke
- Population (2022): 434
- Time zone: UTC+3 (TRT)

Ağaçlı is a neighbourhood in the municipality and district of Söke, Aydın Province, Turkey. Its population is 434 (2022).

== History ==
The former name of the village was Tırha.
