= Yamaç, Söke =

Yamaç
- Neighbourhood
- Location in Turkey Yamaç (Turkey Aegean)
- Coordinates: 37°47′36″N 27°24′53″E
- Country: Turkey
- Province: Aydın
- District: Söke
- Population (2022): 146
- Time zone: UTC+3 (TRT)

Yamaç is a neighbourhood in the Söke district, Aydın Province, Turkey. Its population is 146 (2022).
