= Kemalpaşa, Söke =

Village in Turkey

Kemalpaşa
- Neighbourhood
- Location in Turkey Kemalpaşa (Turkey Aegean)
- Coordinates: 37°45′06″N 27°24′02″E
- Country: Turkey
- Province: Aydın
- District: Söke
- Population (2024): 4,137
- Time zone: UTC+3 (TRT)

Kemalpaşa is a neighbourhood in the municipality and district of Söke, Aydın Province, Turkey. Its population is 4,137 (2024).
