= Denizli Bus Terminal =

Bus station in Denizli, Turkey

Denizli Bus Terminal Denizli Şehirlerarası Otobüs Terminali
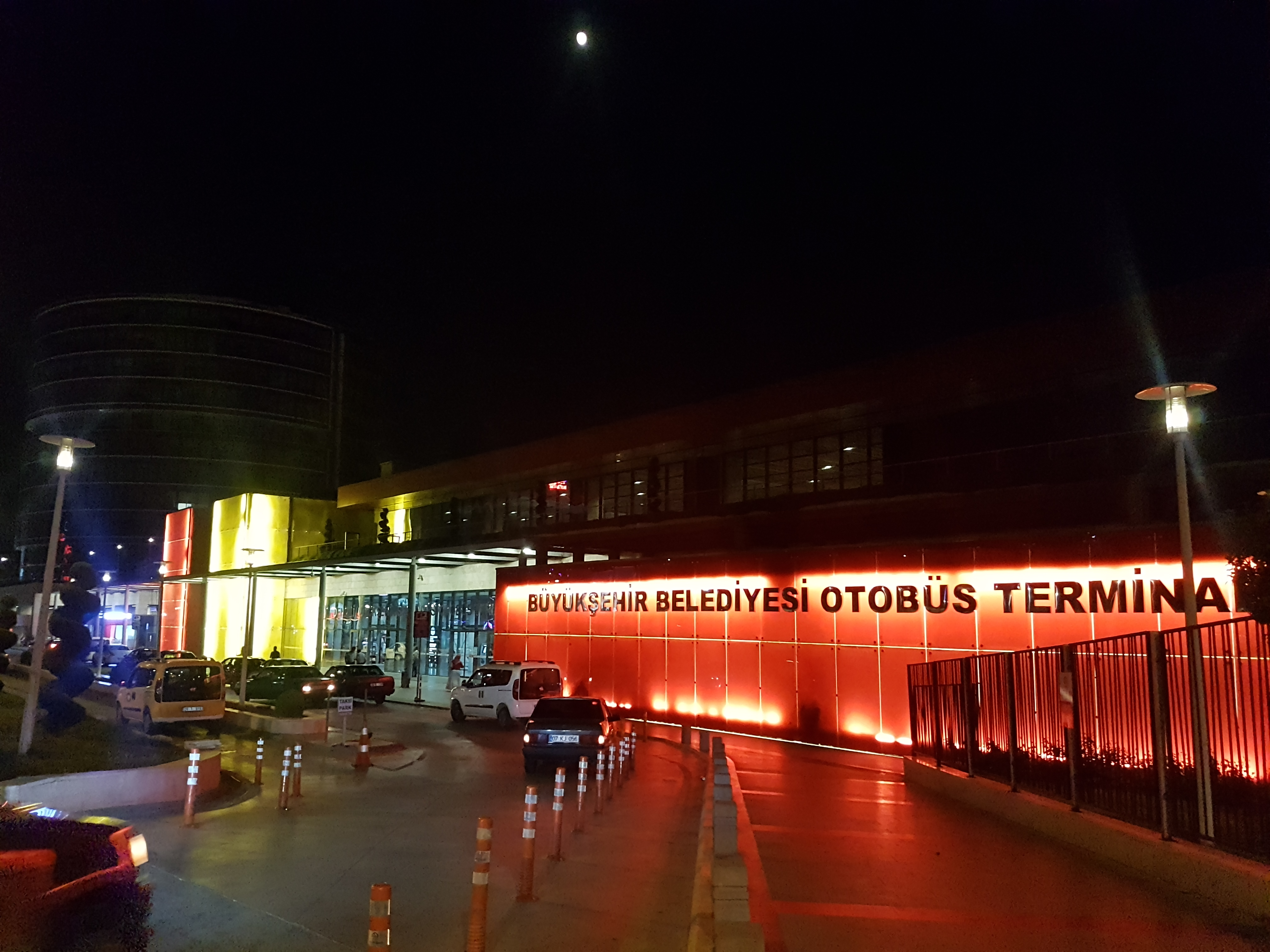

General information
- Location: Topraklık, Pamukkale, Denizli; Turkey
- Coordinates: 37°47′06.9″N 29°05′29.1″E
- Owner: Denizli Metropolitan Municipality
- Platforms: 33 platforms
- Connections: Denizli railway station Denizli Ulaşım: 120, 121, 130, 150, 160, 170, 191, 210, 211, 220, 230, 240, 250, 251, 260, 270, 300, 301, 360, 420, 440, 530, 800, 801

Construction
- Parking: 700 vehicles
- Accessible: Yes

Other information
- Status: Operational
- Website: www.denizli.bel.tr

History
- Opened: 9 March 2014; 12 years ago
Location

Denizli Bus Terminal (Turkish: Denizli Şehirlerarası Otobüs Terminali) is the intercity bus terminal of Denizli, Turkey. It was demolished in 2011, rebuilt in 2014 and reopened on March 9, 2014. During the period from 2011 to 2014, EGS Park, located approximately 6 kilometers away from the city center, was temporarily used as the terminal service. The terminal has 33 platforms for buses. It is located on the same boulevard as Denizli railway station.

== Bus connections ==
Denizli Ulaşım

- 120 - Karşıyaka - Valilik - Kervansaray
- 121 - Karşıyaka - Valilik - Çınar
- 130 - Teleferik - Çınar
- 150 - Otogar - Ulus Cad. - Kampüs
- 160 - 3.Sanayi - Kayıhan
- 170 - Otogar - Sokak Hayvanları Kliniği
- 191 - Otogar - Cankurtaran
- 210 - Valilik - Pınarkent
- 211 - Valilik - Güzelköy Kavşağı
- 220 - Toki - Çınar - Aktepe
- 230 - Otogar - Pamukkale
- 240 - Otogar - Kale - Kocadere
- 250 - Eskihisar - Çamlık - Kampüs
- 251 - Eskihisar - Lise
- 260 - Otogar - Bozburun - Salihağa
- 270 - Valilik - Irlıganlı - Eldenizli
- 300 - Karahasanlı - Üniversite - Bağbaşı
- 301 - Karahasanlı - Hal Kavş. - Çınar
- 360 - Otogar - Lise-Babadağ Toki
- 420 - Otogar - Üzerlik - Aşağışamlı
- 440 - Valilik-Gümüşler - Servergazi Hast.
- 530 - Otogar - Yenişehir
- 800 - Otogar - Çınar - Akkonak
- 801 - Otogar - Hastane - Gezekyatağı
