= Atatürk, Söke =

Village in Turkey

Atatürk
- Neighbourhood
- Location in Turkey Atatürk (Turkey Aegean)
- Coordinates: 37°45′37″N 27°24′57″E
- Country: Turkey
- Province: Aydın
- District: Söke
- Population (2024): 11,589
- Time zone: UTC+3 (TRT)

Atatürk is a neighbourhood in the municipality and district of Söke, Aydın Province, Turkey. Its population is 11,589 (2024).
