= Arslanyaylası, Söke =

Arslanyaylası
- Neighbourhood
- Location in Turkey Arslanyaylası (Turkey Aegean)
- Coordinates: 37°41′N 27°34′E
- Country: Turkey
- Province: Aydın
- District: Söke
- Population (2022): 127
- Time zone: UTC+3 (TRT)

Arslanyaylası is a neighbourhood in the municipality and district of Söke, Aydın Province, Turkey. Its population is 127 (2022).
