= Avcılar, Söke =

Avcılar
- Neighbourhood
- Location in Turkey Avcılar (Turkey Aegean)
- Coordinates: 37.6884°N 27.5996°E
- Country: Turkey
- Province: Aydın
- District: Söke
- Population (2022): 206
- Time zone: UTC+3 (TRT)

Avcılar is a neighbourhood in the municipality and district of Söke, Aydın Province, Turkey. Its population is 206 (2022).
