= Karacahayıt, Söke =

Karacahayıt
- Neighbourhood
- Location in Turkey Karacahayıt (Turkey Aegean)
- Coordinates: 37°36′N 27°29′E
- Country: Turkey
- Province: Aydın
- District: Söke
- Population (2022): 558
- Time zone: UTC+3 (TRT)

Karacahayıt is a neighbourhood in the municipality and district of Söke, Aydın Province, Turkey. Its population is 558 (2022).
