= Çalışlı, Söke =

Çalışlı
- Neighbourhood
- Location in Turkey Çalışlı (Turkey Aegean)
- Coordinates: 37°42′36″N 27°34′12″E
- Country: Turkey
- Province: Aydın
- District: Söke
- Population (2022): 728
- Time zone: UTC+3 (TRT)

Çalışlı is a neighbourhood in the municipality and district of Söke, Aydın Province, Turkey. Its population is 728 (2022).
