= Bayırdamı, Söke =

Bayırdamı
- Neighbourhood
- Location in Turkey Bayırdamı (Turkey Aegean)
- Coordinates: 37°40′N 27°34′E
- Country: Turkey
- Province: Aydın
- District: Söke
- Population (2022): 66
- Time zone: UTC+3 (TRT)

Bayırdamı is a neighbourhood in the municipality and district of Söke, Aydın Province, Turkey. Its population is 66 (2022).
