= Kaygıllı, Söke =

Kaygıllı
- Neighbourhood
- Location in Turkey Kaygıllı (Turkey Aegean)
- Coordinates: 37°38′N 27°36′E
- Country: Turkey
- Province: Aydın
- District: Söke
- Population (2022): 308
- Time zone: UTC+3 (TRT)

Kaygıllı is a neighbourhood in the municipality and district of Söke, Aydın Province, Turkey. Its population is 308 (2022).
