= Güzeltepe, Söke =

Güzeltepe
- Neighbourhood
- Location in Turkey Güzeltepe (Turkey Aegean)
- Coordinates: 37.6317°N 27.5708°E
- Country: Turkey
- Province: Aydın
- District: Söke
- Population (2022): 152
- Time zone: UTC+3 (TRT)

Güzeltepe is a neighbourhood in the municipality and district of Söke, Aydın Province, Turkey. Its population is 152 (2022). The village is inhabited by Tahtacı.
