= Fevzipaşa, Söke =

Village in Turkey

Fevzipaşa
- Neighbourhood
- Location in Turkey Fevzipaşa (Turkey Aegean)
- Coordinates: 37°45′50″N 27°24′44″E
- Country: Turkey
- Province: Aydın
- District: Söke
- Population (2024): 7,142
- Time zone: UTC+3 (TRT)

Fevzipaşa is a neighbourhood in the municipality and district of Söke, Aydın Province, Turkey. Its population is 7,142 (2024).
