= Argavlı, Söke =

Argavlı
- Neighbourhood
- Location in Turkey Argavlı (Turkey Aegean)
- Coordinates: 37°50′N 27°30′E
- Country: Turkey
- Province: Aydın
- District: Söke
- Population (2022): 233
- Time zone: UTC+3 (TRT)

Argavlı is a neighbourhood in the municipality and district of Söke, Aydın Province, Turkey. Its population is 233 (2022).
