= Çalıköy, Söke =

Çalıköy
- Neighbourhood
- Location in Turkey Çalıköy (Turkey Aegean)
- Coordinates: 37.6167°N 27.4667°E
- Country: Turkey
- Province: Aydın
- District: Söke
- Population (2022): 151
- Time zone: UTC+3 (TRT)

Çalıköy is a neighbourhood in the municipality and district of Söke, Aydın Province, Turkey. Its population is 151 (2022).
