= Karakaya, Söke =

Karakaya
- Neighbourhood
- Location in Turkey Karakaya (Turkey Aegean)
- Coordinates: 37.5764°N 27.5644°E
- Country: Turkey
- Province: Aydın
- District: Söke
- Population (2022): 246
- Time zone: UTC+3 (TRT)

Karakaya is a neighbourhood in the municipality and district of Söke, Aydın Province, Turkey. Its population is 246 (2022).
