= Yuvaca, Söke =

Yuvaca
- Neighbourhood
- Location in Turkey Yuvaca (Turkey Aegean)
- Coordinates: 37°39′N 27°15′E
- Country: Turkey
- Province: Aydın
- District: Söke
- Population (2022): 1,463
- Time zone: UTC+3 (TRT)

Yuvaca is a neighbourhood in the municipality and district of Söke, Aydın Province, Turkey. Its population is 1,463 (2022).
