= Akçakaya, Söke =

Akçakaya
- Neighbourhood
- Location in Turkey Akçakaya (Turkey Aegean)
- Coordinates: 37.6667°N 27.5167°E
- Country: Turkey
- Province: Aydın
- District: Söke
- Population (2022): 223
- Time zone: UTC+3 (TRT)

Akçakaya is a neighbourhood in the municipality and district of Söke, Aydın Province, Turkey. Its population is 223 (2022).
