= Yenicami, Söke =

Village in Turkey

Yenicami
- Neighbourhood
- Location in Turkey Yenicami (Turkey Aegean)
- Coordinates: 37°45′08″N 27°24′48″E
- Country: Turkey
- Province: Aydın
- District: Söke
- Population (2024): 15,494
- Time zone: UTC+3 (TRT)

Yenicami is a neighbourhood in the municipality and district of Söke, Aydın Province, Turkey. Its population is 15,494 (2024).
