= Yeniköy, Söke =

Yeniköy
- Neighbourhood
- Location in Turkey Yeniköy (Turkey Aegean)
- Coordinates: 37.7000°N 27.5167°E
- Country: Turkey
- Province: Aydın
- District: Söke
- Population (2022): 572
- Time zone: UTC+3 (TRT)

Yeniköy is a neighbourhood in the municipality and district of Söke, Aydın Province, Turkey. Its population is 572 (2022).
