= Yenikent, Söke =

Village in Turkey

Yenikent
- Neighbourhood
- Location in Turkey Yenikent (Turkey Aegean)
- Coordinates: 37°45′53″N 27°23′31″E
- Country: Turkey
- Province: Aydın
- District: Söke
- Population (2024): 11,309
- Time zone: UTC+3 (TRT)

Yenikent is a neighbourhood in the municipality and district of Söke, Aydın Province, Turkey. Its population is 11,309 (2024).
