= Pamukçular, Söke =

Pamukçular
- Neighbourhood
- Country: Turkey
- Province: Aydın
- District: Söke
- Population (2022): 107
- Time zone: UTC+3 (TRT)

Pamukçular is a neighbourhood in the municipality and district of Söke, Aydın Province, Turkey. Its population is 107 (2022).
