= Bağarası, Söke =

Bağarası
- Neighbourhood
- Location in Turkey Bağarası (Turkey Aegean)
- Coordinates: 37°42′N 27°33′E
- Country: Turkey
- Province: Aydın
- District: Söke
- Elevation: 20 m (66 ft)
- Population (2022): 5,728
- Time zone: UTC+3 (TRT)
- Postal code: 09200
- Area code: 0256

Bağarası is a neighbourhood of the municipality and district of Söke, Aydın Province, Turkey. Its population is 5,728 (2022). Before the 2013 reorganisation, it was a town (belde). It is 15 kilometres (9.3 mi) east of Söke and 35 kilometres (22 mi) west of Aydın.

The town was a Greek town named Mandıca prior to Turkish War of Independence. After the war according to Population exchange between Greece and Turkey agreement, the Greek population of the town was replaced with Turks from Greece. Main crops of the town are citrus, sunflower and cotton.
