= Sofular, Söke =

Sofular
- Neighbourhood
- Country: Turkey
- Province: Aydın
- District: Söke
- Population (2022): 175
- Time zone: UTC+3 (TRT)

Sofular is a neighbourhood in the municipality and district of Söke, Aydın Province, Turkey. Its population is 175 (2022).
