= Gölbent, Söke =

Gölbent
- Neighbourhood
- Location in Turkey Gölbent (Turkey Aegean)
- Coordinates: 37.671°N 27.362°E
- Country: Turkey
- Province: Aydın
- District: Söke
- Population (2022): 217
- Time zone: UTC+3 (TRT)

Gölbent is a neighborhood in the municipality and district of Söke, Aydın Province, Turkey. Its population is 217 (2022).
