= Çeltikçi, Söke =

Village in Turkey

Çeltikçi
- Neighbourhood
- Location in Turkey Çeltikçi (Turkey Aegean)
- Coordinates: 37°44′47″N 27°24′09″E
- Country: Turkey
- Province: Aydın
- District: Söke
- Population (2024): 13,497
- Time zone: UTC+3 (TRT)

Çeltikçi is a neighbourhood in the municipality and district of Söke, Aydın Province, Turkey. Its population is 13,497 (2024).
