= Özbaşı, Söke =

Özbaşı
- Neighbourhood
- Location in Turkey Özbaşı (Turkey Aegean)
- Coordinates: 37.6283°N 27.4278°E
- Country: Turkey
- Province: Aydın
- District: Söke
- Population (2022): 353
- Time zone: UTC+3 (TRT)

Özbaşı is a neighbourhood in the municipality and district of Söke, Aydın Province, Turkey. Its population is 353 (2022).
