= Güneyyaka, Söke =

Güneyyaka
- Neighbourhood
- Country: Turkey
- Province: Aydın
- District: Söke
- Population (2022): 64
- Time zone: UTC+3 (TRT)

Güneyyaka is a neighbourhood in the municipality and district of Söke, Aydın Province, Turkey. Its population is 64 (2022). The village is inhabited by Tahtacı.
