= Kisir, Söke =

Kisir
- Neighbourhood
- Location in Turkey Kisir (Turkey Aegean)
- Coordinates: 37.6167°N 27.5500°E
- Country: Turkey
- Province: Aydın
- District: Söke
- Population (2022): 279
- Time zone: UTC+3 (TRT)

Kisir is a neighbourhood in the municipality and district of Söke, Aydın Province, Turkey. Its population is 279 (2022).
