= Akçakonak, Söke =

Akçakonak
- Neighbourhood
- Location in Turkey Akçakonak (Turkey Aegean)
- Coordinates: 37.7000°N 27.3667°E
- Country: Turkey
- Province: Aydın
- District: Söke
- Population (2022): 1,814
- Time zone: UTC+3 (TRT)

Akçakonak is a neighbourhood in the municipality and district of Söke, Aydın Province, Turkey. Its population is 1,814 (2022).
