= Karaatlı, Söke =

Karaatlı
- Neighbourhood
- Location in Turkey Karaatlı (Turkey Aegean)
- Coordinates: 37.7500°N 27.5333°E
- Country: Turkey
- Province: Aydın
- District: Söke
- Population (2022): 64
- Time zone: UTC+3 (TRT)

Karaatlı is a neighbourhood in the municipality and district of Söke, Aydın Province, Turkey. Its population is 64 (2022).
