= Avşar, Söke =

Avşar
- Neighbourhood
- Location in Turkey Avşar (Turkey Aegean)
- Coordinates: 37.5797°N 27.4250°E
- Country: Turkey
- Province: Aydın
- District: Söke
- Population (2022): 381
- Time zone: UTC+3 (TRT)

Avşar is a neighbourhood in the municipality and district of Söke, Aydın Province, Turkey. Its population is 381 (2022).
