= Serçin, Söke =

Serçin
- Neighbourhood
- Location in Turkey Serçin (Turkey Aegean)
- Coordinates: 37°32′N 27°23′E
- Country: Turkey
- Province: Aydın
- District: Söke
- Population (2022): 648
- Time zone: UTC+3 (TRT)

Serçin is a neighbourhood in the municipality and district of Söke, Aydın Province, Turkey. Its population is 648 (2022).
