= Savuca =

- Neighbourhood
- Location in Turkey Savuca (Turkey Aegean)
- Coordinates: 37°44′N 27°24′E
- Country: Turkey
- Province: Aydın
- District: Söke
- Elevation: 70 m (230 ft)
- Population (2022): 7,414
- Time zone: UTC+3 (TRT)
- Postal code: 09200
- Area code: 0256

Savuca is a neighbourhood of the municipality and district of Söke, Aydın Province, Turkey. Its population is 7,414 (2022). Before the 2013 reorganisation, it was a town (belde).

It is situated in the fertile plains and to the west of Büyükmenderes River (Maeander of the antiquity), it is almost merged to Söke. Savuca was founded during Ottoman Empire era. The number of houses were 18 in 1473 and 87 in 1529. In 1800s during a plague epidemic the settlement was almost emptied and the name of the settlement may refer to that event (Savuş means "escape") Later Circassian refugees from the Caucasus were also settled in Savuca. In 1992 the settlement was declared a seat of township. Main economic activity of the town is cotton farming. Being close to district center, some people work in Söke.
