= Tuzburgazı, Söke =

Tuzburgazı
- Neighbourhood
- Location in Turkey Tuzburgazı (Turkey Aegean)
- Coordinates: 37°37′N 27°13′E
- Country: Turkey
- Province: Aydın
- District: Söke
- Population (2022): 725
- Time zone: UTC+3 (TRT)

Tuzburgazı is a neighbourhood in the municipality and district of Söke, Aydın Province, Turkey. Its population is 725 (2022).
