= Cumhuriyet, Söke =

Village in Turkey

Cumhuriyet
- Neighbourhood
- Location in Turkey Cumhuriyet (Turkey Aegean)
- Coordinates: 37°44′29″N 27°24′24″E
- Country: Turkey
- Province: Aydın
- District: Söke
- Population (2024): 7,502
- Time zone: UTC+3 (TRT)

Cumhuriyet is a neighbourhood in the municipality and district of Söke, Aydın Province, Turkey. Its population is 7,502 (2024).
