= Atburgazı, Söke =

Atburgazı
- Neighbourhood
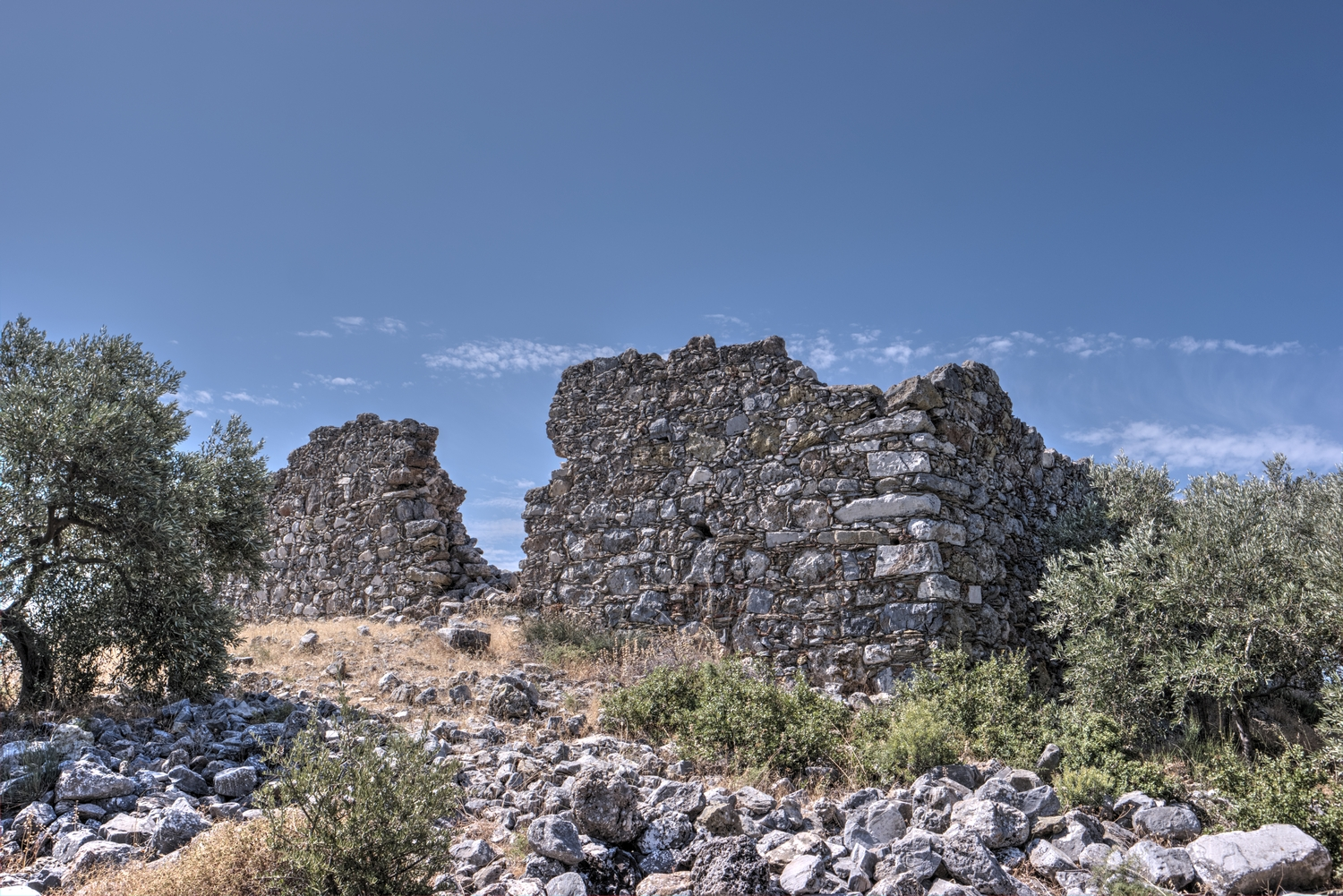
- Asartepe Castle in Atburgazı

- Location within Turkey Location within Turkey Aegean
- Coordinates: 37°38′N 27°15′E
- Country: Turkey
- Province: Aydın
- District: Söke
- Population (2022): 1,827
- Time zone: UTC+3 (TRT)

Atburgazı is a neighbourhood of the municipality and district of Söke, Aydın Province, Turkey. Its population is 1,827 (2022). Before the 2013 reorganisation, it was a town (belde). The village is inhabited by Tahtacı.
