= Konak, Söke =

Village in Turkey

Konak
- Neighbourhood
- Location in Turkey Konak (Turkey Aegean)
- Coordinates: 37°45′18″N 27°24′14″E
- Country: Turkey
- Province: Aydın
- District: Söke
- Population (2024): 11,613
- Time zone: UTC+3 (TRT)

Konak is a neighbourhood in the municipality and district of Söke, Aydın Province, Turkey. Its population is 11,613 (2024).
