= Demirçay, Söke =

Demirçay
- Neighbourhood
- Location in Turkey Demirçay (Turkey Aegean)
- Coordinates: 37°39′N 27°38′E
- Country: Turkey
- Province: Aydın
- District: Söke
- Population (2022): 231
- Time zone: UTC+3 (TRT)

Demirçay is a neighbourhood in the municipality and district of Söke, Aydın Province, Turkey. Its population is 231 (2022).
