= Yenidoğan, Söke =

Yenidoğan
- Neighbourhood
- Location in Turkey Yenidoğan (Turkey Aegean)
- Coordinates: 37°43′19″N 27°23′24″E
- Country: Turkey
- Province: Aydın
- District: Söke
- Population (2022): 4,904
- Time zone: UTC+3 (TRT)

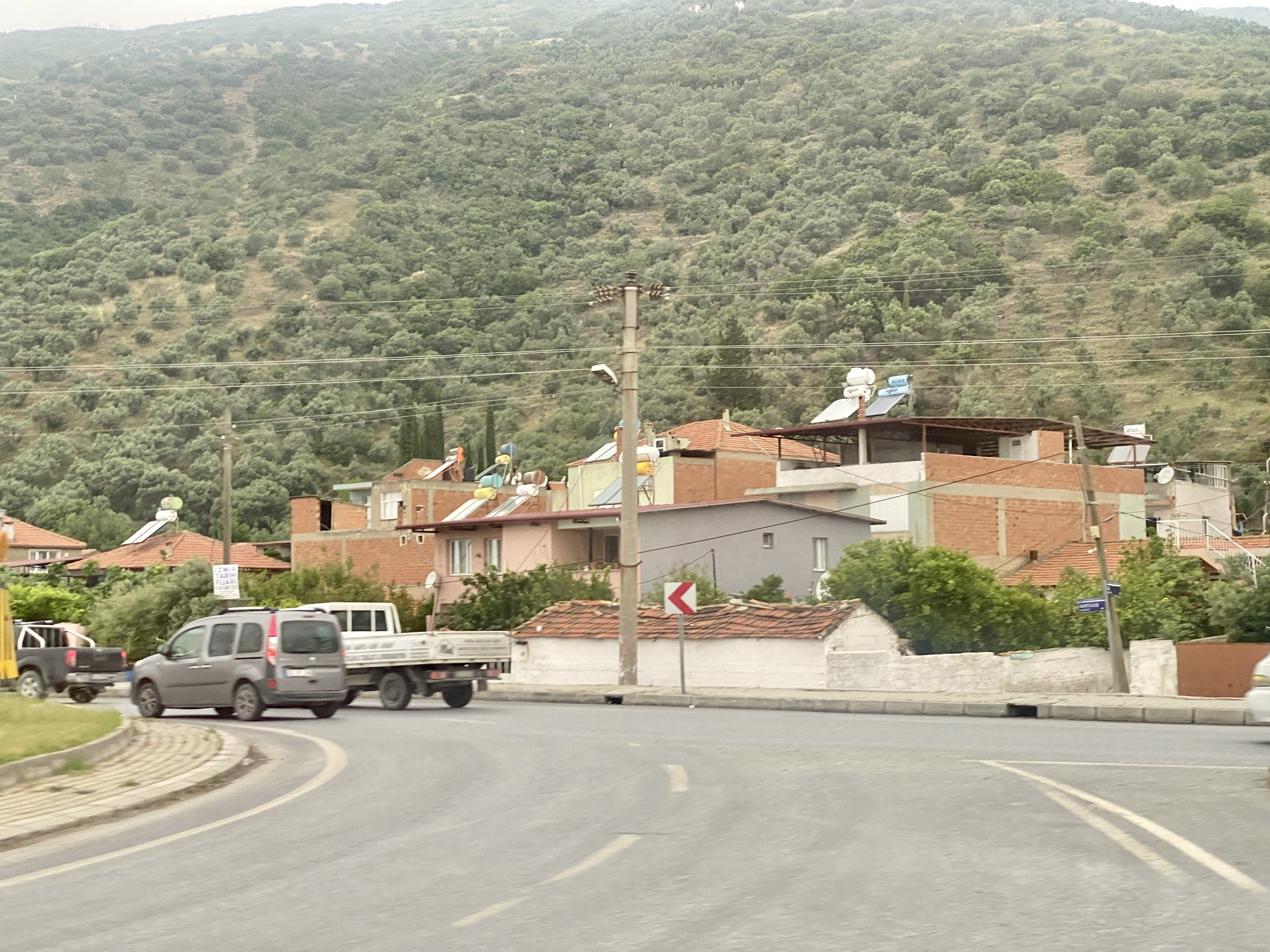
Yenidoğan, Söke

Yenidoğan is a neighbourhood of the municipality and district of Söke, Aydın Province, Turkey. Its population is 4,904 (2022). Before the 2013 reorganisation, it was a town (belde).
