= Burunköy, Söke =

Burunköy
- Neighbourhood
- Location in Turkey Burunköy (Turkey Aegean)
- Coordinates: 37.7000°N 27.5000°E
- Country: Turkey
- Province: Aydın
- District: Söke
- Population (2022): 684
- Time zone: UTC+3 (TRT)

Burunköy is a neighbourhood in the municipality and district of Söke, Aydın Province, Turkey. Its population is 684 (2022).
