= Nalbantlar, Söke =

Nalbantlar
- Neighbourhood
- Location in Turkey Nalbantlar (Turkey Aegean)
- Coordinates: 37°37′N 27°30′E
- Country: Turkey
- Province: Aydın
- District: Söke
- Population (2022): 200
- Time zone: UTC+3 (TRT)

Nalbantlar is a neighbourhood in the municipality and district of Söke, Aydın Province, Turkey. Its population is 200 (2022).
