= Sazlı, Söke =

Sazlı
- Neighbourhood
- Location in Turkey Sazlı (Turkey Aegean)
- Coordinates: 37.7842°N 27.4653°E
- Country: Turkey
- Province: Aydın
- District: Söke
- Population (2022): 4,695
- Time zone: UTC+3 (TRT)

Sazlı (formerly: Sazlıköy) is a neighbourhood of the municipality and district of Söke, Aydın Province, Turkey. Its population is 4,695 (2022). Before the 2013 reorganisation, it was a town (belde).
