= Pamukova YHT railway station =

PAMUKOVA YHT

General information
- Coordinates: 40.4982°N 30.1872°E
- System: TCDD high-speed rail station currently under construction
- Owner: Turkish State Railways
- Line: Yüksek Hızlı Tren
- Platforms: 2
- Tracks: 4

Construction
- Structure type: At-Grade
- Parking: Yes
- Accessible: Yes
Location

Pamukova YHT station is railway station, currently under construction, on the Istanbul-Ankara high-speed railway just south of Pamukova, Turkey. The station was originally expected to open in 2015, but due to political instability between the June and November 2015 Turkish presidential elections, the opening date has been pushed back. As of 2016 the tracks are complete, but construction on the station itself hasn't begun.
