= Nusaybin railway station =

Railway station in Nusaybin, Turkey

Nusaybin

General information
- Coordinates: 37.07606°N 41.22973°E
- Owner: TCDD
- Platforms: 1
- Tracks: 6

Construction
- Structure type: At-grade

History
- Opened: 25 October 1918
Location

Nusaybin station is a railway station in the town of Nusaybin in Turkey next to the Turkey–Syria border. The station is the easternmost station in Turkey on the Baghdad Railway. The station was opened on 25 October 1918 by the Baghdad Railway. The station has no passenger service.
