= Doğanbey, Söke =

Doğanbey
- Neighbourhood
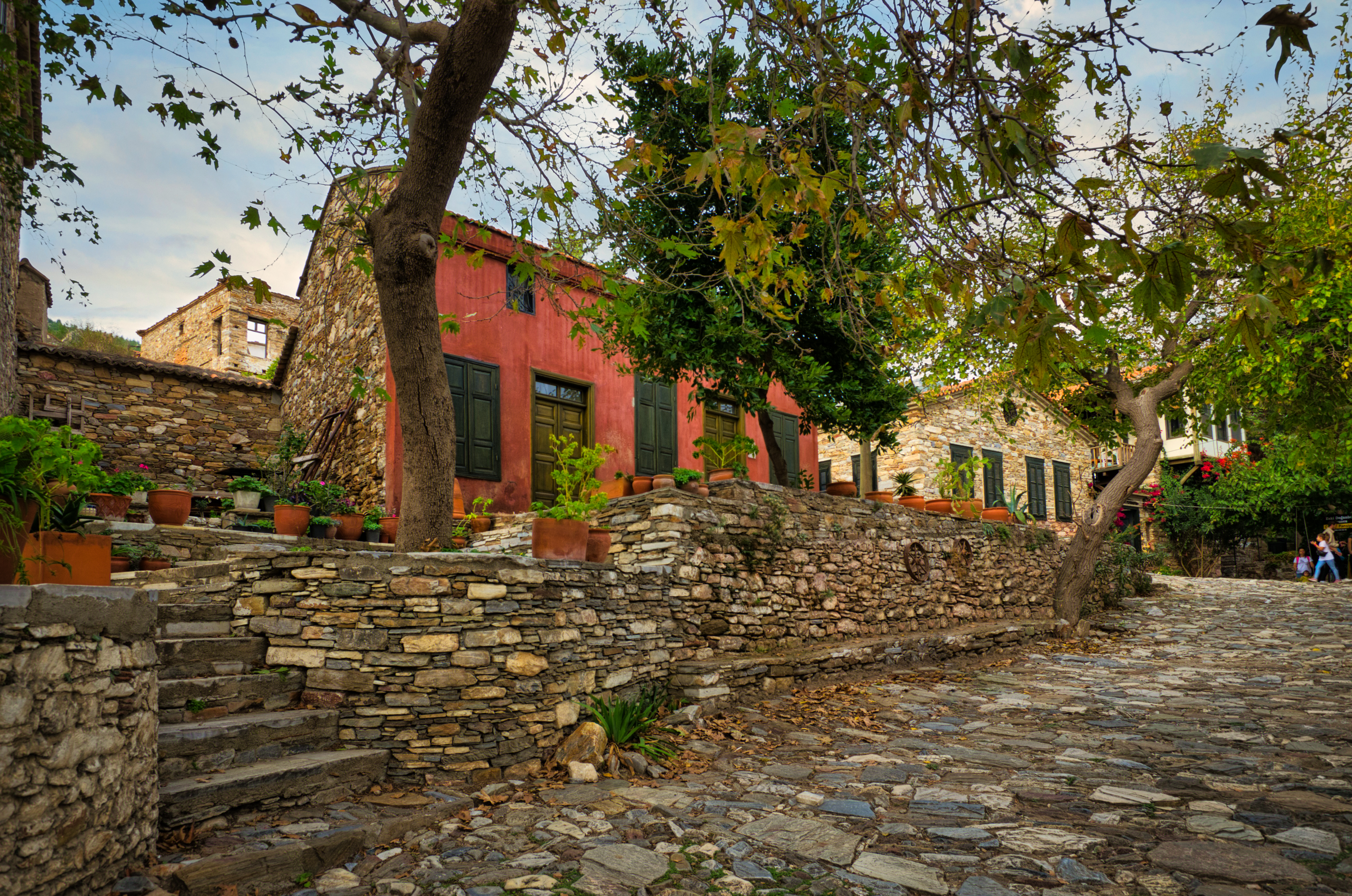
- Stone houses in Doğanbey

- Location within Turkey Location within Turkey Aegean
- Coordinates: 37°37′07″N 27°10′51″E
- Country: Turkey
- Province: Aydın
- District: Söke
- Population (2022): 655
- Time zone: UTC+3 (TRT)

Doğanbey is a neighbourhood in the municipality and district of Söke, Aydın Province, Turkey. Its population is 655 (2022).
