= Mardin railway station =

Railway station in Artuklu, Turkey

Mardin

General information
- Owner: TCDD
- Platforms: 1
- Tracks: 5

History
- Opened: 1918
Location

Mardin station (Turkish: Mardin Garı) is a railway station in Mardin on the Mardin-Senyurt Railway Line. The station is located 4.9 km (3.0 mi) away from Mardin.
