= Çavdar, Söke =

Çavdar
- Neighbourhood
- Location in Turkey Çavdar (Turkey Aegean)
- Coordinates: 37.5975°N 27.6428°E
- Country: Turkey
- Province: Aydın
- District: Söke
- Population (2022): 954
- Time zone: UTC+3 (TRT)

Çavdar is a neighbourhood in the municipality and district of Söke, Aydın Province, Turkey. Its population is 954 (2022).
