= İzmir–Söke Regional =

Basmane-Söke Regional
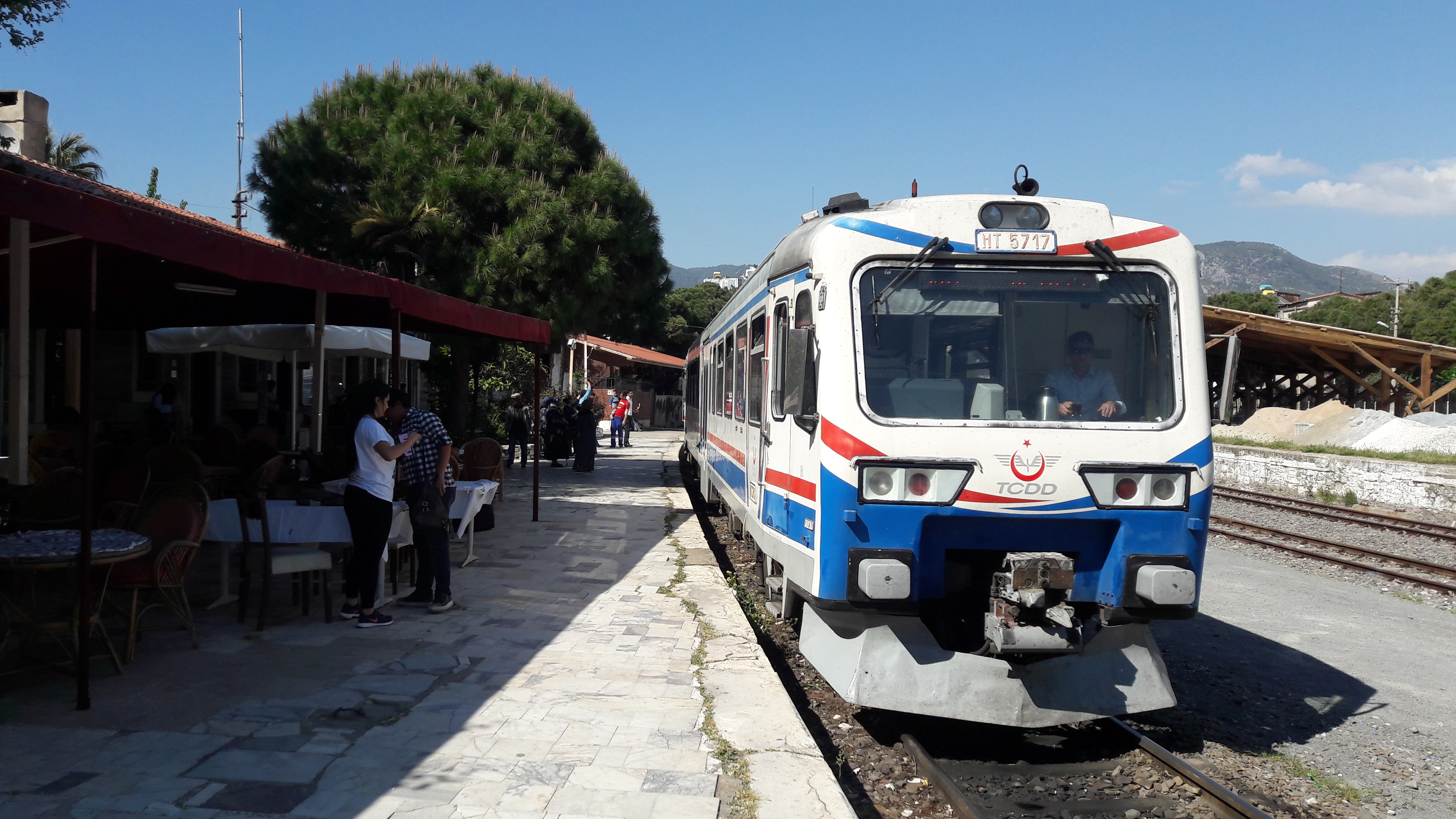
- A southbound train having just arrived at Söke.

Overview
- Service type: Regional rail
- Status: Closed
- Locale: Western Anatolia
- Current operator: TCDD Taşımacılık
- Former operator: TCDD

Route
- Termini: Basmane Terminal, İzmir; Söke
- Stops: 12
- Distance travelled: 121 km (75 mi)
- Average journey time: 2 hours, 28 minutes
- Service frequency: Daily
- Train number: 32351, 32352

On-board services
- Classes: Unreserved, unnumbered, classless
- Disabled access: Limited
- Seating arrangements: Coach seating
- Catering facilities: No

Technical
- Rolling stock: 3xTCDD MT5700
- Track gauge: 1,435 mm (4 ft 8 1/2 in)
- Electrification: No
- Track owner: Turkish State Railways

The Basmane–Söke Regional, numbered B39 (Turkish: Basmane-Söke Bölgeseli), was a 121 km (75 mi) long regional passenger train operated by the Turkish State Railways, running from Basmane Terminal in İzmir to the town of Söke. The train was operating daily in each direction, heading to İzmir in the morning and returning to Söke in the evening. Scheduled journey time is 2 hours and 28 minutes.

The northbound train was departing Söke at 5:55 while the southbound train was departing Basmane Terminal at 19:25.
