= Söke railway station =

Söke
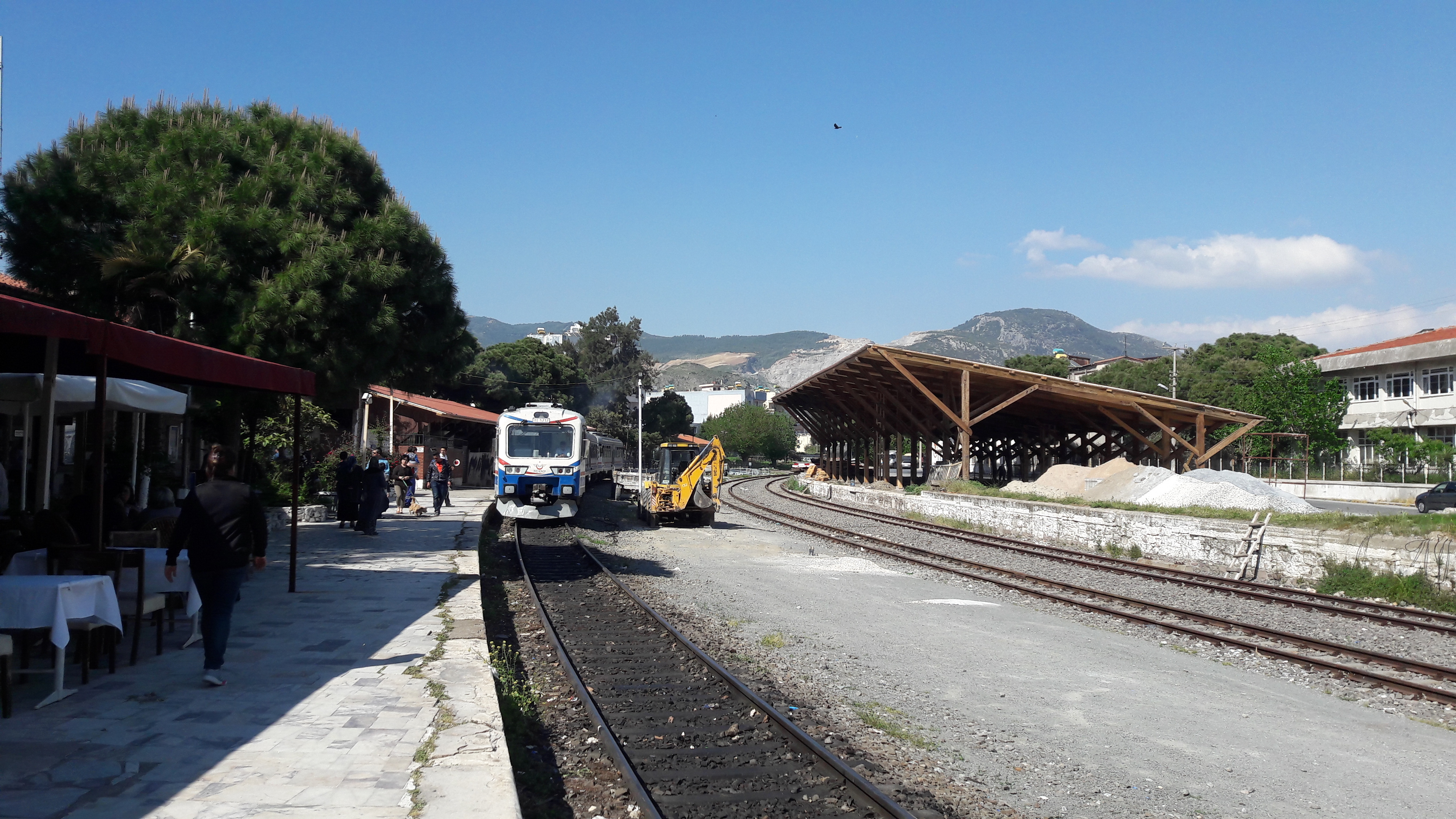
- Denizli-bound regional train #32745 departing the station

General information
- Location: Abdi İpekçi Cd. No:2, Söke, Aydın 09200
- Coordinates: 37.7552°N 27.4096°E
- System: TCDD regional rail station
- Owner: TCDD
- Line: İzmir–Söke Söke–Nazilli Söke–Denizli
- Platforms: 1
- Tracks: 1

Construction
- Structure type: At-grade
- Parking: Yes

Other information
- Status: In Operation

History
- Opened: 1 December 1890

Services
Preceding station	TCDD Taşımacılık	Following station
Sazlıköy towards İzmir (Basmane)	İzmir–Söke	Terminus
Terminus	Söke–Denizli	Sazlıköy towards Denizli
Terminus	Söke–Nazilli	Sazlıköy towards Nazilli
Location

Söke station is a railway station in Söke, Turkey and the southern terminus of the Ortaklar–Söke railway. It is serviced by three daily regional trains to Basmane Terminal in İzmir, Nazilli and Denizli respectively. The station was opened on 1 December 1890 by the Ottoman Railway Company.
