= Denizli railway station =

Railway station in Denizli, Turkey

DENİZLİ
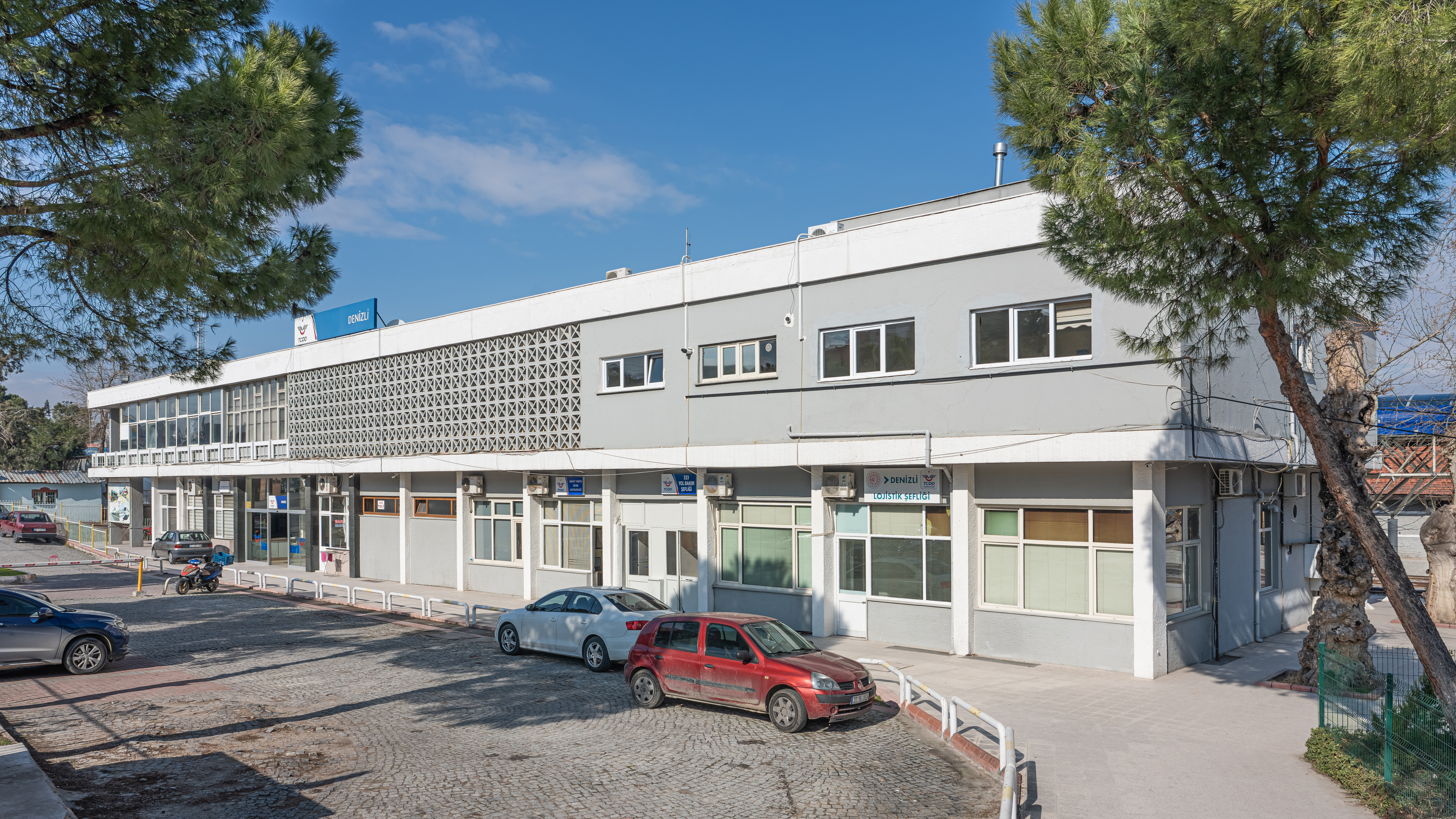

General information
- Location: İzmir Blv. 47, Topraklık Mah. 20150, Denizli, Turkey
- Coordinates: 37.7869°N 29.0909°E
- System: TCDD inter-city and regional rail station
- Owner: Turkish State Railways
- Line: İzmir-Eğirdir railway (Denizli branch)
- Platforms: 1
- Tracks: 2
- Connections: Denizli Bus Terminal; Denizli Ulaşım: 120, 121, 130, 150, 160, 170, 191, 210, 211, 220, 230, 240, 250, 251, 260, 270, 300, 301, 360, 420, 440, 530, 800, 801

Construction
- Structure type: At-grade

Other information
- Status: In Operation

History
- Opened: 13 October 1889
- Rebuilt: 2013

Services
Preceding station	TCDD Taşımacılık	Following station
Goncalı towards Eskişehir	Pamukkale Express	Terminus
Goncalı towards İzmir (Basmane)	İzmir–Denizli	Terminus
Goncalı towards Söke	Söke–Denizli	Terminus
Location

Denizli station is the main railway station in Denizli, Turkey. The Turkish State Railways operates three train services to Denizli; the daily Pamukkale Express to Eskişehir, the Basmane-Denizli Regional to İzmir with six daily trains and the daily Söke-Denizli Regional to Söke. It is located on the same street with Denizli Bus Terminal.

Denizli station is on the southern end of the short 9.3 km (5.8 mi) Goncalı-Denizli railway, which connects the city to the İzmir–Eğirdir railway.

== Bus connections ==
Denizli Ulaşım

- 120 - Karşıyaka - Valilik - Kervansaray
- 121 - Karşıyaka - Valilik - Çınar
- 130 - Teleferik - Çınar
- 150 - Otogar - Ulus Cad. - Kampüs
- 160 - 3.Sanayi - Kayıhan
- 170 - Otogar - Sokak Hayvanları Kliniği
- 191 - Otogar - Cankurtaran
- 210 - Valilik - Pınarkent
- 211 - Valilik - Güzelköy Kavşağı
- 220 - Toki - Çınar - Aktepe
- 230 - Otogar - Pamukkale
- 240 - Otogar - Kale - Kocadere
- 250 - Eskihisar - Çamlık - Kampüs
- 251 - Eskihisar - Lise
- 260 - Otogar - Bozburun - Salihağa
- 270 - Valilik - Irlıganlı - Eldenizli
- 300 - Karahasanlı - Üniversite - Bağbaşı
- 301 - Karahasanlı - Hal Kavş. - Çınar
- 360 - Otogar - Lise-Babadağ Toki
- 420 - Otogar - Üzerlik - Aşağışamlı
- 440 - Valilik-Gümüşler - Servergazi Hast.
- 530 - Otogar - Yenişehir
- 800 - Otogar - Çınar - Akkonak
- 801 - Otogar - Hastane - Gezekyatağı
