= Söke =

- District and municipality
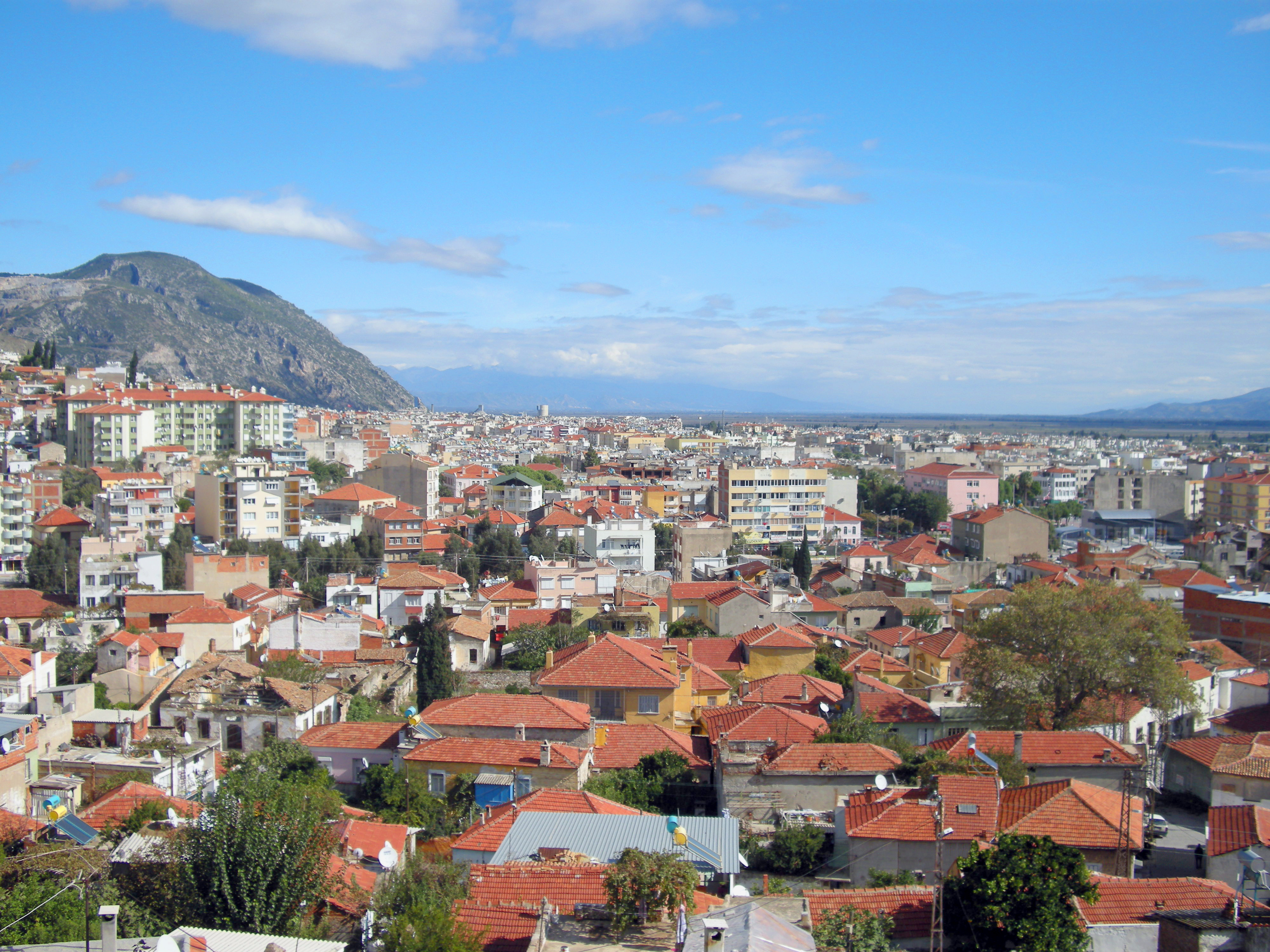
- A general view of Söke

- Logo

- Map showing Söke District in Aydın Province

- Location within Turkey Location within Turkey Aegean
- Coordinates: 37°45′3″N 27°24′37″E
- Country: Turkey
- Province: Aydın

Government
  - Mayor: Mustafa İberya Arıkan (AKP)
- Area: 1,064 km^{2} (411 sq mi)
- Population (2022): 123,301
  - Density: 115.9/km^{2} (300.1/sq mi)
- Time zone: UTC+3 (TRT)
- Postal code: 09200
- Area code: 0256
- Website: www.soke.bel.tr

Söke is a municipality and district of Aydın Province, Turkey. Its area is 1,064 km^{2}, and its population is 123,301 (2022). It is the largest district of Aydın Province by area. Söke is 54 km (34 miles) south-west of the city of Aydın, near the Aegean coast. Its neighbours are Germencik from north-east, Koçarlı from east, Milas from south-east, Didim from south-west, Aegean Sea from west and Kuşadası from northwest. The mayor of Söke is Mustafa İberya Arıkan.

== Etymology ==
Modern Söke is identified with the ancient Greek city of Annaea (Ancient Greek: Ἄνναια, Ἄναια, Ἀναία) (also referred to as Anea, Anaea, Anaia or Annaia), which was named after the Amazon Anaea (Ἀναία). Later, it was also called Sokia (Greek: Σώκια). As of 1920, the British were calling it Sokia. Anaia is also the name of a titular see (Anaea) of the Catholic and Orthodox churches. From 1833 to 1922, it was the seat of the Diocese of Anea of the Ecumenical Patriarchate of Constantinople. After that date, the demographics of the population changed and Orthodox Christians declined in number in the area.

== History ==
Settled for centuries before the Common Era, the region was called Aneon (Greek: Ανέων) and was inhabited by Greeks. Stephanus of Byzantium, quoting Ephorus, mention that the tomb of the amazon Anaea was at the city. During the Peloponnesian War, some Samian exiles migrated there. In addition, Thucydides mentioned that there was a naval station, and it was near enough to annoy Samos.

In 1426 the city was captured by the Ottoman Empire under Murad II as the remaining capital of the Sanjak of Menteşe. From 1867 until 1922, Söke was part of the Aidin Vilayet of the Ottoman Empire. After the First Balkan War, many Muslim refugees from the Balkans settled around this area.

According to the 1914 Ottoman population statistics, the district of Karaburun had a total population of 36.976, consisting of 20.028 Muslims, 16.720 Greeks, 133 Armenians, and 95 Jews.

On 18 May 1919, Italian troops landed at Söke. The Allies were afraid that the Italian landing might provoke trouble with the Greek troops, who were near Smyrna. Although Italy and Greece were allies during WWI, their relations were not good.

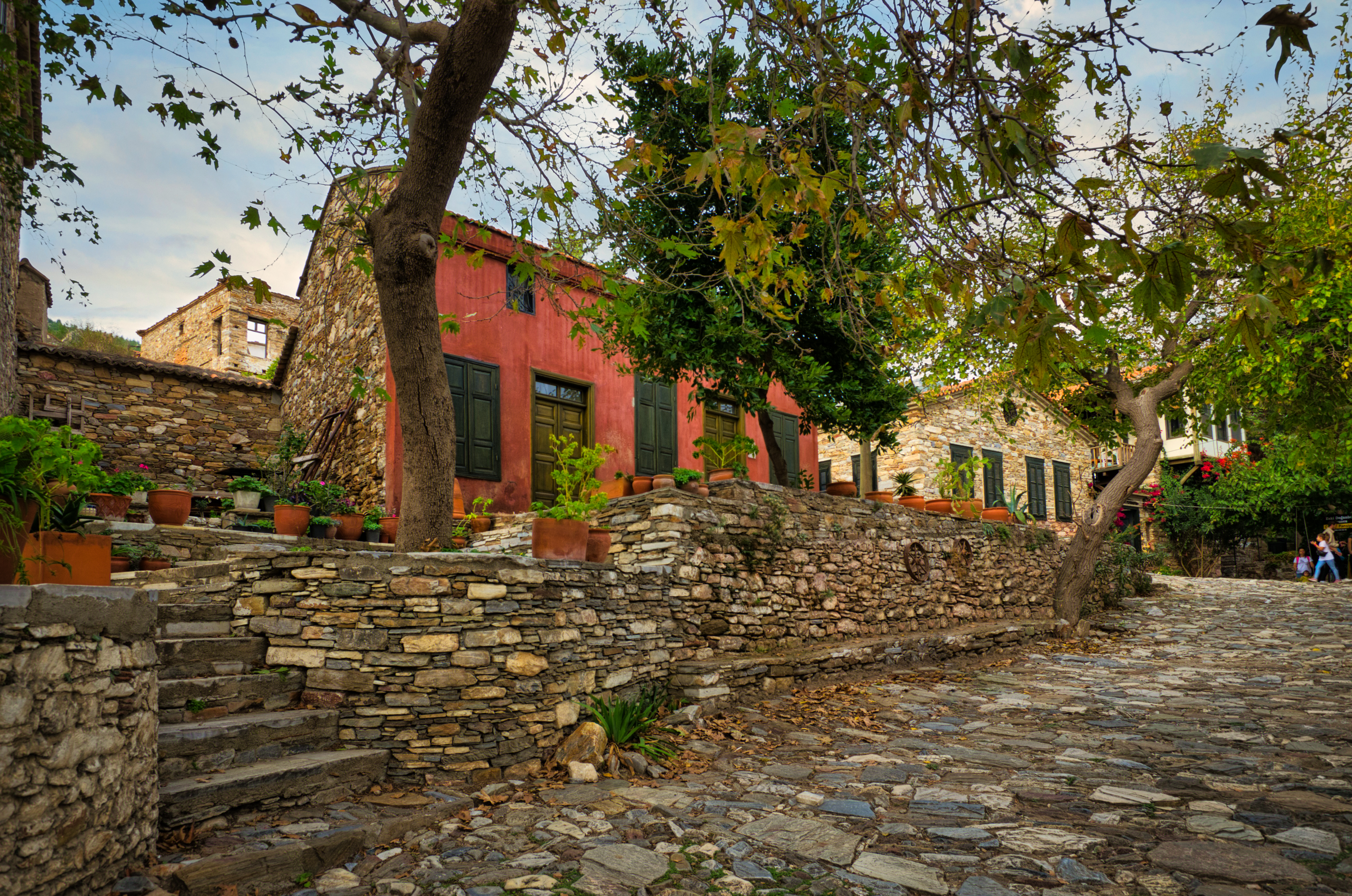
Stone houses in Doğanbey

After the end of World War I, fighting continued in a power struggle after the break-up of the Ottoman Empire. In 1920, large Turkish and Arab forces were fighting against the occupying Italian forces.

In April 1922 Italian troops were withdrawn and Greek troops entered the area. After the defeat of the Greek army in the Greco-Turkish War (1919–1922), Greek troops was withdrawn, and Turkish troops entered in September 1922. Greek inhabitants of the area evacuated to Greece together with the Greek army. The Turkish resistance in the area was led by one Cafer Efe (Djafer Efe); a statue was erected later here to commemorate him.

During the Population exchange between Greece and Turkey in the 1920s, the Greek Christian population migrated to the Greek island of Crete and the Cretan Muslims moved here.

== Geography ==
The district lies between the Aegean coast and the edge of the fertile alluvial plain of the Büyük Menderes River. Lake Bafa is to the south of the district. The plain contains much rich agricultural land; it is one of Turkey's largest cotton-growing areas and is also important for the commodities of wheat and flour. Other income comes from handicrafts, forestry, and fishing. Söke is Turkey's only exporter of culinary snails.

Söke is a large town in the centre of the Aegean region, and the market town is at the heart of an agricultural district. Although secondary to the nearby centres of tourism on the coast, Kuşadası, Didim and Bodrum, Söke does catch passing trade from the tourist visitors to the area, including visitors to the nearby historical site of Priene. There are a number of amenities on the highway for tourists passing through from İzmir airport to the coast, including restaurants, service stations, and outlet stores. The local cuisine includes çöp şiş (a shish kebab of small pieces of lamb) and pide (a flat bread pizza).

== Composition ==
There are 49 neighbourhoods in Söke District:

- Ağaçlı
- Akçakaya
- Akçakonak
- Argavlı
- Arslanyaylası
- Atatürk
- Atburgazı
- Avcılar
- Avşar
- Bağarası
- Bayırdamı
- Burunköy
- Çalıköy
- Çalışlı
- Çavdar
- Çeltikçi
- Cumhuriyet
- Demirçay
- Doğanbey
- Fevzipaşa
- Gölbent
- Güllübahçe
- Güneyyaka
- Güzeltepe
- Karaatlı
- Karacahayıt
- Karakaya
- Kaygıllı
- Kemalpaşa
- Kisir
- Konak
- Köprüalan
- Nalbantlar
- Özbaşı
- Pamukçular
- Sarıkemer
- Savuca
- Sayrakçı
- Sazlı
- Serçin
- Sofular
- Tuzburgazı
- Yamaç
- Yenicami
- Yenidoğan
- Yenikent
- Yeniköy
- Yeşilköy
- Yuvaca

== Economy ==
Söke has a history of mining lignite. During World War I, it was producing large amounts of lignite. The British described the quality as being "very poor." It was exported to Smyrna via train and used in factories.

== Places of interest ==
- Priene - ancient ruins, 15 km (9 mi) from Söke

== See also ==
- Lake Bafa
