= Yeşilyurt, Muğla =

Yeşilyurt
- Neighbourhood
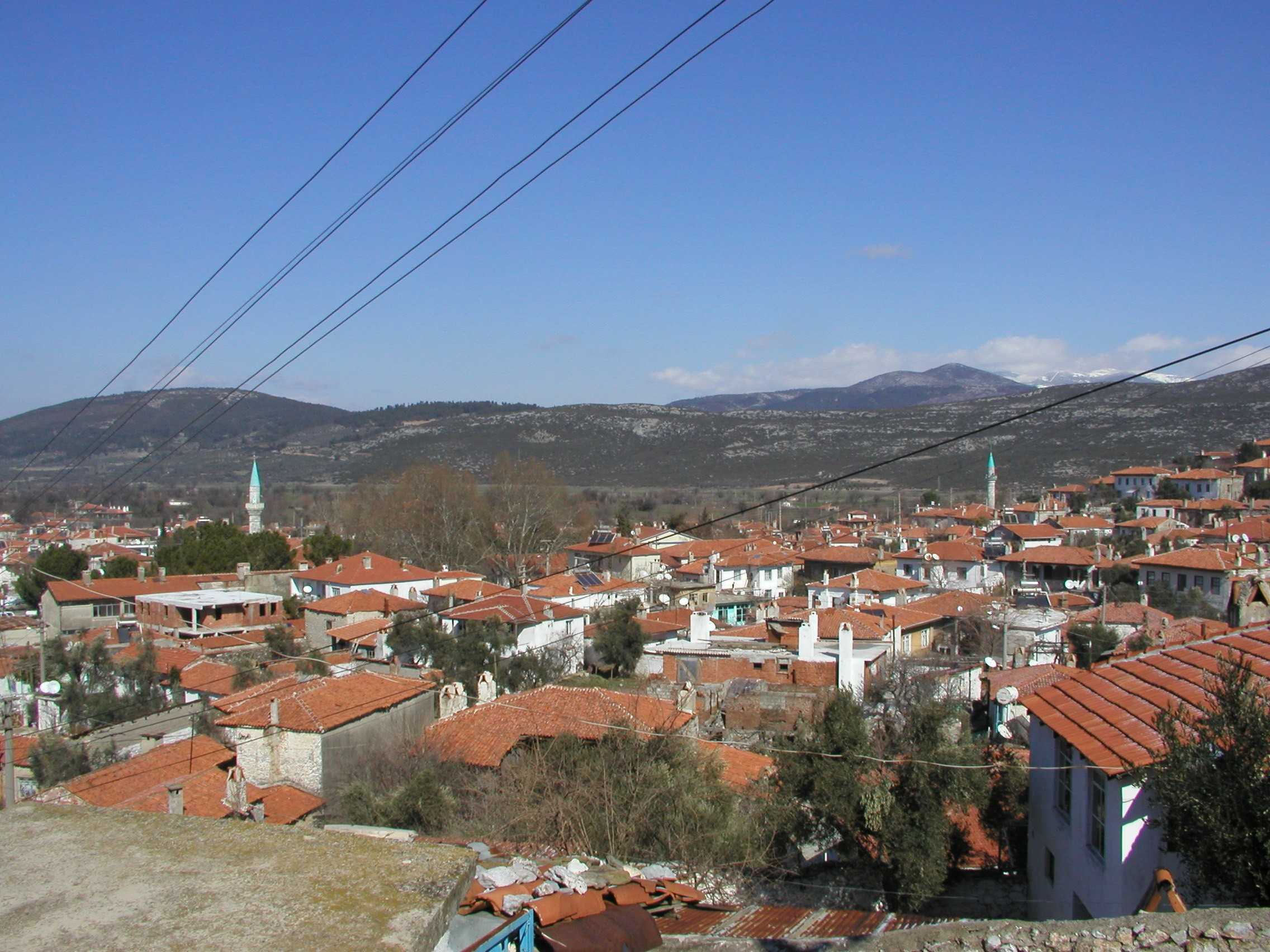

- Location within Turkey Location within Turkey Aegean
- Coordinates: 37°11′27″N 28°16′37″E
- Country: Turkey
- Province: Muğla
- District: Menteşe
- Population (2022): 2,272
- Time zone: UTC+3 (TRT)
- Postal code: 48050
- Area code: 0252

Yeşilyurt is a neighbourhood of the municipality and district of Menteşe, Muğla Province, Turkey. Its population is 2,272 (2022). Before the 2013 reorganisation, it was a town (belde). It is at a distance of 14 kilometres (8.7 mi) from the city centre of Muğla.

It is accessed by a turnout at a short distance from Muğla-İzmir highway just before entering Muğla. The town is located along slopes in the southern end of a plain of the same name.

== Etymology ==
The township's official name was Pisiköy until 1961 and this name's short form Pisi is still commonly used to refer to the settlement and its plain across the region. As such, the town had retained its historical name until recently, the name change decided by the central government in Ankara being a matter of anecdotes among the inhabitants.

The historical name Pisye is pre-Greek and may be compared with other pis- names encountered across Anatolia such as Pisidai, Pisilis and Pisa. A number of Turkish sources associate it with the toponym "Pissuwa" reportedly mentioned in Luwian or Hittite sources.

== Geography ==
Yeşilyurt plain is situated in one of the pot-shaped small plains surrounded by mountains as formed by depressions in the Neogene (the other similar formations in the immediate neighborhood are the Muğla, Gülağzı, Yerkesik, Akkaya, Yenice, Çamköy and Ula plains).

Among these, Yeşilyurt plain, as well as Çamköy and Ula plains, ceased to be fully hermetical in time, and with a smaller depression opening a passage in its north, Yeşilyurt plain acquired the characteristics of fluvio-karst formations, becoming the starting point of the Çineçay (Marsyas) that joins the Menderes river 100 kilometres (62 mi) farther north near Aydın.

Since, according to Greek mythology, Marsyas River stems from the blood of the satyr of the same name, punished by Apollo by being flayed and nailed to a tree for having a lost the music contest between the two, the satyr's final place of rest should be around Yeşilyurt.

Until the recent building of highways, contacts between the several plains of the inner Muğla region with either the coastal regions, or with the inland centers (through one of the three difficult passes; to the northwest to Milas, to the north to the Menderes plain through Gökbel valley following Çineçay, or to the northeast to Tavas) were quite arduous, and the region as a whole always tended to develop its peculiarities.

== Features ==
Yeşilyurt is known for its hand-made textile products woven in silk or cotton.

These traditional activities have been re-organized in the framework of a cooperative project in the 1990s by the then governor for Muğla Province, Lale Aytaman, Turkey's first female governor.

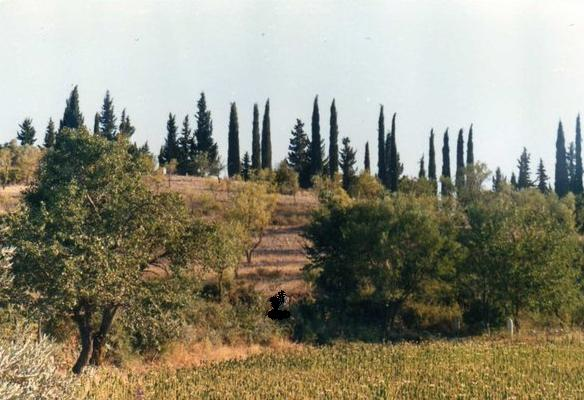
Hills around Yeşilyurt

As such, Yeşilyurt has become a regular furnisher of upmarket textile products to niche Turkish brands as Beymen and Vakko. The fabrics woven in Yeşilyurt have been used in the movies The Warrior, Harry Potter and Troy (film), through connections set up by the film costume coordinator Jeeda Barford and her Turkish husband.

The locals produce the silk, the wool and the cotton fabric themselves. Natural dyes are still extensively used. Two particularities of most of Yeşilyurt fabrics have to do with a raw material and a color. Wild cotton, providing a more yellowish taint, is widely employed. And also, a tone of reddish brown, or a brownish red, obtained naturally from erica vulgaris and called şaşkırmızı in the region, is like a trade-mark of locally woven textiles. The color in question has always been popular in the region, and is also reflected in many artefacts from the Carian era.

== History ==
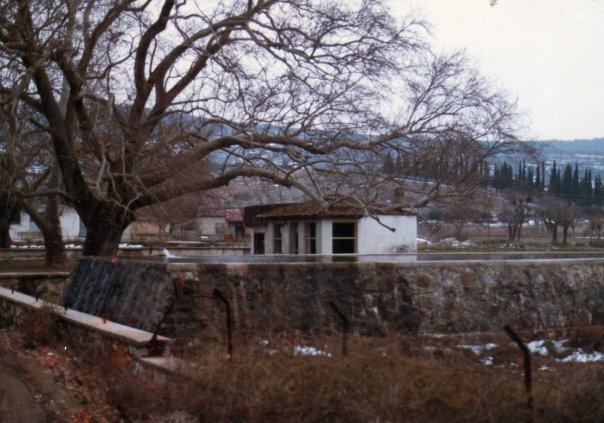
View from Yeşilyurt plain in winter

Some remains of the ancient settlement which consist of the acropolis called Pisi Asar, at a distance of about a mile to the south-east of Yeşilyurt and the site called Arslanlı further to the north, with traces of foundations and walls, are visible on the surface to this day. Arslanlı (the name meaning, the place with the lion) locality, at a distance of 2 kilometres (1.2 mi) from the town center to the north, is where a lion's statue, on display at the near the municipality building, as well as abundant pottery was found. Further traces of stone craftsmanship is also noticeable at Arslanlı and it has been suggested that ancient Pisye was constituted in two separate settlements. A number of additional findings aside from the lion's statue garnish the municipal park, and further ancient material can sometimes be detected in the structure of a few old houses and the old mosque.

Epigraphical evidence points out to the tendency shown by Pisye's ancient inhabitants to expand their sphere of influence in the direction of the sea, the coast being quite near at a distance only about twenty kilometers to the south-east. By some time in the middle of the third century BC (between 275 and 225 BC) Pisye had joined part of the population of Pladasa, located near the Gulf of Akbük on the Gulf of Kerme (Ceramic Gulf) in a sympoliteia in which the identity of the partners remained preserved in the new, combined entity. The joint designation persisted as late as the first century AD. This union, which may have been related to the financial troubles Pladasa was having in the late 4th century BC, had allowed Pisye to gain a port and was possibly the continuation of absorption, in fuller form this time, by Pisye of two other entities, Koloneis and Londeis, whose territories lay between Pisye and Pladasa.

Another mention of Pisye dates from 196 B.C., in which the Rhodian commander Niagoras is recorded as having re-taken Pisye (together with the cities of Idyma ve Kyllandis to the sea) from king Philip V of Macedon.

Under Rhodian domination the entire area of the subject "Rhodian Peraia" on the Anatolian mainland formed a buffer between Stratonikeia and the sea, in which Pisye played an important part. Both the main route along the valley of Marsyas down to the sea at Idyma at the furthest end of the Gulf of Keramos and the alternative route along the valley of the present-day Kartal Deresi (or Kocaçay) stream down to present-day Sarnıç and to the sea at present-day Akbük, slightly west of Idyma, were lined with a series of fortresses and Pisye was where the two routes converged.

The Turkish settlement in the region as a whole during the Menteşe period is known to have taken place through migrations following the Kütahya-Tavas axis. Many families in the town can trace their roots to Bozkır district of Konya. Also, with the decline of the Ottoman Empire, many Turkish migrants from the Balkans or Crete have settled here. Yeşilyurt has a cemetery in the typical Turkish style, situated at the top of a hill, with a view of the plain below.

The tomb of a sage named Pisili Hoca is among the graves, and it is told that Süleyman the Magnificent had paid Pisili Hoca a visit to receive his prayers on his way to the conquest of Rhodes. Today, the tomb is a much visited shrine of local importance, with prayers and sacrifices accompanying the visits.
