= Akbük =

Akbük is the name of several localities in Turkey;

- Akbük, Didim, a coastal township with its own municipality in Didim, Aydın Province in south-west Turkey
- Akbük, Muğla, a sea-side locality and a beach in Yerkesik township of Muğla city central district in Muğla Province in south-west Turkey
