= Thera (Caria) =

Ancient town of Caria

Coordinates: 37°08′14″N 28°16′57″E

Thera (Ancient Greek: Θήρα) was a town of Ancient Caria. It is mentioned by Arrian as one of the towns held by Orontobates.

Its site is located near Yerkesik, Muğla Province, Asiatic Turkey.

== Archaeology ==
In July 2022, archaeologists led by Prof. Dr. Abdulkadir Baran from Muğla Sıtkı Koçman University announced the discovery of hellenistic theater in Thera dates to the 2nd century BC.
