= Pisye =

Town of ancient Caria

Coordinates: 37°11′12″N 28°17′14″E

Pisye (Ancient Greek: Πισύη) or Pitye (Πίτυη) was a town of ancient Caria.

Its site is located near Yeşilyurt (formerly, Pissiköy), Asiatic Turkey.
