= Bayır, Muğla =

Bayır
- Neighbourhood
- Location in Turkey Bayır (Turkey Aegean)
- Coordinates: 37°16′N 28°13′E
- Country: Turkey
- Province: Muğla
- District: Menteşe
- Elevation: 415 m (1,362 ft)
- Population (2022): 5,403
- Time zone: UTC+3 (TRT)
- Postal code: 48050
- Area code: 0252

Bayır is a neighbourhood of the municipality and district of Menteşe, Muğla Province, Turkey. Its population is 5,403 (2022). Before the 2013 reorganisation, it was a town (belde).

== Geography ==
Bayır is situated on Turkish state highway D.550 which connects Muğla to İzmir. The distance to Muğla is 15 kilometres (9.3 mi).

== History ==
The original location of the settlement was 4 kilometres (2.5 mi) east of the present location along a creek. But in 1941 after an earthquake, it was relocated in the present place. In 1956 it was declared a seat of township.

== Economy ==
Local trade center of Muğla is in Bayır and there are marble workshops in the town. Bayır Dam, a dam situated 4 kilometres (2.5 mi) north east of the town is used for irrigated farming. There is also a livestock market in the town.
