= Hacırüstem, Menteşe =

Village in Turkey

Hacırüstem
- Neighbourhood
- Location in Turkey Hacırüstem (Turkey Aegean)
- Coordinates: 37°13′16″N 28°22′07″E
- Country: Turkey
- Province: Muğla
- District: Menteşe
- Population (2024): 417
- Time zone: UTC+3 (TRT)

Hacırüstem is a neighbourhood in the municipality and district of Menteşe, Muğla Province, Turkey. Its population is 417 (2024).
