= Sarnıçköy, Menteşe =

Village in Turkey

Sarnıçköy
- Neighbourhood
- Location in Turkey Sarnıçköy (Turkey Aegean)
- Coordinates: 37°04′29″N 28°07′52″E
- Country: Turkey
- Province: Muğla
- District: Menteşe
- Population (2024): 450
- Time zone: UTC+3 (TRT)

Sarnıçköy is a neighbourhood in the municipality and district of Menteşe, Muğla Province, Turkey. Its population is 450 (2024).
