= Yalıköy =

Yalıköy may refer to several places in Turkey:

- Yalıköy, Beykoz
- Yalıköy, Didim
- Yalıköy, Istanbul
