= Şeyh, Menteşe =

Village in Turkey

Şeyh
- Neighbourhood
- Location in Turkey Şeyh (Turkey Aegean)
- Coordinates: 37°13′01″N 28°21′58″E
- Country: Turkey
- Province: Muğla
- District: Menteşe
- Population (2024): 870
- Time zone: UTC+3 (TRT)

Şeyh is a neighbourhood in the municipality and district of Menteşe, Muğla Province, Turkey. Its population is 870 (2024).
