= Müştakbey, Menteşe =

Village in Turkey

Müştakbey
- Neighbourhood
- Location in Turkey Müştakbey (Turkey Aegean)
- Coordinates: 37°13′06″N 28°22′08″E
- Country: Turkey
- Province: Muğla
- District: Menteşe
- Population (2024): 817
- Time zone: UTC+3 (TRT)

Müştakbey is a neighbourhood in the municipality and district of Menteşe, Muğla Province, Turkey. Its population is 817 (2024).
