= Yeniköy Merkez =

Village in Turkey

- Neighbourhood
- Location in Turkey Yeniköy Merkez (Turkey Aegean)
- Coordinates: 37°09′53″N 28°24′12″E
- Country: Turkey
- Province: Muğla
- District: Menteşe
- Population (2022): 3,486
- Time zone: UTC+3 (TRT)

Yeniköy Merkez is a neighbourhood in the municipality and district of Menteşe, Muğla Province, Turkey. Its population was 3,486 in 2022.
