= Karacaören, Menteşe =

Village in Turkey

Karacaören
- Neighbourhood
- Location in Turkey Karacaören (Turkey Aegean)
- Coordinates: 37°13′05″N 28°45′10″E
- Country: Turkey
- Province: Muğla
- District: Menteşe
- Population (2024): 83
- Time zone: UTC+3 (TRT)

Karacaören is a neighbourhood in the municipality and district of Menteşe, Muğla Province, Turkey. Its population is 83 (2024).
