= Kiramettin, Menteşe =

Village in Turkey

Kiramettin
- Neighbourhood
- Location in Turkey Kiramettin (Turkey Aegean)
- Coordinates: 37°13′14″N 28°21′50″E
- Country: Turkey
- Province: Muğla
- District: Menteşe
- Population (2024): 1,272
- Time zone: UTC+3 (TRT)

Kiramettin is a neighbourhood in the municipality and district of Menteşe, Muğla Province, Turkey. Its population is 1,272 (2024).
