= Denizköy VLF transmitter =

US Navy facility in Aydin Province, Turkey

Coordinates: 37°24′43″N 27°19′25″E

Denizköy VLF transmitter, also known as Bafa transmitter, is a facility of US Navy for military VLF transmission near Denizköy in Didim district of Aydın Province, Turkey, at 37°24'43"N 27°19'25"E. The facility situated at Denizköy uses two 380 metres tall guyed masts, which are the tallest man-made structures in Turkey. The transmitter is active on 26700 Hz under the callsign TBB.

It usually transmits at 26.7 kHz, although shifts to 25.5 kHz,25.2 Khz or 25.15 kHz have been reported.

== See also ==
- List of tallest structures in Turkey
