= Orta, Menteşe =

Village in Turkey

Orta
- Neighbourhood
- Location in Turkey Orta (Turkey Aegean)
- Coordinates: 37°14′08″N 28°22′42″E
- Country: Turkey
- Province: Muğla
- District: Menteşe
- Population (2024): 678
- Time zone: UTC+3 (TRT)

Orta is a neighbourhood in the municipality and district of Menteşe, Muğla Province, Turkey. Its population is 678 (2024).
