= Paşapınar, Menteşe =

Village in Turkey

Paşapınar
- Neighbourhood
- Location in Turkey Paşapınar (Turkey Aegean)
- Coordinates: 37°15′24″N 28°13′03″E
- Country: Turkey
- Province: Muğla
- District: Menteşe
- Population (2024): 352
- Time zone: UTC+3 (TRT)

Paşapınar is a neighbourhood in the municipality and district of Menteşe, Muğla Province, Turkey. Its population is 352 (2024).
