= Karamehmet, Menteşe =

Village in Turkey

Karamehmet
- Neighbourhood
- Location in Turkey Karamehmet (Turkey Aegean)
- Coordinates: 37°13′13″N 28°21′20″E
- Country: Turkey
- Province: Muğla
- District: Menteşe
- Population (2024): 8,755
- Time zone: UTC+3 (TRT)

Karamehmet is a neighbourhood in the municipality and district of Menteşe, Muğla Province, Turkey. Its population is 8,755 (2024).
