= Çiftlikköy, Menteşe =

Village in Turkey

Çiftlikköy
- Neighbourhood
- Location in Turkey Çiftlikköy (Turkey Aegean)
- Coordinates: 37°10′59″N 28°09′42″E
- Country: Turkey
- Province: Muğla
- District: Menteşe
- Population (2024): 383
- Time zone: UTC+3 (TRT)

Çiftlikköy is a neighbourhood in the municipality and district of Menteşe, Muğla Province, Turkey. Its population is 383 (2024).
