= Yenimahalle, Didim =

Village in Turkey

Yenimahalle
- Neighbourhood
- Country: Turkey
- Province: Aydın
- District: Didim
- Population (2024): 17,742
- Time zone: UTC+3 (TRT)

Yenimahalle is a neighbourhood in the municipality and district of Didim, Aydın Province, Turkey. Its population is 17,742 (2024).
