= Ak-Yeniköy, Didim =

Ak-Yeniköy
- Neighbourhood
- Location in Turkey Ak-Yeniköy (Turkey Aegean)
- Coordinates: 37.4953°N 27.3030°E
- Country: Turkey
- Province: Aydın
- District: Didim
- Population (2022): 2,675
- Time zone: UTC+3 (TRT)

Ak-Yeniköy is a neighbourhood of the municipality and district of Didim, Aydın Province, Turkey. Its population is 2,675 (2022). Before the 2013 reorganisation, it was a town (belde).
