= Batıköy, Didim =

Batıköy
- Neighbourhood
- Location in Turkey Batıköy (Turkey Aegean)
- Coordinates: 37°31′57″N 27°14′43″E
- Country: Turkey
- Province: Aydın
- District: Didim
- Population (2022): 143
- Time zone: UTC+3 (TRT)

Batıköy is a neighbourhood in the municipality and district of Didim, Aydın Province, Turkey. Its population is 143 (2022).
