= Mersindere, Didim =

Village in Turkey

Mersindere
- Neighbourhood
- Location in Turkey Mersindere (Turkey Aegean)
- Coordinates: 37°24′51″N 27°13′32″E
- Country: Turkey
- Province: Aydın
- District: Didim
- Population (2024): 1,797
- Time zone: UTC+3 (TRT)

Mersindere is a neighbourhood in the municipality and district of Didim, Aydın Province, Turkey. Its population is 1,797 (2024).
