= Didim =

- District and municipality
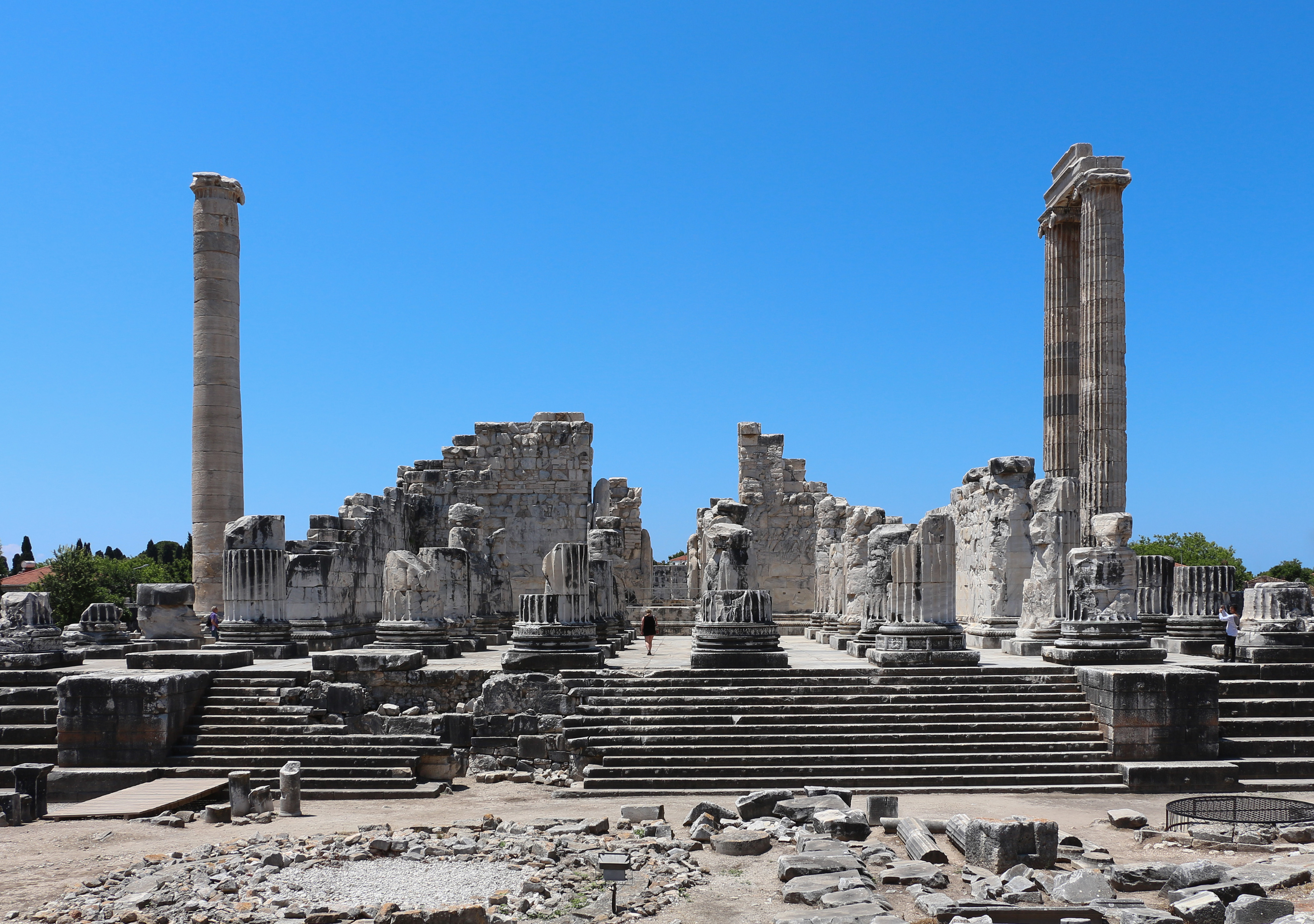
- Temple of Apollo

- Logo

- Map showing Didim District in Aydın Province

- Location within Turkey Location within Turkey Aegean
- Coordinates: 37°22′32″N 27°16′04″E
- Country: Turkey
- Province: Aydın

Government
  - Mayor: Hatice Gençay (CHP)
- Area: 424 km^{2} (164 sq mi)
- Population (2022): 97,000
  - Density: 230/km^{2} (590/sq mi)
- Time zone: UTC+3 (TRT)
- Postal code: 09270
- Area code: 0256
- Website: www.didim.bel.tr

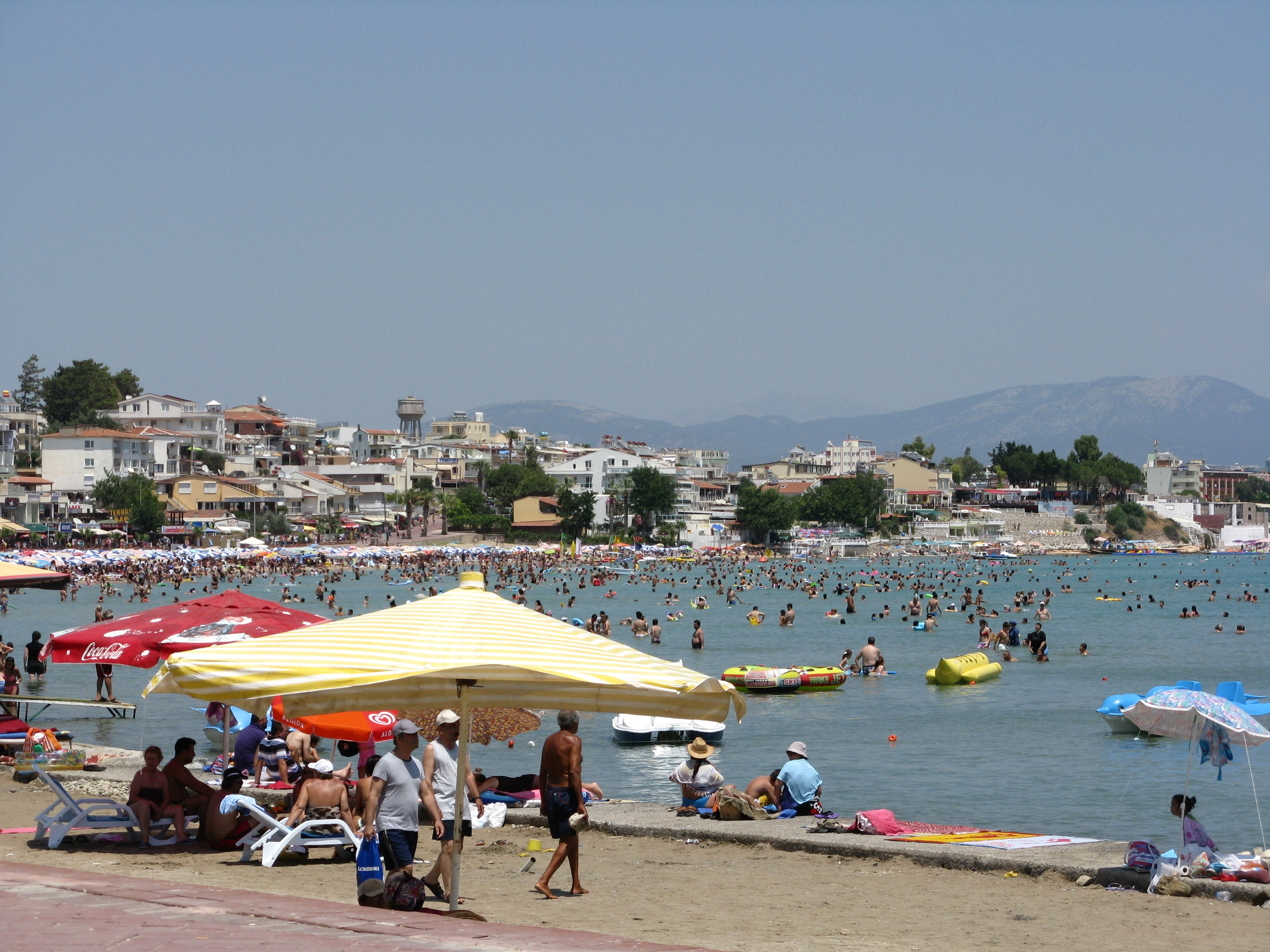
Altınkum

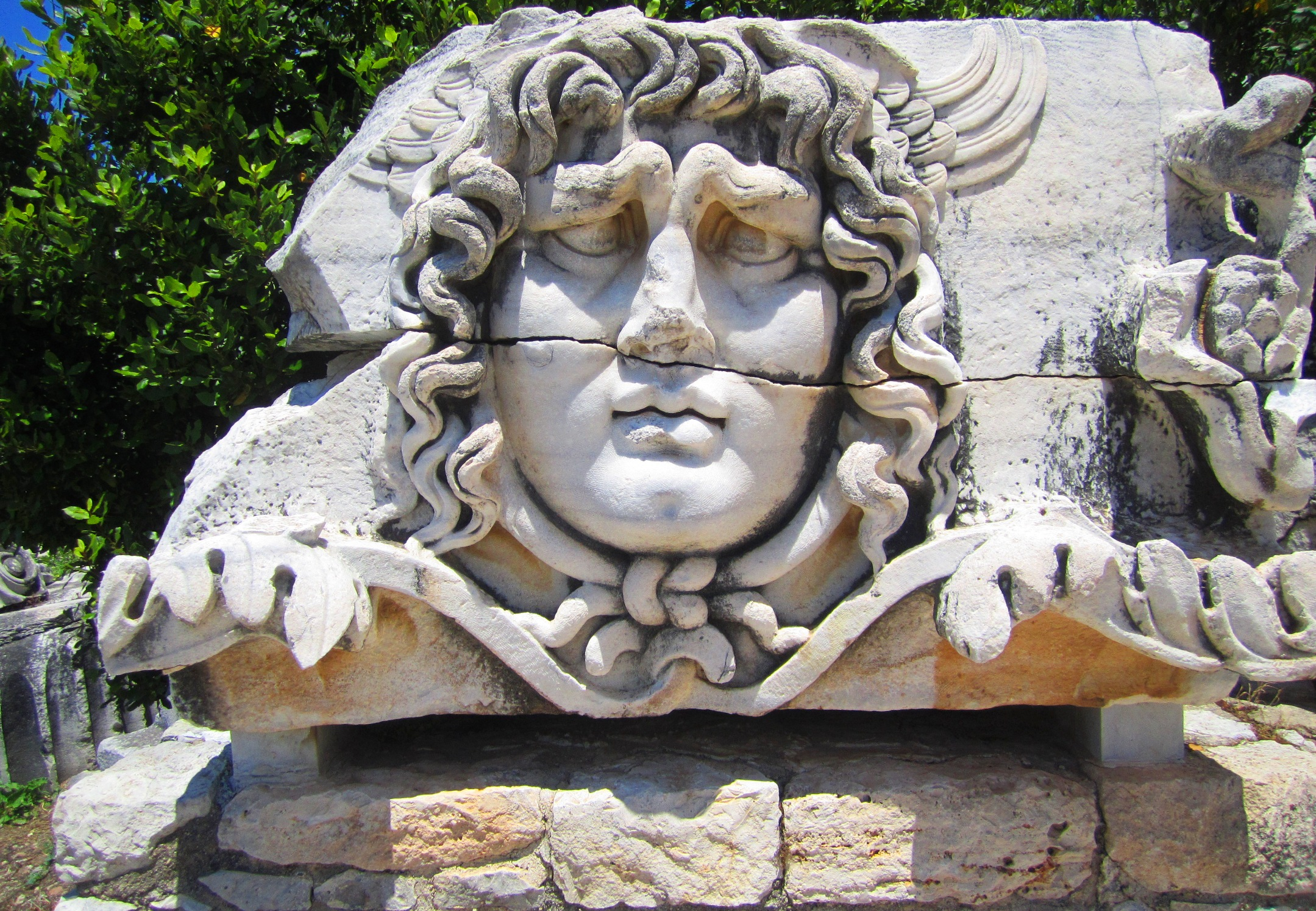
Medusa Head

Didim is a municipality and district of Aydın Province, Turkey. Its area is 424 km^{2}, and its population is 97,000 (2022). It is a popular seaside holiday resort on the Aegean coast of western Turkey, 123 km (76 mi) from the provincial capital city of Aydın. Didim is the site of the antique city of Didyma with its ruined Temple of Apollo.

== Etymology ==
Didim takes its name from the ancient Greek city of Didyma, situated close to the modern town. During the Ottoman Empire era, the town was known as Yoranda or Yoran, and under the modern Republic of Turkey, it was originally named Hisar ("Castle"). Following its destruction in an earthquake in 1955, the town was rebuilt and renamed Yenihisar ("New Castle"). The town was part of Söke district until 1991. The area became a top-level district of Aydın Province and was given the ancient Greek name Didim in 1997 to distinguish it from the many other places in Turkey named Yenihisar.

== History ==
The area was settled in the Neolithic period, established as colony of Crete and then Mycenae in the 16th century BC and subsequently possessed by Lycians, Persians, Seleucids, Attalids, Ancient Romans, and Byzantines as part of the province of Caria. The area came into the hands of Turks following the defeat of Byzantium at the Battle of Malazgirt in 1071. The town was captured again by the Byzantines in 1098, by Menteşe in 1280, and then Aydinids in 1300. Didim was brought into the Ottoman Empire by sultan Mehmed I in 1413. During the era of the Ottoman Empire, Didim's name was "Yoran".

== Geography ==
Didim is located on the north shore of the gulf of Güllük, opposite Bodrum peninsula villages such as Torba, Türkbükü, and Yalıkavak. In antiquity, this formed the Posideium Peninsula but silt from the Meander River has since filled in the inlet to its north, connecting it more thoroughly to the mainland.

Didim's district consists of Didim itself, a coastal town of 26,000 people, and a number of small towns including Altınkum (which means "golden sand"), Gümüşkum ("silver sand") and Sarıkum ("yellow sand"). Its neighbours are Söke from north-east and Milas from south-east.

Tourism is the main source of income for the area, especially in summer, but agriculture is also an important contributor; the main crops are wheat and cotton. Animals, especially sheep and goats, are raised mainly for local consumption.

== Administrative divisions ==
There are 14 neighbourhoods in Didim District:

- Akbük
- Akköy
- Ak-Yeniköy
- Altınkum
- Balat
- Batıköy
- Çamlık
- Cumhuriyet
- Denizköy
- Efeler
- Fevzipaşa
- Hisar
- Mavişehir
- Mersindere
- Yalıköy
- Yenimahalle

== Tourism ==
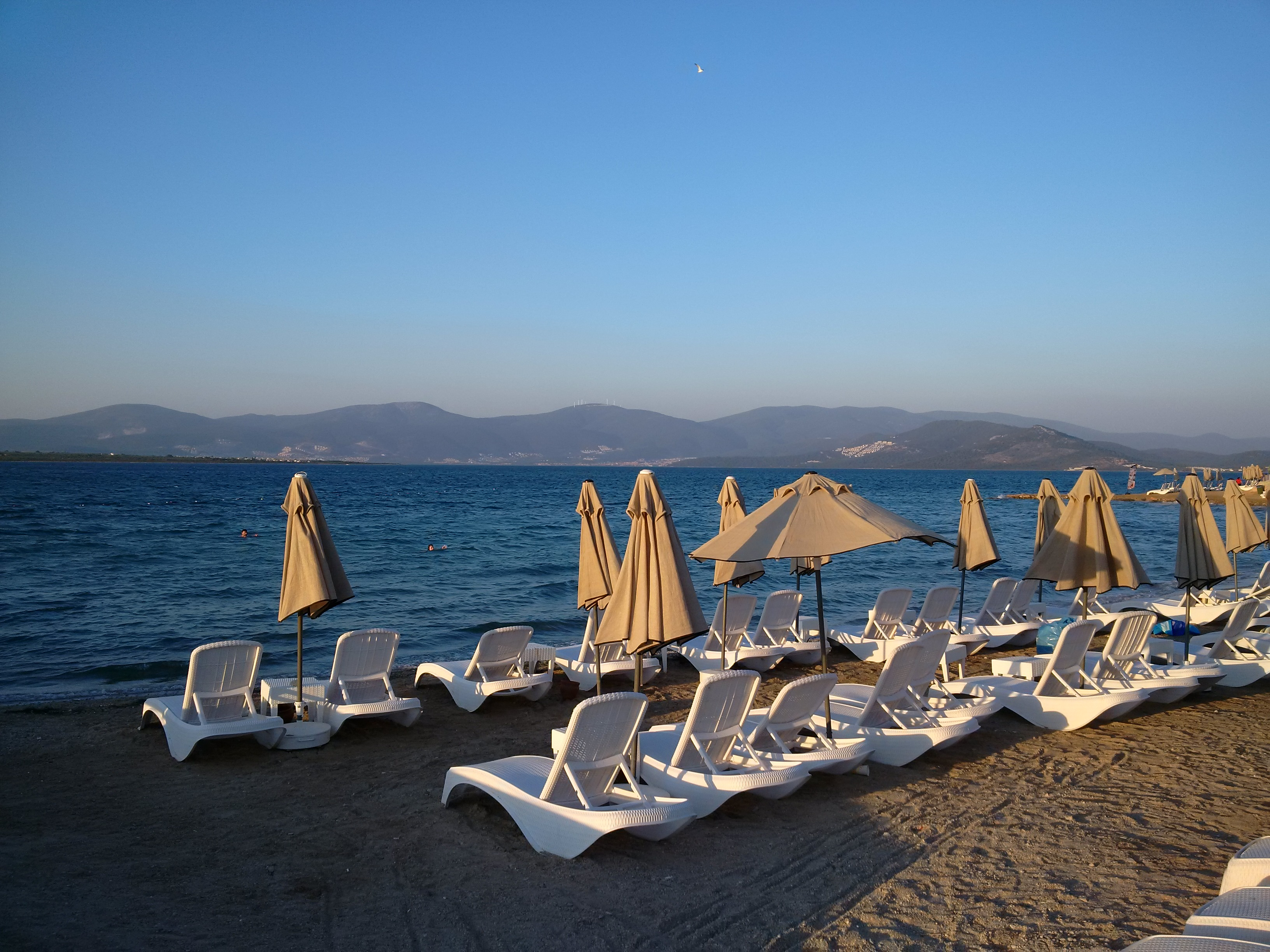
Altınkum

This coast has become a very popular holiday resort, known for its long sandy beaches, clear blue sea, ancient ruins, and its own microclimate, benefiting from hundreds of days of sun annually and warm winters, allowing residents to use the beaches and engage in watersports even in January. Less frequented beaches are ones further from the centre, such as Haydar, along a dirt road around the shore of Akbük (meaning "white forest").

Recent renewal of main roads means the area is easily served by Bodrum and İzmir airports.

Because of Didim's location, people in the 1980s came from close cities around Turkey, especially Aydın, began to buy or built summer houses, apartments, and villas in the area. Most of these were built as cooperative housing projects with private beaches. Property values have recently been rising, and the building boom continues as foreign buyers, especially the families from other cities of Turkiye such as Denizli and Ankara, Turks living and working in Europe, follow their lead. The growth of Didim in the 1980s was further accelerated with the building of hotels to accommodate visitors, originally from Britain but now from Turkey itself, on inexpensive package holidays. Since about 2000, British people have begun to buy summer houses in Didim, establishing themselves as a visible community of many thousands, to the extent that utility bills in the district are now printed in English as well as Turkish. Many bars around Didim are noted for having the Union Jack hanging inside.

Didim town has hotels, amusement park, gift shops, hidden bays and beaches, and the antique Temple of Apollo and Temple of Artemis nearby. Didim is also close to a number of other ancient towns and natural formations, such as Lake Bafa national park, the Büyük Menderes River, and historic sites like Miletus and Priene.

Didim has night clubs, beach clubs, smaller bars and pubs, some with live music. There are American pubs, Irish and British bars and Turkish bars with Eastern-Anatolian folk musics.

Didim Marina (D-Marin Didim) was constructed by Doğuş Holding and became operational in 2009 with berths for 8 m to 50 m boats, 400-ton boat lift, dry docks, hangars, maintenance yard, yacht club, shopping mall, restaurants, and visitor facilities. The new marina is expected to encourage further tourism and rising property prices in the area.

City municipality carries out some specific events and festivals such as Vegan Fest, Lavender Fest and Autograph Sessions of famous Turkish authors every summer.

== Places of interest ==
- The ruins of the Ionic Temple of Apollo with its columns pointing up into the sky and its legend of the romance between Apollo and Daphne is nearby. The original temple and home of an oracle was destroyed during the Persian Wars and the one seen today was rebuilt following Alexander the Great's victory over the Persians
- Miletos, the ruins of the ancient city including a well-preserved antique theatre, stadium, baths of Faustina, and the temple of Serapis
- Denizköy VLF transmitter, a transmitter of the US military with two 380-meter-tall guyed masts

== Climate ==
Didim (Aydin) has a Mediterranean climate consisting of very hot, long and dry summers with an average of 34 °C (93 °F) in the daytime, winters are cool and rainy with a daytime average of 14 °C (57 °F).

Climate data for Fethiye
Month	Jan	Feb	Mar	Apr	May	Jun	Jul	Aug	Sep	Oct	Nov	Dec	Year
Mean daily maximum °C (°F)	13.4 (56.1)	14.6 (58.3)	18.1 (64.6)	22.4 (72.3)	28.4 (83.1)	33.5 (92.3)	36.1 (97.0)	35.5 (95.9)	31.9 (89.4)	26.3 (79.3)	19.5 (67.1)	14.4 (57.9)	24.5 (76.1)
Mean daily minimum °C (°F)	4.2 (39.6)	4.8 (40.6)	6.8 (44.2)	10.1 (50.2)	14.1 (57.4)	18.1 (64.6)	20.4 (68.7)	20.1 (68.2)	16.5 (61.7)	12.7 (54.9)	8.4 (47.1)	5.5 (41.9)	11.8 (53.3)
Average precipitation mm (inches)	99.5 (3.92)	93.0 (3.66)	70.7 (2.78)	53.7 (2.11)	33.2 (1.31)	15.7 (0.62)	8.9 (0.35)	5.7 (0.22)	15.5 (0.61)	45.4 (1.79)	85.9 (3.38)	111.3 (4.38)	638.5 (25.13)
Average rainy days	10.9	10.1	9.1	8.8	6.0	2.5	1.8	1.2	3.0	5.6	8.3	12.0	79.3
Source: Devlet Meteoroloji İşleri Genel Müdürlüğü

== International Relations ==
Didim is twinned with:

- Laubach, Germany
- Leros, Greece
- Bulanık, Turkey

== Education ==
There are 4 kindergartens, 13 primary schools, 11 secondary schools, 7 high schools, 1 public education center, 1 vocational training center, 1 science and art center affiliated with the Ministry of National Education in the district.
