= Efeler, Didim =

Village in Turkey

Efeler
- Neighbourhood
- Location in Turkey Efeler (Turkey Aegean)
- Coordinates: 37°22′30″N 27°15′42″E
- Country: Turkey
- Province: Aydın
- District: Didim
- Population (2024): 25,566
- Time zone: UTC+3 (TRT)

Efeler is a neighbourhood in the municipality and district of Didim, Aydın Province, Turkey. Its population is 25,566 (2024).
