= Gülağzı, Menteşe =

Village in Turkey

Gülağzı
- Neighbourhood
- Location in Turkey Gülağzı (Turkey Aegean)
- Coordinates: 37°8′N 28°21′E
- Country: Turkey
- Province: Muğla
- District: Menteşe
- Population (2022): 1,217
- Time zone: UTC+3 (TRT)

Gülağzı is a neighbourhood in the municipality and district of Menteşe, Muğla Province, Turkey. Its population was 1,217 in 2022.
