= List of tallest structures in Turkey =

An incomplete list of the tallest structures in Turkey. The list contains all types of structures taller than 150 metres in Turkey.

| Structure | Place | Structural type | Year of built | Pinnacle height | Pinnacle height | Geographical coordinates | Remarks |
|---|---|---|---|---|---|---|---|
| Bafa VLF transmitter | Didim | Guyed mast | 2000 | 1247 ft | 380 m | 37°24′58.21″N 27°19′17.66″E ; 37°24′33.67″N 27°19′30.36″E | used by US military |
| Çamlıca TV Tower | İstanbul | Concrete tower | 2021 | 1211 ft | 369 m | 41°00′59.08″N 29°03′55.94″E | |
| Central Bank of the Republic of Turkey | İstanbul | Skyscraper | 2024 | 1161 ft | 353 m | 41.00192274544748°N 29.110347422004246°E | |
| 1915 Çanakkale Bridge | Lapseki | Suspension bridge | 2022 | 1096 ft | 334 m | 40°20′41.14″N 26°37′35.58″E ; 40°20′04.88″N 26°38′47.54″E | Longest suspension bridge in the world |
| Yavuz Sultan Selim Bridge | İstanbul | cable-stayed, suspension bridge | 2016 | 1056 ft | 322 m | 41°12′23.08″N 29°06′16.96″E ; 41°11′58.88″N 29°07′08.4″E | |
| Kemerkoy Power Plant Chimney | Muğla | Chimney | 1983 | 984 ft | 300 m | 37°02′7.31″N 27°54′2.08″E | |
| Soma Power Plant Chimney | Manisa | Chimney | ? | 918 ft | 280 m | 39°11′42.3″N 27°38′10.9″E | |
| Orhaneli Power Plant Chimney | Orhaneli | Chimney | 1992 | 902 ft | 275 m | 39°57′0.81″N 28°52′12.65″E | |
| Sapphire of Istanbul | İstanbul | Skyscraper | 2011 | 856 ft | 261 m | 41°05′6.28″N 29°00′21.96″E | |
| Etimesgut transmitter | Etimesgut | Guyed mast | 1938 | 840 ft | 256 m | 39°56′14.3″N 32°40′2.88″E ; 39°56′24.05″N 32°40′3.03″E | used for broadcasting on 198 kHz, demolished |
| TBG Radio Mast | Polatlı | Guyed mast | ? | 827 ft | 252 m | 40°10′18.17″N 26°24′34.47″E | used for transmissions on 53.4 kHz with the call sign TBG |
| ZETES III Power Plant Chimney | Kilimli | Chimney | ? | 825 ft | 251.5 m | 41°30′53.06″N 31°54′32.78″E | |
| Ağrı longwave transmitter | Ağrı | Guyed mast | ? | 820 ft | 250 m | 39°46′23.11″N 43°02′14.55″E ; 39°46′25.86″N 43°02′33.32″E | used for broadcasting on 162 kHz |
| Polatlı longwave transmitter | Polatlı | Guyed mast | ? | 820 ft | 250 m | 39°45′22.46″N 32°25′6.24″E | used for broadcasting on 180 kHz |
| Van longwave transmitter | Van | Guyed mast | ? | 820 ft | 250 m | 38°35′11.47″N 43°15′59.17″E | used for broadcasting on 225 kHz |
| Osman Gazi Bridge | Gebze | Suspension bridge | 2016 | 769.11 ft | 234.425 m | 40°45′42.12″N 29°31′01.2″E ; 40°44′52.19″N 29°30′53.06″E | Former longest suspension bridge in the world |
| Çatalca Mediumwave transmitter | Çatalca | Guyed mast | ? | 741 ft | 226 m | 41°11′3.3″N 28°30′44.13″E | used for broadcasting on 702 kHz |
| Endem TV Tower | İstanbul | Concrete tower | ? | 741 ft | 226 m | 41°01′35.1″N 28°37′14.02″E | |
| Anthill Residence 1 | İstanbul | Skyscraper | ? | 689 ft | 210 m | 41°03′25.47″N 28°58′33.47″E | |
| Anthill Residence 2 | İstanbul | Skyscraper | ? | 689 ft | 210 m | 41°03′23.85″N 28°58′36.79″E | |
| Chimney of İskenderun Power Station | İskenderun | Chimney | 2014 | 689 ft | 210 m | 36°41′28.11″N 36°12′31.06″E | |
| Chimney of Yeniköy Power Plant | Mugla | Chimney | | 656 ft | 200 m | 37°08′25.06″N 27°52′16.98″E | |
| İş Bank Tower | İstanbul | Skyscraper | ? | 640 ft | 195 m | 41°4′58.71″N 29°0′40.71″E | |
| Republic Tower | Ankara | Skyscraper | ? | 618 ft | 188.4 m | | |
| Erzurum longwave transmitter | Kahramanlar | Guyed mast | ? | 607 ft | 185 m | 39°59′53.59″N 41°06′40.95″E | used for broadcasting on 245 kHz |
| Chimney of İzdemir Power Plant | Horozgediği | Chimney | | 591 ft | 180 m | 38°44′29.09″N 26°55′47.59″E | |
| Mertim Hotel Mersin | Mersin | Skyscraper | ? | 577 ft | 176.8 m | | |
| Şişli Plaza | İstanbul | Skyscraper | ? | 558 ft | 170.1 m | 41°3′37.58″N 28°59′28.72″E | |
| Bosporus Bridge | İstanbul | Suspension Bridge Tower | ? | 554 ft | 169 m | 41°2′58.43″N 29°01′48.38″E ; 41°2′30.87″N 29°02′17.12″E | |
| New Kömürhan Bridge | Kale | Cable-stayed bridge | 2021 | 553 ft | 168.5 m | 38°26′23.39″N 38°48′59.26″E | |
| Tekstilkent Plaza | İstanbul | Skyscraper | ? | 551 ft | 168 m | 41°4′7.7″N 28°51′51.64″E ; 41°04′7.17″N 28°51′54.46″E | |
| Torbalı TV Tower | Torbalı | Concrete tower | ? | 541 ft | 165 m | 38°32′3.5″N 27°11′13.69″E | |
| Selenium Twins | İstanbul | Skyscraper | ? | 541 ft | 165 m | 41°3′14.17″N 29°00′1.14″E ; 41°03′15.01″N 29°0′3.56″E | |
| Selçuklu Tower | Konya | Skyscraper | 2006 | 535 ft | 163 m | | |
| Kozağacı Mediumwave transmitter | Kozağacı | Guyed mast | ? | 535 ft | 163 m | 36°55′39.9″N 30°56′30.14″E ; 36°55′37.12″N 30°56′30.02″E | |
| Pylons of Bosporus Overhead Powerline Crossing 3 | İstanbul | Lattice tower | ? | 528 ft | 161 m | 41°10′36.64″N 29°4′12.72″E ; 41°10′1.54″N 29°5′18.4″E | |
| Portakal Çiçeği Tower | Ankara | Skyscraper | ? | 525 ft | 160 m | 39°53′17.36″N 32°50′58.54″E | |
| Çamlıca TV Tower | İstanbul | Concrete tower | ? | 525 ft | 160 m | 41°01′55.82″N 29°04′9.36″E | |
| Sabancı Center 1 | İstanbul | Skyscraper | ? | 518 ft | 158 m | 41°5′5.11″N 29°0′37.66″E | |
| Trump Towers - Residence Tower | İstanbul | Skyscraper | ? | 507 ft | 154.5 m | 41°4′4.74″N 28°59′33.04″E | |
| Malatya Mediumwave transmitter | Malatya | Guyed mast | ? | 505 ft | 154 m | 38°25′37.68″N 38°17′12.77″E | |
| Süzer Plaza Ritz-Carlton | İstanbul | Skyscraper | ? | 504 ft | 153.7 m | 41°2′24.66″N 28°59′32.45″E | |
| Mudanya Mediumwave transmitter | Mudanya | Guyed mast | ? | 502 ft | 153 m | 40°21′10.55″N 28°41′6.63″E | |
| Gaziantep Mediumwave transmitter | Gaziantep | Guyed mast | ? | 502 ft | 153 m | 37°03′18.07″N 37°18′34.65″E | |
| Trabzon Mediumwave transmitter | Trabzon | Guyed mast | ? | 502 ft | 153 m | 40°59′13.62″N 39°46′2.44″E | |
| Polat Tower Residence | İstanbul | Skyscraper | ? | 500 ft | 152.5 m | 41°3′23.78″N 28°59′56.97″E | |
| Adana TV Mast | Adana | Guyed mast | ? | 492 ft | 150 m | 36°49′33.1″N 35°37′52.53″E | |
| Chimney of Sugözü Power Station | Sugözü | Chimney | 2003 | 492 ft | 150 m | 36°50′6.44″N 35°52′44.39″E | |
| Süleymaniye TV Mast | Süleymaniye | Guyed mast | ? | 492 ft | 150 m | 41°6′49.7″N 26°48′50.96″E | |
