= Balat, Didim =

Balat
- Neighbourhood
- Location in Turkey Balat (Turkey Aegean)
- Coordinates: 37°30′44″N 27°16′37″E
- Country: Turkey
- Province: Aydın
- District: Didim
- Population (2022): 1,036
- Time zone: UTC+3 (TRT)

Balat is a neighbourhood in the municipality and district of Didim, Aydın Province, Turkey. Its population is 1,036 (2022). The ruins of the ancient Greek city of Miletus are near the village.
