= Altınkum =

- Neighbourhood
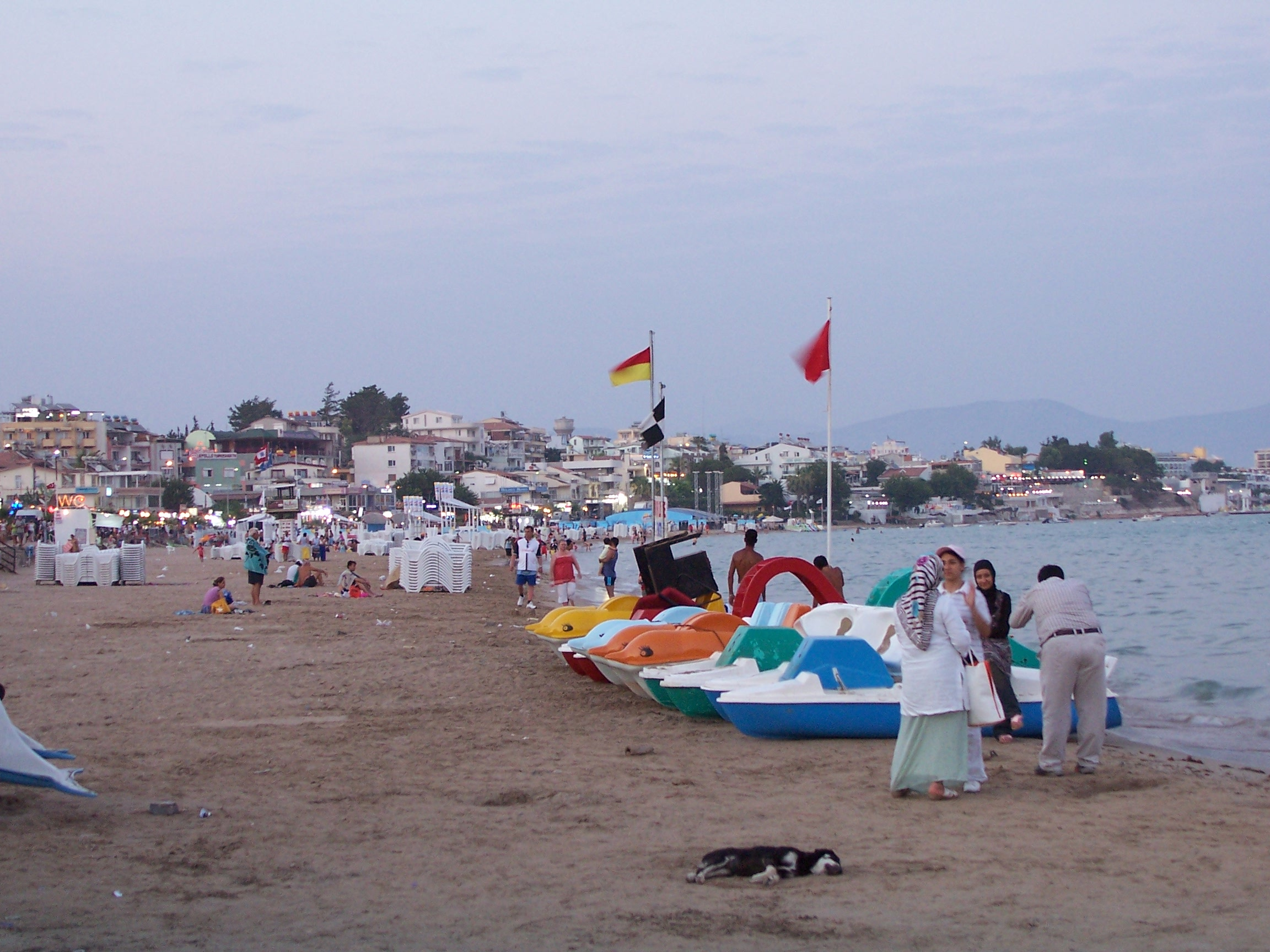

- Location within Turkey Location within Turkey Aegean
- Coordinates: 37°21′22″N 27°17′20″E
- Country: Turkey
- Province: Aydın
- District: Didim
- Population (2022): 5,516
- Time zone: UTC+3 (TRT)

Altınkum is a neighbourhood of the municipality and district of Didim, Aydın Province, Turkey. Its population is 5,516 (2022). It is a seaside resort on the Aegean Sea, 123 km from Aydın. It is near the ancient Temple of Apollo and the ruins of the Ionian city of Didyma (Didim).

== Location ==
Altinkum and Didim are located in Aydın Province between the city of İzmir and the resort Bodrum, about a 90-minute car ride either direction. Nearest airports: Bodrum Milas Airport and Izmir Adnan Menderes Airport however you can always access from Dalaman Airport same time.

The Greek holiday island Kos is an hour's boat ride away and Samos, Rhodes and Kuşadası are also in range. The region has developed from a string of small rural fishing villages into a tourist area. Altınkum and Didim were formerly two separate towns, but have grown together with a combined population of approximately 35,000 permanent residents, including about 5000 foreigners, mostly British with some Germans. In the 2022 census the population of Altinkum Didim is 97000.

Altinkum, or “golden sands”, is the beach and promenade area within the town of Didim. Visitors are predominantly Turkish or British but over recent years tourists from countries such as Hungary, Bulgaria and Romania have been visiting in increasing numbers, mostly families and the older generation. Set on a sandy bay, the resort is relaxed and informal. There are three beaches within easy reach, and all have been awarded the Blue Flag Award. With 55 km (34 miles) of coastline in the immediate area, there are many beaches to explore, including eleven that have been awarded a Blue Flag classification.

The Main beach in front of the resort is a long wide stretch of sand with sunbathing and water sports. Sun beds and umbrellas are available for rent. Boat trips that tour the nearby coastline depart from the main harbour, serving lunch and afternoon tea on board. Along the length of the beach are cafes, bars and restaurants.

The Second beach area is just to the east of Main beach and Third Beach is to the west. Just beyond Third beach is Didim marina, currently one of the largest in Turkey which opened in September 2009 and has space for 1200 boats. There are café bars and restaurants within the marina.

== History ==
Altınkum and Didim (previously Didyma or Yenihisar) is surrounded by a number of ancient sites, most notably, the Apollo Temple, located on the outskirts of Didim. The main temple was built in the 8th century B.C., was surrounded by columns at the beginning of the 6th century B.C. and completed around 550 B.C.

Miletos and Ephesus is a short drive away, and also Meryemana - said to be the Virgin Mary's last home. Many pilgrims visit this place every year.

On the grounds of the Apollo Temple is a stone head of the gargoyle Medusa.

A road leading to a small harbour was lined with ancient statues, but they were taken to the British Museum in 1858.
