= Mavişehir, Didim =

Village in Turkey

Mavişehir
- Neighbourhood
- Location in Turkey Mavişehir (Turkey Aegean)
- Coordinates: 37°23′44″N 27°13′30″E
- Country: Turkey
- Province: Aydın
- District: Didim
- Population (2024): 1,520
- Time zone: UTC+3 (TRT)

Mavişehir is a neighbourhood in the municipality and district of Didim, Aydın Province, Turkey. Its population is 1,520 (2024).
