= Fevzipaşa, Didim =

Village in Turkey

Fevzipaşa
- Neighbourhood
- Country: Turkey
- Province: Aydın
- District: Didim
- Population (2024): 2,334
- Time zone: UTC+3 (TRT)

Fevzipaşa is a neighbourhood in the municipality and district of Didim, Aydın Province, Turkey. Its population is 2,334 (2024).
