= Akköy, Didim =

Akköy
- Neighbourhood
- Location in Turkey Akköy (Turkey Aegean)
- Coordinates: 37.4894°N 27.2632°E
- Country: Turkey
- Province: Aydın
- District: Didim
- Population (2022): 1,103
- Time zone: UTC+3 (TRT)
- Postal code: 09270
- Area code: 0256

Akköy is a neighbourhood in the municipality and district of Didim, Aydın Province, Turkey. Its population is 1,103 (2022). It is situated near the western Turkish coast just south of İzmir. The town is named after its white stone houses ("ak" is Turkish for white, "köy" means village).

The village of Akköy is close to the ruins of the ancient city of Miletus.

Akköy lies just south of the Büyük Menderes river delta.
