= Akbük, Didim =

Akbük
- Neighbourhood
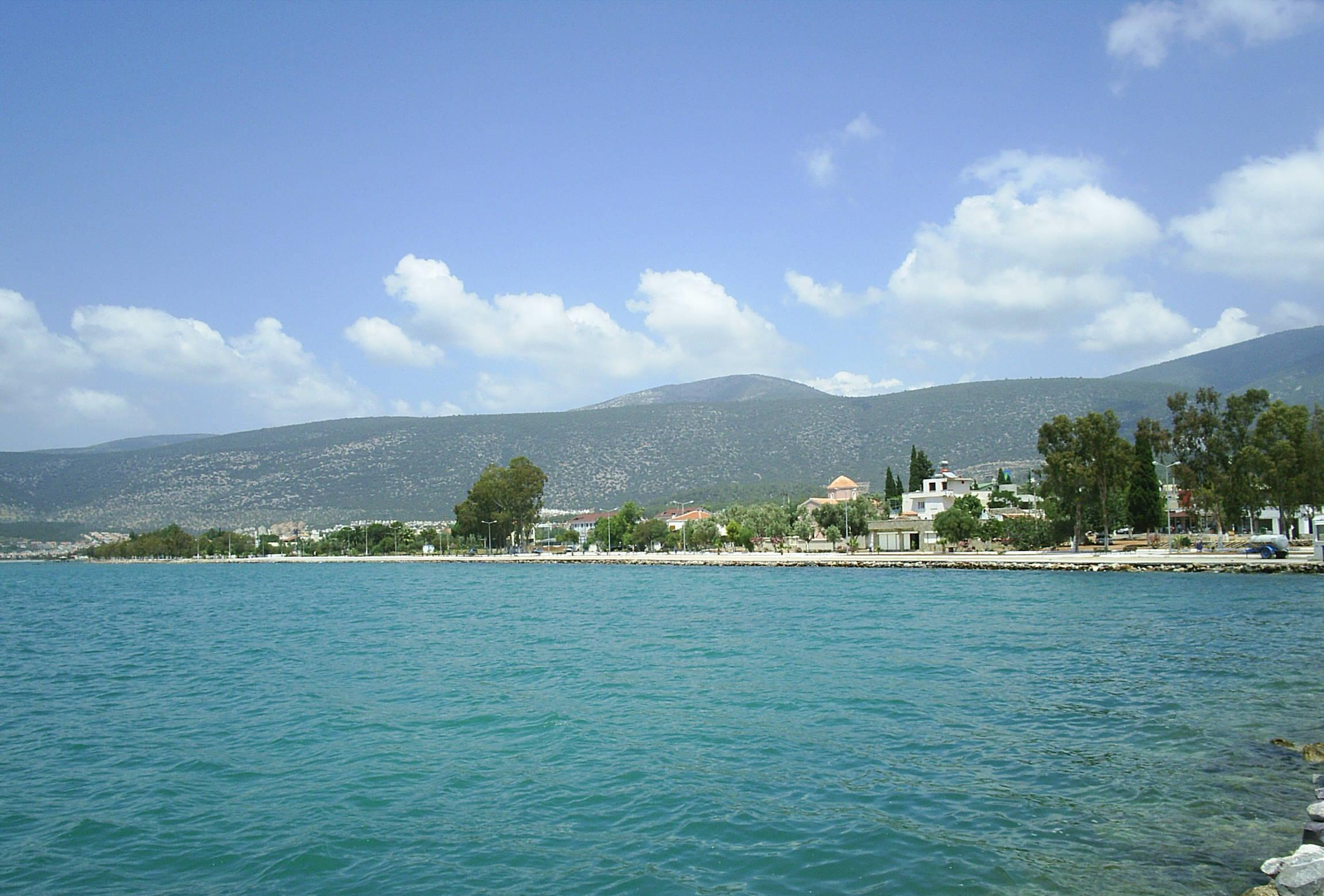
- Akbük coastline

- Location within Turkey Location within Turkey Aegean
- Coordinates: 37.39103°N 27.43853°E
- Country: Turkey
- Province: Aydın
- District: Didim
- Population (2022): 7,643
- Time zone: UTC+3 (TRT)
- Postal code: 09295
- Area code: 0256

Akbük is a neighbourhood of the municipality and district of Didim, Aydın Province, Turkey. Its population is 7,643 (2022). Before the 2013 reorganisation, it was a town (belde).

It is a small holiday resort on a bay in the Aegean Region near Didim. It has a permanent population of 7,600 and a summer population of 50,000. It was bounded to Milas district in Muğla Province before being moved to the Didim district in Aydın Province in 1991. It was a municipality since 1991. Akbük is served by Milas–Bodrum Airport, which is approximately 60 km away, and Adnan Menderes Airport in İzmir, which is approximately 140 km away.

Akbük continues to be predominantly a holiday resort for Turkish people with around 60,000 visitors in the summer, most of whom own property in the town. The expansion of hotels and holiday complex sites in the area has led to an increase of foreign visitors from Europe and Russia.

In addition to Turkish, English and German are widely spoken as well.
