= Denizköy, Didim =

Denizköy
- Neighbourhood
- Location in Turkey Denizköy (Turkey Aegean)
- Coordinates: 37°24′36″N 27°21′36″E
- Country: Turkey
- Province: Aydın
- District: Didim
- Population (2022): 1,085
- Time zone: UTC+3 (TRT)

Denizköy is a neighbourhood in the municipality and district of Didim, Aydın Province, Turkey. Its population is 1,085 (2022).
