= Yalıköy, Didim =

Yalıköy
- Neighbourhood
- Location in Turkey Yalıköy (Turkey Aegean)
- Coordinates: 37°25′26″N 27°13′55″E
- Country: Turkey
- Province: Aydın
- District: Didim
- Population (2022): 2,485
- Time zone: UTC+3 (TRT)

Yalıköy is a neighbourhood in the municipality and district of Didim, Aydın Province, Turkey. Its population is 2,485 (2022).
