= Yerkesik, Menteşe =

Village in Turkey

Yerkesik
- Neighbourhood
- Location in Turkey Yerkesik (Turkey Aegean)
- Coordinates: 37°08′14″N 28°17′03″E
- Country: Turkey
- Province: Muğla
- District: Menteşe
- Population (2022): 2,335
- Time zone: UTC+3 (TRT)

Yerkesik is a neighbourhood in the municipality and district of Menteşe, Muğla Province, Turkey. Its population was 2,335 in 2022.
