= Menteşe, Muğla =

District and second level municipality in Muğla Province, Turkey

Menteşe
- District and municipality
- Map showing Menteşe District in Muğla Province

- Location in Turkey Menteşe (Turkey Aegean)
- Coordinates: 37°13′5″N 28°21′54″E
- Country: Turkey
- Province: Muğla

Government
  - Mayor: Gonca Köksal (CHP)
- Area: 1,659 km^{2} (641 sq mi)
- Population (2022): 120,627
  - Density: 72.71/km^{2} (188.3/sq mi)
- Time zone: UTC+3 (TRT)
- Area code: 0252
- Website: www.mentese.bel.tr

Menteşe is a municipality and district of Muğla Province, Turkey. Its area is 1,659 km^{2}, and its population is 120,627 (2022). It covers the city of Muğla and the surrounding countryside.

The district and municipality Menteşe was created at the 2013 Turkish local government reorganisation from the former central district of Muğla. Menteşe was the name of a 14th-century beylik in and around Muğla Province.

== Composition ==
There are 65 neighbourhoods in Menteşe District:

- Akçaova
- Akkaya
- Akyer
- Algı
- Avcılar
- Balıbey
- Bayır
- Bozyer
- Çakmak
- Camikebir
- Çamoluk
- Çatakbağyaka
- Çaybükü
- Çiftlikköy
- Çırpı
- Dağdibi
- Dağpınar
- Denizova
- Derinkuyu
- Doğan
- Dokuzçam
- Düğerek
- Emirbeyazıt
- Esençay
- Fadıl
- Gazeller
- Göktepe
- Gülağzı
- Günlüce
- Hacırüstem
- İkizce
- Kafaca
- Karacaören
- Karamehmet
- Karşıyaka
- Kiramettin
- Kıran
- Kötekli
- Kozağaç
- Kuyucak
- Kuzluk
- Meke
- Muratlar
- Muslihittin
- Müştakbey
- Orhaniye
- Orta
- Ortaköy
- Özlüce
- Paşapınar
- Salihpaşalar
- Sarnıçköy
- Şenyayla
- Şeyh
- Sungur
- Taşlı
- Yaraş
- Yemişendere
- Yenibağyaka
- Yenice
- Yeniköy Merkez
- Yerkesik
- Yeşilyurt
- Yürükoğlu
- Zeytin

== Education ==
There are 10 kindergartens, 32 primary schools, 23 secondary schools, 16 high schools, one public education center, two vocational training centers, one counseling and research center, and one science and art center affiliated with the Ministry of National Education in the district.
