= Muğla Province =

Province of Turkey

Coordinates: 37°01′49″N 28°30′23″E

Muğla Province Muğla ili
- Province and metropolitan municipality
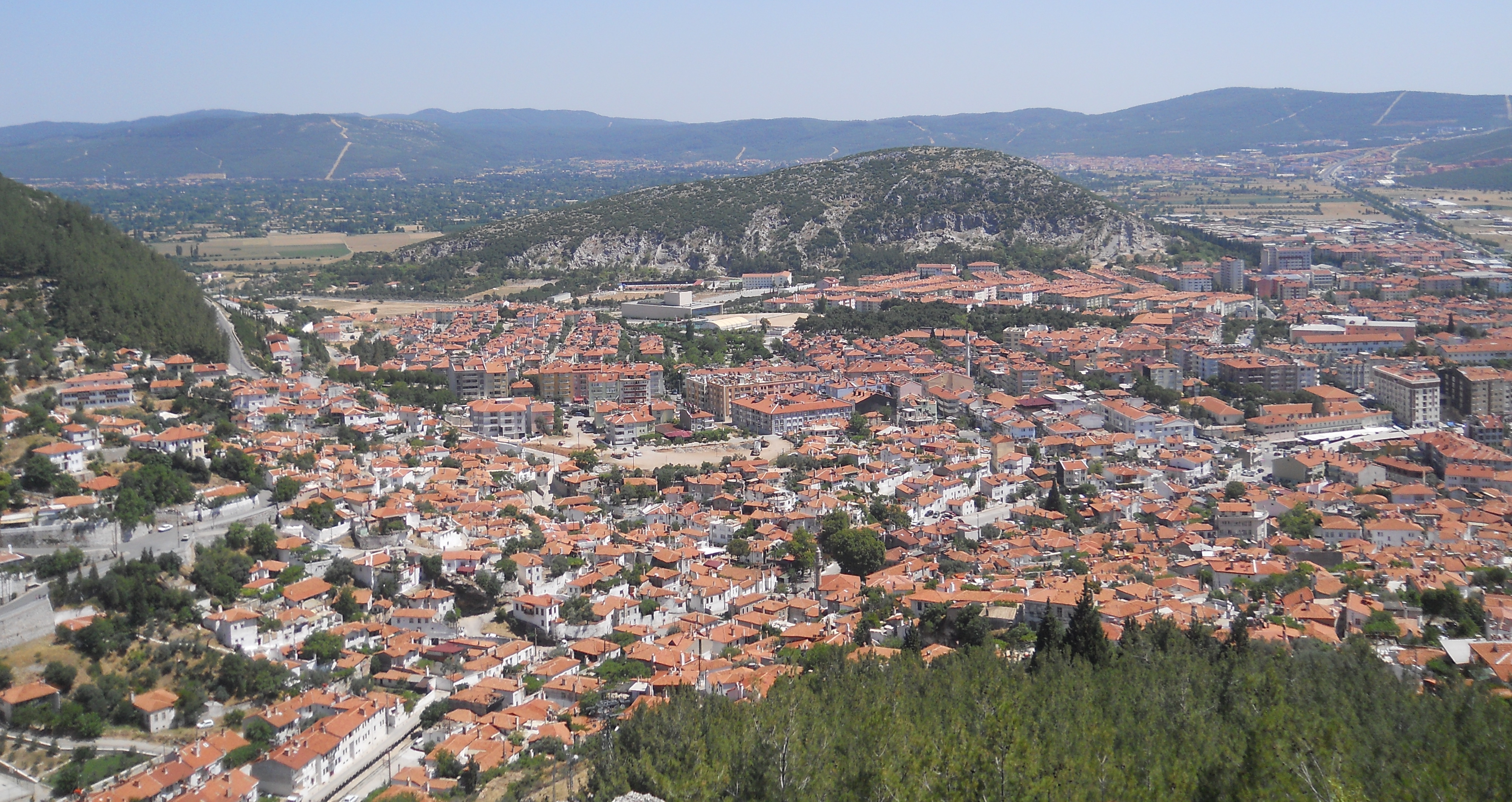
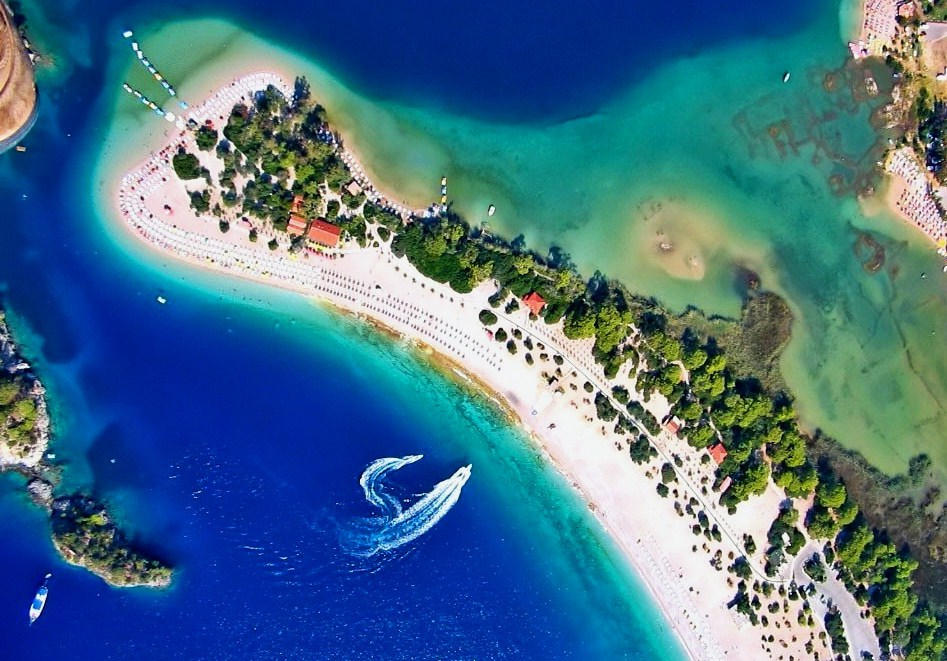
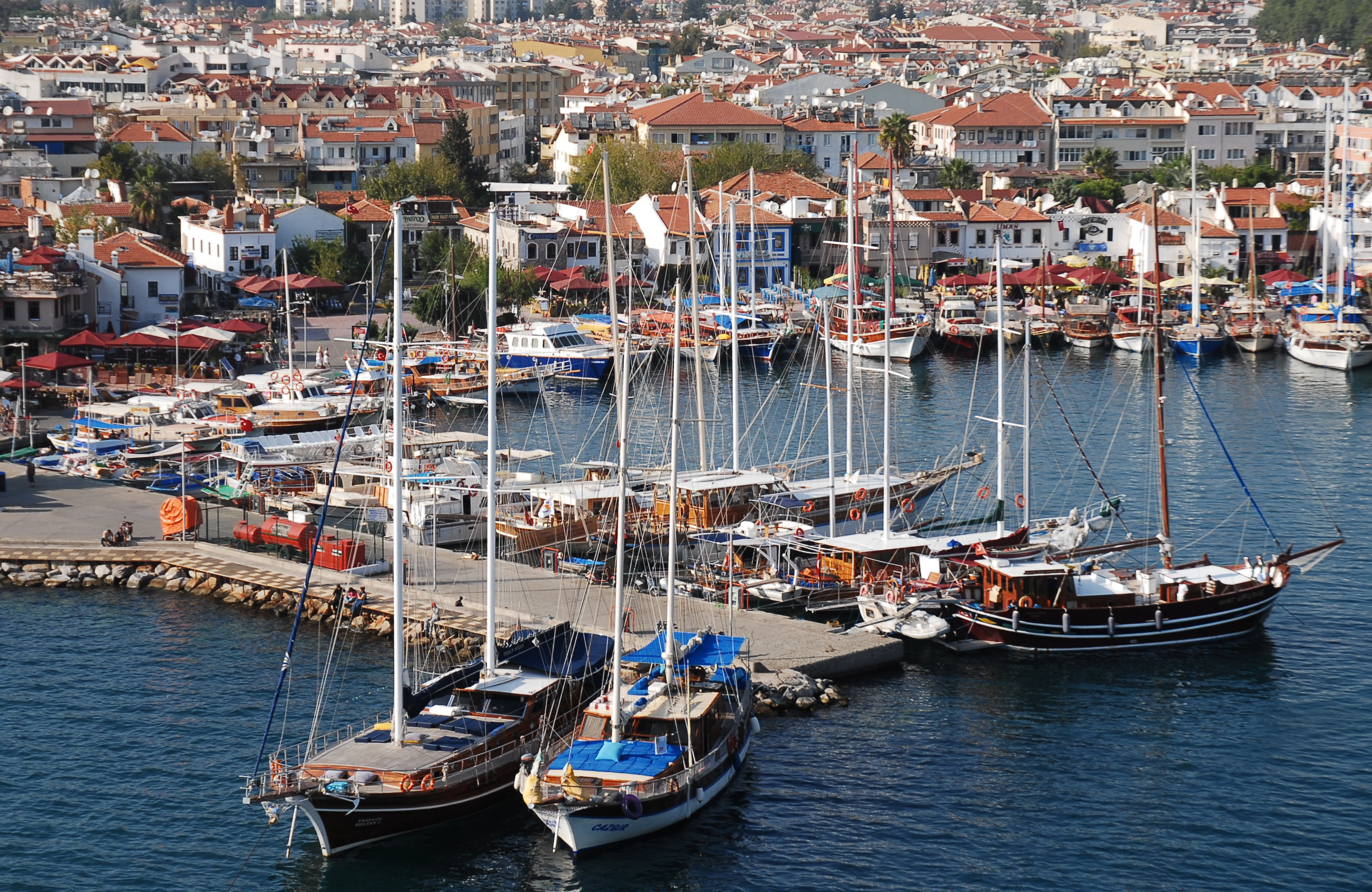
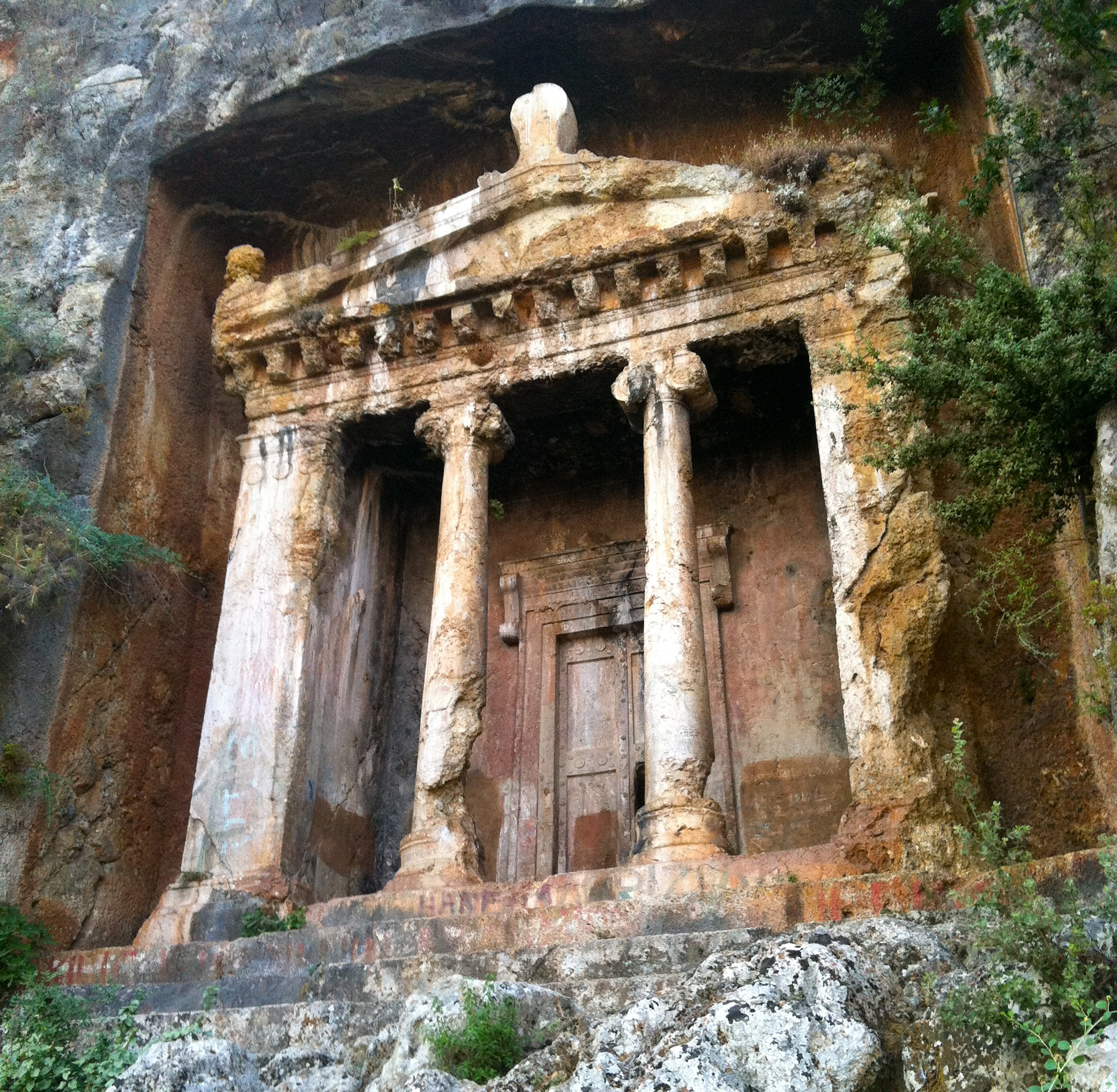
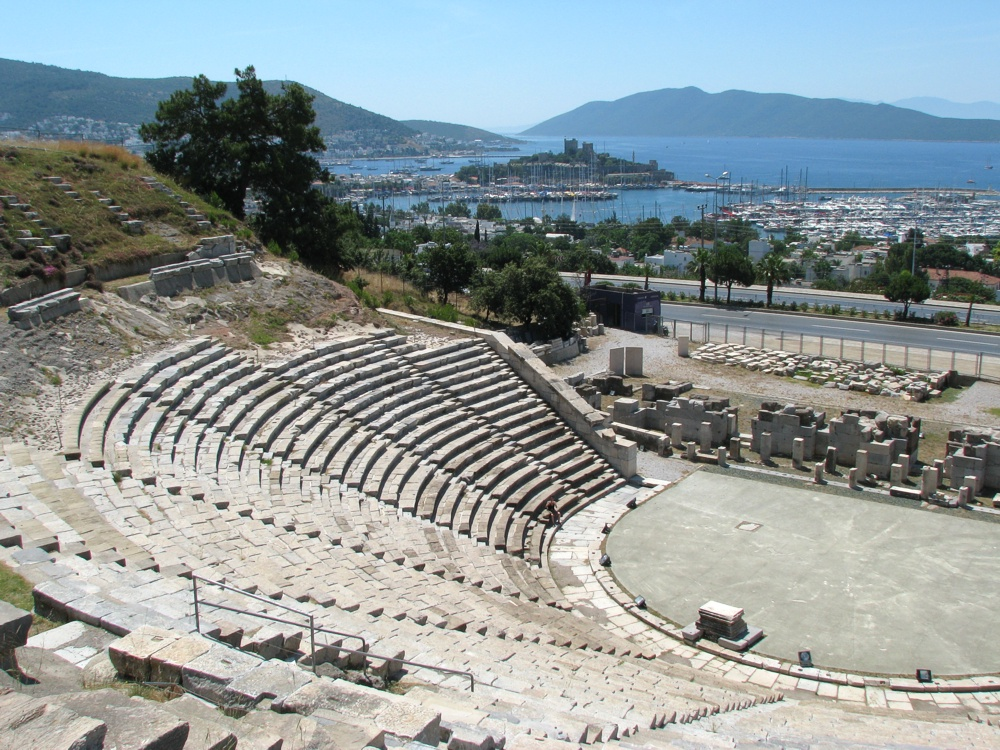
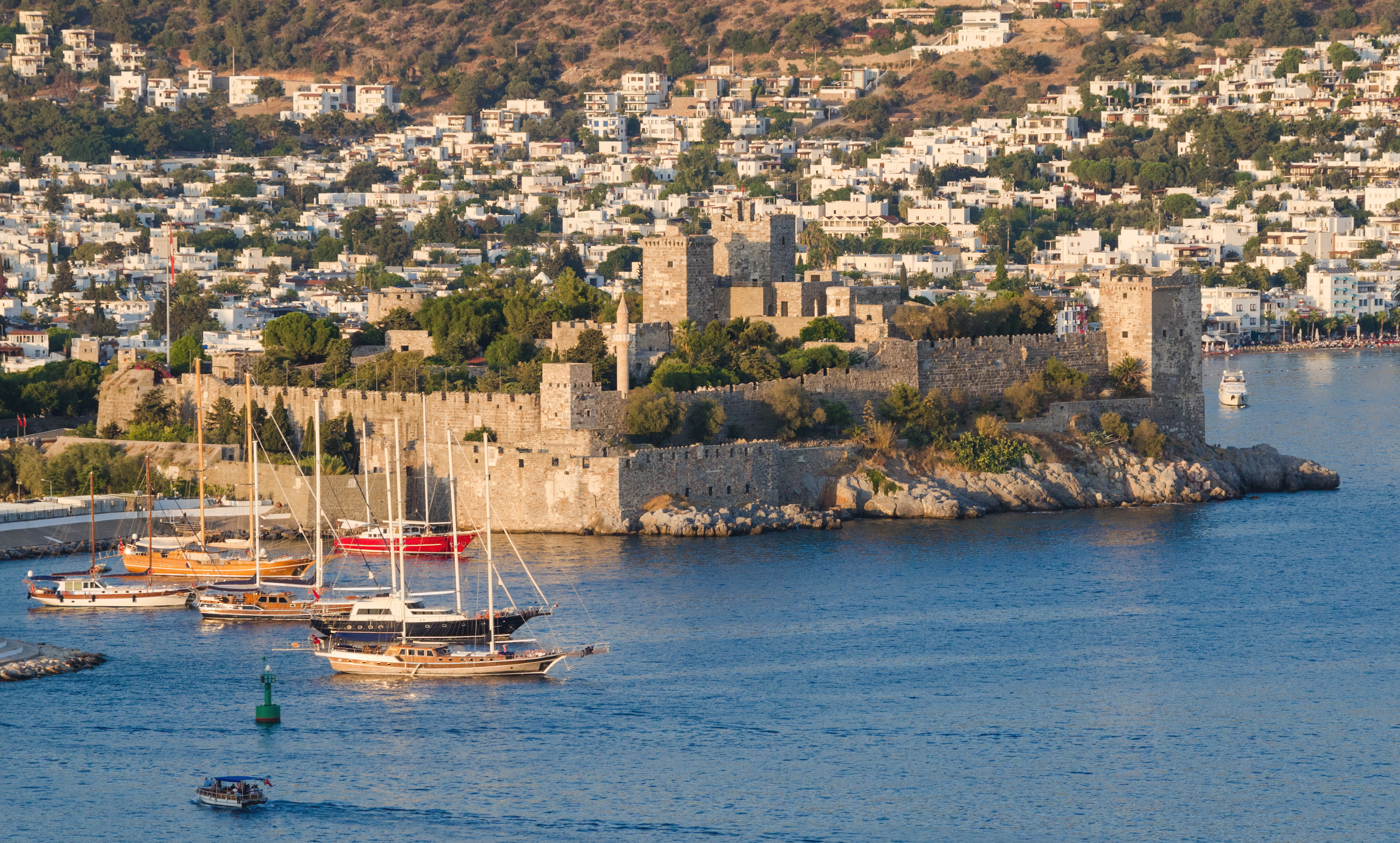
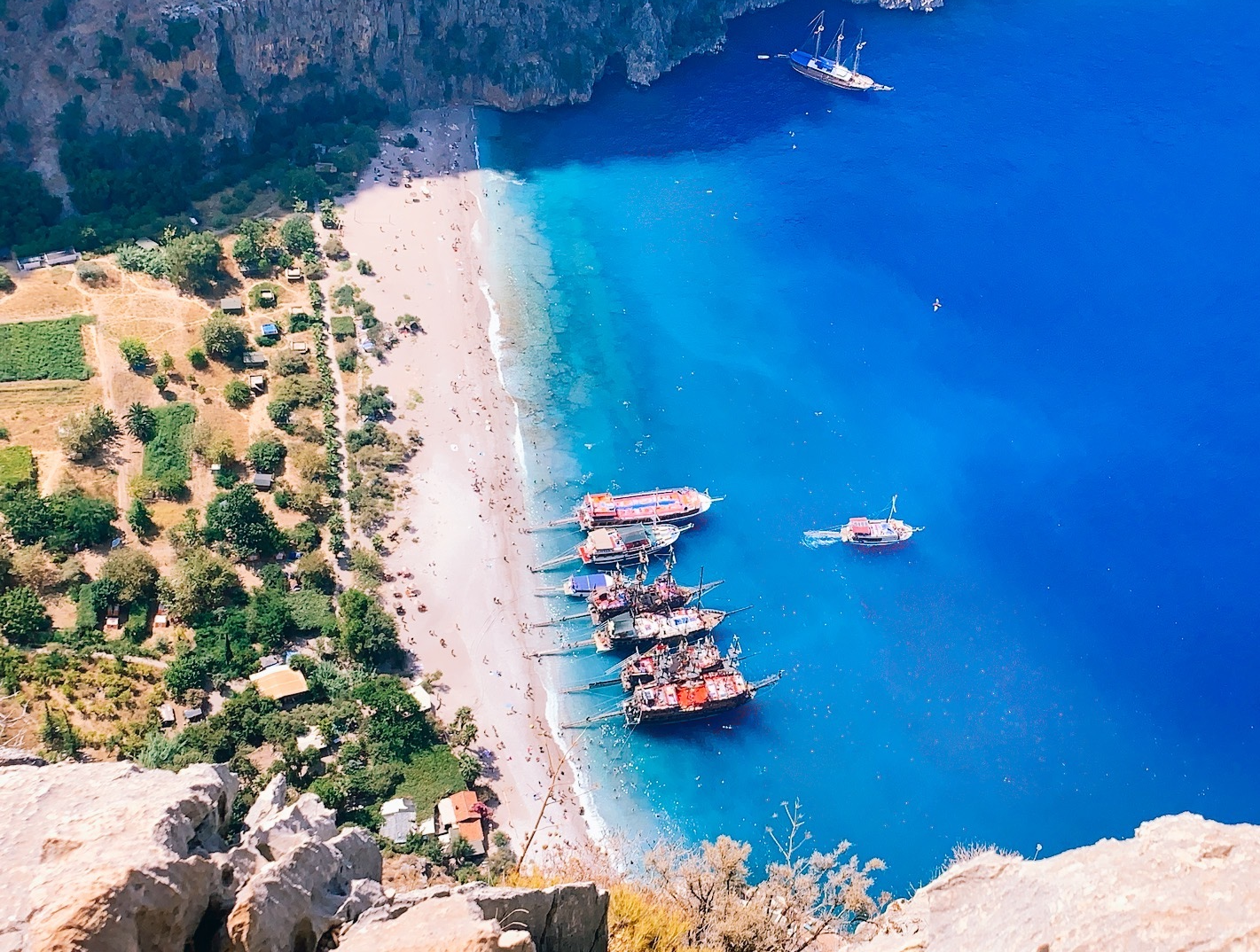
- Clockwise from top: Aerial view of Mugla, Marmaris Marina, Halicarnassus Theatre, Butterfly Valley, Bodrum Castle, Amyntas Rock Tombs, Ölüdeniz Beach

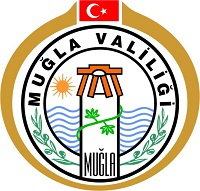
- Logo

- Location of the province within Turkey
- Country: Turkey
- Seat: Muğla

Government
  - Mayor: Ahmet Aras (CHP)
  - Vali: İdris Akbıyık
- Area: 12,654 km^{2} (4,886 sq mi)
- Population (2022): 1,048,185
  - Density: 82.834/km^{2} (214.54/sq mi)
- Time zone: UTC+3 (TRT)
- Area code: 0252
- Website: www.mugla.bel.tr www.mugla.gov.tr

Muğla Province (Turkish: Muğla ili, pronounced [muːɫa iˈli]) is a province and metropolitan municipality of Turkey, at the country's southwestern corner, on the Aegean Sea. Its area is 12,654 km^{2}, and its population is 1,048,185 (2022). Its seat is the city of Muğla, about 20 km (12 mi) inland, while some of Turkey's largest holiday resorts, such as Bodrum, Ölüdeniz, Marmaris and Fethiye, lie on the coast.

== Geography ==
At 1,100 km (680 mi), Muğla's coastline is the longest among the Provinces of Turkey and is home to the Datça Peninsula. As well as the sea, Muğla has two large lakes, Lake Bafa in the district of Milas and Lake Köyceğiz. The landscape consists of pot-shaped small plains surrounded by mountains, formed by depressions in the Neogene. These include the plain of the city of Muğla itself, Yeşilyurt, Ula, Gülağzı, Yerkesik, Akkaya, Çamköy and Yenice. Until the recent building of highways, transport from these plains to either the coast or inland was quite arduous, and thus each locality remained an isolated culture of its own. Contact with the outside world was through one of the three difficult passes: northwest to Milas, north to the Menderes plain through Gökbel, or northeast to Tavas.

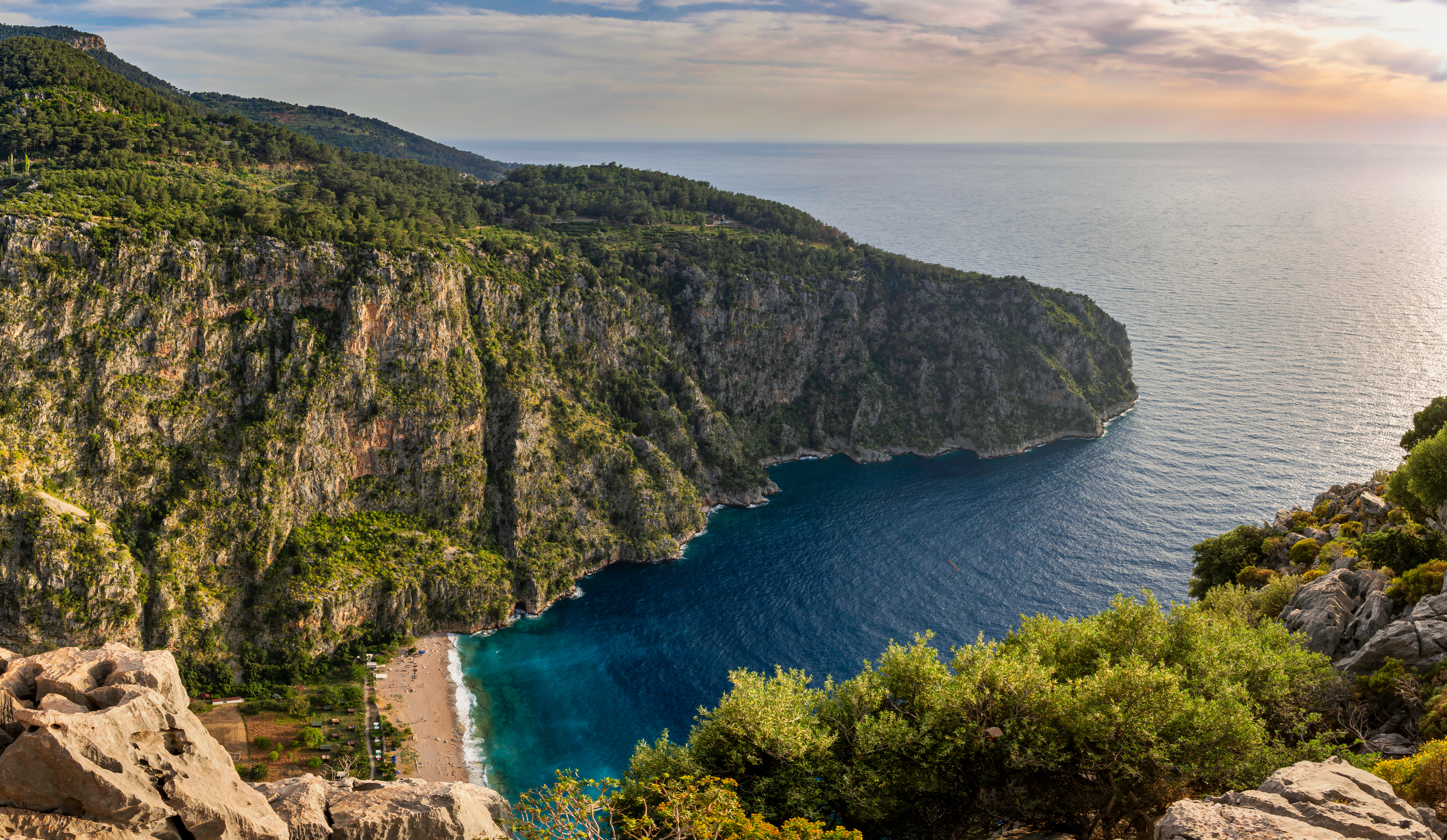
Butterfly Valley, Fethiye located in Muğla Province

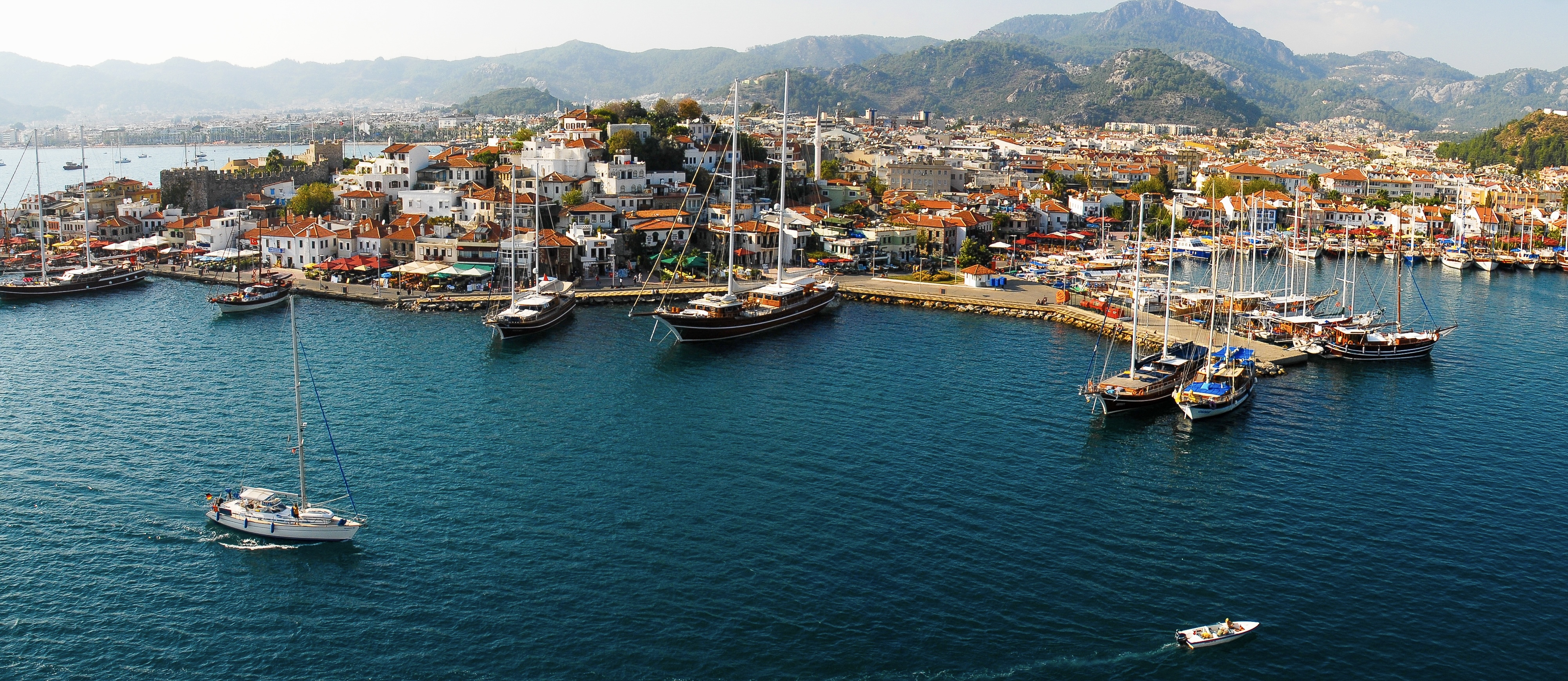
Marmaris located in Muğla Province

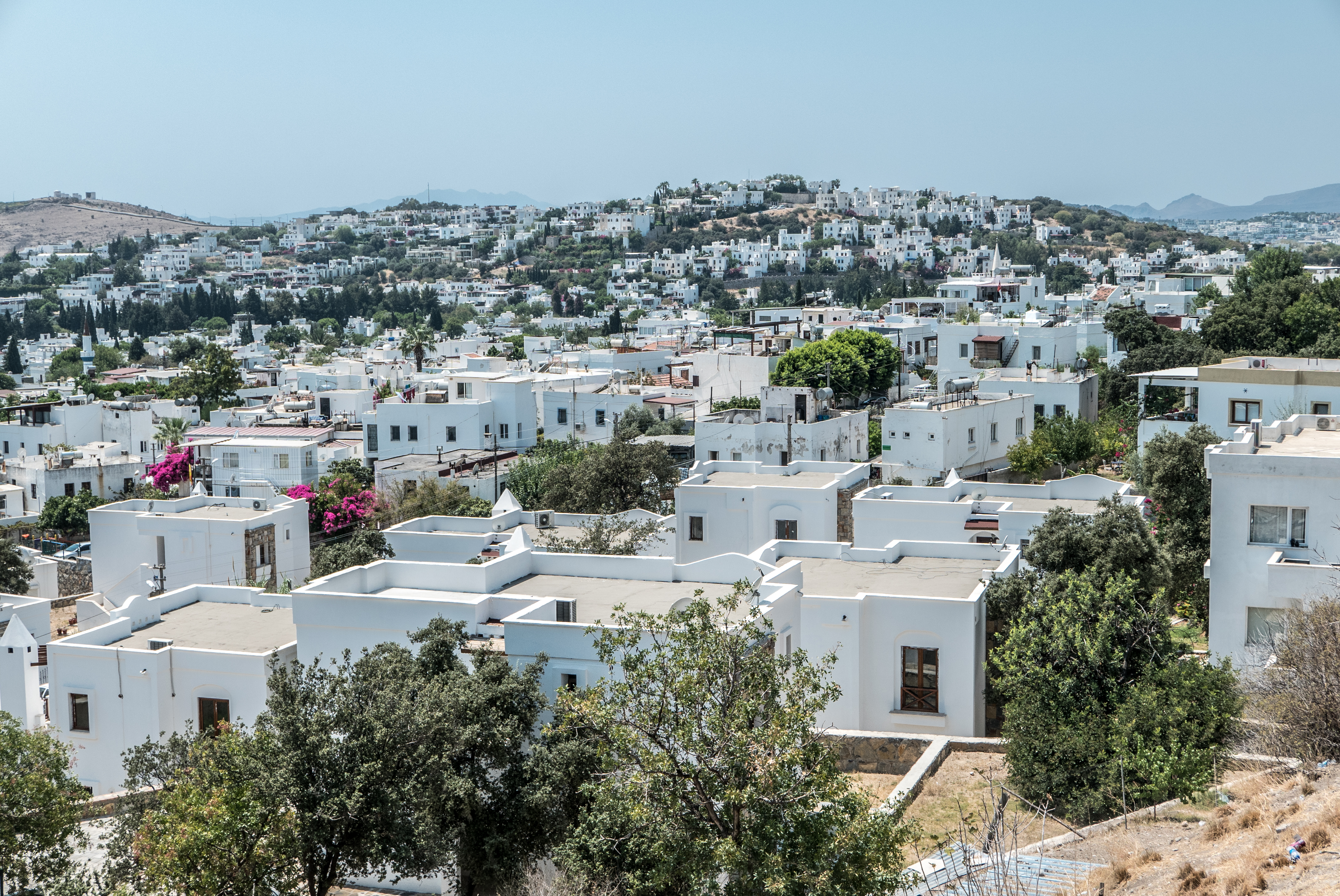
Bodrum located in Muğla Province

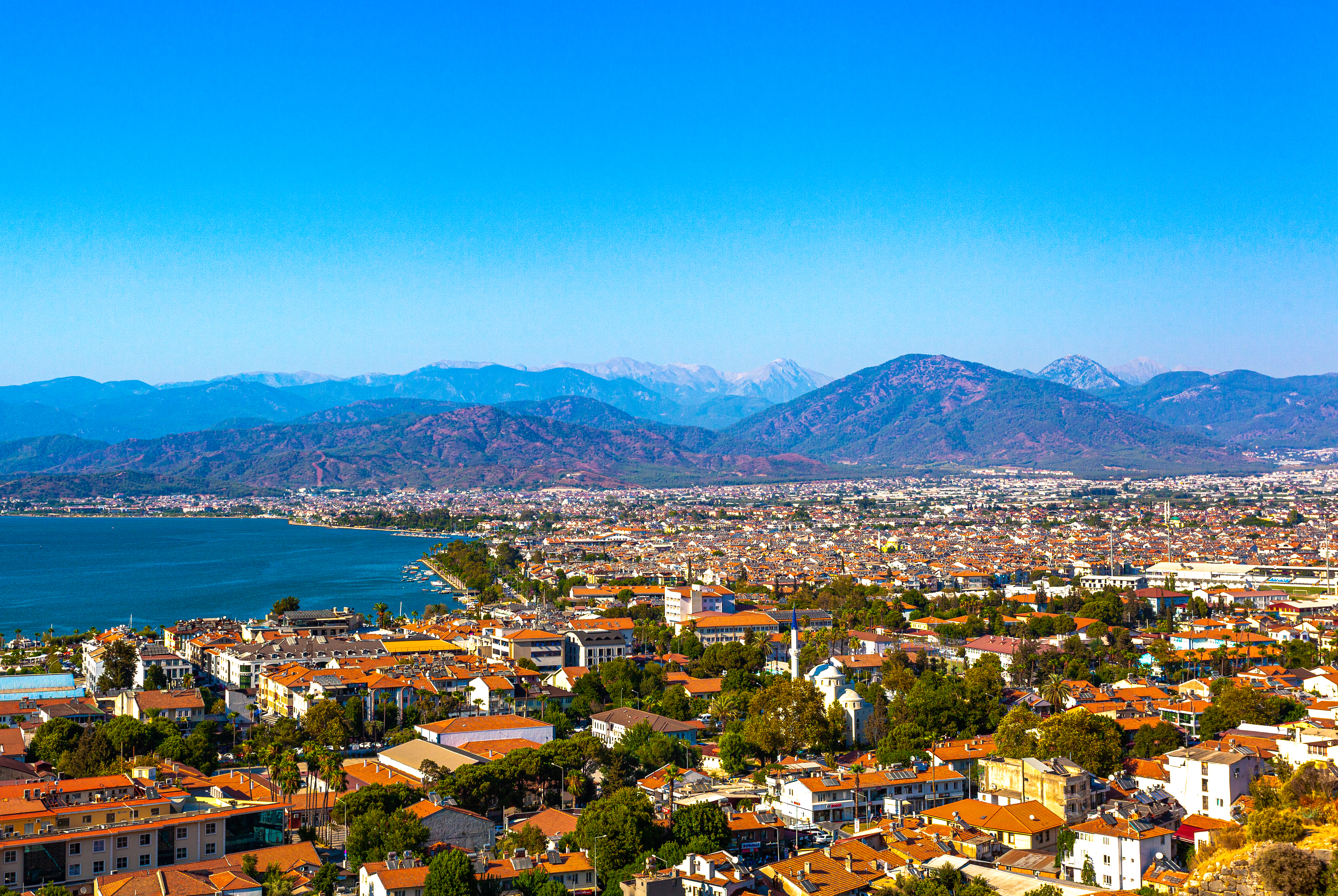
Fethiye located in Muğla Province

=== Environment ===
Despite court decisions upheld by the ECHR, as of 2020, the Yatağan, Yeniköy and Kemerköy coal-fired power stations continue operations as a major source of pollution in the area.

=== Transportation ===
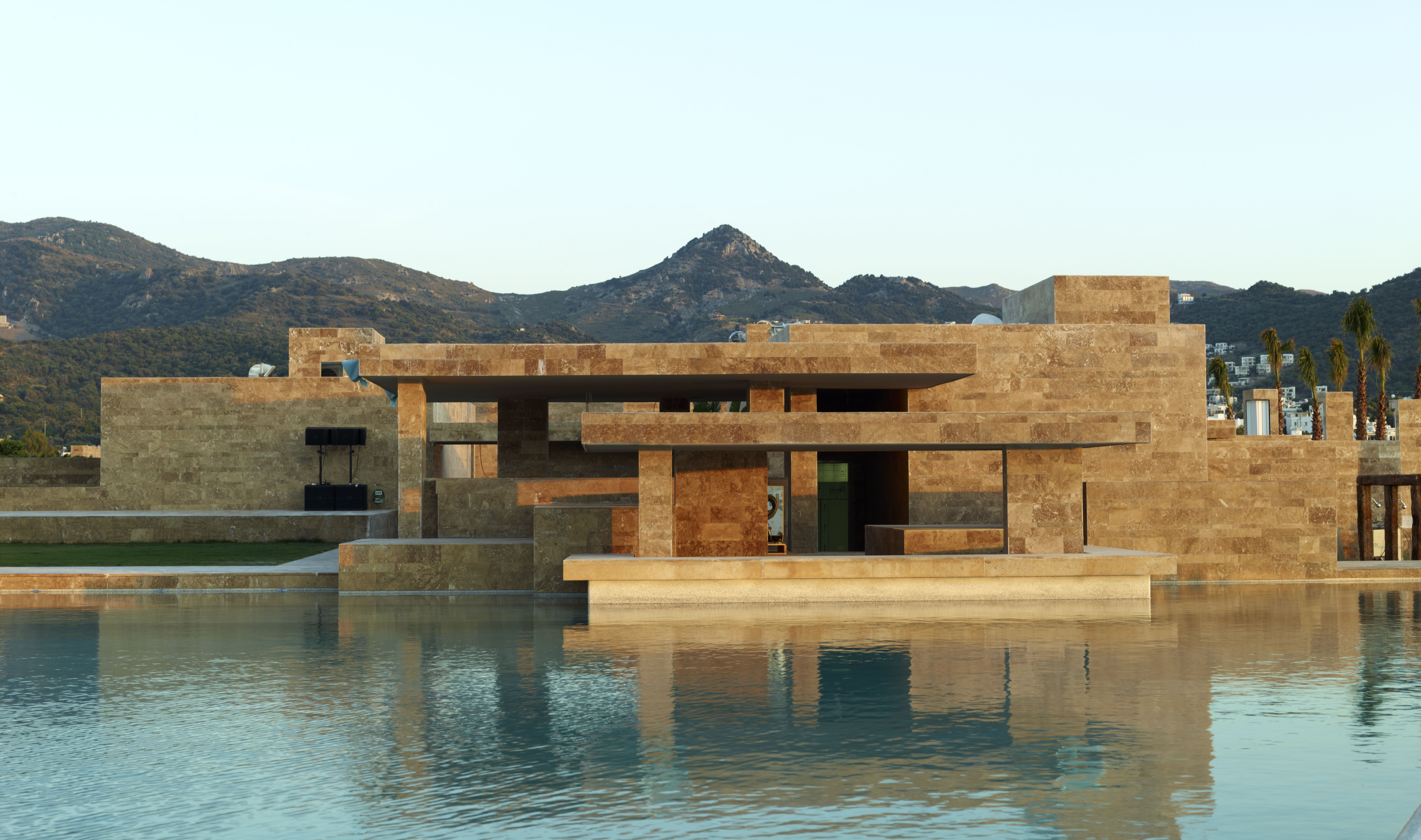
Yalikavak Marina

Muğla province is served by land, sea, and air connections. As a costal province, it is home to several marinas and ports.

- There are two airports in Dalaman and Milas-Bodrum, serving domestic and international flights and catering to the tourism industry.
- There are yacht marinas in Bodrum, Marmaris, Fethiye and Güllük.
- There are many privately run bus connections to İzmir, Antalya, Ankara, Istanbul and other major cities in Turkey both from Muğla and directly from the coastal resorts.

== History ==
In ancient Anatolia, the region between the Menderes and Dalaman rivers in the south was called Caria. Caria was inhabited by the eponymous Carians and the Leleges. In the Iliad, Homer described the Carians as natives of Anatolia, defending their country against the Greeks in joint campaigns in collaboration with the Trojans.

A major city of ancient Caria, Muğla is known to have been occupied by raiding parties of Egyptians, Assyrians and Scythians, until eventually the area was settled by Ancient Greek colonists. The Greeks inhabited this coast for a long time and built prominent cities, such as Knidos (at the end of the Datça Peninsula) and Bodrum (Halicarnassos), as well as many smaller towns along the coast of the Bodrum Peninsula and surrounding islands. In the district of Fethiye, ruins remain of the cities of Telmessos, Xanthos, Patara and Tlos. Eventually the coast was conquered by the Persians who were in turn removed by Alexander the Great, bringing an end to the satrapy of Caria.

In 1261, Menteshe Bey, founder of the Beylik (principality) that carried his name, with its capital in Milas and nearby Beçin, established his rule over the region of Muğla as well. The beys of Menteshe held the city until 1390 and were the first Turkish state in the region.

In 1390, Muğla was taken over by the Ottoman Empire. However, just twelve years later, Tamerlane and his forces defeated the Ottomans in the Battle of Ankara, and returned control of the region to its former rulers, the Menteshe Beys, as he did for other Anatolian beyliks. Muğla was brought back under Ottoman control by Sultan Mehmed II the Conqueror, in 1451. One of the most important events in the area during the Ottoman period was the well-recorded campaign of Suleiman the Magnificent against Rhodes, which was launched from Marmaris.

=== Archaeology ===
With this long history Muğla is rich in ancient ruins, with over 100 excavated sites including the UNESCO World Heritage Site of Letoon, near Fethiye.

In 2018, archaeologists unearthed a 2,300-year-old rock sepulchre of an ancient Greek boxer called Diagoras of Rhodes on a hill in the Turgut village, Muğla province, Marmaris. This unusual pyramid tomb was considered to belong to a holy person by the local people. The shrine, used as a pilgrimage by locals until the 1970s, also has the potential to be the only pyramid grave in Turkey. The excavation team also discovered an inscription with these words: "I will be vigilant at the very top so as to ensure that no coward can come and destroy this grave".

In July 2021, archaeologists led by Abuzer Kızıl have announced the discovery of two 2,500-year-old marble statues and an inscription during excavations at the Temple of Zeus Lepsynos in Euromus. According to Abuzer Kızıl, one of the statues was naked while other was wearing armor made of leather and a short skirt. Both of the statues were depicted with a lion in their hands.

== Gallery ==
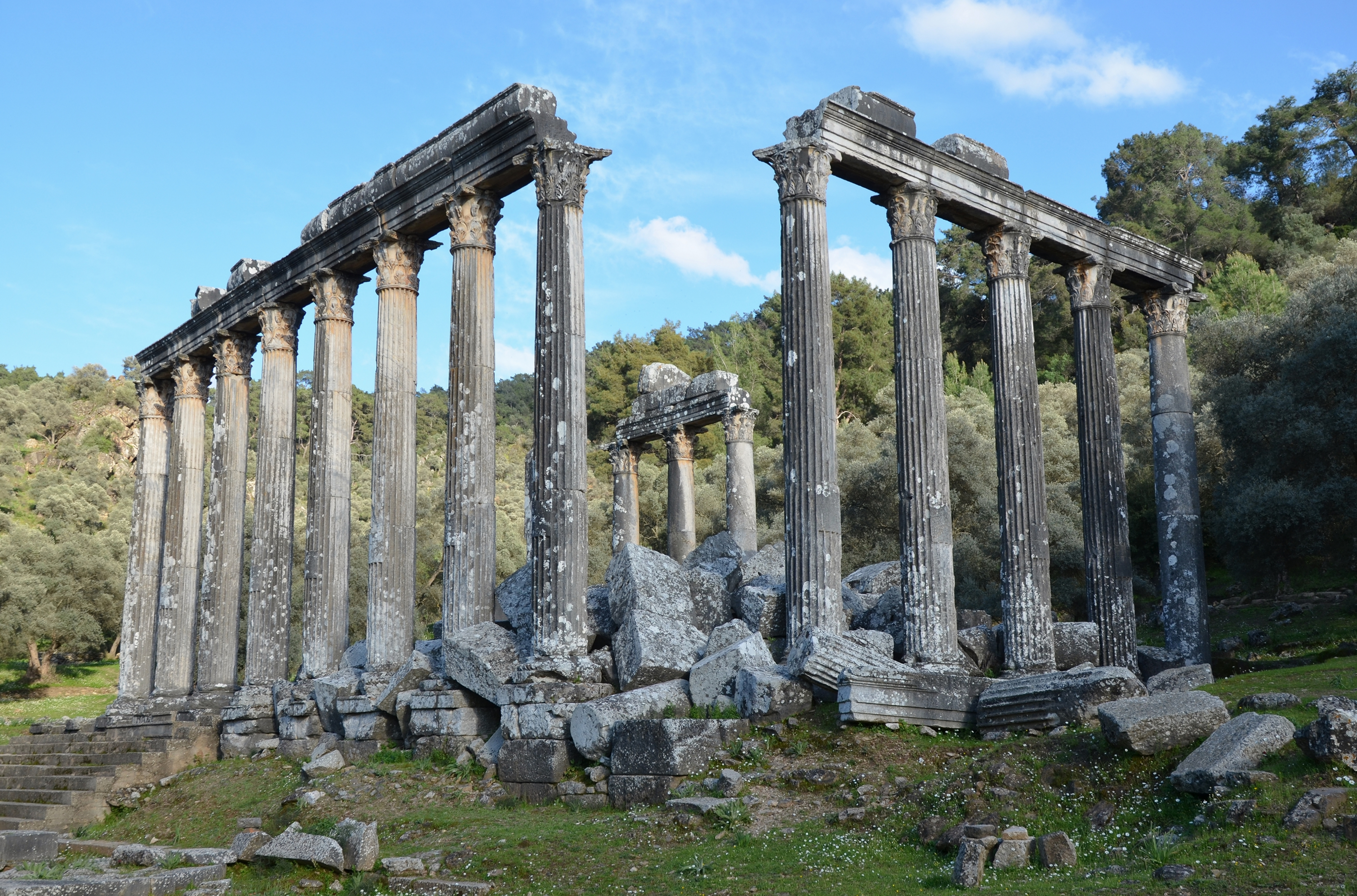
The Temple of Zeus Lepsynos, built on the site of an earlier Carian temple, 2nd century AD (probably during the reign of the emperor Hadrian), Euromos, Turkey.

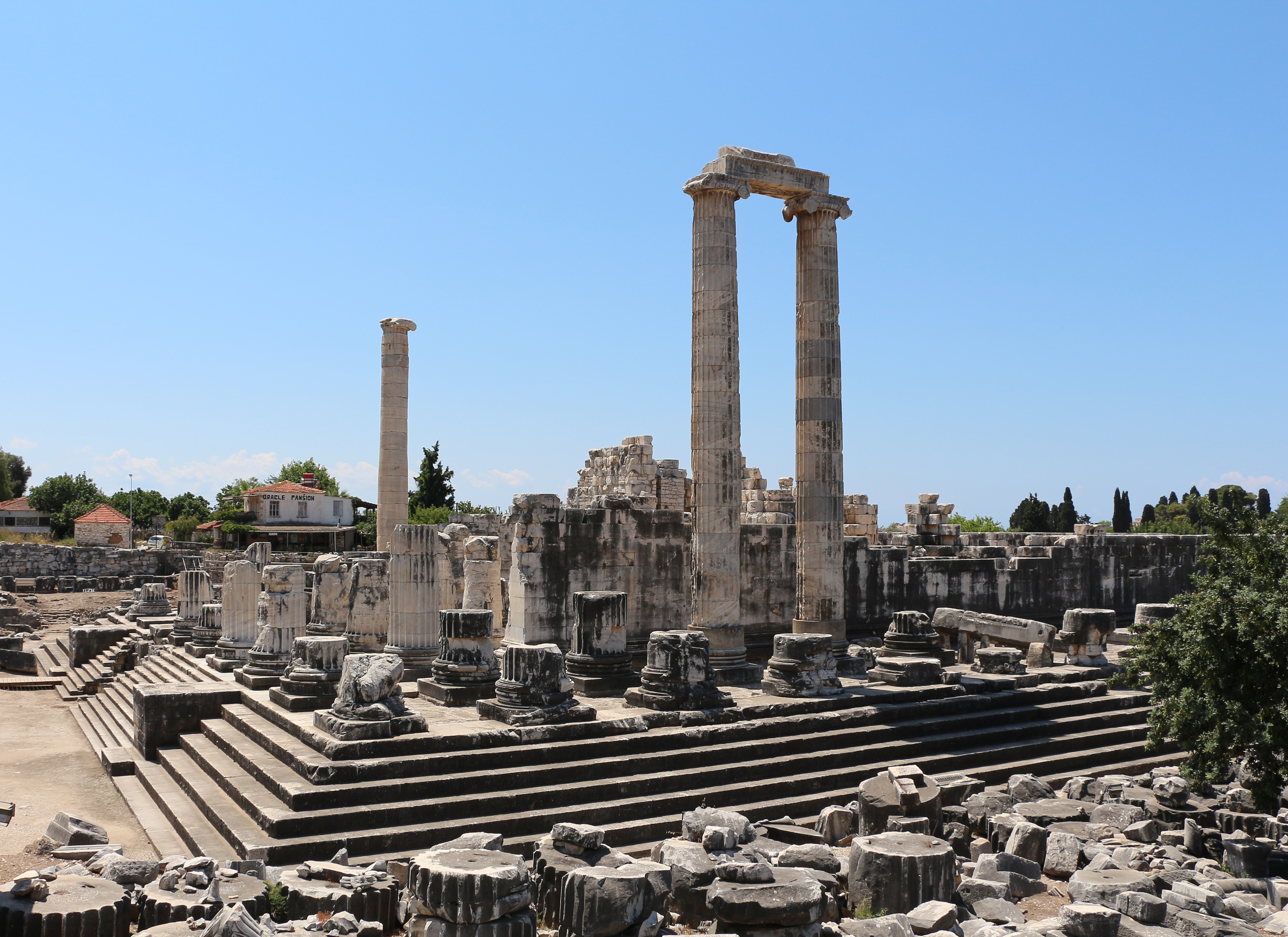
The Temple of Apollo in Didyma, Turkey.

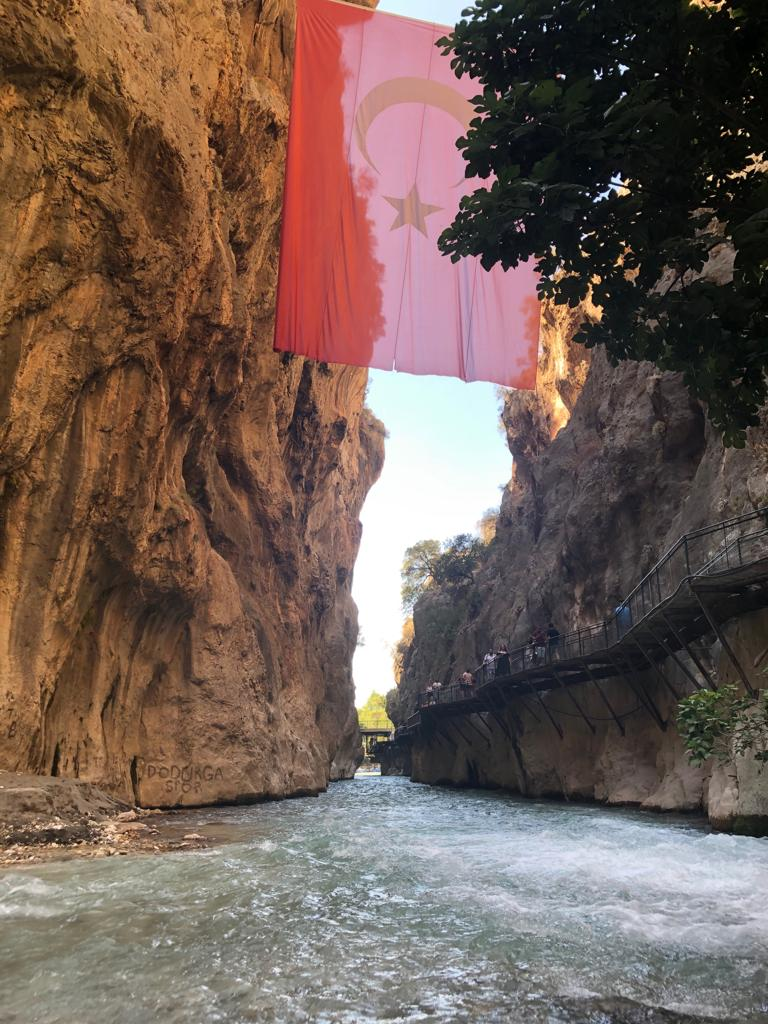
Saklıkent Canyon in Saklıkent National Park

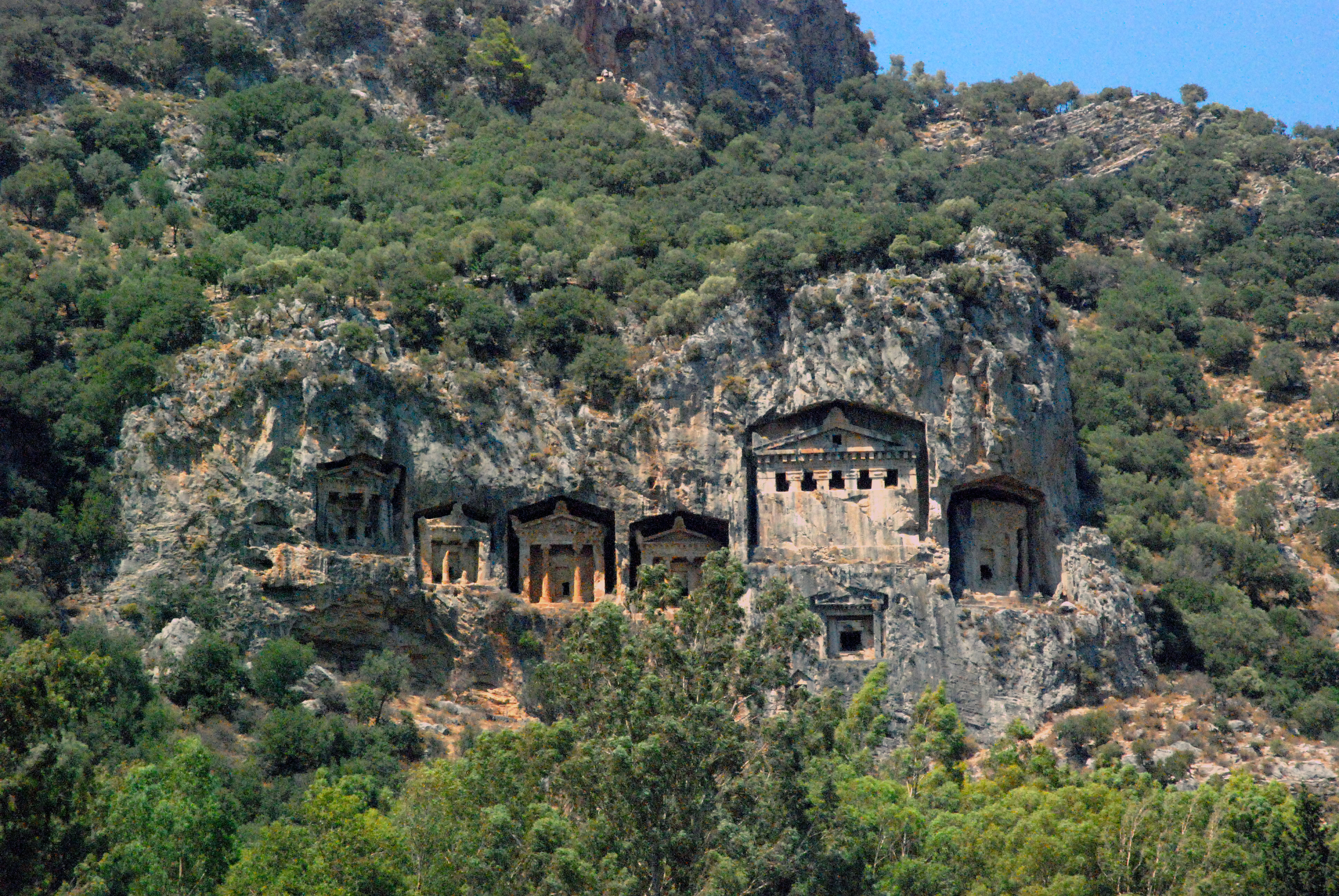
Lycian rock tombs in Dalyan

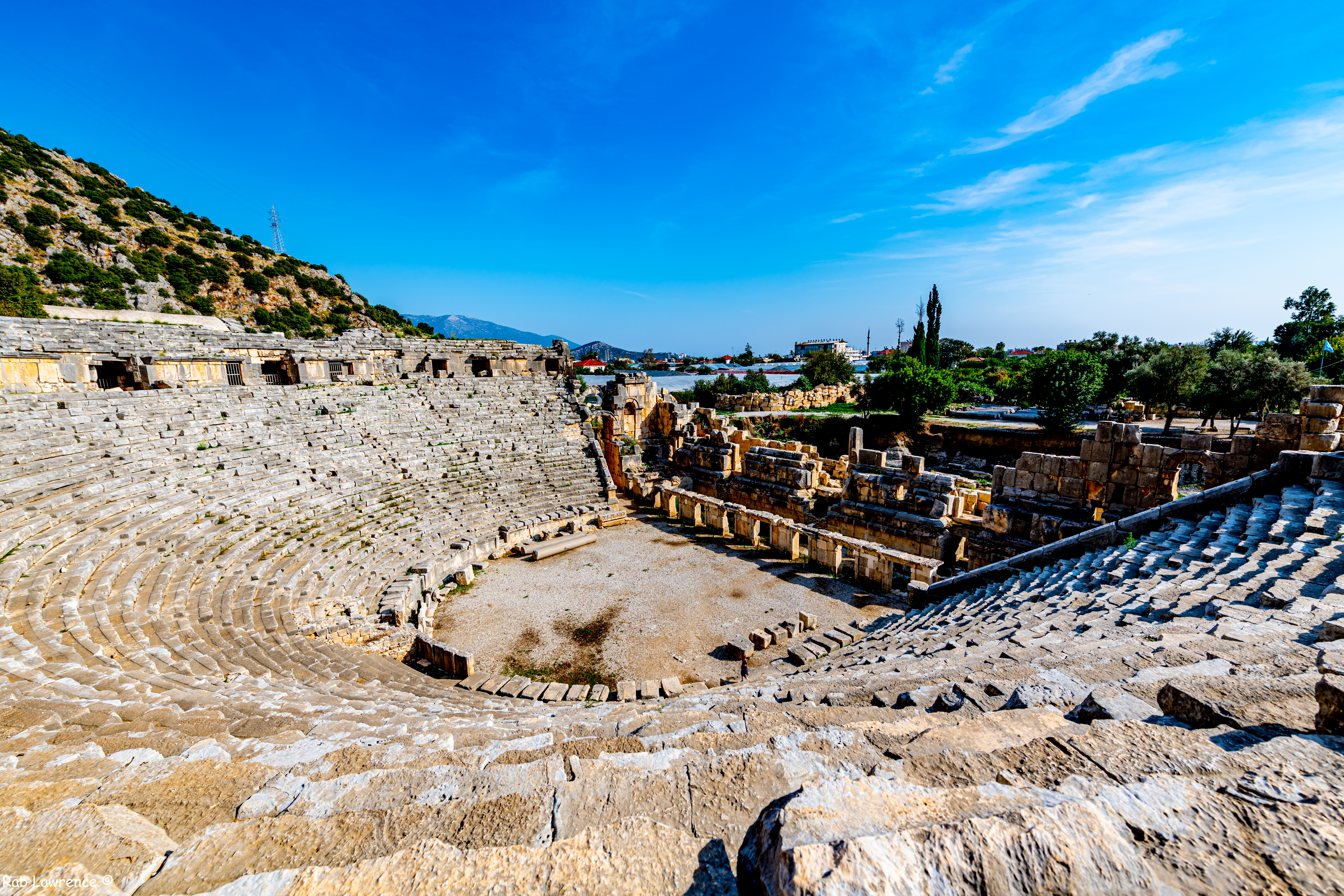
Theatre at Halicarnassus in Bodrum, with the Bodrum Castle in the background.

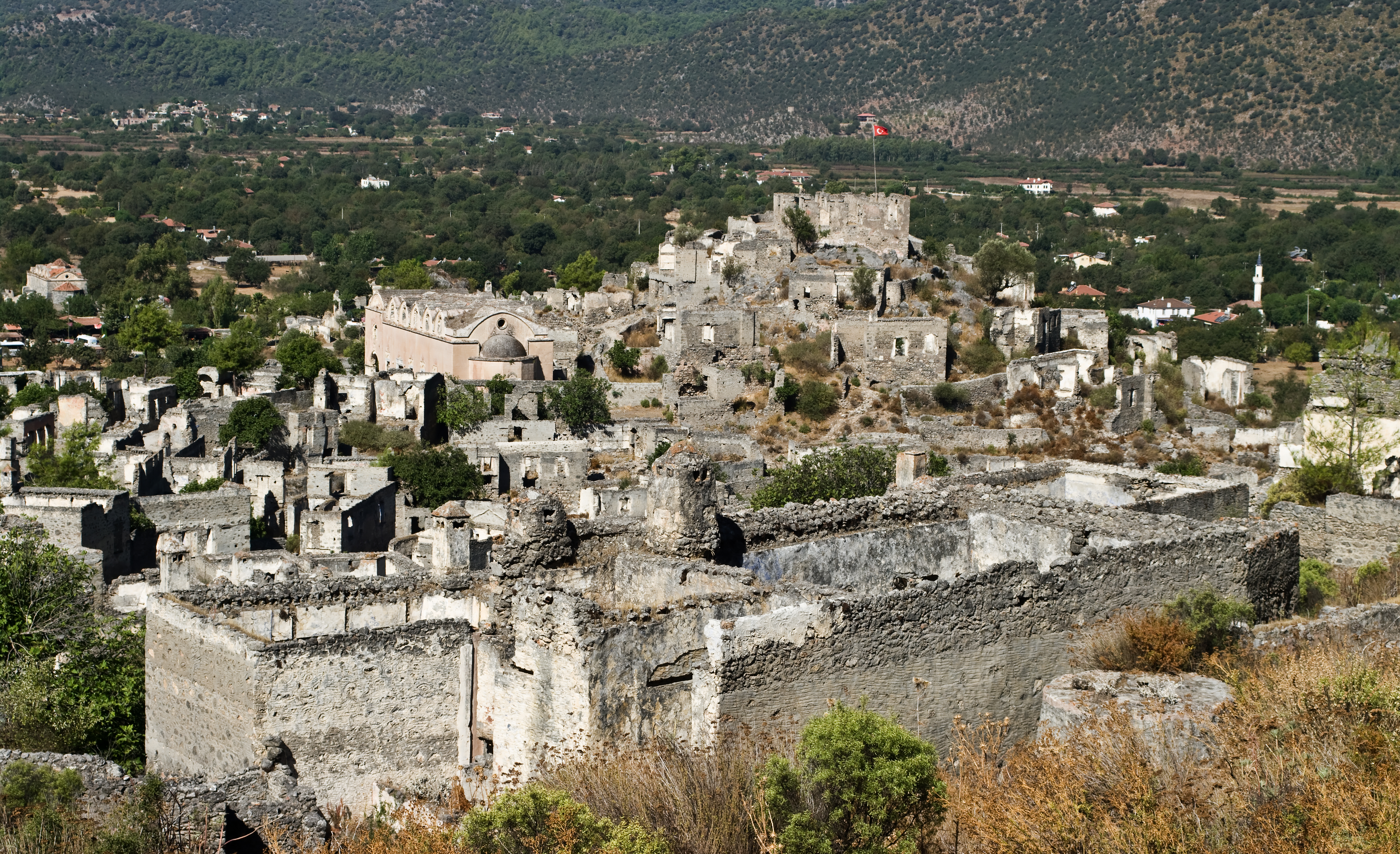
Kayaköy village founded by Greek Christians, now largely a ghost town near Fethiye.

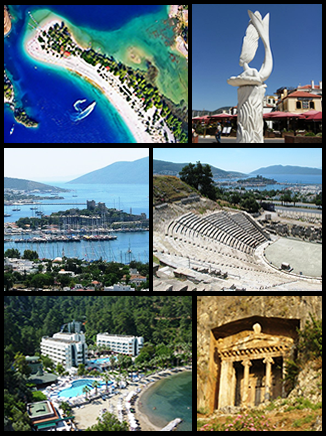
Montage of Mugla Province's monuments and sights

== Notable people ==
The following are notable residents of Muğla province:

- Herodotus of Halicarnassos, historian
- Turgut Reis, seaman
- Basil Zaharoff, arms dealer born in Muğla
- Osman Hamdi Bey, painter, had his summer residence in Yatağan.
- Şükrü Kaya, Minister of the Interior under Atatürk, born in İstanköy.
- Mustafa Muğlalı, general in the Turkish War of Independence.
- Yunus Nadi Abalıoğlu, founder of the Cumhuriyet newspaper and key supporter of Atatürk, from Fethiye.
- Zihni Derin, agriculturalist responsible for planting tea in the Eastern Black Sea region, from Muğla.
- Necati Çiller, father of Prime Minister Tansu Çiller, governor of Istanbul in the 1950s, from Milas.
- Cevat Şakir Kabaağaçlı, writer of The "Fisherman of Halicarnasoss" and his student Şadan Gökovalı
- Nail Çakırhan, architect of the Akyaka Çakırhan houses and winner of the Aga Khan Award for Architecture
- Janet Akyüz Mattei, amateur astronomer and president of the American Association of Variable Star Observers (AAVSO), of Bodrum.
- Zeki Müren, singer and fixture of the Bodrum nightclub scene for many years
- Poet Can Yücel is buried in Datça, his home in his final years
- Former president and general Kenan Evren lived in Marmaris after he retired until his death.

== Districts ==
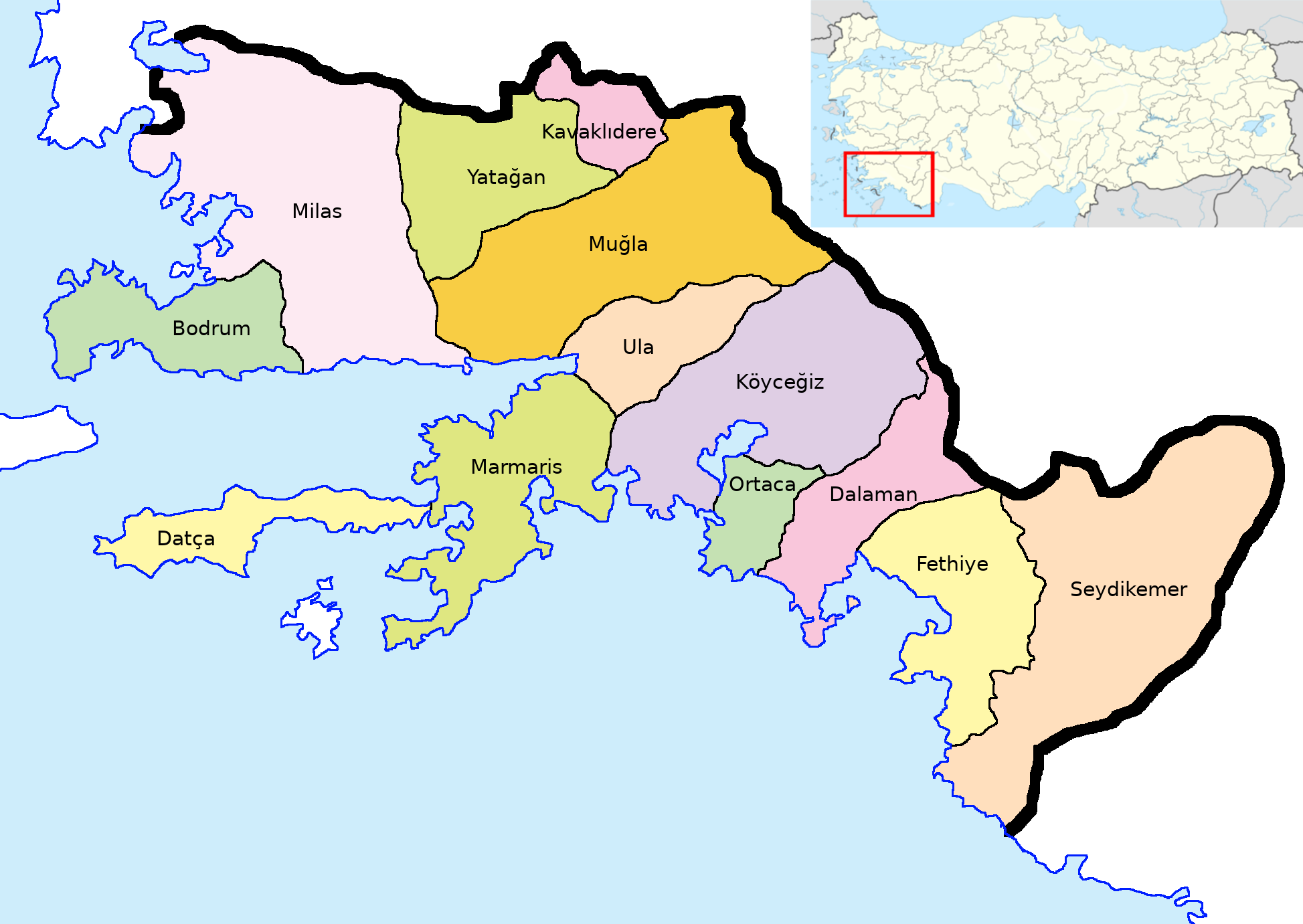

- Bodrum
- Dalaman
- Datça
- Fethiye
- Kavaklıdere
- Köyceğiz
- Marmaris
- Menteşe
- Milas
- Ortaca
- Seydikemer
- Ula
- Yatağan

=== Politics ===
The Republican People's Party (CHP), Turkey's principal center-left party has a traditionally strong presence across the political landscape of Muğla Province, closely followed by the traditional center-right represented by the Democrat Party (DP) in Turkey's politics. The incumbent Justice and Development Party (AKP) has enjoyed less support in the province.
