= Bayındır =

Municipality in Turkey

- District and municipality
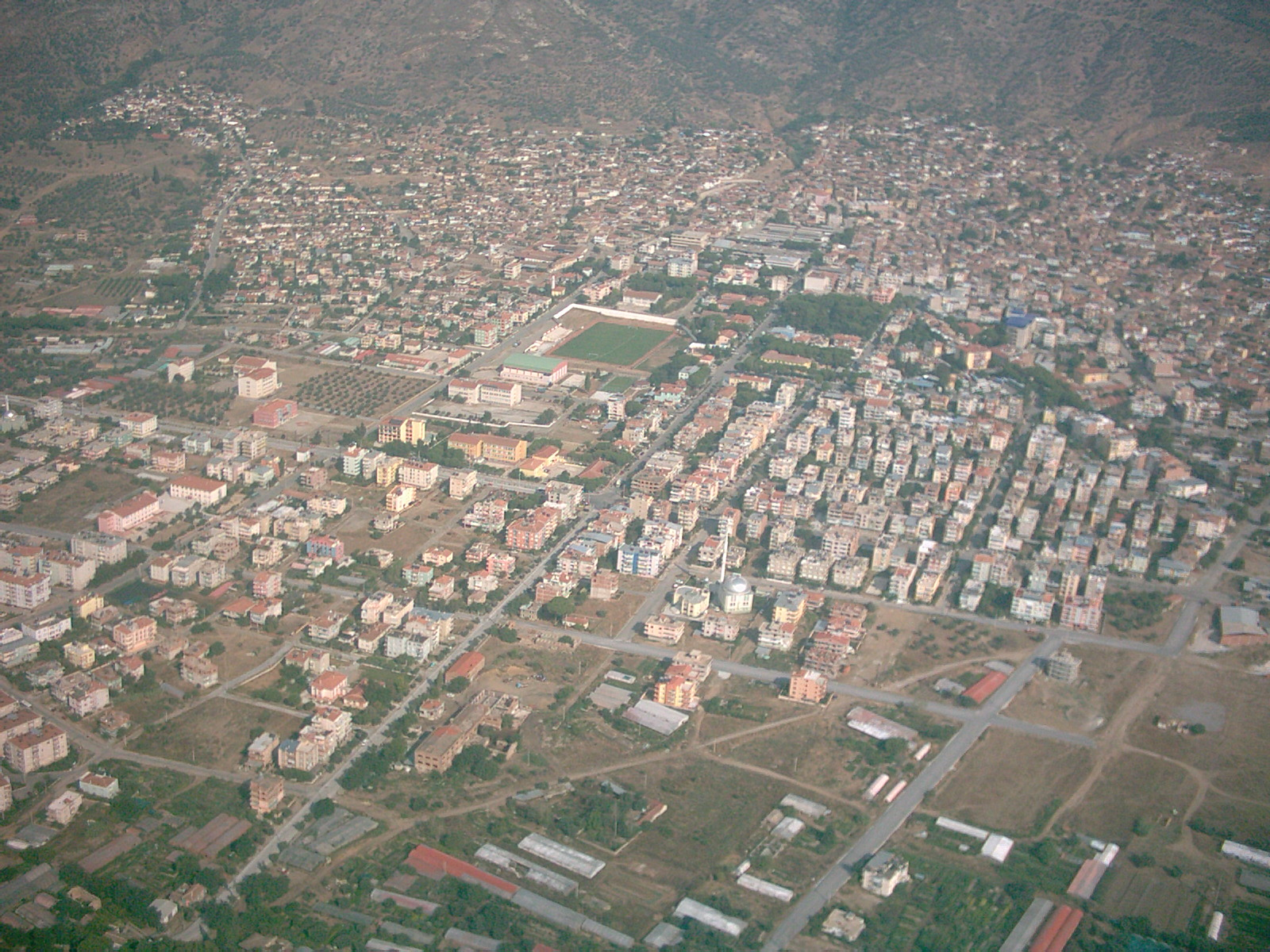

- Map showing Bayındır District in İzmir Province

- Location within Turkey Location within İzmir
- Coordinates: 38°13′09″N 27°38′53″E
- Country: Turkey
- Province: İzmir

Government
  - Mayor: Davut Sakarsu (CHP)
- Area: 548 km^{2} (212 sq mi)
- Population (2022): 40,073
  - Density: 73.1/km^{2} (189/sq mi)
- Time zone: UTC+3 (TRT)
- Postal code: 35840
- Area code: 0232
- Website: www.bayindir.bel.tr

Bayındır is a municipality and district of İzmir Province, Turkey. Its area is 548 km^{2}, and its population is 40,073 (2022). The central town of the district is situated in the valley of the Küçük Menderes.

== History ==
Its name in classical antiquity was Caystrus (Κάϋστρος), near Smyrna. Its present name derives from Turkish people who in the 11th c. AD settled there; they were members of the Bayındır clan, one of the 24 original Oghuz clans. From 1867 until 1922, Bayındır was part of the Aydin Vilayet of the Ottoman Empire. In 1997, the town population was 18,100. It is connected with İzmir by a branch of the Aydın railway, and has a trade in olives, olive oil, cotton, figs, raisins and tobacco.

== Composition ==
There are 59 neighbourhoods in Bayındır District:

- Alankıyı
- Alanköy
- Arıkbaşı
- Atatürk
- Balcılar
- Bıyıklar
- Buruncuk
- Cami
- Çamlıbel
- Çenikler
- Çiftçigediği
- Çınar
- Çınardibi
- Çırpı Cami
- Cumhuriyet
- Demircilik
- Dereköy
- Dernekli
- Elifli
- Ergenli
- Fatih
- Fırınlı
- Gaziler
- Hacıbeşir
- Hacıibrahim
- Hasköy
- Hatay
- Havuzbaşı
- Hisarlık
- İbrahimçavuş
- Kabaağaç
- Karahalilli
- Karahayit
- Karapınar
- Karaveliler
- Kızılcaağaç
- Kızılcaova
- Kızılkeçili
- Kızıloba
- Kurt
- Lütuflar
- Mektep
- Mitatpaşa
- Necati Uza
- Orta
- Osmanlar
- Pınarlı
- Sadıkpaşa
- Sarıyurt
- Söğütören
- Tokatbaşı
- Turan
- Yakacık
- Yakapınar
- Yeni
- Yenice
- Yeşilova
- Yusuflu
- Zeytinova

== Transport ==
The district is crossed by the Torbalı-Tire railway, with a branch to Ödemiş. It is served by regional trains from/to İzmir (Basmane-Ödemiş and Basmane-Tire), and counts the stations of Arıkbaşı, Karpuzlu, Elifli, Furunlu, Bayındır (in the capital town), Yakaköy and Çatal.
