= Bayındır (disambiguation) =

Bayındır is a district of İzmir Province, Turkey.

Bayındır may also refer to:

== People ==
- Altay Bayındır (born 1998), Turkish footballer
- Sevahir Bayındır (born 1969), Turkish politician

== Places ==
- Bayındır Dam, a dam in Ankara Province, Turkey
- Bayındır railway station, a railway station in Bayındır, Turkey
- Bayındır, Aksaray, a village in the district of Aksaray, Aksaray Province
- Bayındır, Bismil
- Bayındır, Burdur
- Bayındır, Büyükorhan
- Bayındır, Çamlıdere, a village in the district of Çamlıdere, Ankara Province
- Bayındır, Çankırı
- Bayındır, Çat
- Bayındır, Çerkeş
- Bayındır, Elmalı, a village in the district of Elmalı, Antalya Province
- Bayındır, Göynük, a village in the district of Göynük, Bolu Province
- Bayındır, İznik
- Bayındır, Keban
- Bayındır, Kastamonu, a village in the district of Kastamonu, Kastamonu Province
- Bayındır, Kaş, a village in the district of Kaş, Antalya Province
- Bayındır, Mecitözü
- Bayındır, Nazilli, a village in the district of Nazilli, Aydın Province
- Bayındır, Pazaryolu
- Bayındır, Silifke, a village in Silifke district of Mersin Province

== See also ==
- Bayandur (tribe), also known as Bayındır
