= Furunlu railway station =

Furunlu

General information
- Location: Bayındır, İzmir Province; Turkey
- Coordinates: 38°11′43″N 27°36′16″E
- System: TCDD regional rail station
- Owner: Turkish State Railways
- Lines: TCDD Taşımacılık: Basmane-Ödemiş Regional
- Platforms: 1 island platform
- Tracks: 1

Construction
- Structure type: At-grade

Other information
- Status: In Operation

History
- Opened: January 2014; 12 years ago

Services
| Preceding station | TCDD Taşımacılık | Following station |
|---|---|---|
| Elifli towards İzmir (Basmane) | İzmir–Ödemiş | Bayındır towards Ödemiş Şehir |
| Elifli towards İzmir (Basmane) | İzmir–Tire | Bayındır towards Tire |
Location

Furunlu station (Turkish: Furunlu İstasyonu) is a railway station in the village of Furunlu in Bayındır, İzmir Province, Turkey. It consists of a single platform servicing one track. TCDD Taşımacılık operates 5 daily trains, in each direction, from İzmir to Ödemiş.
