= Buca Belediyesi (İzmir Metro) =

General information
- Location: Menderes Cd., Vali Rahmi Bey Mah., 35370; Buca
- Coordinates: 38.390965°N 27.159009°E
- System: İzmir Metro rapid transit station
- Owner: İzmir Metropolitan Municipality
- Operator: İzmir Metro A.Ş.
- Line: M2
- Tracks: 2

Construction
- Accessible: Yes

History
- Opened: 2027; 1 year's time (expected)

Services
Preceding station	İzmir Metro	Following station
Future service
Şirinyer towards Üçyol	M2	Çevik Bir Meydanı towards Fuar İzmir
Location

Buca Belediyesi is a proposed underground station on the Üçyol—Fuar İzmir Line of the İzmir Metro. It will be located beneath Menderes Avenue Buca. Construction of the station, along with the metro line, began in 2024. The station will be located in front of the Buca Tax Administration and one block west of the Buca Municipality building.
