= Arıkbaşı railway station =

Arıkbaşı

General information
- Location: Çırpı İstasyon Sk., Arıkbaşı 35840, Bayındır, İzmir; Turkey
- Coordinates: 38.1780°N 27.4967°E
- System: TCDD regional rail station
- Owner: Turkish State Railways
- Operator: Turkish State Railways
- Lines: Basmane-Ödemiş Regional; Basmane-Tire Regional
- Platforms: 1
- Tracks: 1

Other information
- Status: Operational

History
- Opened: 1 September 1883; 143 years ago

Services
Preceding station	TCDD Taşımacılık	Following station
Taşkesik towards İzmir (Basmane)	İzmir–Ödemiş	Karpuzlu towards Ödemiş Şehir
Torbalı towards İzmir (Basmane)	İzmir–Tire	Karpuzlu towards Tire
Location

Arıkbaşı railway station is a railway station located just south of the village of Arıkbaşı, Turkey on the Torbalı-Ödemiş railway. The Turkish State Railways operates two regional rail services from İzmir to Ödemiş and Tire with ten daily trains in each direction. The station was built in 1883 by the Oriental Railway Company and taken over by the state railways in 1935. Arıkbaşı is 62.6 km (38.9 mi) southeast of Basmane Terminal in İzmir.
