= Hasanağa Bahçesi (İzmir Metro) =

General information
- Location: Erdem Cd., Adatepe Mah., 35160; Buca
- Coordinates: 38.3825°N 27.183333°E
- System: İzmir Metro rapid transit station
- Owner: İzmir Metropolitan Municipality
- Operator: İzmir Metro A.Ş.
- Line: M2
- Tracks: 2

Construction
- Accessible: Yes

History
- Opened: 2027; 1 year's time (expected)

Services
Preceding station	İzmir Metro	Following station
Future service
Çevik Bir Meydanı towards Üçyol	M2	D.E.Ü. Tınaztepe Kampüsü towards Fuar İzmir
Location

Hasanağa Bahçesi is a proposed underground station on the Üçyol—Fuar İzmir Line of the İzmir Metro. It will be located beneath Erdem Avenue in Buca. Construction of the station, along with the metro line, began in 2024.

== Nearby places of interest ==
- Hasanağa Bahçesi
- Old Buca Cemetery
