= Karpuzlu railway station =

Karpuzlu

General information
- Location: Park Cd., Cumhuriyet Mah. 35847, Bayındır, İzmir, Turkey
- Coordinates: 38°11′01″N 27°33′24″E
- System: TCDD regional rail station
- Owner: Turkish State Railways
- Lines: Turkish State Railways; İzmir–Ödemiş Regional; İzmir–Tire Regional
- Platforms: 1
- Tracks: 1

Other information
- Status: Operational

History
- Opened: 1 September 1883; 143 years ago

Services
Preceding station	TCDD Taşımacılık	Following station
Arıkbaşı towards İzmir (Basmane)	İzmir–Ödemiş	Elifli towards Ödemiş Şehir
Arıkbaşı towards İzmir (Basmane)	İzmir–Tire	Elifli towards Tire
Location

Karpuzlu railway station is a stop on the Torbalı–Ödemiş railway. The Turkish State Railways operates two regional services from İzmir to Ödemiş and Tire with ten daily trains in each direction. Karpuzlu was built in 1883 by the Oriental Railway Company and taken over by the state railways in 1935. The station is 67.9 km (42.2 mi) from Basmane Terminal in İzmir.
