= Buca Koop. (İzmir Metro) =

General information
- Location: 1401 Sk. Buca Koop. Mah., 35160; Buca
- Coordinates: 38.369574°N 27.184939°E
- System: İzmir Metro rapid transit station
- Owner: İzmir Metropolitan Municipality
- Operator: İzmir Metro A.Ş.
- Line: M2
- Tracks: 2

Construction
- Accessible: Yes

History
- Opened: 2027; 1 year's time (expected)

Services
Preceding station	İzmir Metro	Following station
Future service
D.E.Ü. Tınaztepe Kampüsü towards Üçyol	M2	Çamlıkule towards Fuar İzmir
Location

Buca Koop., is a proposed underground station on the Üçyol—Fuar İzmir Line of the İzmir Metro. It will be located beneath 1401 Street in southeast Buca. Construction of the station, along with the metro line, began in 2024. Buca Koop. was the original eastern terminus of the line until August 2016, when the line was extended one station further to Çamlıkule.
