= Çatal railway station =

Railway station in Bayındır, Turkey

Çatal
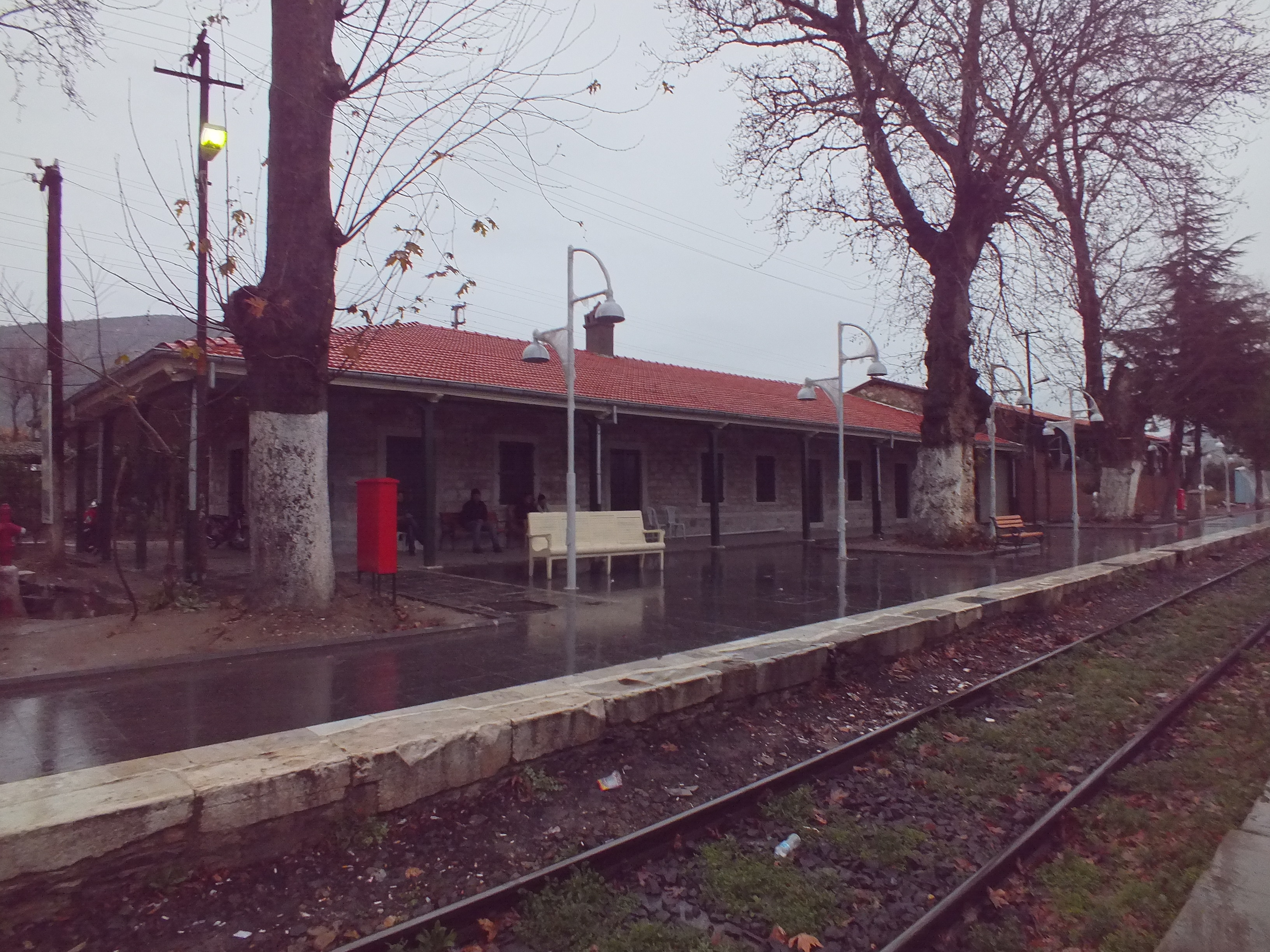

General information
- Location: Bayındır District, İzmir Province; Turkey
- Coordinates: 38°10′20.4″N 27°43′14.5″E
- System: TCDD regional rail station
- Owner: Turkish State Railways
- Line: Torbalı-Tire
- Platforms: 2
- Tracks: 3

Construction
- Structure type: At-grade
- Platform levels: 1

Other information
- Status: In Operation

History
- Opened: 1 September 1883; 143 years ago
- Former names: Oriental Railway Company

Services
Preceding station	TCDD Taşımacılık	Following station
Yakaköy towards İzmir (Basmane)	İzmir–Ödemiş	Pınarlı towards Ödemiş Şehir
Bayındır towards İzmir (Basmane)	İzmir–Tire	Tire Toki Mahallesi towards Tire
Terminus	Tire–Çatal	Tire Terminus
Location

Çatal station (Turkish: Çatal Garı) is a railway station on the Torbalı-Ödemiş railway, located in the district of Bayındır, Turkey. Çatal (English: Fork) is named for the junction just east of the station where the Çatal-Tire railway branches off.
