= Gaziemir railway station =

Railway station in Gaziemir, İzmir, Turkey

GAZİEMİR
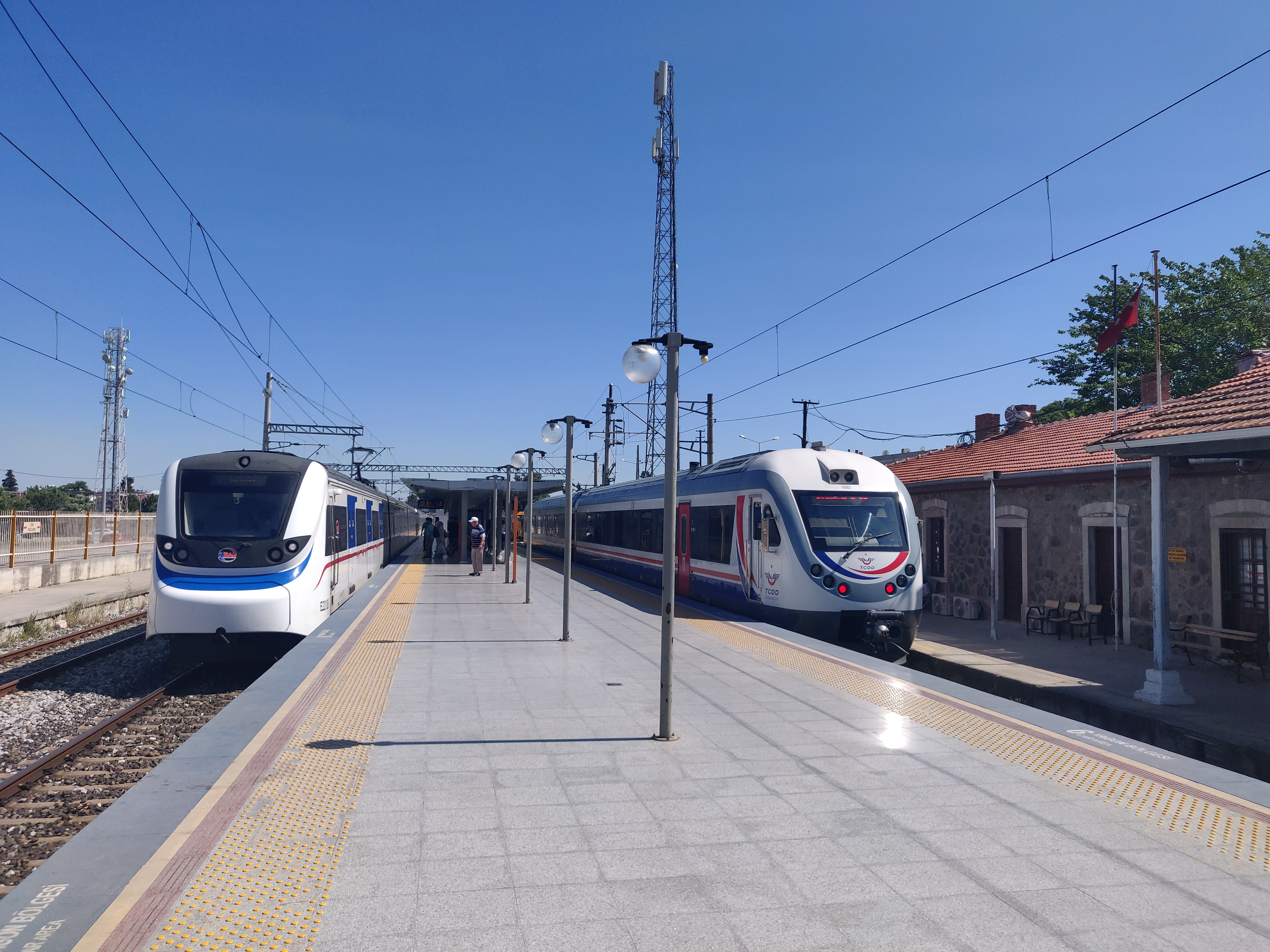
- A TCDDT southbound regional train (right) and an İZBAN northbound commuter train (left) meet at the station.

General information
- Location: Kahramanlar Cd. 124, Dokuz Eylül Mah. 35410, Gaziemir, İzmir; Turkey
- System: TCDD regional rail station İZBAN commuter rail station
- Owner: Turkish State Railways
- Operator: TCDD Transport; İZBAN A.Ş.
- Lines: İzmir-Eğirdir railway Gaziemir-Seydiköy railway (1876–1986)
- Platforms: 3 (2 side platforms, 1 island platform)
- Tracks: 3
- Connections: ESHOT Bus: 828

Construction
- Parking: No
- Accessible: Yes

History
- Opened: 24 December 1860; 165 years ago
- Rebuilt: 2006–2009; 17 years ago
- Electrified: 25 kV AC 50 Hz

Services
Preceding station	TCDD Taşımacılık	Following station
İzmir (Basmane) Terminus	İzmir–Denizli	Havalimanı towards Denizli
İzmir (Basmane) Terminus	İzmir–Nazilli	Havalimanı towards Nazilli
İzmir (Basmane) Terminus	İzmir–Söke	Havalimanı towards Söke
İzmir (Basmane) Terminus	İzmir–Ödemiş	Havalimanı towards Ödemiş Şehir
İzmir (Basmane) Terminus	İzmir–Tire	Havalimanı towards Tire
Preceding station	İZBAN	Following station
ESBAŞ towards Aliağa	Aliağa-Cumaovası	Sarnıç towards Cumaovası
ESBAŞ towards Aliağa	Aliağa-Tepeköy (Late nights)	Sarnıç towards Tepeköy
ESBAŞ towards Menemen	Menemen-Tepeköy	Sarnıç towards Tepeköy
Location

Gaziemir railway station (Turkish: Gaziemir istasyonu) is a railway station in Gaziemir, a southern suburb of İzmir, Turkey. Located between 302nd St. and 351st St. on the İzmir-Eğirdir railway, the station lies 1.3 km (0.81 mi) east of Gaziemir's town center. The station is serviced by İZBAN commuter trains along with regional trains operated by TCDD Transport. Originally opened in December 1860 by the Ottoman Railway Company, the station used to be a junction where the 1.4 km (0.87 mi) long Seydiköy branch branched off the mainline. Located within İZBAN's Central line, trains run north to Alsancak, Menemen and Aliağa and south to Cumaovası and Tepeköy.

== History ==
Gaziemir station was built by the Ottoman Railway Company in 1858, as part of their railway from İzmir to Aydın, putting it among the oldest railway stations in Turkey. The railway began at the port of Alsancak and ran south to Gaziemir, which was known at the time as Seydiköy. However, it was not until 24 December 1860, that the railway officially opened; when the ORC extended the line 34 km (21 mi) south to Torbalı. Since the mainline was built just to the east of town, a short branch was constructed from Gaziemir station to Seydiköy, opening in December 1876. This branch railway was privately owned by two wealthy families and provided a connection for the residents of Seydiköy to the trains of the ORC. In 1907, the ORC purchased this branch for 6,000 Ottoman liras.

The ORC was purchased by the Turkish State Railways in 1935, as part of the Turkish governments railway nationalization program. TCDD continued to operate passenger trains from Gaziemir north to İzmir and to destinations south, as well as local train service on the Seydiköy branch. The Seydiköy branch was one of several railways that would not survive the cuts of Turgut Özal's government in the late 1980s. With the expansion of the D.550 highway from four to six lanes, the grade crossing was removed and citing revenue loss for the state railways, the branch was closed in 1986 and Gaziemir ceased to be a junction. Gaziemir continued to host intercity, regional and commuter trains, most notably being TCDD's commuter service between Alsancak and Cumaovası. In 1999, the İzmir Metropolitan Municipality and the Turkish State Railways put forward plans for the Aliağa-Menderes railway corridor. This project would see the complete overhaul of the railway, including electrification, signalization and the re-construction of its stations. Gaziemir was electrified in 2004, but did not see electric train service as the project was revised to lower the railway underground at Şirinyer. This saw the temporary cancellation of all TCDD trains between Alsancak and Gaziemir. Local trains between Alsancak and Cumaovası were canceled entirely and all intercity and regional trains were truncated back to Gaziemir on 24 July 2006. During this time, TCDD offered express bus service between Gaziemir and Basmane station to compensate for the gap in rail service. The small yard at Gaziemir and Cumaovası was used as layover tracks for TCDD trains, as their main yard at Halkapınar was temporarily inaccessible. In anticipation for new İZBAN commuter rail service, Gaziemir's platforms were rebuilt and expanded; the island platform was rebuilt to a high-level platform to accommodate for the new EMUs, while a side platform was added on the east track for TCDD trains. The south part of the island platform was extended and kept as a low-level platform. An underpass was added, with an information booth, ticket machines and turnstiles and PIS boards were added to the platforms. In 2009, TCDD resumed service to Basmane station, ending Gaziemir's short stint as a terminus.

On 1 July 2010, İZBAN began testing its trains between Alsancak and Cumaovası, including Gaziemir. About two months later, İZBAN's Southern Line opened, on 30 August.

== Layout and Location ==
Gaziemir station is located roughly 300 m (980 ft) east of the D.550 state highway, on the tip of Önder Avenue. 302nd St. runs parallel to the railway on the station's west side, while 351st St. runs parallel on the east side. The former Seydiköy branch had its own platform on the north-west side of the station building. Its right-of-way has since been converted to a walking path. The station itself has three tracks and three platforms along with two sidings, one of each side. The island platform consists of two separated platforms, one 270 m (890 ft) high-level platform for İZBAN trains and one 160 m (520 ft) long low-level platform for TCDDT trains, although this platform is rarely used. The low-level side platform on the east track is serviced by northbound TCDDT trains while the low-level side platform on the west side is the one primarily used by southbound TCDDT trains.

=== Station layout ===
Track Level	Side platform, doors on the right
Track Level	Track 3	TCDDT to Basmane (Basmane) ←
Track Level	Track 2	İZBAN to Menemen or Aliağa (ESBAŞ) ←
Track Level	Island platform, doors on the right
Track Level	Track 1	İZBAN to Cumaovası or Tepeköy (Sarnıç) → TCDDT to points south (Havalimanı) →
Track Level	Side platform, doors on the right
Ground/Concourse	Customer service	Tickets; Exits

== Connections ==
ESHOT operates regional bus service, accessible from the station.

ESHOT Bus service
Route number	Stop	Route	Location
828	Hacı Bayram Cami	Sarnıç — Yeni Çamlık	Kahramanlar Street
