= M3 (İzmir Metro) =

Planned İzmir Metro line, Turkey

Menderes–Konak Line
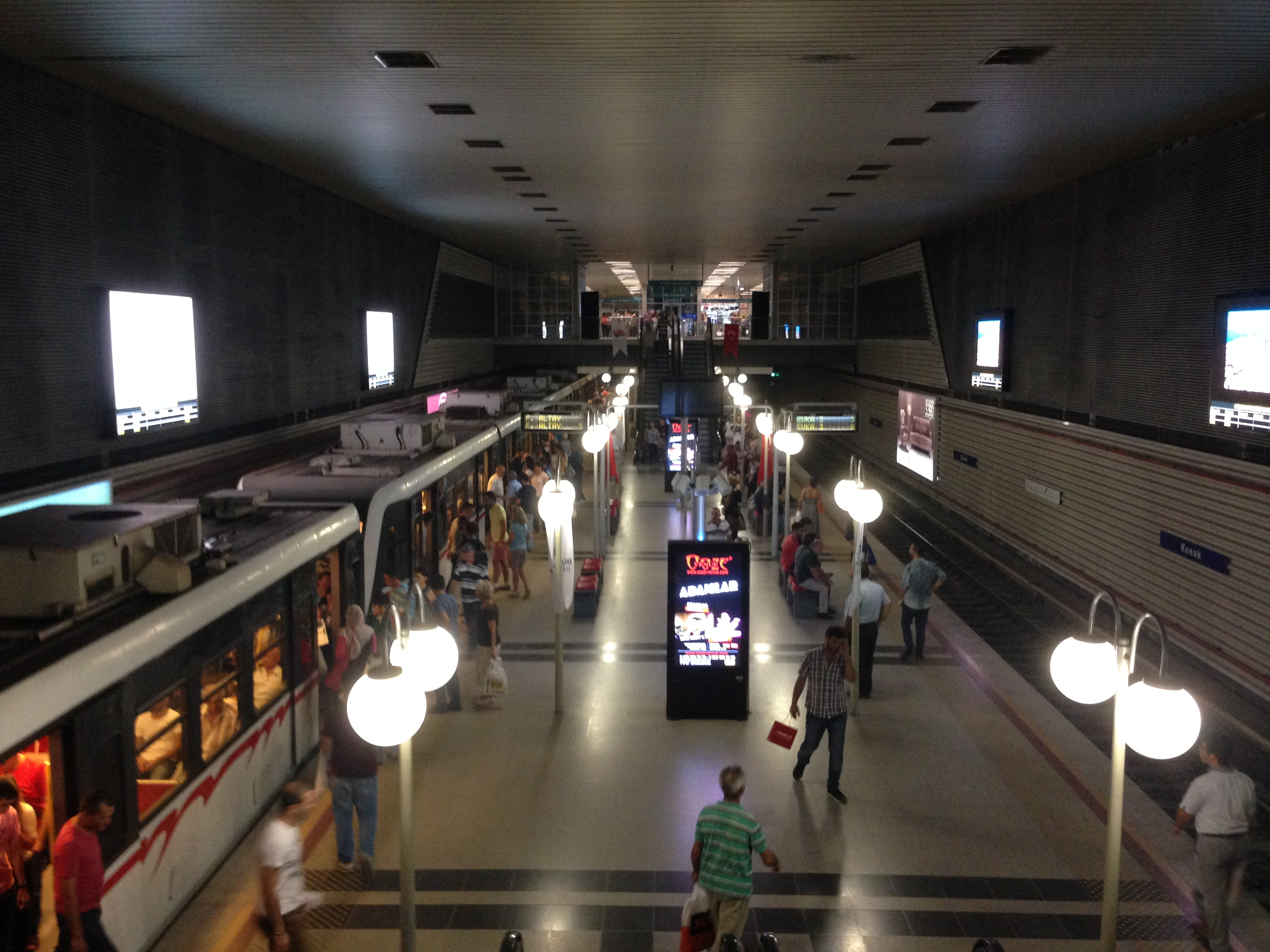
- The northern terminus of the line, Konak.

Overview
- Native name: Menderes–Konak Hattı
- Status: Planned
- Owner: İzmir Metropolitan Municipality
- Line number: 3
- Locale: İzmir, Turkey
- Termini: Konak, Konak (North); Menderes, Menderes (South)
- Stations: 18

Service
- Type: Rapid transit
- System: İzmir Metro
- Operator(s): İzmir Metro A.Ş.
- Depot(s): Gaziemir depot

Technical
- Line length: 22.3 km (13.9 mi)
- Number of tracks: 2
- Track gauge: 1,435 mm (4 ft 8 1/2 in) standard gauge
- Minimum radius: 160 metres (520 ft)
- Electrification: 750V DC Third rail, bottom contact
- Operating speed: 100 km/h (62 mph)
- Signalling: Unattended operation with CBTC

The M3 line, also referred as Menderes–Konak Line (Turkish: Menderes–Konak Hattı) is a planned ATO rapid transit line in İzmir, Turkey. The line has a total length of 22.3 km (13.9 mi) and would begin at Konak and run south into Menderes. When completed, the line will become the second driverless metro line in İzmir, after the M2 line.

== History ==
A tender was awarded in December 2019 for the implementation of the project of the line. The introductory meeting of the line, which will cost 2.105 billion euros, was held on 31 January 2023.

== Stations ==
The line will consist of eighteen stations, of which fifteen are new and three (Fuar İzmir, General Asım Gündüz and Konak) will connect to the existing lines. The list of stations are as follows:

- Menderes
- Görece
- Menderes Sanayi
- Adnan Menderes Airport
- Gaziemir Güvenpark
- Gaziemir Stadyum
- Abdullah Arda
- Gaziemir Kaymakamlık
- ESBAŞ
- Fuar İzmir
- Altan Aydın
- Atatürk Anadolu TML
- Dostluk Bulvarı
- Seniha Mayda
- Eski İzmir
- Çalıkuşu
- General Asım Gündüz
- Konak
