= D.E.Ü. Tınaztepe Kampüsü (İzmir Metro) =

Proposed underground station

General information
- Location: Doğuş Cd. No:209, Atatürk Mah., 35400; Buca
- Coordinates: 38.373701°N 27.193741°E
- System: İzmir Metro rapid transit station
- Owner: İzmir Metropolitan Municipality
- Operator: İzmir Metro A.Ş.
- Line: M2
- Tracks: 2

Construction
- Structure type: deep tunnel
- Parking: provided on opposite side of the road
- Accessible: Yes

Other information
- Fare zone: A

History
- Opened: 2027; 1 year's time (expected)

Services
Preceding station	İzmir Metro	Following station
Future service
Hasanağa Parkı towards Üçyol	M2	Buca Koop. towards Fuar İzmir
Location

D.E.Ü. Tınaztepe Kampüsü is a proposed underground station on the Üçyol—Fuar İzmir Line of the İzmir Metro. It will be located beneath Doğuş Avenue in southeast Buca, next to the Dokuz Eylül University's Tınaztepe campus. Construction of the station, along with the metro line, began in 2024.
