= General Asım Gündüz (İzmir Metro) =

General information
- Location: Halide Edip Adıvar Cd., Güneşli Mah., 35110; Konak
- Coordinates: 38.396224°N 27.133137°E
- System: İzmir Metro rapid transit station
- Owner: İzmir Metropolitan Municipality
- Operator: İzmir Metro A.Ş.
- Line: M2 M3
- Tracks: 2

Construction
- Accessible: Yes

History
- Opened: 2027; 1 year's time (expected)

Services
Preceding station	İzmir Metro	Following station
Future service
Zafertepe towards Üçyol	M2	Şirinyer towards Fuar İzmir
Çalıkuşu towards Menderes	M3	Konak Terminus
Location

General Asım Gündüz is a proposed underground station on the Üçyol–Fuar İzmir Line of the İzmir Metro. It will be located beneath Halide Edip Adıvar Boulevard, next to Mahmut Yaşar Bostancı Park, in southern Konak. Construction of the station, along with the metro line, began in 2024. The station will also be a part of the proposed Konak—Menderes Line of the İzmir Metro.
