= Çamlıkule (İzmir Metro) =

General information
- Location: 220/39 Sk., Çamlıkule Mah., 35390; Buca
- Coordinates: 38.370556°N 27.171111°E
- System: İzmir Metro rapid transit station
- Owner: İzmir Metropolitan Municipality
- Operator: İzmir Metro A.Ş.
- Line: M2
- Platforms: 1 island platform
- Tracks: 2

Construction
- Accessible: Yes

History
- Opening: 2027; 1 year's time (expected)

Services
Preceding station	İzmir Metro	Following station
Future service
Buca Koop. towards Üçyol	M2	Gediz towards Fuar İzmir
Location

Çamlıkule is a proposed underground station on the Üçyol—Fuar İzmir Line of the İzmir Metro. It will be located beneath 220/39th Street in Çamlıkule, Buca. Construction of the station, along with the metro line, began in 2024. Çamlıkule was the original southern terminus of the line until August 2025, when the line was extended three station further to Fuar İzmir.
