= Çevik Bir Meydanı (İzmir Metro) =

General information
- Location: Özmen Cd., Kozağaç Mah., 35390; Buca
- Coordinates: 38.3830308°N 27.170791°E
- System: İzmir Metro rapid transit station
- Owner: İzmir Metropolitan Municipality
- Operator: İzmir Metro A.Ş.
- Line: M2
- Tracks: 2

Construction
- Accessible: Yes

History
- Opened: 2027; 1 year's time (expected)

Services
Preceding station	İzmir Metro	Following station
Future service
Buca Belediye towards Üçyol	M2	Hasanağa Parkı towards Fuar İzmir
Location

Çevik Bir Meydanı is a proposed underground station on the Üçyol—Fuar İzmir Line of the İzmir Metro. It will be located beneath Menderes Avenue in Buca. Construction of the station, along with the metro line, began in 2024.
