= Şirinyer (İzmir Metro) =

Proposed metro station

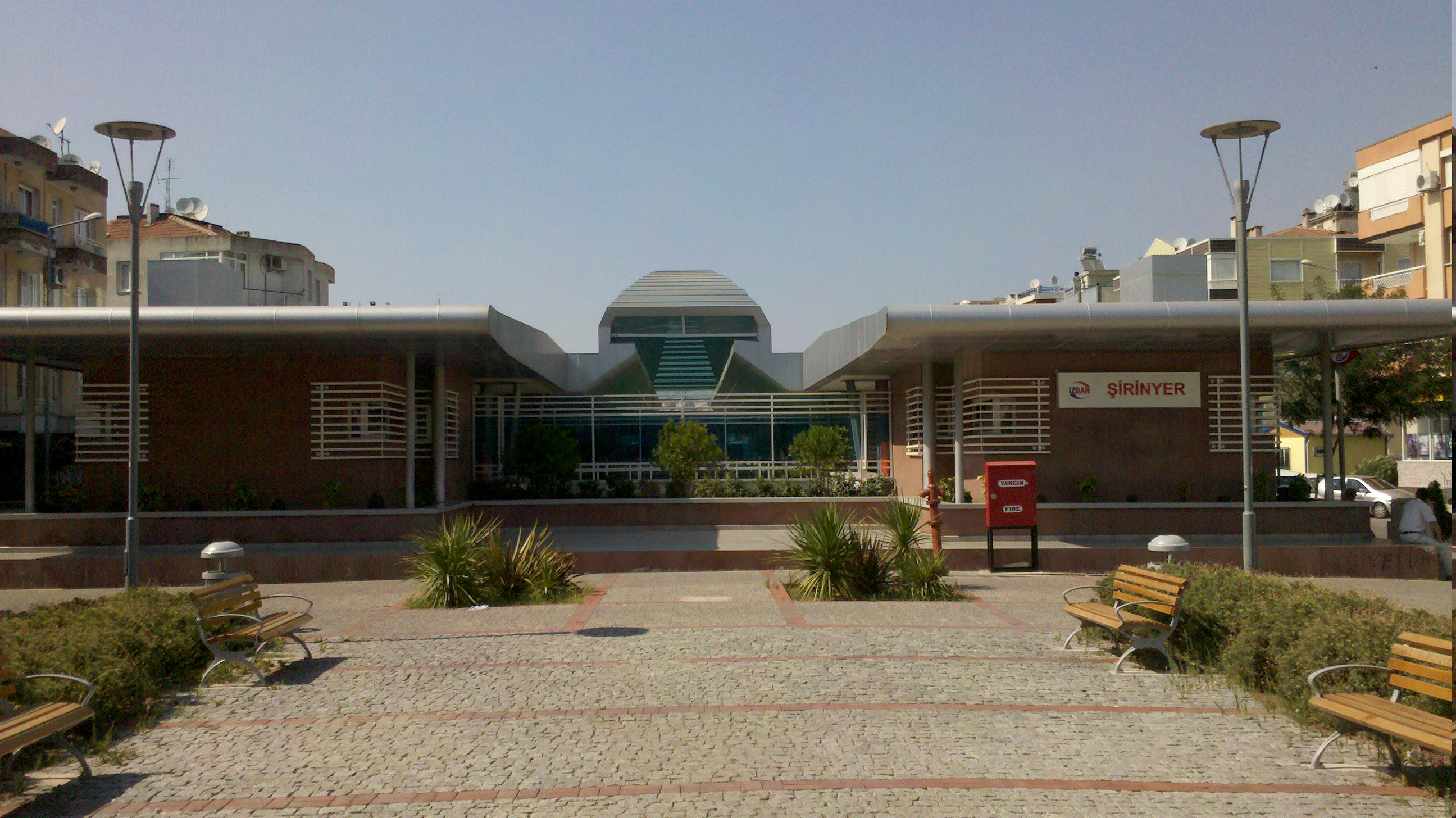
- Şirinyer station will be built beneath the existing Şirinyer railway station.

General information
- Location: Mehmet Akif Cd., İnkılap Mah., 35380; Buca
- Coordinates: 38.391167°N 27.149028°E
- System: İzmir Metro rapid transit station
- Owner: İzmir Metropolitan Municipality
- Operator: İzmir Metro A.Ş.
- Line: M2
- Tracks: 2
- Connections: İZBAN at Şirinyer station

Construction
- Accessible: Yes

History
- Opened: 2027; 1 year's time (expected)

Services
Preceding station	İzmir Metro	Following station
Future service
General Asım Gündüz towards Üçyol	M2	Buca Belediyesi towards Fuar İzmir
Location

Şirinyer is a proposed underground station on the Üçyol—Fuar İzmir Line of the İzmir Metro. It will be located beneath Mehmet Akif Avenue, next to the Şirinyer railway station, in western Buca. Construction of the station, along with the metro line, began in 2020. Connection to İZBAN commuter rail service will be available from the station. Once complete, Şirinyer will become the fourth station on the İzmir Metro to have direct connection to heavy rail service, along with Basmane, Hilal and Halkapınar.
