= Adnan Menderes Airport railway station =

Railway station in Gaziemir, İzmir, Turkey

Adnan Menderes Havalimanı
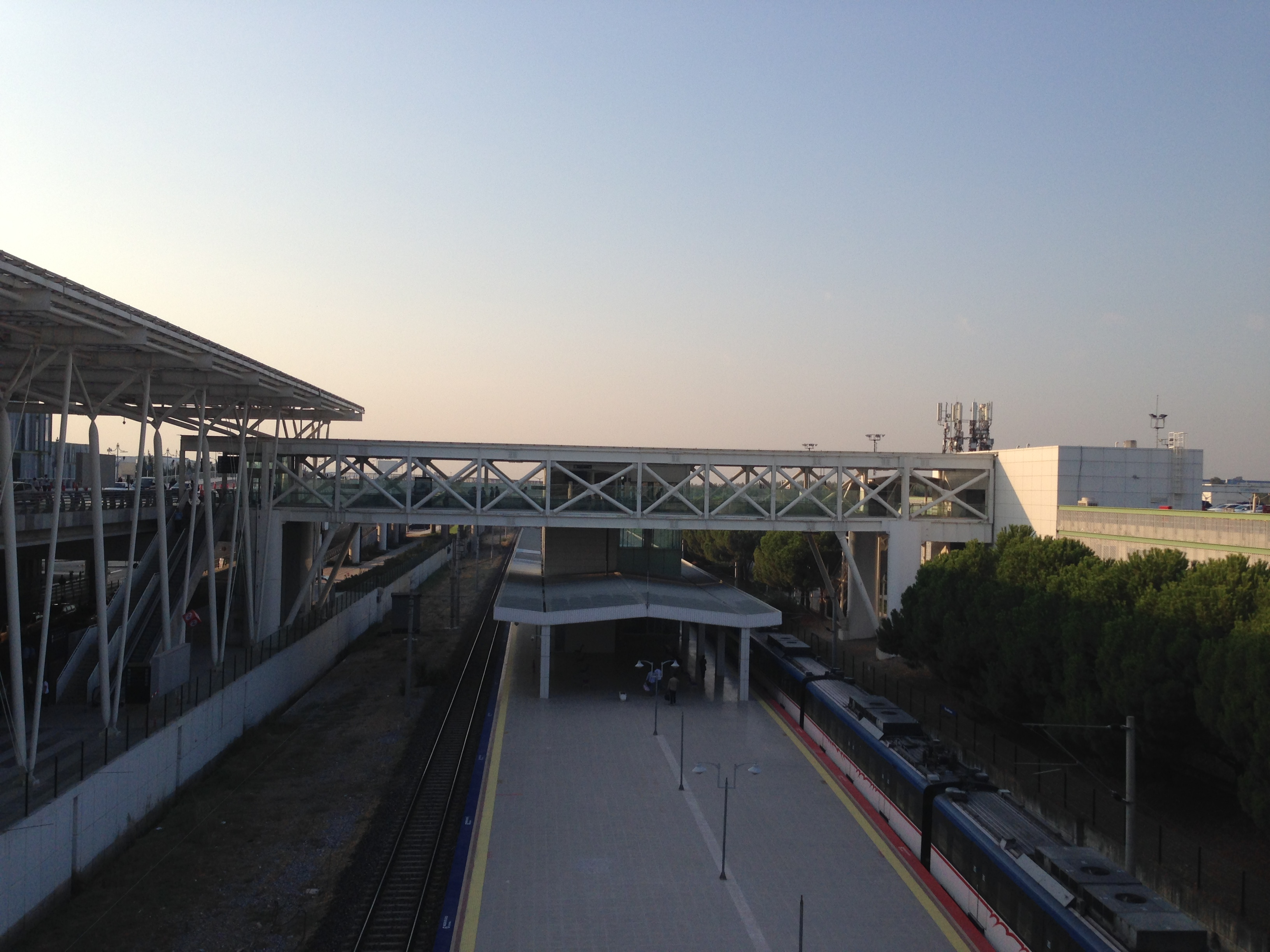
- A southbound IZBAN train during the early morning.

General information
- Coordinates: 38.29250°N 27.14756°E
- System: TCDD regional rail station İZBAN commuter rail station.
- Owner: Turkish State Railways
- Operator: TCDD Transport; İZBAN A.Ş.
- Line: İzmir-Eğirdir railway
- Platforms: 1
- Tracks: 2
- Connections: ESHOT Bus: 200, 202, 204, 206

Construction
- Parking: Garage adjacent to station
- Cycle facilities: Yes
- Accessible: Yes

Other information
- Status: In Operation
- Station code: ADB (IATA)

History
- Opened: 1987; 39 years ago
- Rebuilt: 2010; 16 years ago
- Electrified: 2001; 25 years ago 25 kV AC

Services
Preceding station	TCDD Taşımacılık	Following station
Gaziemir towards İzmir (Basmane)	İzmir–Denizli	Cumaovası towards Denizli
Gaziemir towards İzmir (Basmane)	İzmir–Nazilli	Cumaovası towards Nazilli
Gaziemir towards İzmir (Basmane)	İzmir–Söke	Cumaovası towards Söke
Gaziemir towards İzmir (Basmane)	İzmir–Ödemiş	Cumaovası towards Ödemiş Şehir
Gaziemir towards İzmir (Basmane)	İzmir–Tire	Cumaovası towards Tire
Preceding station	İZBAN	Following station
Sarnıç towards Aliağa	Aliağa-Cumaovası	Cumaovası Terminus
Sarnıç towards Aliağa	Aliağa-Tepeköy (Late nights)	Cumaovası towards Tepeköy
Sarnıç towards Menemen	Menemen-Tepeköy	Cumaovası towards Tepeköy
Location

Adnan Menderes Airport railway station also referred to as just Airport (Turkish: Adnan Menderes Havalimanı, Havalimanı) is a railway station in southern Gaziemir. The station is served by regional trains heading to southwestern Turkey, operated by the Turkish State Railways. The station allows a connection for people between planes at Adnan Menderes Airport to direct train service into İzmir. All regional trains stops at the station. The station was built in 1987 along with the completion of the airport. The İZBAN commuter rail service began serving the station on August 30, 2010. İZBAN operates between Aliağa and Tepeköy.

== Connections ==
ESHOT operates regional bus service, accessible from the station.

ESHOT Bus service
Route number	Stop	Route	Location
200	Havalimanı İç Hatlar Geliş (Domestic Arrivals), Havalimanı Dış Hatlar Geliş (International Arrivals)	Mavişehir Aktarma Merkezi — Havalimanı (Airport)	Adnan Menderes Airport
202	Havalimanı İç Hatlar Geliş (Domestic Arrivals), Havalimanı Dış Hatlar Geliş (International Arrivals)	Cumhuriyet Meydanı — Havalimanı (Airport)	Adnan Menderes Airport
204	Havalimanı İç Hatlar Geliş (Domestic Arrivals), Havalimanı Dış Hatlar Geliş (International Arrivals)	Bornova Metro — Havalimanı (Airport)	Adnan Menderes Airport
206	Havalimanı İç Hatlar Geliş (Domestic Arrivals), Havalimanı Dış Hatlar Geliş (International Arrivals)	Şirinyer Aktarma Merkezi — Havalimanı (Airport)	Adnan Menderes Airport
