= Bayındır railway station =

Bayındır

General information
- Location: Bayındır, İzmir Province; Turkey
- Coordinates: 38°12′45.6″N 27°38′55.7″E
- System: TCDD
- Owner: TCDD
- Line: Torbalı-Tire
- Platforms: 2
- Tracks: 3

Construction
- Structure type: At-grade
- Platform levels: 1

Other information
- Status: In Operation

History
- Opened: 1883; 143 years ago

Services
Preceding station	TCDD Taşımacılık	Following station
Furunlu towards İzmir (Basmane)	İzmir–Ödemiş	Bayındır Y.M.O. towards Ödemiş Şehir
Elifli towards İzmir (Basmane)	İzmir–Tire	Bayındır Y.M.O. towards Tire
Location

Bayındır station (Turkish: Bayındır garı) is a railway station in the town of Bayındır, Turkey. The station is served by the Turkish State Railways. 8 trains service the station going eastbound to Ödemiş or Tire and westbound to İzmir. The station was built in 1883 by the Oriental Railway Company and taken over by the Turkish State Railways in 1935.
