= M2 (İzmir Metro) =

Üçyol–Fuar İzmir Line
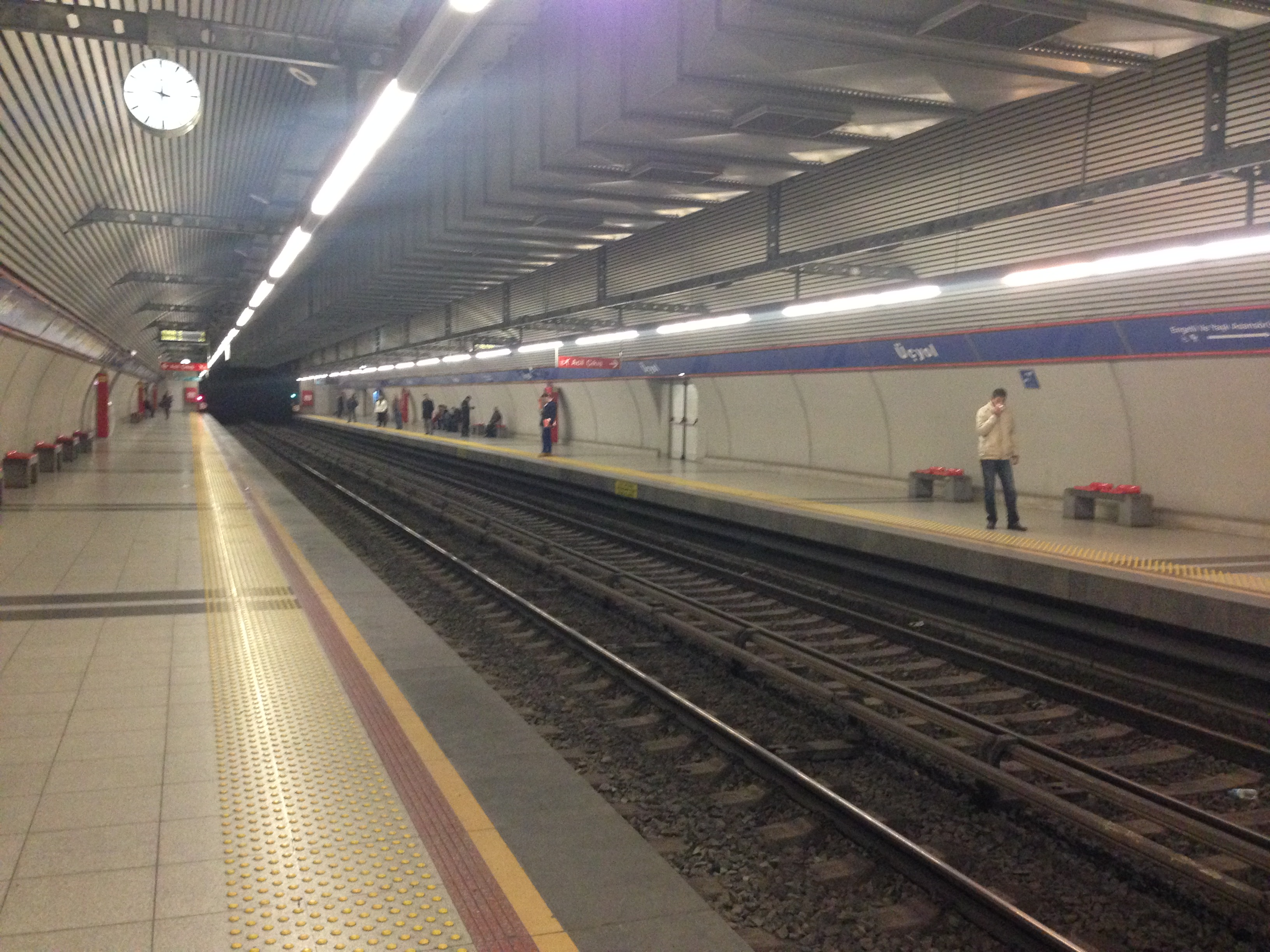
- The western terminus of the line, Üçyol.

Overview
- Other name: Buca Metro
- Native name: Üçyol–Fuar İzmir Hattı
- Status: Under Construction
- Owner: İzmir Metropolitan Municipality
- Line number: 2
- Locale: İzmir, Turkey
- Termini: Üçyol, Konak (Northwest); Fuar İzmir, Gaziemir (Southeast)
- Stations: 14
- Website: Buca Metro website İzmir Metro website

Service
- Type: Rapid transit
- System: İzmir Metro
- Services: Üçyol-Fuar İzmir; Fuar İzmir-Üçyol
- Operator: İzmir Metro A.Ş.
- Depots: Fuar İzmir depot; Eşrefpaşa siding
- Daily ridership: 400,000 (expected)

History
- Opened: 2027 (expected)

Technical
- Line length: 17.8 km (11.1 mi)
- Number of tracks: 2
- Track gauge: 1,435 mm (4 ft 8 1/2 in) standard gauge
- Minimum radius: 160 metres (520 ft)
- Electrification: 750V DC Third rail, bottom contact
- Operating speed: 100 km/h (62 mph)
- Signalling: Unattended operation with CBTC

The M2 line, also referred as Üçyol–Fuar İzmir Line (Turkish: Üçyol–Fuar İzmir Hattı) or more popularly the Buca Metro (Turkish: Buca Metrosu) is a planned ATO rapid transit line in İzmir, Turkey. The line has a total length of 17.8 km (11.1 mi) and would begin at Üçyol and run southeast into Buca and Gaziemir. When completed, the line will become the seventh driverless metro line in Turkey, and the first in İzmir, after the M5, M7, M8, M11, M12 and M14 lines in Istanbul. Construction started in 14 February 2022 and the line is expected to enter service in late 2027. It will cost $765 million, and the yearly expected profit from operation is $45 million.

== History ==
=== Background ===
Buca is the most populous district in İzmir and is one of the city's oldest settlements. Despite this, the only form of public transportation (aside from buses) is the Southern Line of the İZBAN commuter rail system, which runs along the far west side of the district. Prior to 2006, a railway to Buca was in service which provided commuter trains to Basmane and Alsancak stations in central İzmir. The railway was closed down in 2006, due to construction of the Şirinyer Tunnel, thus leaving central Buca without any access to rail transportation.

Plans to construct a metro line to Buca were first announced in 2005, but due to problems with the construction of the Üçyol-Fahrettin Altay extension, these plans were suspended. In 2009, the İzmir Metropolitan Municipality released a master plan for public transportation in the city. Included in this plan was a tram line from Şirinyer to central Buca. However, the Buca tram line was removed from the plan due to pressure from the Ministry of Transport.

=== Planning ===
Once the Fahrettin Altay extension of the existing metro line was completed in 2014, the city shifted its focus to the Buca metro. The line was originally planned to consist of seven stations and terminate at Buca Koop., one station before Çamlıkule. The plans were handed to the Ministry of Transport for evaluation in August 2015. The evaluation process took 12 months and was modified to extend the line from Buca Koop. to Çamlıkule as well as redesign the western end of the line as a loop. West of General Asım Gündüz station, the line would split and form a loop with Üçyol placed at the top. The northeastern part of the loop would consist of a station at Zafertepe, while the southwestern part would consist of a station at Bozyaka. The two sections would meet at Üçyol. A new maintenance facility in Tınaztepe was also included. The plan was finalized by the İzmir Municipality and submitted for an Environmental impact assessment in July 2017. Construction began in 2022 and is expected to be completed by 2027. Due to a contest notice filed by the 9th September University, the maintenance facility location changed to Adatepe. In August 2025, it was announced that the line would be extended to Fuar İzmir and the maintenance facility would be located there.

=== Construction ===
The groundbreaking ceremony was held in February 2022.

=== Funding ===
The European Bank for Reconstruction and Development agreed to a loan of €754.5 million in January 2020 to fund the line's construction.

The construction tender took place on 14 January 2021 and the construction will continue for four years. The metro line will consist of 14 stations and will be 17.8 km long. All of the metro route will be constructed with deep tunnel.

== Stations ==
The line will consist of fourteen stations, of which thirteen are new and one (Üçyol) will connect to the existing line. The list of stations are as follows:

- Üçyol
- Zafertepe
- General Asım Gündüz
- Şirinyer
- Buca Belediye
- Çevik Bir Meydanı
- Hasanağa Parkı
- D.E.Ü. Tınaztepe Kampüsü
- Buca Koop.
- Çamlıkule
- Çamlıpınar
- Gediz
- Semt Garajı
- Fuar İzmir
