= Zafertepe (İzmir Metro) =

General information
- Location: Yağhaneler Kavşağı, Zafertepe Mah., 35270; Konak
- Coordinates: 38.402282°N 27.129578°E
- System: İzmir Metro rapid transit station
- Owner: İzmir Metropolitan Municipality
- Operator: İzmir Metro A.Ş.
- Line: M2
- Tracks: 2

Construction
- Accessible: Yes

History
- Opened: 2027; 1 year's time (expected)

Services
Preceding station	İzmir Metro	Following station
Future service
Üçyol Terminus	M2	General Asım Gündüz towards Fuar İzmir
Location

Zafertepe is a proposed underground station on the Üçyol–Fuar İzmir Line of the İzmir Metro. It will be located beneath the Yağhaneler intersection in Zafertepe, Konak. Construction of the station, along with the metro line, began in 2024.
