= Tire Toki Mahallesi railway station =

Railway station in Tire, Turkey

Tire Toki Mahallesi

General information
- Location: İzmir-Ödemiş Yolu, Atatürk Mahallesi, Tire 35900
- System: TCDD regional rail station
- Owner: Turkish State Railways
- Lines: TCDD Taşıcımalk; Basmane-Tire Regional
- Platforms: 1 island platform
- Tracks: 1

Other information
- Status: In Operation

History
- Opened: January 2014; 12 years ago

Services
Preceding station	TCDD Taşımacılık	Following station
Çatal towards İzmir (Basmane)	İzmir–Tire	Tire Terminus
Location

Tire Toki Mahallesi station (Turkish: Tire Toki Mahallesi Durağı), officially designated as KM 91+300, is a railway station on the Çatal-Tire railway just north of Tire, Turkey. The station was opened in January 2014 to service the new TOKİ housing projects built nearby.
