= Elifli railway station =

Elifli

General information
- Location: Elifli Mah. 35840; Bayındır/İzmir; Turkey
- Coordinates: 38.1915°N 27.5822°E
- System: TCDD regional rail station
- Owner: Turkish State Railways
- Operator: TCDD Taşımacılık
- Line: İzmir–Ödemiş İzmir–Tire
- Platforms: 1 side platform
- Tracks: 1

Construction
- Structure type: At-grade

History
- Opened: 1883; 143 years ago

Services
| Preceding station | TCDD Taşımacılık | Following station |
|---|---|---|
| Karpuzlu towards İzmir (Basmane) | İzmir–Ödemiş | Furunlu towards Ödemiş Şehir |
| Karpuzlu towards İzmir (Basmane) | İzmir–Tire | Furunlu towards Tire |
Location

Elifli railway station is a station near the village of Elifli in the Torbalı district of the İzmir Province. Consisting of a single side platform, 14 daily trains operated by TCDD Taşımacılık stop at the station.
