= Çatal =

Çatal is a Turkish word meaning "fork". It may refer to:

- Çatal railway station, a station in İzmir Province, Turkey
- Çatalhöyük (also Çatal Hüyük/Höyük), an archaeological site in Konya Province, Turkey

Catal and Čatal

- Čatal Česjma, a water spring in the Republic of Macedonia

== See also ==
- Catalan (disambiguation)
