= Buca railway station =

Railway station in İzmir, Turkey, 1872–2006

BUCA
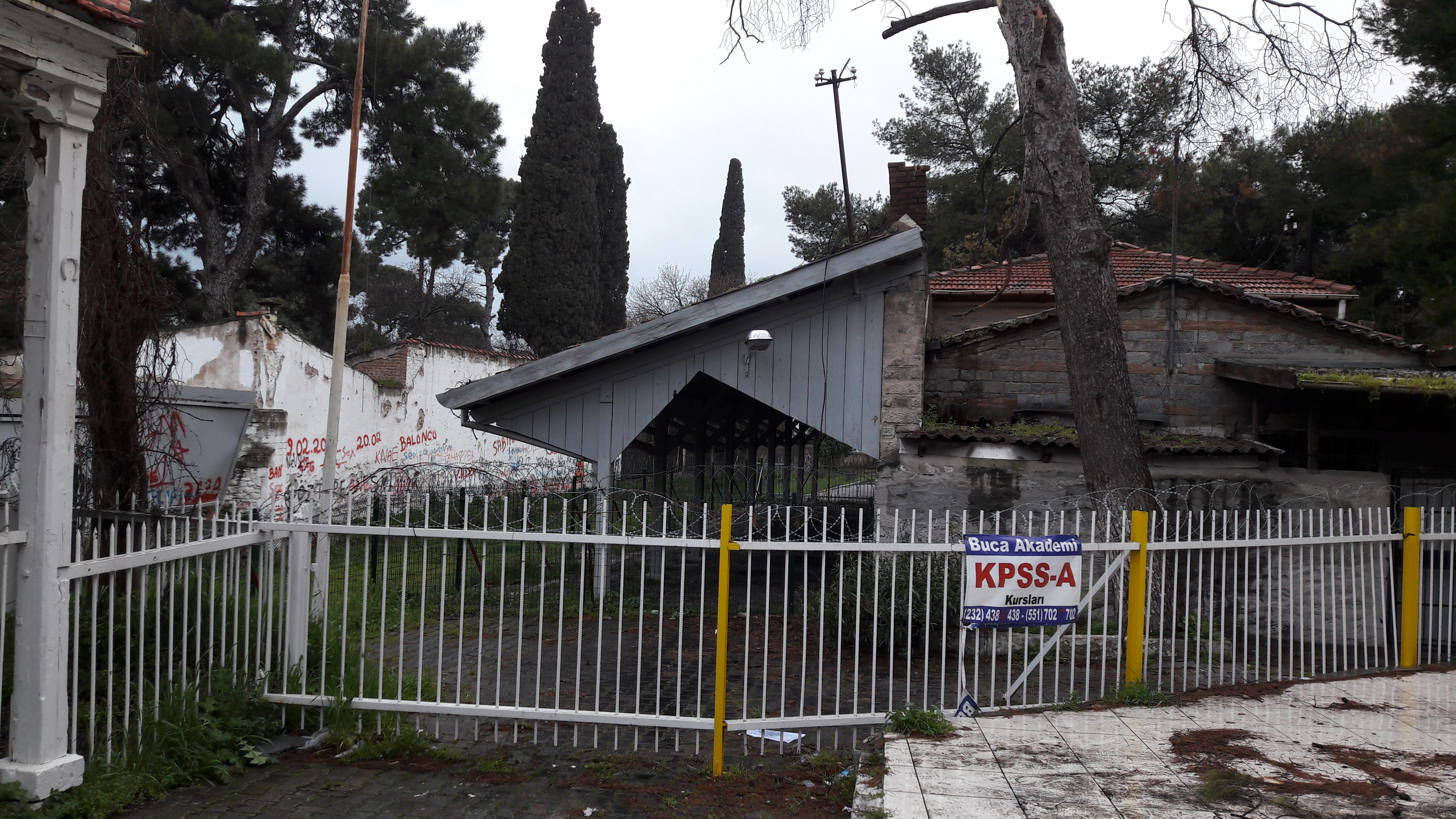
- The station in 2018, closed off with barbed wire fences.

General information
- Location: Uğur Mumcu Cd. 58C, Vali Rahmi Bey Mah. 35380; Buca, İzmir; Turkey
- Coordinates: 40.3859°N 28.1701°E
- Owner: Turkish State Railways
- Platforms: 1 side platform
- Tracks: 2

Construction
- Parking: No

History
- Opened: 1872
- Closed: 2006
Former services
Preceding station	Turkish State Railways	Following station
Efeler towards İzmir (Alsancak)	Buca suburban	Terminus
Efeler towards İzmir (Basmane)	Buca suburban	Terminus
Location

Buca station (Turkish: Buca garı) was a railway station in İzmir, Turkey. Located in the Vali Rahmi Bey neighborhood of Buca, it was one of the oldest railway stations in Turkey. The station was originally opened by the Buca Branch Railway, a subsidiary of the Ottoman Railway Company, in 1872.

== History ==
The construction of a 2.7 km (1.7 mi) railway from Şirinyer to Buca was considered as early as the late 1850s, but it wasn't until 1866 that plans were put into motion. Construction of the railway was approved on 7 January 1866 and the Buca Branch Railway (Turkish: Buca Şube Demiryolu) was formed. The railway was completed in 1870, but regular passenger service began two years later in 1872. A twice daily train operated from Alsancak station in İzmir to Buca, once in the morning and once in the evening. The station was used most by wealthy foreign business owners (Turkish: Levanten) who lived in Buca, but commuted to Alsancak for work, each day. The opening of the station greatly boosted the economy of Buca. In the mid 19th century, Buca was a relatively small residential village, but by the beginning of the 20th century it grew into a commuter town. The station was taken over by the Ottoman Railway Company, when the railway bought the Buca Branch Railway in 1902. The ORC was sold to the Turkish State Railways in 1935, which continued operating trains to Buca.

The railway to Buca, along with the station closed in 2006 due to the construction of the Şirinyer Tunnel. It was deemed too expensive to connect the Buca branch within the tunnel, so the railway was abandoned.

=== 2006 station timetable ===
During the twilight of the station's career in 2006, Buca station saw four daily commuter trains, three to Alsancak and one to Basmane. The timetable for these trains is as listed.

Time	Destination	Frequency
06:53	Alsancak	Weekdays
07:54	Alsancak	Weekdays
17:45	Alsancak	Weekdays
18:34	Basmane	Weekdays
