= Sarnıç railway station =

Railway station in İzmir, western Turkey

Sarnıç
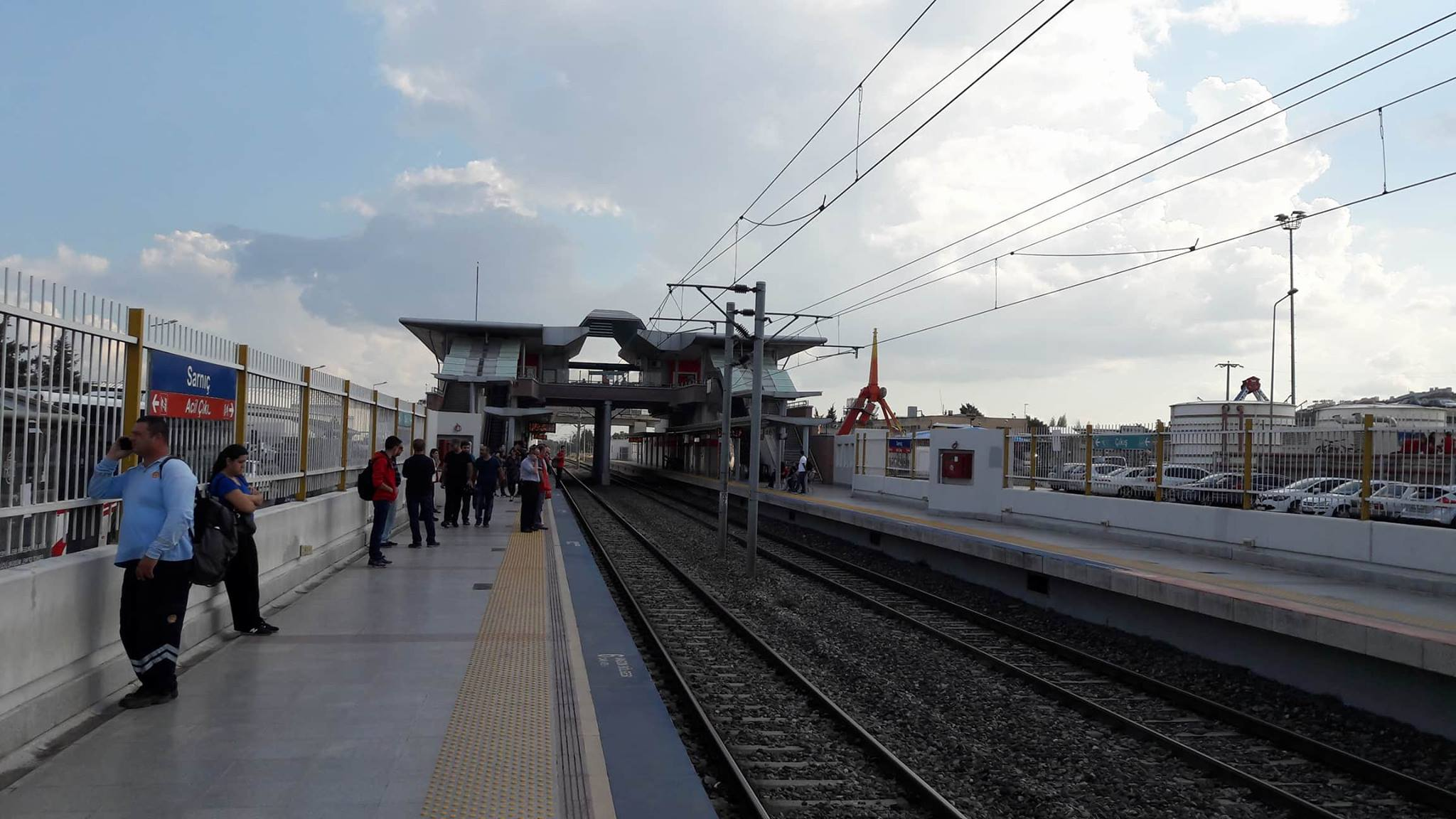
- Sarnıç station, looking south.

General information
- System: İZBAN commuter rail station
- Owner: Turkish State Railways
- Operator: TCDD Transport; İZBAN A.Ş.
- Line: İzmir-Eğirdir railway
- Platforms: 2
- Tracks: 2
- Connections: ESHOT Bus: 491, 705, 728, 828, 887, 889

Construction
- Accessible: Yes

History
- Opened: 1970
- Electrified: 2010

Services
Preceding station	İZBAN	Following station
Gaziemir towards Aliağa	Aliağa-Cumaovası	Havalimanı towards Cumaovası
Gaziemir towards Aliağa	Aliağa-Tepeköy (Late nights)	Havalimanı towards Tepeköy
Gaziemir towards Menemen	Menemen-Tepeköy	Havalimanı towards Tepeköy
Location

Sarnıç railway station is a railway station in Gaziemir, İzmir of the İZBAN commuter rail system. The station has two island platforms servicing two tracks. Connections to ESHOT bus service is available via the ESHOT transfer center located next to the station.

== Connections ==
ESHOT operates regional bus service, accessible from the station.

ESHOT Bus service
Route number	Stop	Route	Location
491	Sarnıç Aktarma Merkezi	Evka 7 — Sarnıç	692th Street
705	Sarnıç Aktarma Merkezi	Sarnıç — Sarnıç Aktarma Merkezi	692th Street
728	Sarnıç Aktarma Merkezi	Kısık Sanayi — Sarnıç Aktarma Merkezi	692th Street
828	Sarnıç Aktarma Merkezi	Sarnıç — Yeni Çamlık	692th Street
887	Sarnıç Aktarma Merkezi	Sarnıç Aktarma Merkezi — Konak	692th Street
889	Sarnıç Aktarma Merkezi	Ayrancılar — Sarnıç Aktarma Merkezi	692th Street

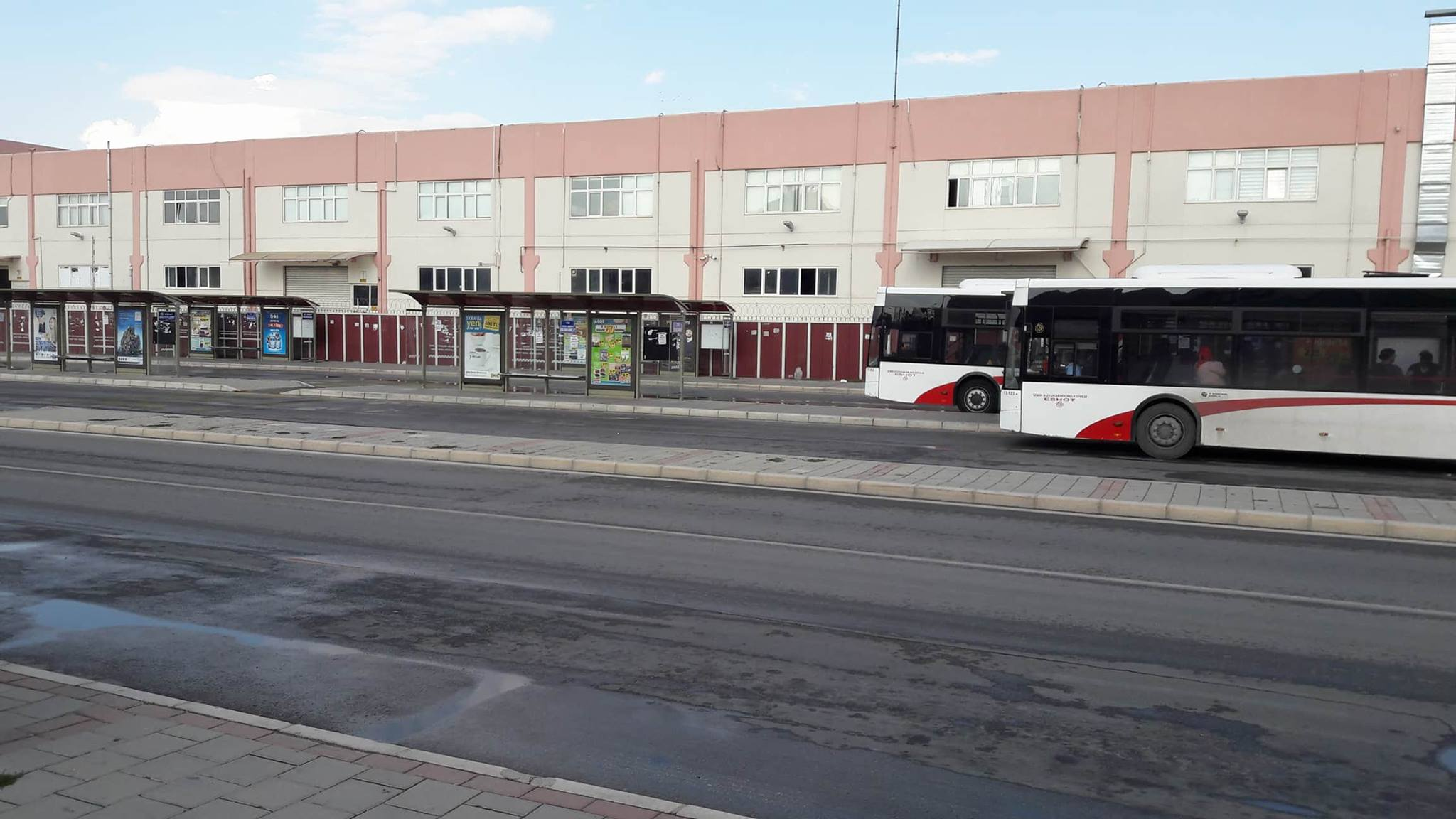
An ESHOT bus at Sarnıç Transfer
