= Efeler railway station =

Railway station in İzmir, Turkey

Efeler
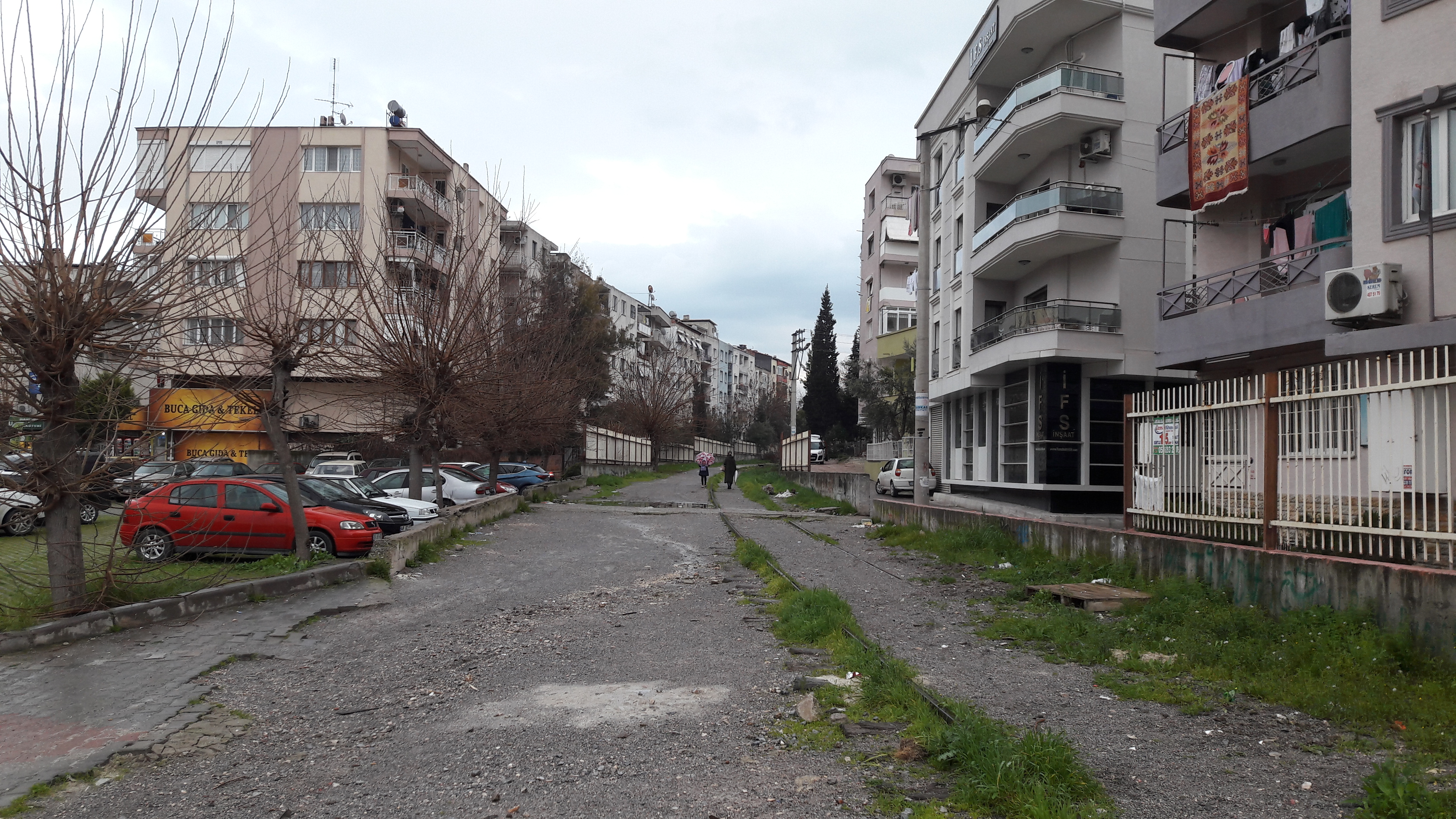
- The site of Efeler station in 2018.

General information
- Location: Cemil Şeboy Cd., Vali Rahmi Bey Mah., 35380; Buca, İzmir; Turkey
- Coordinates: 38.3889°N 27.1583°E
- Owner: Turkish State Railways
- Line: Buca suburban
- Platforms: 1 side platform
- Tracks: 1

Construction
- Parking: No

History
- Opened: 1995
- Closed: 2006
Former services
| Preceding station | Turkish State Railways | Following station |
|---|---|---|
| Şirinyer towards İzmir (Alsancak) | Buca suburban | Buca Terminus |
| Şirinyer towards İzmir (Basmane) | Buca suburban | Buca Terminus |
Location

Efeler railway station (Turkish: Efeler istasyonu) was a railway station in İzmir, Turkey. Located in the Vali Rahmi Bey neighborhood of Buca, it was a stop on the Buca suburban. Efeler station was opened in 1995 by the Turkish State Railways and consisted of a side platform serving one track. The station was closed in 2006 along with the railway branch to Buca.
