= Zeytinova =

- Neighbourhood
- Location in Turkey Zeytinova (İzmir)
- Coordinates: 38°12′N 27°44′E
- Country: Turkey
- Province: İzmir
- District: Bayındır
- Elevation: 15 m (49 ft)
- Population (2022): 1,214
- Time zone: UTC+3 (TRT)
- Postal code: 35840
- Area code: 0232

Zeytinova is a neighbourhood in the municipality and district of Bayındır, İzmir Province, Turkey. Its population is 1,214 (2022). Before the 2013 reorganisation, it was a town (belde). It is situated to the north of Büyükmenderes River and east of Bayındır. The distance to Bayındır is 12 kilometres (7.5 mi). The town was founded in 1973. Main crop of the town is olive. Tobacco, once popular, is now replaced by other crops.
