= Buca Branch Railway =

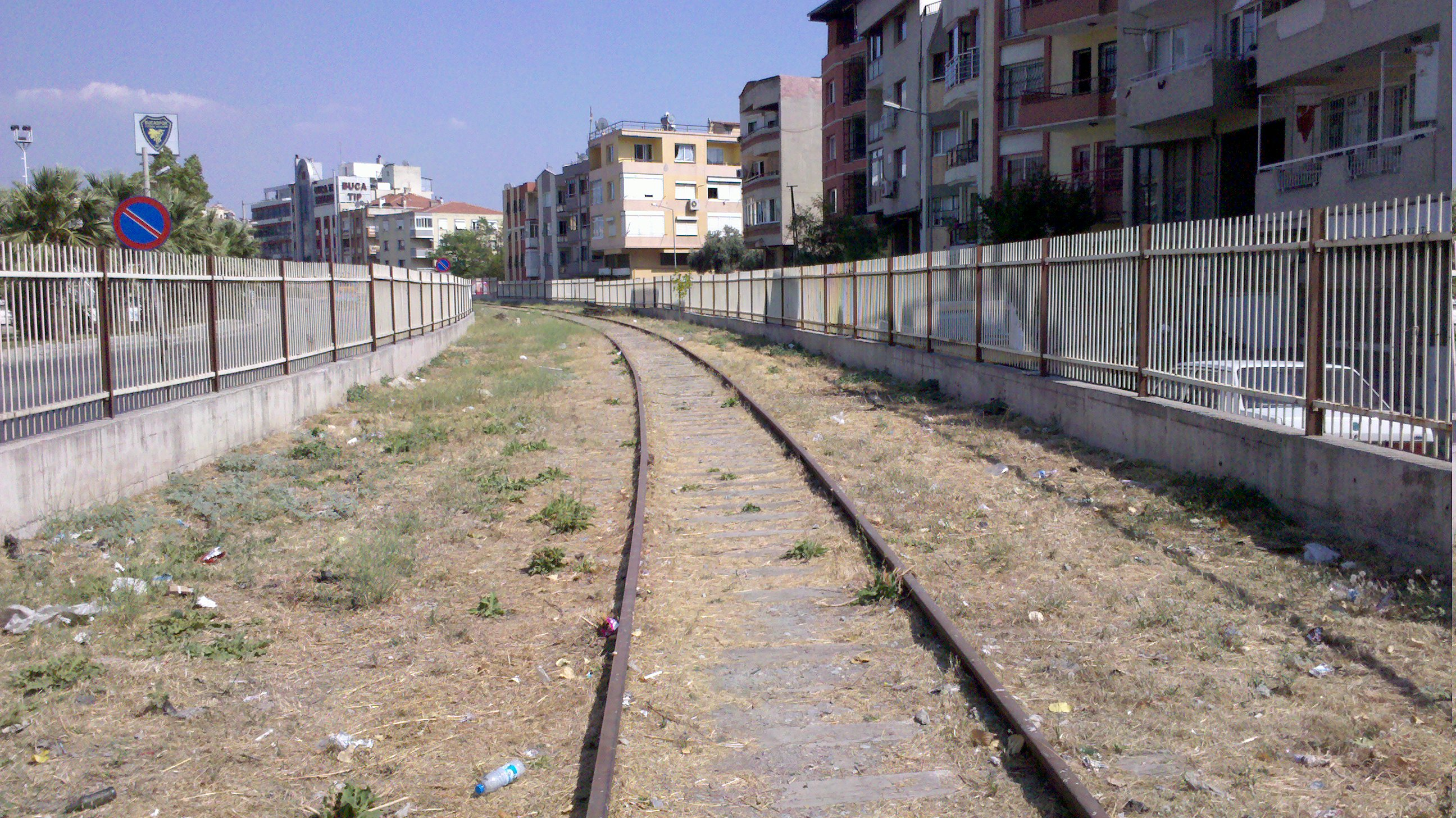
- The remaining tracks of the railway near Şirinyer

Overview
- Headquarters: Buca station, Buca
- Locale: Buca, İzmir
- Dates of operation: 1866–1902
- Successor: ORC

Technical
- Track gauge: 1,435 mm (4 ft 8 1/2 in)
- Length: 2.7 km (1.7 mi)

The Buca Branch Railway (Turkish: Buca Şube Demiryolu) was a short 2.7 km (1.7 mi) long railway that operated in İzmir between 1866 and 1902. The railway was a subsidiary of the Ottoman Railway Company, which formed the railway in 1866 to build a branch line to Buca. Throughout its existence the railway was highly profitable, serving wealthy Levantine business owners who commuted into the city each day.

== History ==
Ever since the Ottoman Railway Company was authorized to build a railway from İzmir to Aydın, in 1856, a railway to Buca was also considered. Wealthy business owners who lived in Buca but worked in Alsancak, commuted to the city every day. This made demand for a railway to Buca high. On 7 February 1866, the ORC formed the Buca Branch Railway to operate a railway to Buca, that would branch off from the İzmir-Aydın mainline at Paradiso station.

According to the agreement made by ORC representative Edmond Purse, the Buca Branch Railway is to be a subsidiary of the ORC giving the ORC the right to absorb the railway at any time. Fares on the line will be the same as on the ORC mainline while 40% of the profit will go to the ORC for trains heading to İzmir, and 60% for trains to Aydın.

The ORC also built a new station building at Punta station for passengers travelling to and from Buca. That building, known as the Buca station building, became the first clock tower in İzmir, opening in 1870.

The railway began operations in 1872, with two daily trains to and from Punta station in Alsancak. The opening of the railway also greatly boosted the growth of Buca, which was a quiet residential village in the mid-19th century. More and more residents, primarily Levantines, moved into the area. Two new churches, Saint Jean Baptiste and Saint Saints, were opened in the vicinity of Buca station. The line became quiet popular that by the end of the 19th century, there were a total of 11 daily trains operating between Buca and Punta. The total time of the trip was 40-45 minutes for Buca-bound trains and 25-30 minutes for Punta-bound trains.

The Buca Branch Railway was bought by the Ottoman Railway Company in 1902. The ORC kept operating the railway until 1935, when it was bought by the Turkish State Railways. The Buca branch was in operation up until 2006 when it was abandoned, due to the construction of the Şirinyer Tunnel.
