= Arapkent, Bismil =

Village in Diyarbakır Province, Turkey

Arapkent
- Neighbourhood
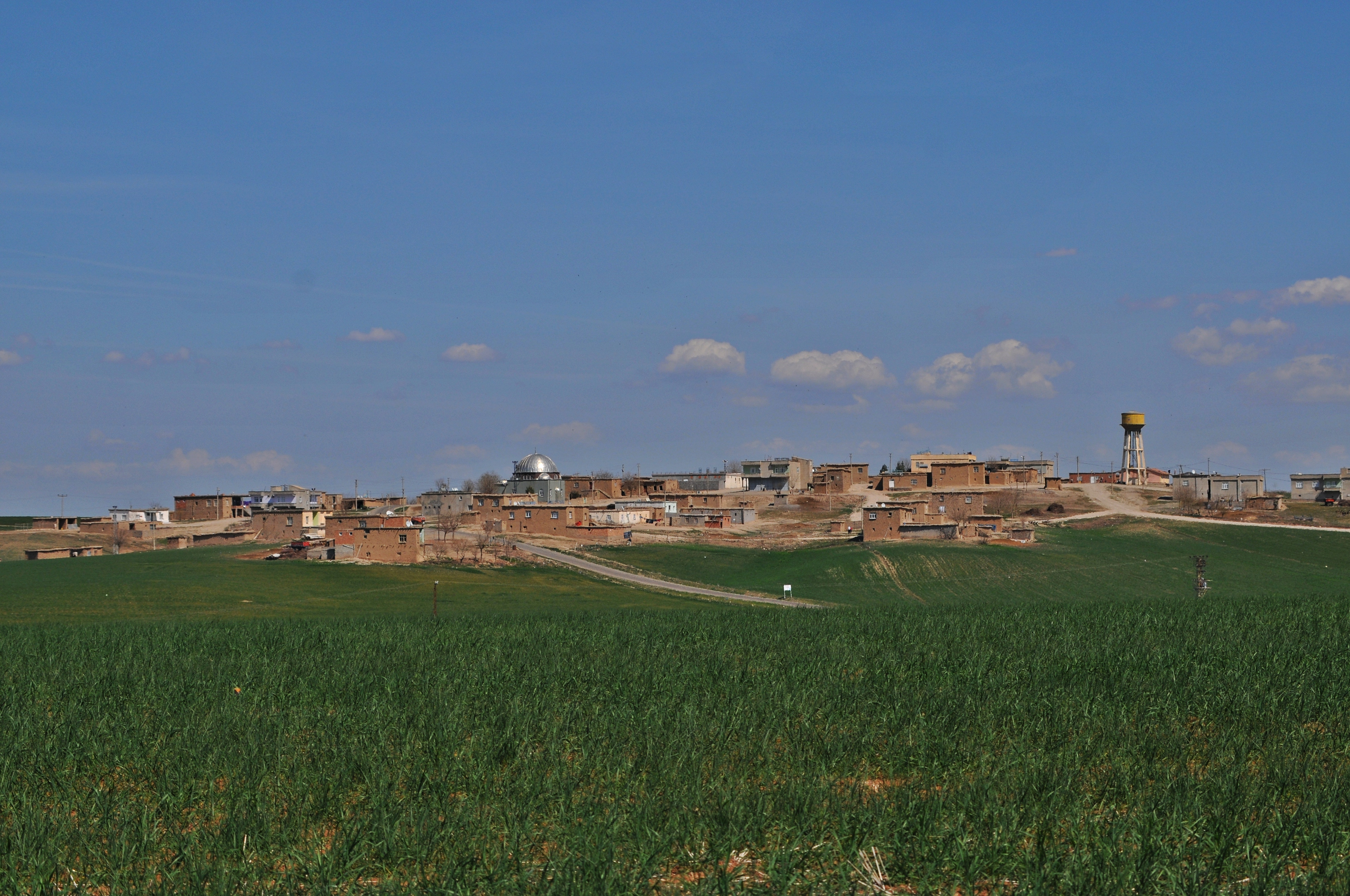

- Location within Turkey
- Coordinates: 37.764°N 40.862°E
- Country: Turkey
- Province: Diyarbakır
- District: Bismil
- Population (2022): 175
- Time zone: UTC+3 (TRT)

Arapkent (Kurdish: Arapkendî), (Note: Also known as Arabkend and Arakend.) formerly known as Bayındır, is a neighbourhood in the municipality and district of Bismil, Diyarbakır Province in Turkey. The village is populated by Kurds of the Barava tribe and had a population of 175 in 2022.

== History ==
Arapkent was historically inhabited by Syriac Orthodox Christians. It was located in the kaza (district) of Silvan in the Diyarbakır sanjak in the Diyarbekir vilayet in c. 1900. In 1914, it was populated by 100 Syriacs, according to the list presented to the Paris Peace Conference by the Assyro-Chaldean delegation. By 1914, it was situated in the Bafaya nahiyah (commune) of the kaza of Beşiri. No survivors of the Sayfo are attested from this area.

== Bibliography ==
- Gaunt, David (2006). Massacres, Resistance, Protectors: Muslim-Christian Relations in Eastern Anatolia during World War I. Gorgias Press.
- Jongerden, Joost; Verheij, Jelle, eds. (2012). Social Relations in Ottoman Diyarbekir, 1870-1915. Brill.
- Tan, Altan (2018). Turabidin'den Berriye'ye. Aşiretler - Dinler - Diller - Kültürler (in Turkish). ISBN 9789944360944.
