= Şirinyer Tunnel =

Railway tunnel in İzmir, Turkey

- Interactive map of Şirinyer Tunnel

Overview
- Official name: Şirinyer Tüneli
- Line: Southern Line
- Location: Şirinyer, Buca, İzmir
- Crosses: Mehmet Akif Street
- No. of stations: 1

Operation
- Work began: 24 July 2006
- Opened: 19 May 2010
- Owner: İZBAN
- Operator: İZBAN
- Character: Heavy rail

Technical
- Length: 2,000 m (6,600 ft)
- No. of tracks: 2

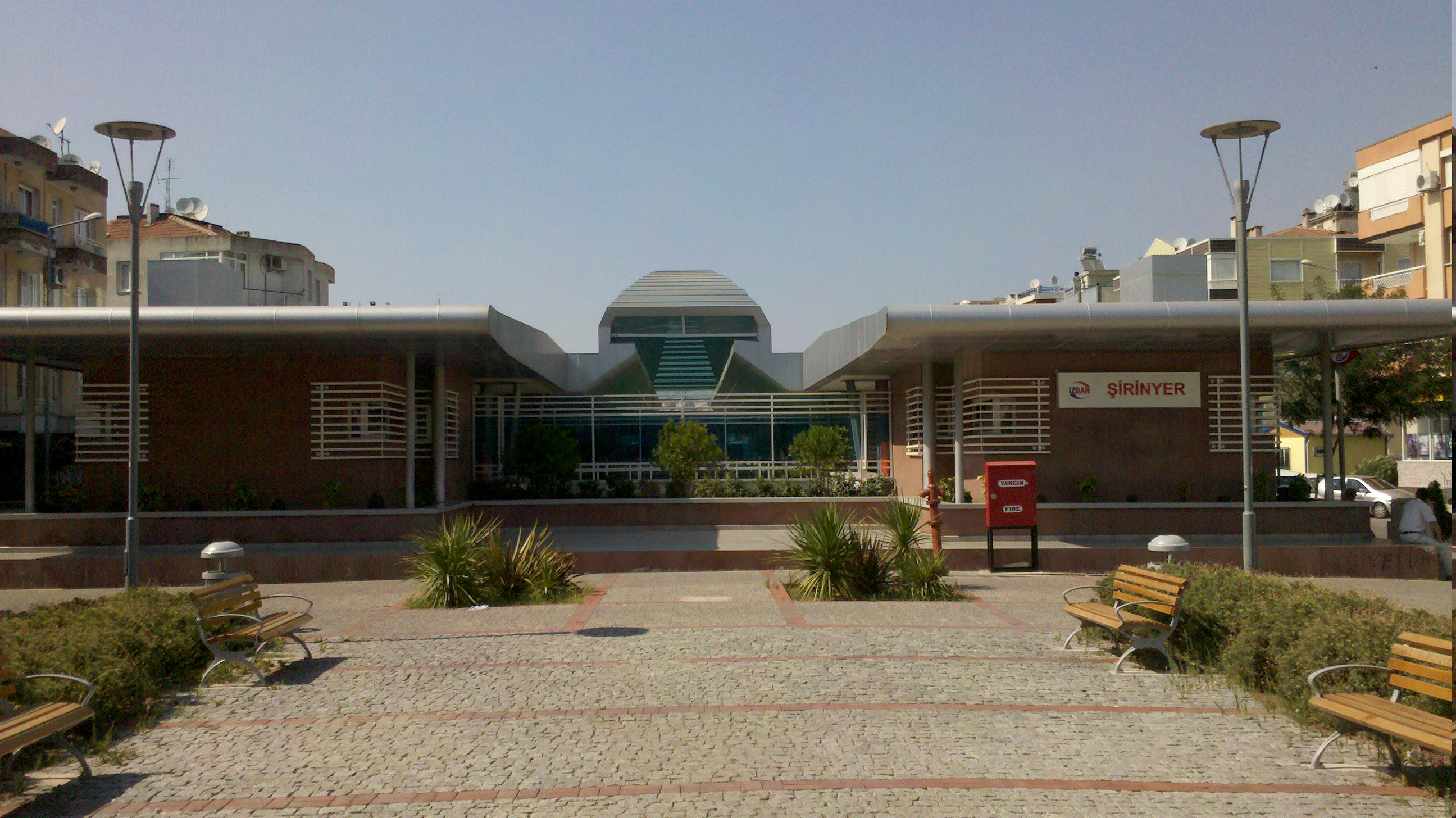
Sirinyer IZBAN station

The Şirinyer Tunnel (Turkish: Şirinyer Tünel) is a 2,000 m (6,600 ft) long tunnel that carries the Southern Line under Mehmet Akif street and Şirinyer station plaza. The tunnel also houses the Şirinyer railway station which are serviced by İZBAN commuter trains to Alsancak and Tepeköy railway station. Groundbreaking for the tunnel was done on 24 July 2006 and was opened to railway traffic on 19 May 2010.
