= Tire railway station =

Railway station in Tire, İzmir, Turkey

Tire
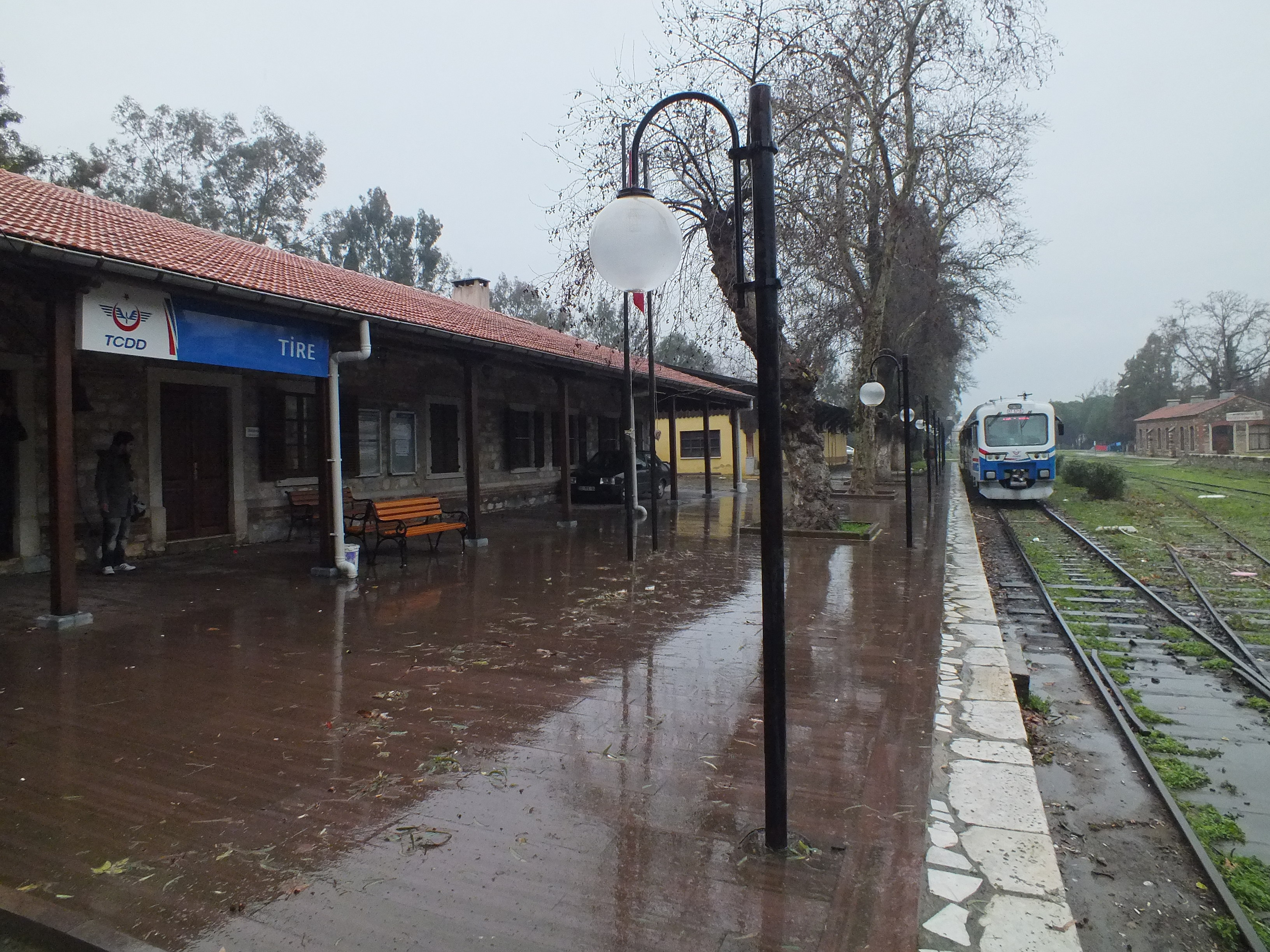
- Tire station on a rainy day

General information
- Location: Samim Üzer Cd. 2, Cumhuriyet Mah. 35910, Tire, İzmir, Turkey
- Coordinates: 38.0926°N 27.7286°E
- System: TCDD regional rail station
- Owner: Turkish State Railways
- Lines: Turkish State Railways; Basmane-Tire Regional
- Platforms: 2
- Tracks: 4
- Connections: ESHOT: 798

Construction
- Platform levels: 1

Other information
- Status: In Operation

History
- Opened: 1 September 1883; 143 years ago
- Rebuilt: 2013; 13 years ago

Services
Preceding station	TCDD Taşımacılık	Following station
Tire Toki Mahallesi towards İzmir (Basmane)	İzmir–Tire	Terminus
Çatal Terminus	Tire–Çatal	Terminus
Location

Tire station (Turkish: Tire garı) is the main railway station in Tire, Turkey and is the terminus of the 11 km (6.8 mi) long Çatal-Tire railway. The station was built in 1883 by the Ottoman Railway Company and taken over by the Turkish State Railways in 1935. The state railways operates four daily trains to İzmir in both directions.

== Bus connections ==
ESHOT

- 798 Tire-Torbalı
