= İzmir–Ödemiş Regional =

Rail service in Turkey

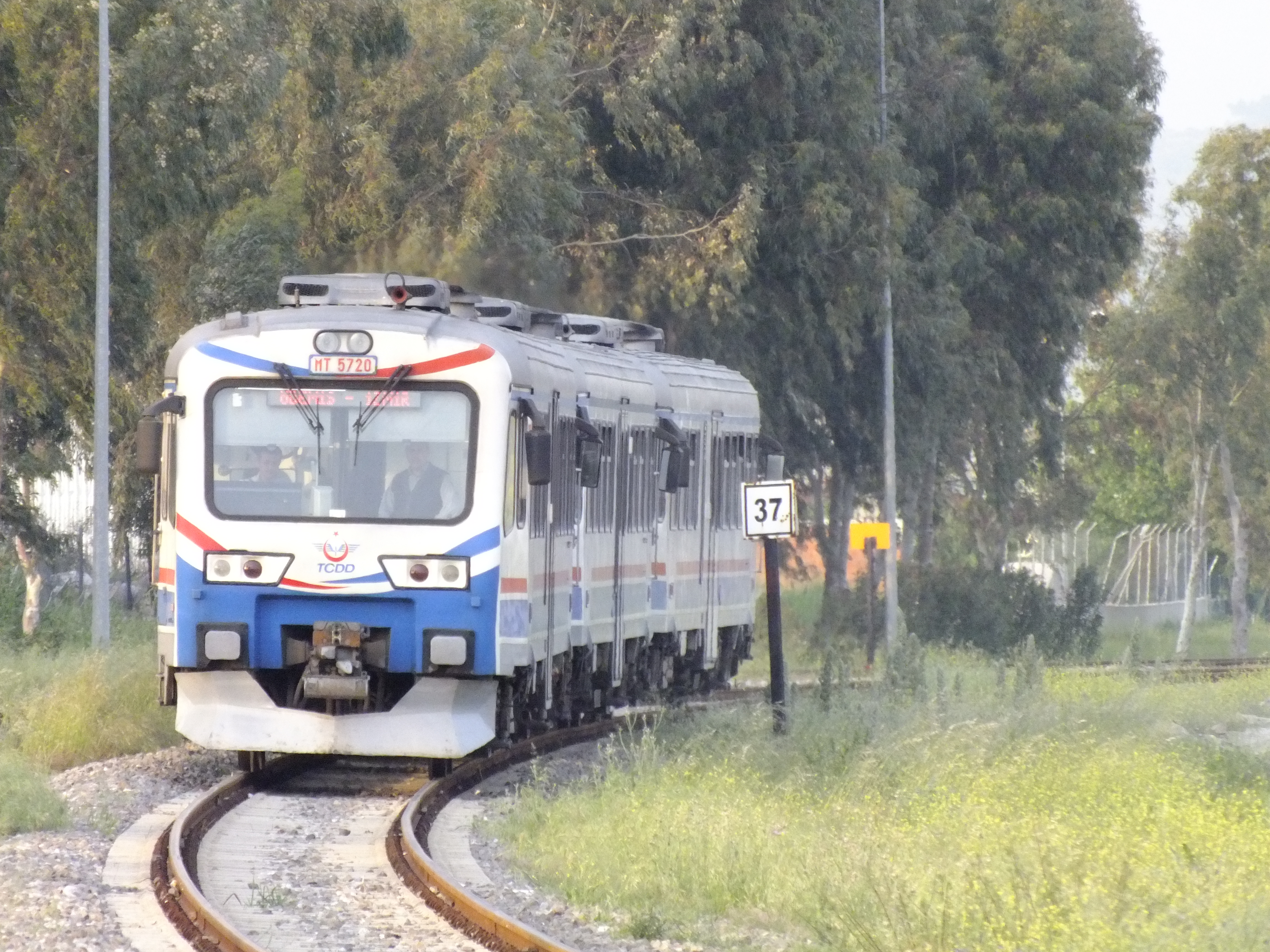
- Northbound train #32342 arriving at Pancar.

Overview
- Service type: Regional rail
- Status: In service
- Locale: Western Anatolia
- Current operator: TCDD Taşımacılık
- Former operator: TCDD

Route
- Termini: İzmir; Ödemiş
- Average journey time: 2 hours, 11 minutes
- Service frequency: 6 roundtrips daily each way, A 7th roundtrip added on summers and holidays

On-board services
- Disabled access: Limited
- Seating arrangements: Coach seating
- Catering facilities: Trolley catering service

Technical
- Rolling stock: TCDD DM15000, TCDD MT5700
- Track gauge: 1,435 mm (4 ft 8 1/2 in)
- Electrification: Under construction
- Operating speed: 120 kilometres per hour (75 mph) Basmane-Torbalı; 90 kilometres per hour (56 mph) Torbalı-Ödemiş
- Track owner: TCDD

The İzmir–Ödemiş Regional (Turkish: Basmane–Ödemiş Bölgesel Ekspresi) is a regional rail service operated by the Turkish State Railways. The trains run between Basmane Terminal in İzmir and the town of Ödemiş, 113km to the south-east.

== History ==
Passenger service between İzmir and Ödemiş dates back to 1884, when the Oriental Railway Company (ORC) built the line. TCDD took over operations in 1935 and operated a train on the route. Service was increased in 1971. In 2006, trains would terminate at Gaziemir, rather than go into İzmir, because of construction, but in 2009 service continued into İzmir once again. In April 2020 the service was suspended due to ongoing COVID 19 pandemic (including İzmir–Tire Regional) but the service has resumed in June 2021).
