= Üçyol (İzmir Metro) =

Metro station in Turkey

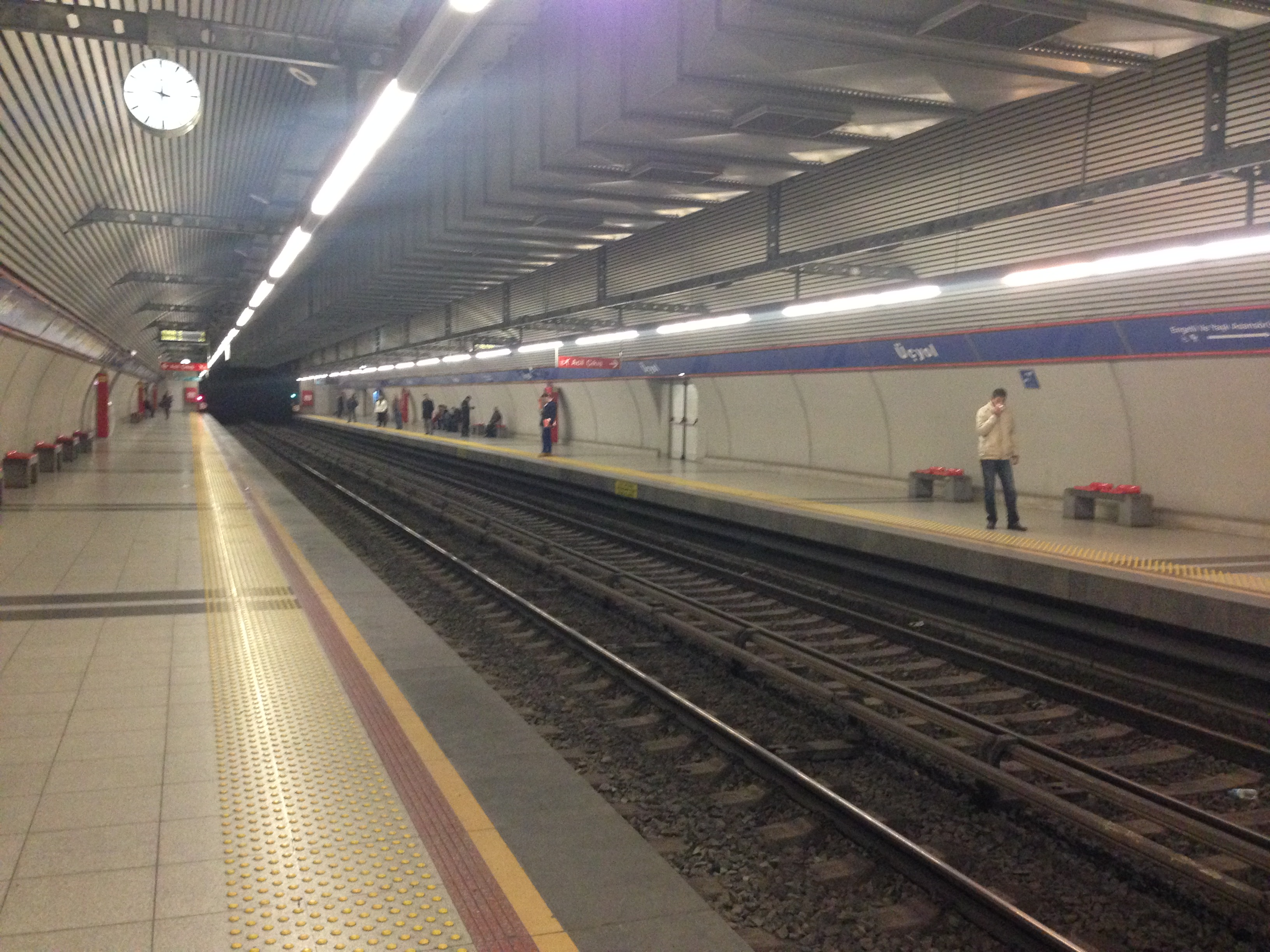

General information
- Location: İnönü Cd., Kılıç Reis Mah., 35360; Konak
- Coordinates: 38.40561°N 27.1202°E
- System: İzmir Metro rapid transit station
- Owner: İzmir Metropolitan Municipality
- Operator: İzmir Metro A.Ş.
- Line: M1 M2
- Platforms: 2 side platforms
- Tracks: 2
- Connections: ESHOT Bus: 15, 16, 18, 19, 20, 84, 89, 92, 108, 124, 156, 490, 520, 523, 524, 556, 588, 823, 950

Construction
- Parking: No
- Cycle facilities: No
- Accessible: Yes

History
- Opened: 22 May 2000; 26 years ago

Services
| Preceding station | İzmir Metro | Following station |
|---|---|---|
| İzmirspor towards Narlıdere Kaymakamlık | M1 | Konak towards Evka 3 |
Future service
| Terminus | M2 | Zafertepe towards Fuar İzmir |
Location

Üçyol is an underground station on the M1 Line of the İzmir Metro in Konak. Located beneath İnönü Avenue, just west of Üçyol Square, it is one of the ten original stations of the metro system, opened on 22 May 2000. From 2000 to the 2012, Üçyol was the western terminus of the line. On 29 December 2012, the line was extended two stations westward to Hatay.

Üçyol is planned to be the western terminus of the Üçyol—Fuar İzmir Line, which is expected to open by 2027. This line will be automatically operated and is expected to become the second driverless metro line in Turkey, after the M5 line in Istanbul.

== Connections ==
ESHOT operates city bus service on İnönü Avenue.

ESHOT Bus service
| Route number | Stop | Route | Location |
|---|---|---|---|
| 15 | Üçyol | İnönü — Konak | İnönü Avenue |
| 16 | Üçyol | Vatan Mahallesi — Üçyol | İnönü Avenue |
| 18 | Üçyol | Yeşilyurt — Konak | İnönü Avenue |
| 19 | Üçyol | Şehitler — Konak | İnönü Avenue |
| 20 | Üçyol | Kooperatif Evleri — Konak | İnönü Avenue |
| 84 | Üçyol | Salih Omurtak — Üçyol Metro | İnönü Avenue |
| 89 | Üçyol | Cennetoğlu — Üçyol Metro | İnönü Avenue |
| 92 | Üçyol | Fuar İzmir — Üçyol | İnönü Avenue |
| 108 | Üçyol | Eserkent — Üçyol Metro | İnönü Avenue |
| 124 | Üçyol | Ali Fuat Erden — Üçyol Metro | İnönü Avenue |
| 156 | Üçyol | Sağlık Ocağı — Üçyol Metro | İnönü Avenue |
| 490 | Üçyol | Tınaztepe — Üçyol | İnönü Avenue |
| 520 | Üçyol | Salih Omurtak — Üçyol Metro | İnönü Avenue |
| 523 | Üçyol | Uzundere — Üçyol Metro | İnönü Avenue |
| 524 | Üçyol | Cennetçeşme — Üçyol Metro | İnönü Avenue |
| 556 | Üçyol | Çamlık — Üçyol Metro | İnönü Avenue |
| 588 | Üçyol | Yeni Çamlık — Konak | İnönü Avenue |
| 823 | Üçyol | Üçyol — Gaziemir Semt Garajı | İnönü Avenue |
| 950 | Üçyol | Narlıdere — Konak | İnönü Avenue |
