= Fuar İzmir (İzmir Metro) =

General information
- Location: Zafer Mah., 35410; Gaziemir
- Coordinates: 38.348056°N 27.123889°E
- System: İzmir Metro rapid transit station
- Owner: İzmir Metropolitan Municipality
- Operator: İzmir Metro A.Ş.
- Line: M2 M3
- Platforms: 1 island platform
- Tracks: 2

Construction
- Accessible: Yes

History
- Opening: 2027; 1 year's time (expected)

Services
Preceding station	İzmir Metro	Following station
Future service
Semt Garajı towards Üçyol	M2	Terminus
ESBAŞ towards Menderes	M3	Altan Aydın towards Konak
Location

Fuar İzmir is a proposed underground station and the southern terminus of the Üçyol—Fuar İzmir Line of the İzmir Metro. It will be located beneath Fuar İzmir in Zafer, Gaziemir. Construction of the station began in 2025. The station will also be a part of the proposed Konak—Menderes Line of the İzmir Metro.
