= İzmir–Tire Regional =

Regional rail in Turkey

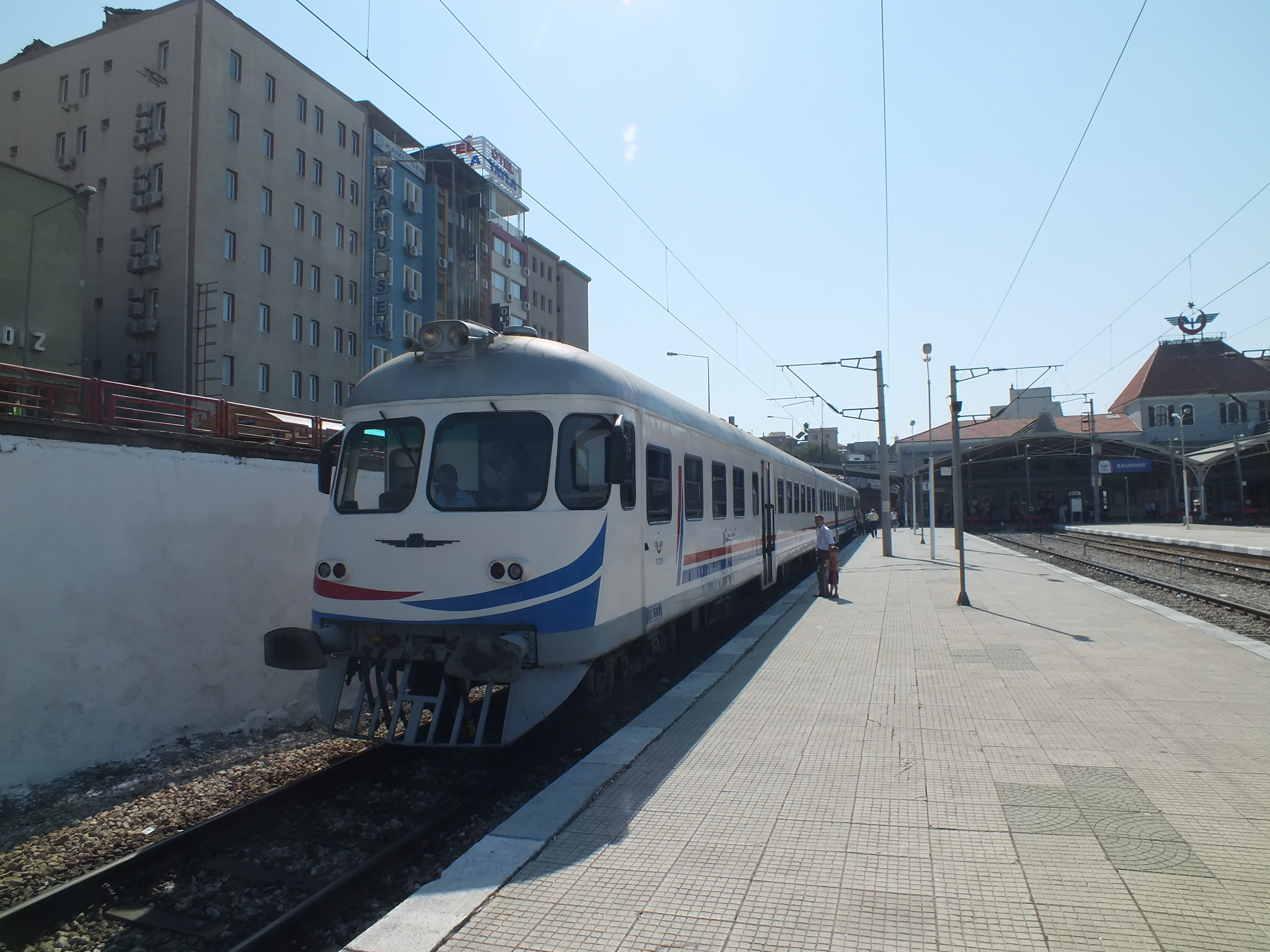
- Train #32413 waiting to depart Basmane Terminal.

Overview
- Service type: Regional rail
- Status: In service
- Locale: Western Anatolia
- Current operator: TCDD Taşımacılık
- Former operator: TCDD

Route
- Termini: İzmir Basmane; Tire
- Distance travelled: 96 km (60 mi)
- Average journey time: 1 hour, 30 minutes
- Service frequency: 5 trains daily each way

On-board services
- Disabled access: Limited
- Seating arrangements: Coach seating
- Catering facilities: No

Technical
- Rolling stock: TCDD DM15000, TCDD MT5700, TCDD DM30000
- Track gauge: 1,435 mm (4 ft 8 1/2 in)
- Electrification: Under construction
- Operating speed: 90 km/h (56 mph)
- Track owner: Turkish State Railways

The İzmir–Tire Regional, numbered as B36, is a 96-kilometre-long (60 mi) regional rail service operated by the Turkish State Railways, between Basmane Terminal in İzmir and Tire. Four trains operate daily each way; trains 32415, 32417, 32413, 32419 operate southbound from Basmane to Tire, while trains 32412, 32416, 32418, 32420 operate northbound from Tire to Basmane. The route is the third-busiest regional route in district 3 after the İzmirÖdemiş Regional and the İzmir–Denizli Regional. The trip takes about 2 hours and costs about ₺68 to ₺136 Turkish Lira (Equivalent to US$2–4) per person.

The current rolling stock that operates on the line are DM15000, MT5700 or M30000.
