= TÜRASAŞ =

Turkish national train operator

Türkiye Raylı Sistem Araçları Sanayii A.Ş. TÜRASAŞ
- Type: Anonim şirket
- Industry: Rail transport
- Predecessor: TÜLOMSAŞ, TÜVASAŞ, TÜDEMSAŞ
- Founded: 4 March 2020; 6 years ago
- Headquarters: Ankara, Turkey
- Area served: Turkey
- Key people: Mustafa Metin Yazar (General Director)
- Products: Locomotive & Wagon construction
- Owner: Turkish Government (100% - Ministry of Transport and Infrastructure
- Website: https://www.turasas.gov.tr/

TÜRASAŞ (Turkish: Türkiye Raylı Sistem Araçları Sanayii Anonim Şirketi) is a railway manufacturer based in Ankara resulted in the merging of TÜLOMSAŞ, TÜVASAŞ and TÜDEMSAŞ, announced in the Official Gazette of the Republic of Turkey on 4 March 2020.

After the forming of TÜRARAŞ, TÜLOMSAŞ TÜVASAŞ and TÜDEMSAŞ were dissolved, and all respective facilities were handed to TÜRASAŞ.

== Products ==
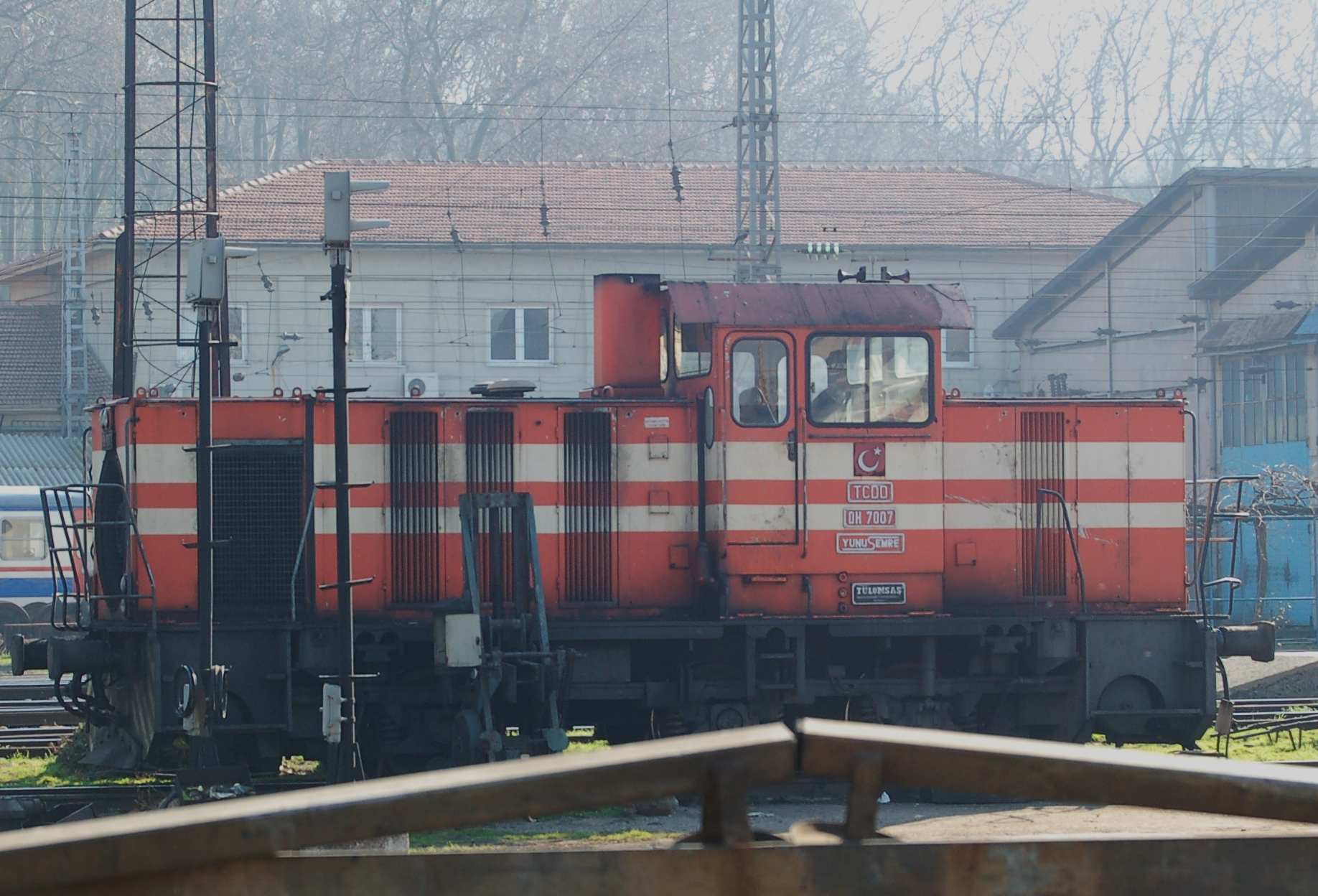
TCDD DH7007 shunter at Sirkeci, Istanbul, Turkey

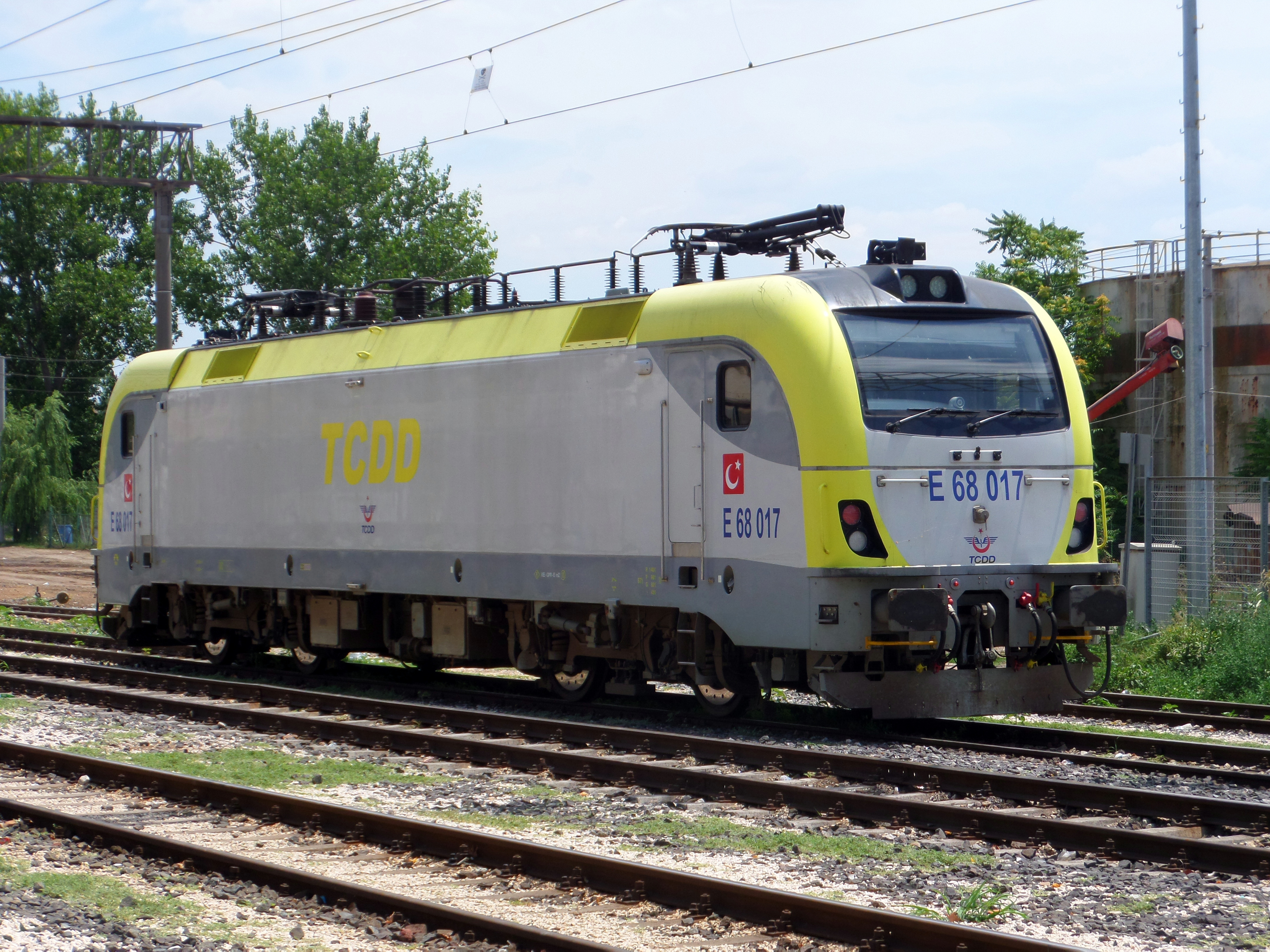
A TCDD E68000 at Alpullu Gar

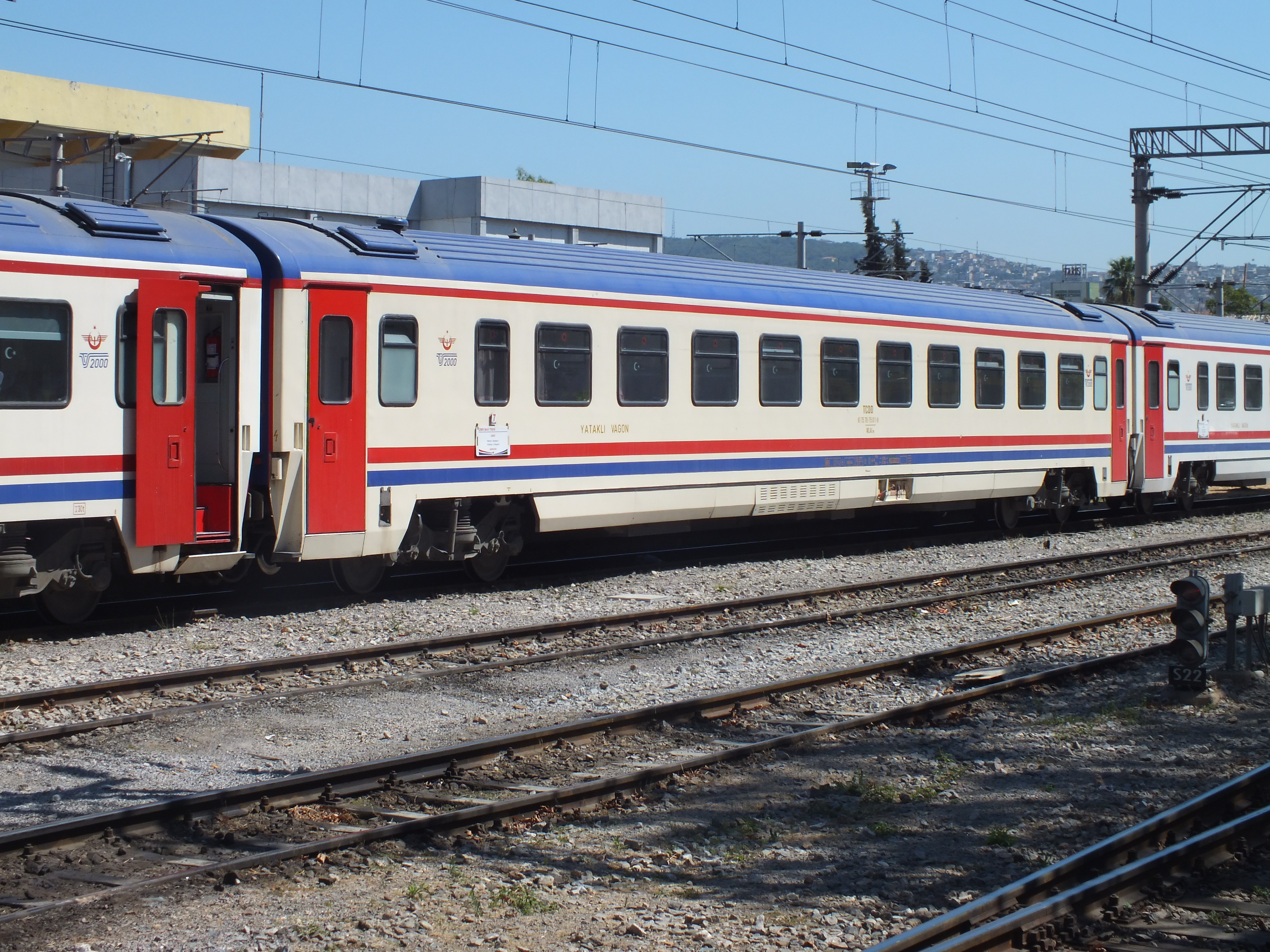
A set of TVS2000 railcars at Alsancak station.

Trainsets

- DMU Diesel Trainsets
- E44000

Locomotives

- E68000
- DE36000
- E1000
- DH7000
- DH10000
- DH12000
- DE10000
- DE10000K
- DE6000K
- E5000

Passenger Wagons

- TVS2000 Series
- Modernized Wagons

Diesel Motors

- TLM 16V 185 Diesel Motor
- TLM 6V 185 Diesel Motor
- 1500 kW Generator Set

Traction Motors

- AC Traction Motor
- DC Traction Motor

== See also ==
- Turkish State Railways
- TCDD Taşımacılık
- Rail transport in Turkey
- Yüksek Hızlı Tren
