= TCDD DE18100 =

Class of Turkish diesel-electric locomotives

DE18100
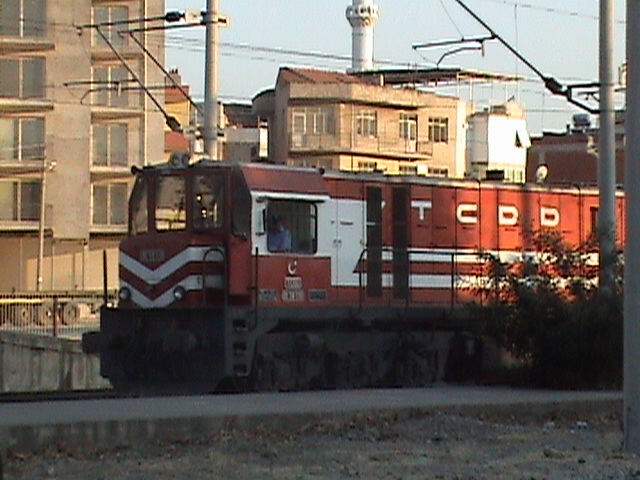
- DE18110 at Menemen Station
Type and origin
- Power type: Diesel-electric
- Designer: Adapted from TCDD DE18000
- Builder: Matériel de Traction Electrique
- Build date: 1978
- Total produced: 20
Specifications
- Configuration
  - AAR: A1A-A1A
  - UIC: (A1A)(A1A)
- Gauge: 1,435 mm (4 ft 8 1/2 in)
- Bogies: 2
- Wheel diameter: 1,100 mm (43 in)
- Length: 16.44 m (53 ft 11 in)
- Width: 2.7 m (8 ft 10 in)
- Height: 4.153 m (13 ft 8 in)
- Loco weight: 81 tonnes (80 long tons; 89 short tons)
- Engine type: Pielstick
- Aspiration: Turbocharged
- Cylinders: 12
- Transmission: AC-DC
- Loco brake: Air
- Train brakes: Air
- Safety systems: same as TCDD DE24000
Performance figures
- Maximum speed: 120 km/h (75 mph)
- Power output: 1,320 kW (1,770 hp)
- Tractive effort
  - Starting: 263kN
  - Continuous: 240kN @ 20 km/h
Career
- Operators: Turkish State Railways
- Numbers: DE18101 – DE18120
- Locale: İzmir

TCDD DE18100 are a type of diesel-electric road switcher built for operations on Turkish State Railways by Matériel de Traction Electrique. Based on the same platform and order as the DE24000, it was a light-axle version of the locomotive, very similar to the DE18000, though with a different wheel arrangement. The units have mostly been used around İzmir. They previously pulled Denizli–İzmir regional trains. Now they are used in shunting operations along with TCDD DE24000. DE 18 105 and DE 18 110 are the only remaining running units, DE 18 103 is revised from DE 18 003, all others are scrapped.
