= TCDD E 43000 =

TCDD E43000
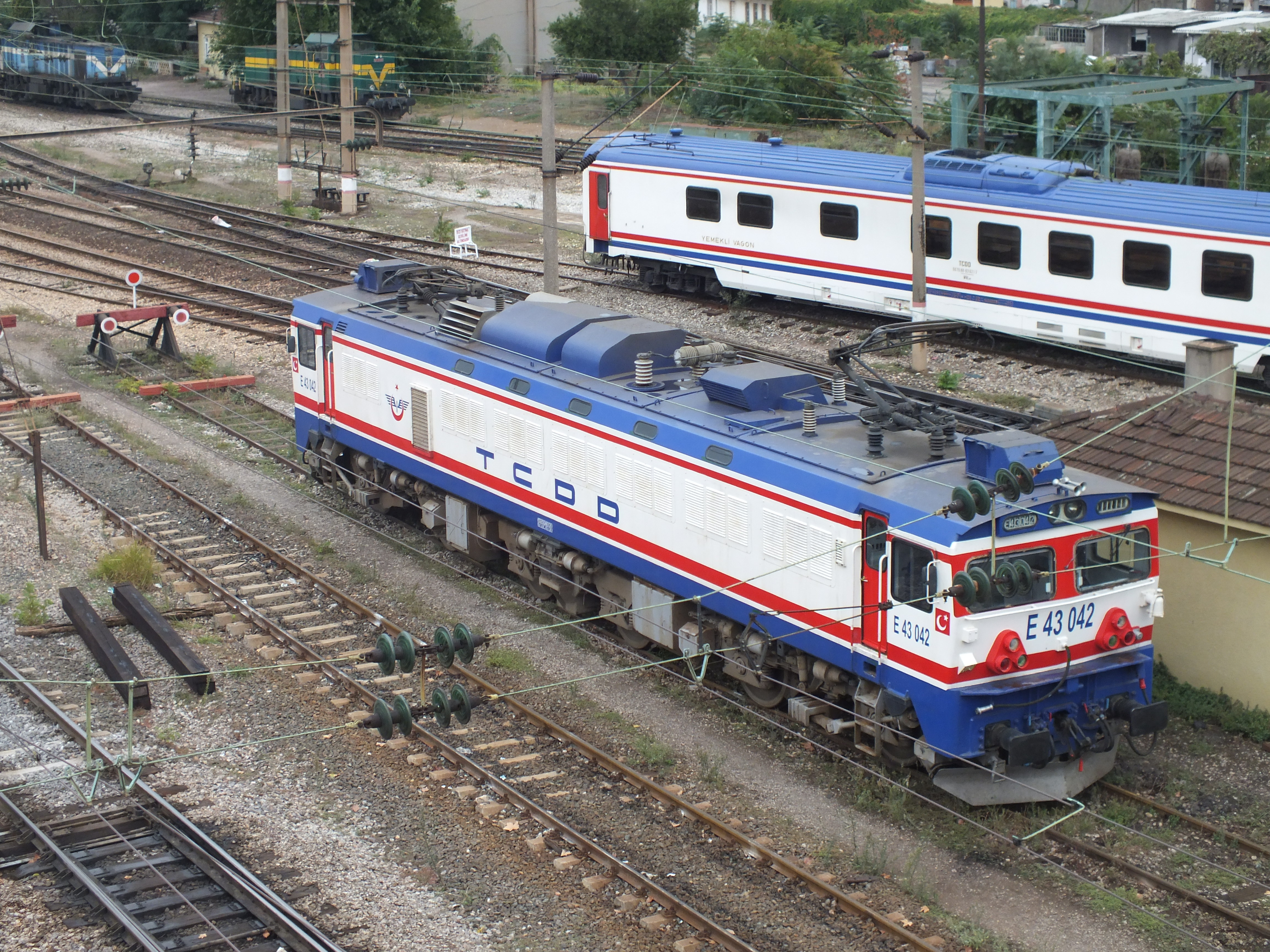
- TCDD E43 042 at Haydarpaşa.
Type and origin
- Power type: Electric
- Designer: Toshiba
- Builder: Toshiba, Tülomsaş
- Build date: 1988
- Total produced: 45
Specifications
- Configuration
  - AAR: B-B-B
  - UIC: Bo'Bo'Bo'
- Gauge: 1,435 mm (4 ft 8 1/2 in)
- Length: 20.24 m (66 ft 5 in)
- Loco weight: 120 tonnes (120 long tons; 130 short tons)
- Electric system/s: 25 kV 50 Hz AC Catenary
- Current pickup: Pantograph
Performance figures
- Maximum speed: 90 km/h (56 mph)(some units); 130 km/h (81 mph) (remaining units); Units have two different final drive ratios fixed at manufacturing
- Power output: 3,180 kW (4,260 hp)
- Tractive effort: 275 kN (62,000 lbf)
Career
- Operators: Turkish State Railways (1987–2016); TCDD Taşımacılık (2016–); Omsan (2017–)
- Numbers: E43001 – E43045

The TCDD E43000 is a twin-cab six-axle Bo-Bo-Bo electric locomotive used previously by the Turkish State Railways and currently by TCDD Taşımacılık in Turkey. The locomotives were designed by Toshiba and built by TÜLOMSAŞ at their Eskişehir shops. The locomotive is based on the JNR Class EF63 electric locomotive in Japan, built by Toshiba. The Turkish State Railways ordered 45 locomotives as part of the railways electrification program of the late-1980s early-1990s.

TCDD ordered the locomotives to be used on the Istanbul-Ankara railway and later for freight operations on the Divriği to İskenderun iron ore route. Used both for passenger and freight operations, the E43000 has since become one of Turkey's most recognizable locomotives and one of two electric main-line locomotives in use today, together with the E68000. Due to the locomotive's original designer, they have been nicknamed "Toshibas" by railfans in Turkey.

== History ==
During the 1980s, TCDD's network was largely diesel-operated, with the exception of suburban railways in Istanbul and Ankara as well as the westernmost 139.8 km (86.9 mi) section of the Istanbul-Ankara railway. In the late 1980s however the State Railways began electrifying the whole Istanbul to Ankara line with plans to electrify other mainlines as well. When electrification was complete, the railways' then fleet of electric locomotives would not be enough to operate the higher capacity of trains. Together with the E8000 and E14000 EMUs, the railways' operated three ageing E4000 series electric locomotives on the Istanbul suburban line and 15 E40000 series electric locomotives on the Haydarpaşa suburban and Ankara suburban lines as well as on regional trains from Istanbul to Adapazarı.

In 1987 the Turkish State Railways ordered an electric locomotive from Toshiba, which built one model and sent it to Turkey. In 1988. Following a licensing agreement, TÜLOMSAŞ built 44 more in the following years. The locomotives entered service on the Istanbul-Ankara railway in 1989, when electrification was extended from Arifiye to Eskişehir. Electrification of the whole railway line was completed four years later on 26 December 1993, allowing the E43000s to make the full journey between Istanbul and Ankara. The next year, the locomotives began freight train operations in eastern Turkey between the iron ore mines in Divriği and the port city of İskenderun, on the Mediterranean Sea, along with the İsdemir steel plant just north of İskenderun. A few years later, in 1997, TCDD electrified their European mainline from Istanbul to Edirne, and a portion of the E43000s began operations there. By the end of 1990s, TCDD's electrified network had more than tripled and the E43000s were not enough to meet the demand. So in 1998, TCDD leased 20 JŽ class 441 electric locomotives from Croatia and reclassified them as the E52500. The E52500s took over most passenger operations on Turkey's electrified railways, while the E43000 continued hauling mostly freight; but it was not uncommon for the E43000 to also pull passenger trains, especially between Istanbul and Ankara.

By 2006, all but three E40000 locomotives were retired and the lease for the E52500s were nearing its end. Once the remaining E40000s were retired and the E52500s were sent back to Croatia in 2011, the E43000 became the only operating electric locomotive in Turkey. Demand wasn't as high as before, due to the opening of the Istanbul-Ankara high-speed railway and the discontinuation of all non-high speed passenger trains between Istanbul and Ankara, however TCDD was underway with the electrification of several new railways, from İzmir to Eskişehir and Bandırma as well as from Toprakkale to Mersin. In preparation, the State Railways ordered 80 new electric locomotives in 2013, the first of which began operations in late-2015. The E68000 took over all passenger operations and a majority of freight operations.

The E43000 made history in late-2017 when 15 locomotives were leased from TCDD to Omsan Lojistik to run between Divriği to İskenderun on Turkey's first private common carrier railway since 1935. Today, the E43000s mostly operate heavy ore trains between Divriği and İskenderun.

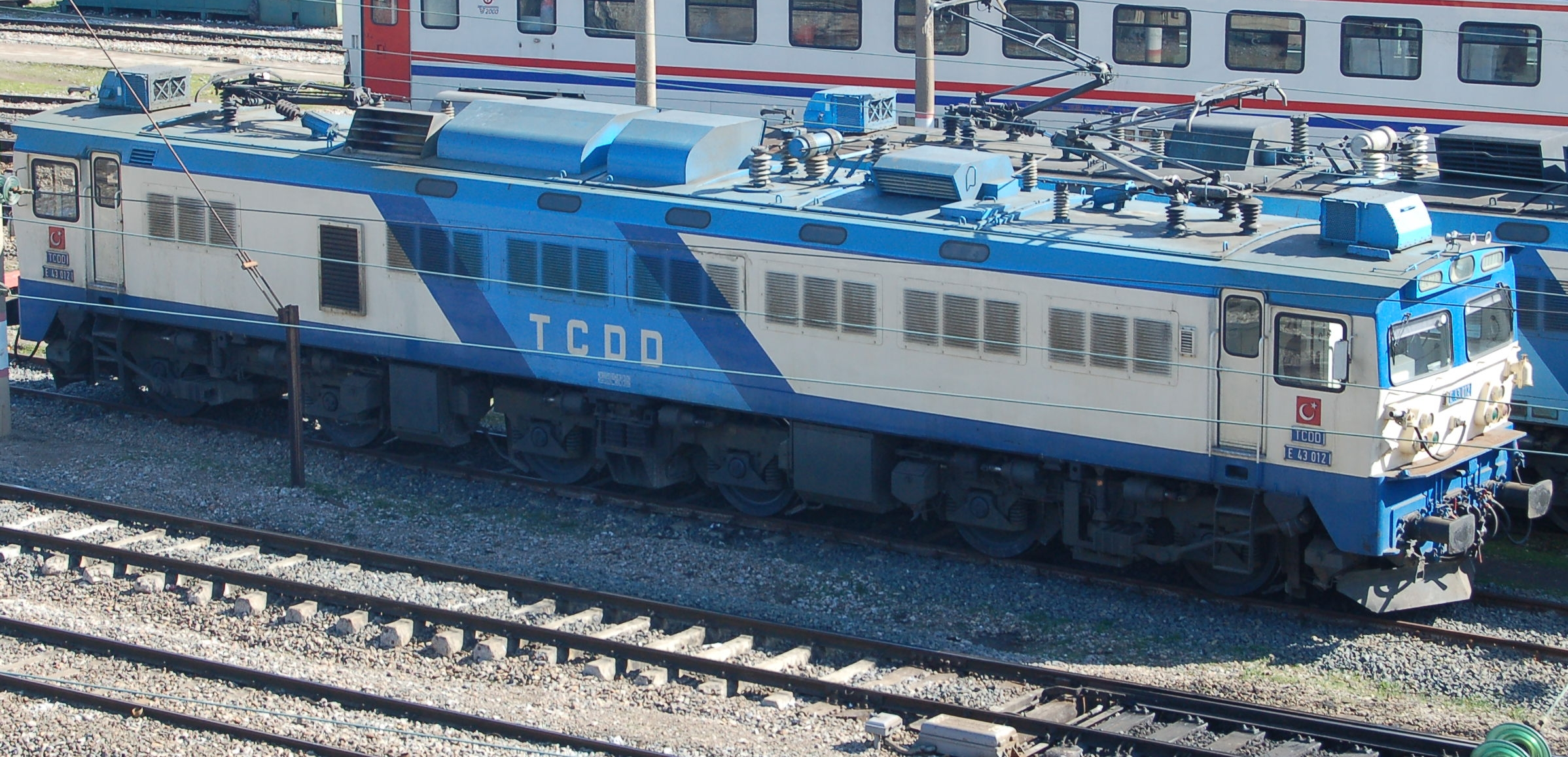
TCDD E43 012 with its original livery at Haydarpaşa yard.

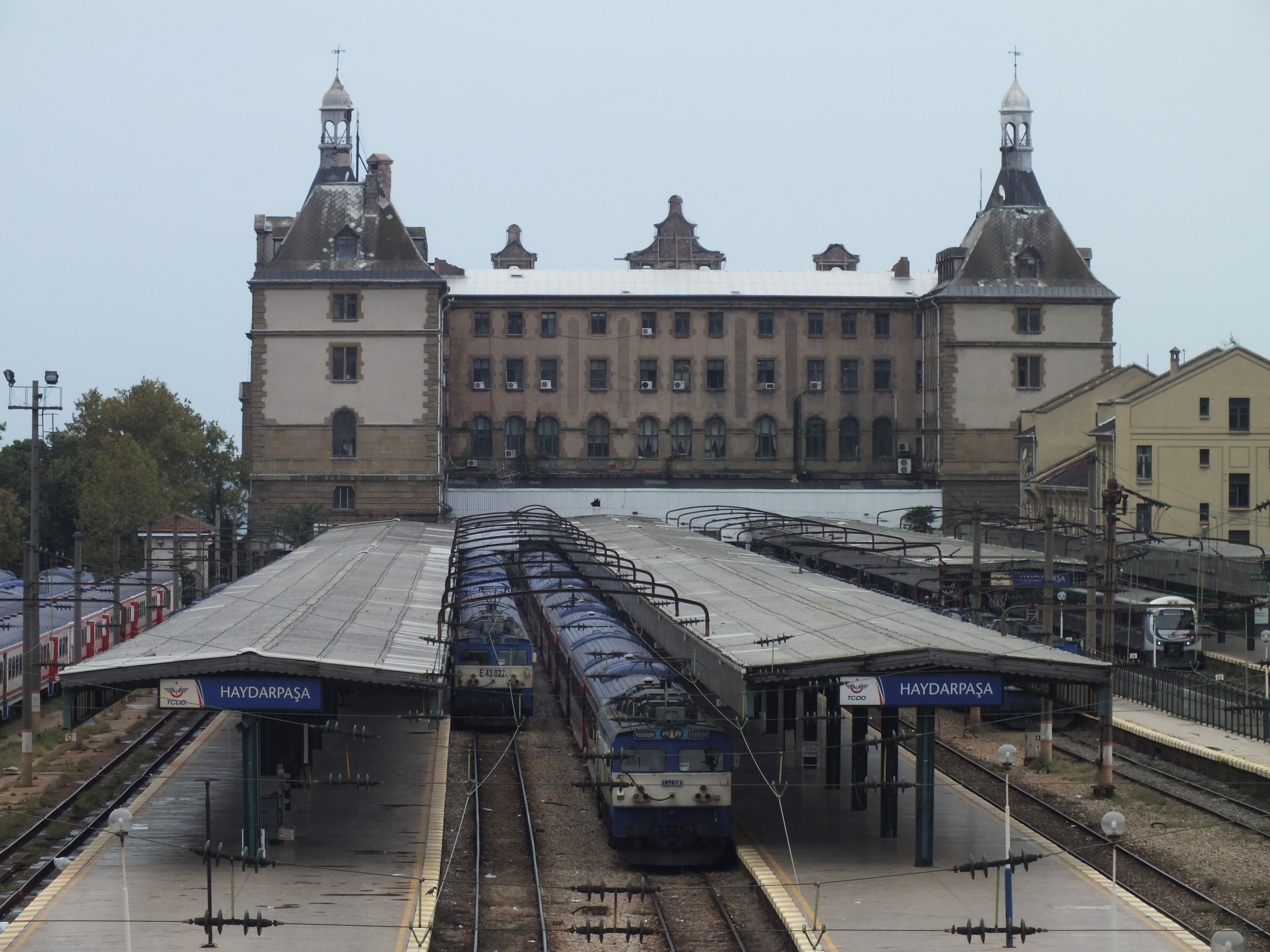
E43 022 and E43 022 waiting depart Haydarpaşa station.

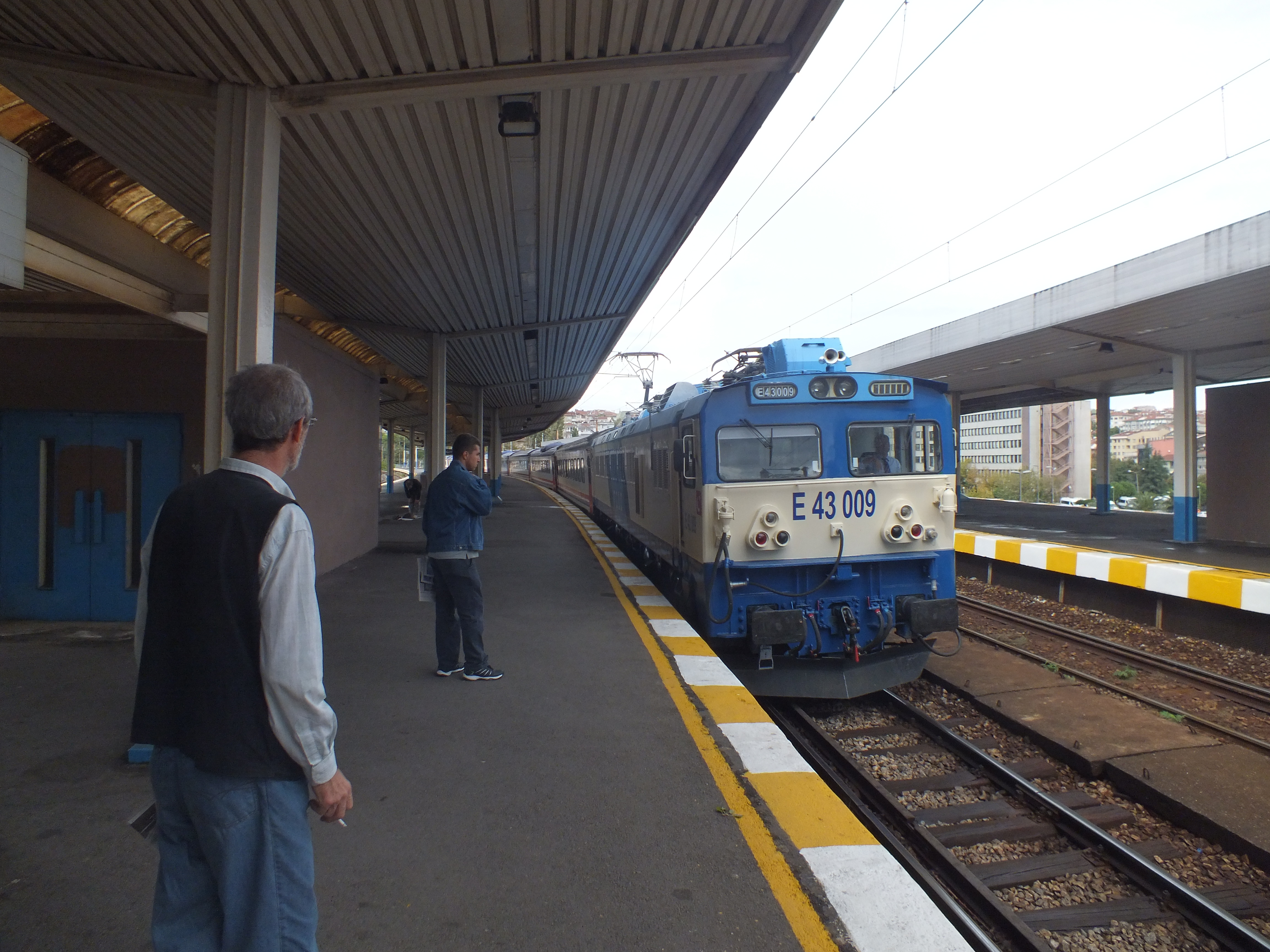
E43 009 leads an intercity train into Söğütlüçeşme station.

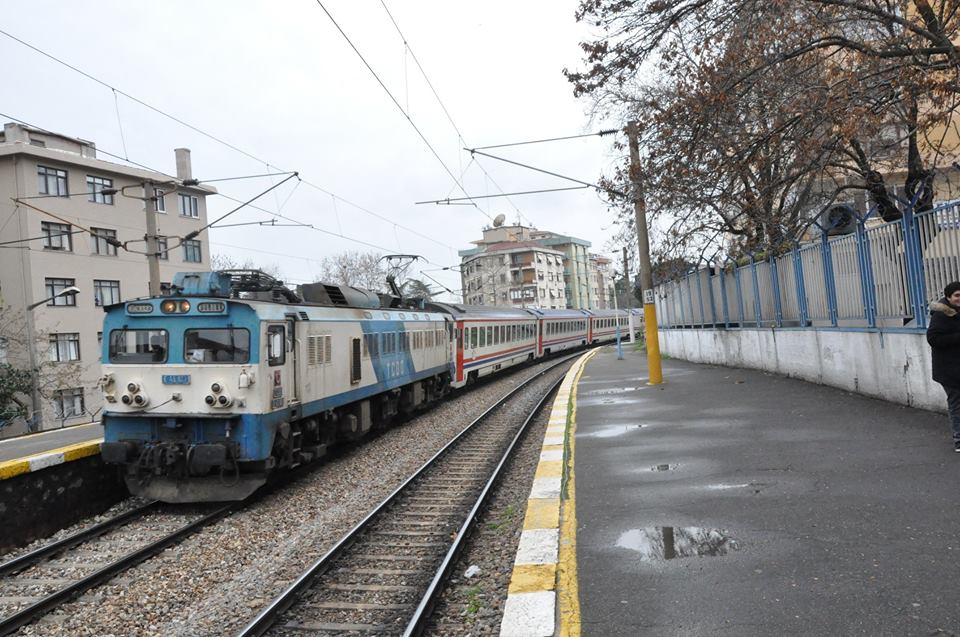
An unidentified E43000 leads the Boğaziçi Express through Kartal station.

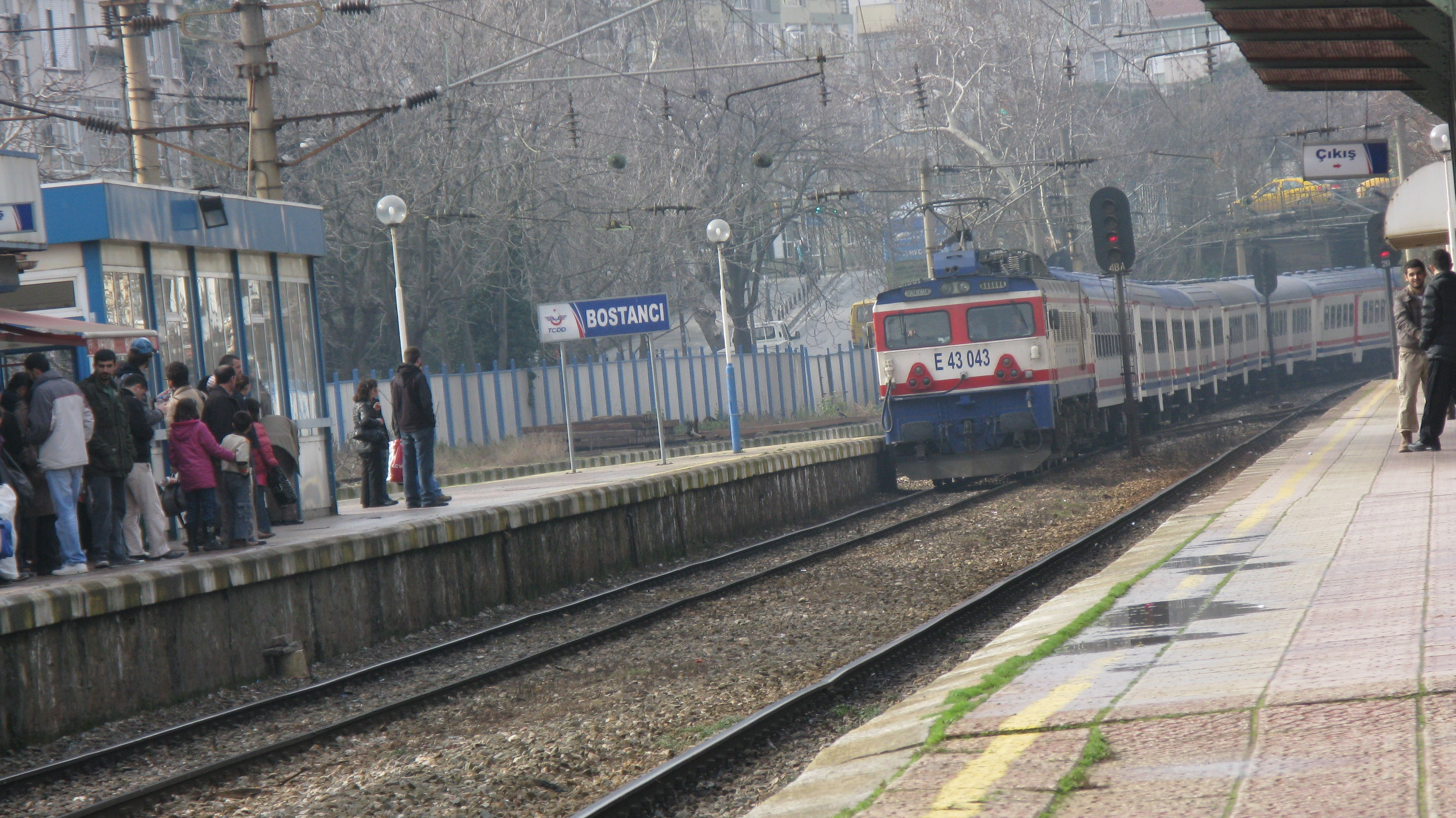
Adapazarı Express, led by a TCDD E 43000 locomotive, arrives at Bostancı rail station.

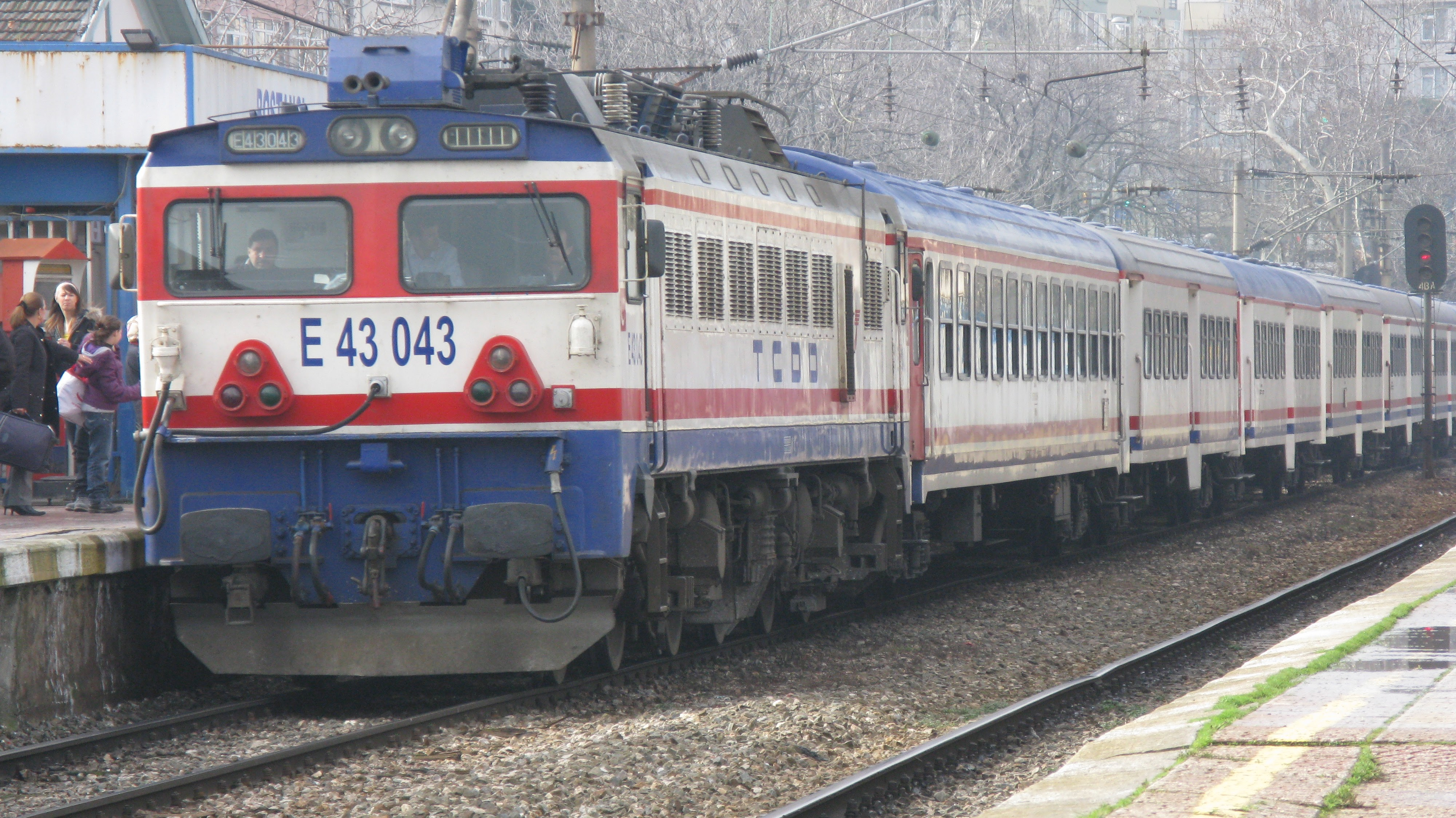
Adapazarı Express, led by a TCDD E 43000 locomotive, at Bostancı rail station.
