= TCDD DE33000 =

DE 33000
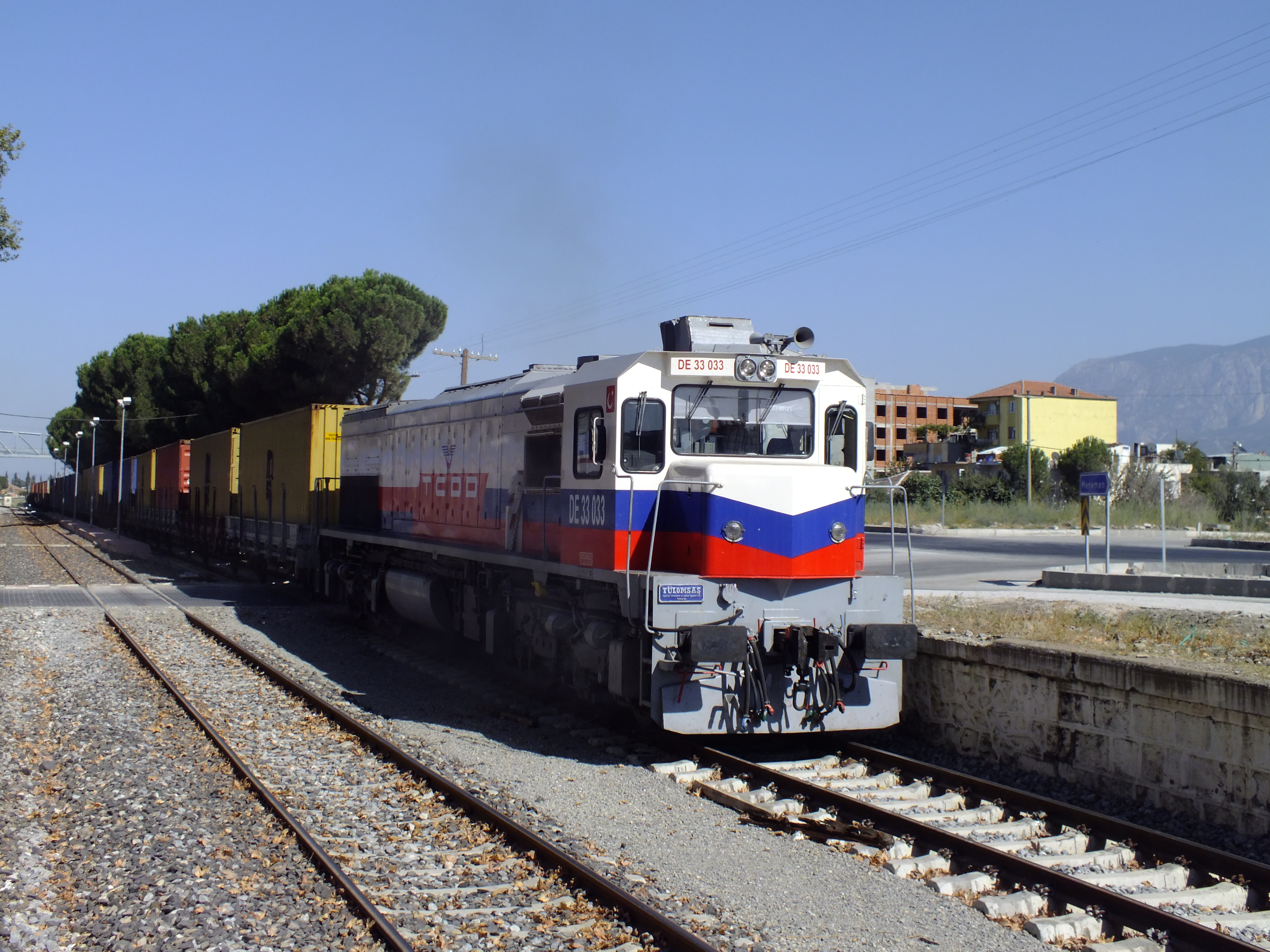
- DE 33 033 pulling a container freight through Muradiye.
Type and origin
- Power type: Diesel-electric
- Designer: Electro-Motive Diesel
- Builder: Tülomsaş
- Model: EMD GT26CW-2
- Build date: 2003 – 2010
- Total produced: 89
Specifications
- Configuration
  - AAR: C-C
  - UIC: Co'Co'
- Gauge: 1,435 mm (4 ft 8 1/2 in)
- Bogies: 2
- Wheel diameter: 1,016 mm (40 in)
- Wheelbase: 43 ft 6 in (13.259 m) between bolsters truck pivots; 13 ft 7 in (4.14 m) between axles in each truck.
- Length: 62 ft 1.7 in (18,941 mm) over the coupler pulling faces.
- Width: 10 ft 3.125 in (3,127.38 mm) over the grabirons.
- Height: 13 ft 11 in (4,240 mm)
- Loco weight: 119 t (117 long tons; 131 short tons)
- Fuel capacity: 4,542 L (999 imp gal; 1,200 US gal)
- Prime mover: EMD 16-645E3C
- RPM range: 360-904
  - RPM low idle: 225
  - RPM idle: 316
  - Maximum RPM: 1007
- Engine type: Two-stroke turbodiesel
- Aspiration: Turbocharged
- Cylinders: 16
- Transmission: AC-DC-AC
- Loco brake: Air, Dynamic brake
- Train brakes: Air
- Safety systems: Engine overspeeding protection, emergency brake
Performance figures
- Maximum speed: 131 km/h (81 mph)
- Power output: 2,463 kW (3,300 hp)
- Tractive effort
  - Starting: 380kN
  - Continuous: 344kN @ 20 km/h
Career
- Operators: TCDD Taşımacılık
- Numbers: DE33001 – DE33089
- Nicknames: Otuz üç binlikler(thirty three thousands)

TCDD DE 33000 is a type of diesel-electric locomotive built for operations on Turkish State Railways by Tülomsaş. It is model GT26CW-2 designed by General Motors Electro-Motive Diesel and using the famous EMD 645 two stroke diesel engine and using the EMD Dash 2 electronic module. It has been revised to have EMD Dash 3 like microprocessor control in 2017. This batch has air starter.

Total initial order was for 65 units, followed by supplemental orders to increase the quantity to 89, with delivery starting in 2003. Its name refers to its maximum power output, 3,300 hp (2,500 kW).
