= TCDD DH9500 =

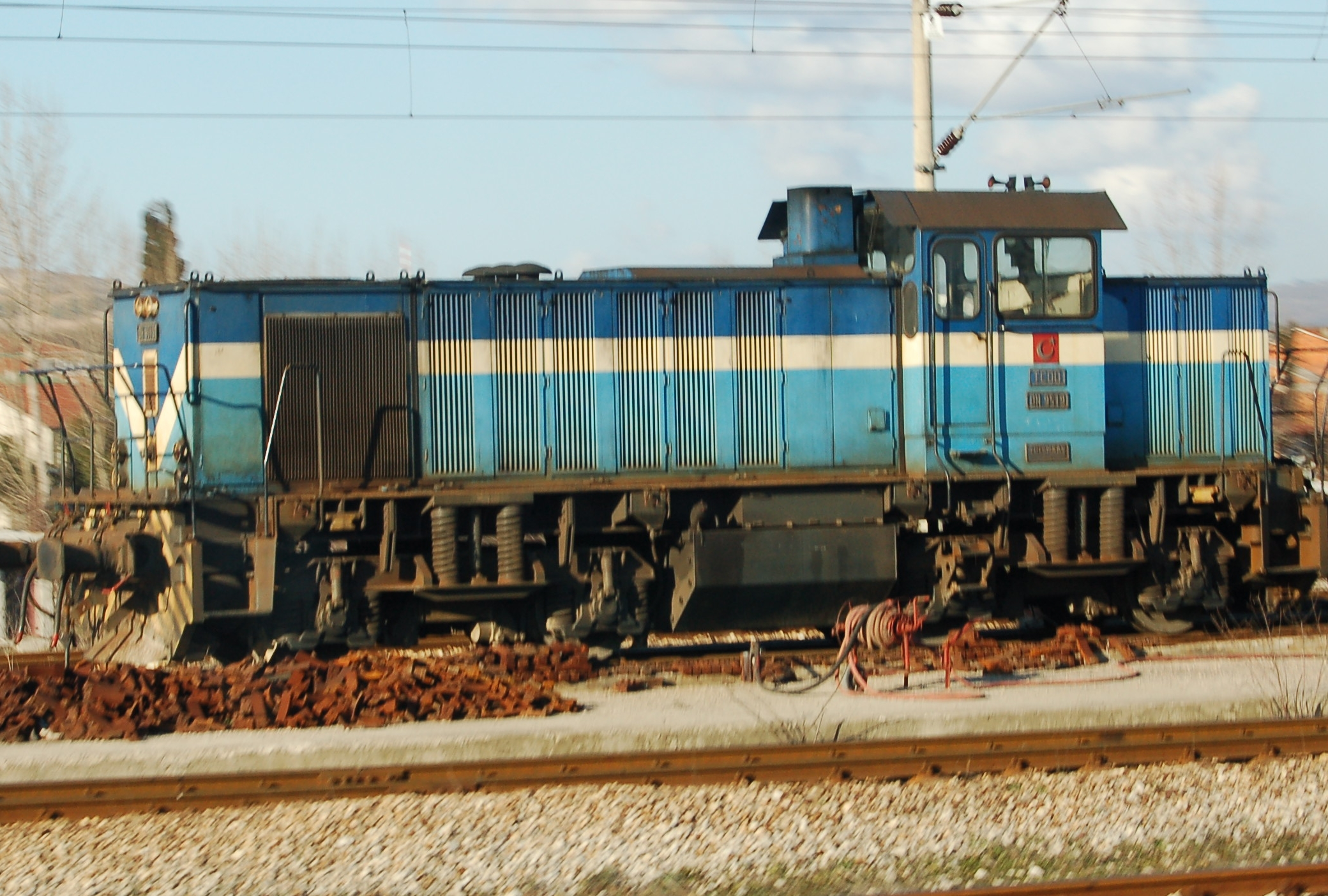
- TDCC DH9519 in Sirkeci, Istanbul, Turkey. February 23, 2008
Type and origin
- Power type: Diesel-Hydraulic
- Builder: Tülomsaş
- Build date: 1999
- Total produced: 26
Specifications
- Configuration
  - UIC: B'B'
- Gauge: 1,435 mm (4 ft 8 1/2 in)
- Bogies: 2
- Length: 13.25 m (43 ft 6 in)
- Loco weight: 68 tonnes (67 long tons; 75 short tons)
- Fuel type: Diesel
- Prime mover: MTU 8V 396 TC 13
- Aspiration: Turbocharged
- Cylinders: 8
- Transmission: Hydromechanic, two-speed reduction box after Voith L3r3
- Loco brake: Air, Parking pawl, Retarder
- Train brakes: Air
Performance figures
- Maximum speed: 80 km/h (50 mph)
- Power output: 700 kW (939 hp)
Career
- Operators: Turkish State Railways
- Numbers: DH9501 – DH9526
- Locale: Turkey except İzmir

TCDD DH9500 is a diesel-hydraulic locomotive operated by the Turkish State Railways (TCDD). A total of 26 units were delivered from 1999 by Tülomsaş. They are a hydraulic derivative of DE11000 delivered in the 1980s.
