= EMD GT26CW-2 =

American locomotive

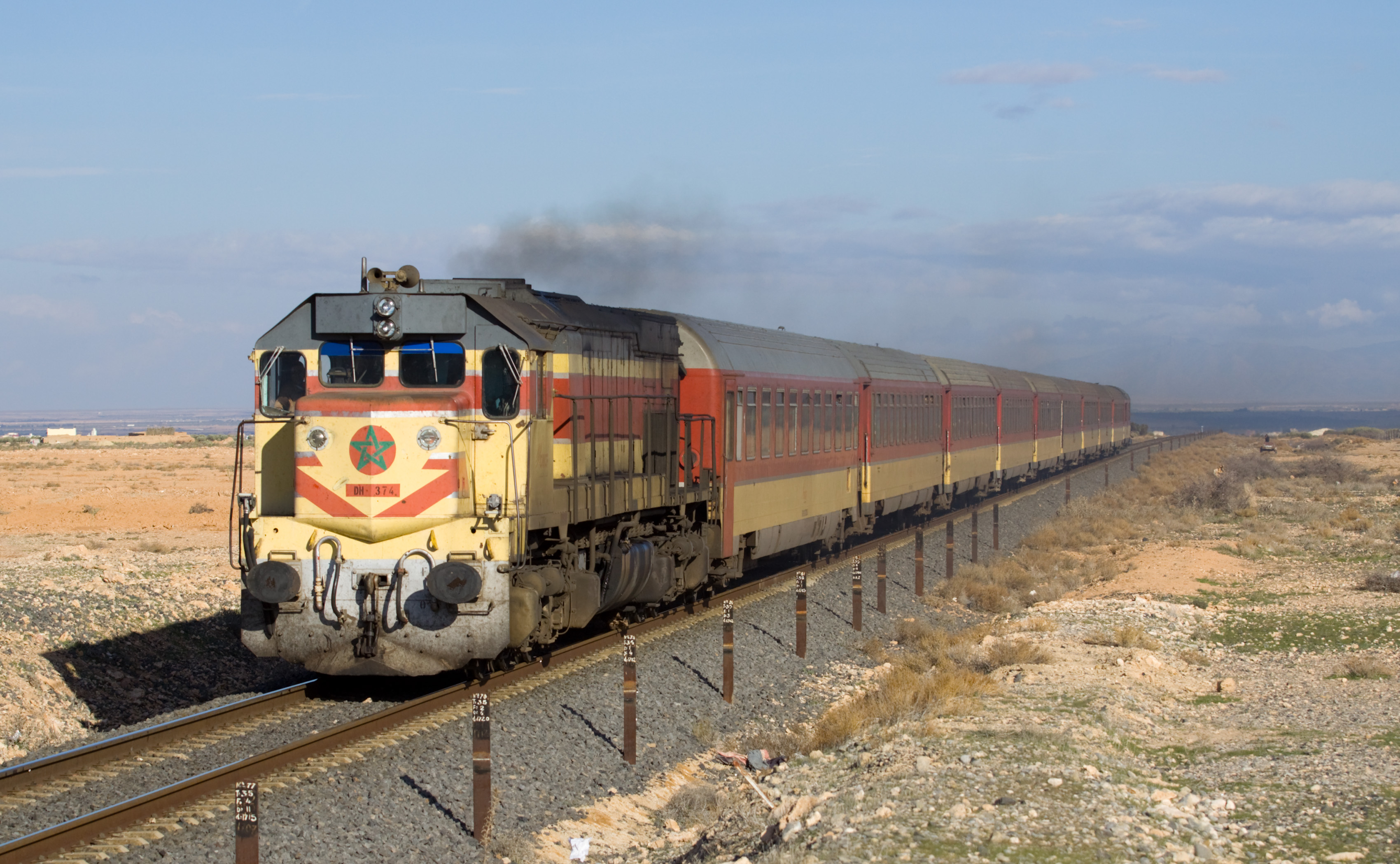
- ONCF class DH 370
Type and origin
- Power type: Diesel–electric
- Builder: General Motors Diesel Division, Türkiye Lokomotif ve Motor Sanayii A.Ş., Electro-Motive Division (EMD), Hyundai Rotem.
- Model: GT26CW-2
- Build date: September 1972–2006
- Total produced: 481
Specifications
- Configuration
  - AAR: C-C
  - UIC: Co′Co′
  - Commonwealth: Co-Co
- Gauge: 4 ft 8 1/2 in (1,435 mm)
- Trucks: 6-Wheel
- Wheel diameter: 40 in (1,000 mm)
- Minimum curve: 24°
- Wheelbase: 13 ft 7 in (4,140 mm) between axles in each truck
- Pivot centres: 43 ft 6 in (13,260 mm) between bolsters truck pivots
- Length
  - Over couplers: 62 ft 1.7 in (18,941 mm)
- Width: 10 ft 3.125 in (3,127.38 mm)) over the grabirons
- Height: 13 ft 11 in (4,240 mm)
- Loco weight: 120 t (120 long tons; 130 short tons)
- Fuel type: Diesel
- Fuel capacity: 1,700–3,200 US gal (6,400–12,100 L; 1,400–2,700 imp gal)
- Lubricant cap.: 243 US gal (920 L; 202 imp gal)
- Coolant cap.: 295 US gal (1,120 L; 246 imp gal)
- Sandbox cap.: 9 ft^{3} (250 L)
- Prime mover: EMD 16-645E3 (2 Stroke V Engine design)
- RPM range: 334-904
  - RPM low idle: 225
  - RPM idle: 316
  - Maximum RPM: 1000
- Engine type: V16 diesel engine
- Aspiration: Turbocharged & Supercharged (Optional)
- Alternator: GM D18
- Generator: Main: GM - AR6; Auxiliary: Delco A8102
- Traction motors: GM - D77 (6)
- Cylinders: 16
- Cylinder size: 9.02 in (229 mm) x 10 in (250 mm)
- Gear ratio: 62:15
- MU working: Yes
- Train heating: Vapor Clarkson Boiler #4625 (@ 2,500 lbf (1,100 kgf)/hr)
- Train brakes: Westinghouse 24RL (Air Brake)
Performance figures
- Maximum speed: 65–95 mph (105–153 km/h)
- Power output: 3,000–3,300 hp (2,200–2,500 kW)
- Tractive effort
  - Starting: 46,750 lbf (21,210 kgf) @ 25%
  - Continuous: 43,120 lbf (19,560 kgf) @ 12 mph (19 km/h)
Career
- Operators: Various
- Nicknames: "Karavela" (Yugoslavia) "특대 :(The Great Giant)" (South Korea)
- Locale: Iran, Israel, Morocco, Pakistan, Peru, South Korea, Turkey, Yugoslavia

The GT26CW-2 is the Dash-2 variant of the GT26CW diesel–electric locomotive series created by the Electro-Motive Division (EMD) of General Motors for export to Iran, Israel, Morocco, Pakistan, Peru, South Korea, Turkey and Yugoslavia. Various licensees have also constructed or refurbished this model. It is similar to the highly successful SD40-2 North American locomotive.

== Iran ==
The Islamic Republic of Iran Railways (RAI) purchased 80 GT26CW-2s along with 182 GT26CWs . All GT26CW locomotives were manufactured by General Motors Diesel Division of Chicago, Illinois, 20 GT26CW-2s were constructed by General Motors Diesel Division of London, Ontario and the remaining were built by Hyundai, a Korean licensee of General Motors Diesel Division. Out of 262 GT26CW locomotives, 180 units are currently in revenue service. All RAI locomotives have three 48-inch fans instead of 2 which is a necessary provision for hot climate of Iran.

== Israel ==
As of 2017, Israel Railways operates fourteen locomotives. It purchased one GT26CW-2 unit from EMD in 1989 for the purpose of hauling coal imported through the Port of Ashdod to the Rutenberg Power Station in Ashkelon until a dedicated coal pier was completed at the Rutenberg site in 2000. Since then the locomotive, numbered 701, has been used for general freight service on Israel Railways' network.

In the mid-2010s Israel Railways purchased thirteen units from NRE which were completely rebuilt by TŽV Gredelj from 11 Croatian Railways HŽ series 2062 GT26 units plus 2 new frames and designated as NGT26CW-3 variants. They were delivered to Israel Railways between August 2015 and December 2017 and numbered 710–722.

== Morocco ==
In Morocco, the GT26CW-2 is variously given the designations DH-350, DH-370, and DK 550, depending on its usage.

== Peru ==
The Empresa Nacional de Ferrocarriles del Peru (ENAFER) operated 7 GT26CW-2 in the Peruvian southern railway and six JT26CW-2B, the latter being a unique variant of the GT26CW-2 equipped with double cabin, on the section that would later become the Andean Central Railway, which were produced by Brazilian corporation Villares (now known as GEVISA). After ENAFER was privatized, the GT26s and JT26s were inherited by the recently created PeruRail and Ferrocarril Central Andino (FCCA) respectively. All of 7 PeruRail's GT26's were still operating as of 2023, but out of the 6 FCCA's JT26's, only one remains operative as of 2024, with 3 being inoperative, one scrapped after a fatal derailment following a runaway incident, with an additional one that was almost destroyed in a terrorist attack in 1989 being sent to Argentina for major overhauls and finally being bought by Ferronor. This unit was still operative as of 2022.

== South Korea ==
From December 1989 to October 2000, the Korean National Railroad received GT26CW-2s from Electro-Motive Division and Hyundai Rolling Stock Co. (present:Hyundai Rotem) The locomotives are used for freight service, Mugunghwa passenger trains, Saemaul passenger trains, and excursion trains (G-Train, S-Train, and the Haerang). on all Korail lines, though some are currently owned by the Korea Rail Network Authority.

Very little is known about their construction. However, it is known that 83 units were constructed between December 1989 and October 1996 as the 7300-series, units 7301–7383, were constructed between December 1996 and May 1998 as 7400-series units 7401-7414 and 7500-series units 7557–7583, and 70 units were constructed between November 1998 and October 2000 as 7400-series units 7415–7484.

== Turkey ==
The Turkish State Railways received 89 units built by Tülomsaş between 2003 and 2009. The units are numbered TCDD DE33000. They have the latest innovations of the GT26 series, mainly noticed by a spacier cab view.

== Yugoslavia ==
The Yugoslav Railways (Jugoslavenske Željeznice) received 14 GM GT26CW-2s from EMD, where they formed the 663 series. Mainly used for freight and passenger trains between Knin and Split (Dalmatinska pruga, today part of M604 railway (Croatia)). All locomotives went to service on Hrvatske Željeznice after the breakup of Yugoslavia in 1991. They are now classified as HŽ series 2063. In the meanwhile, some were sold to NRE which then completely rebuilt and refurbished them in Croatia before selling some of them to Israel Railways.

== Gallery ==
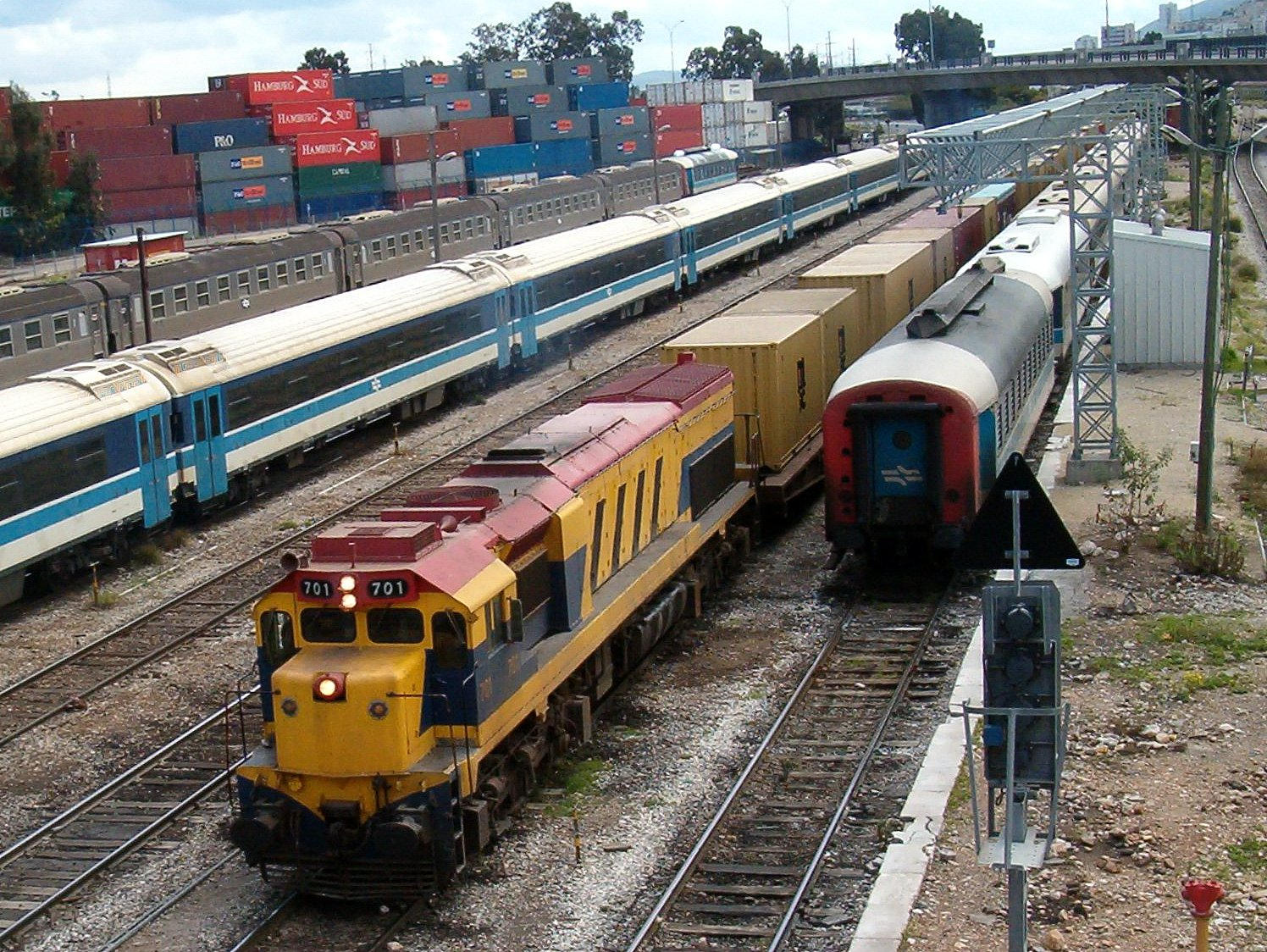
Israel Railways GT26CW-2

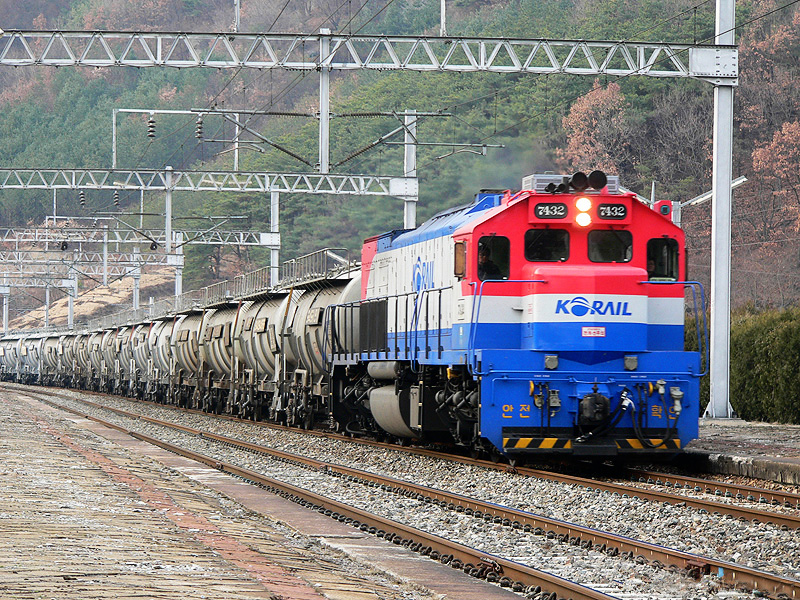
Korail 7432

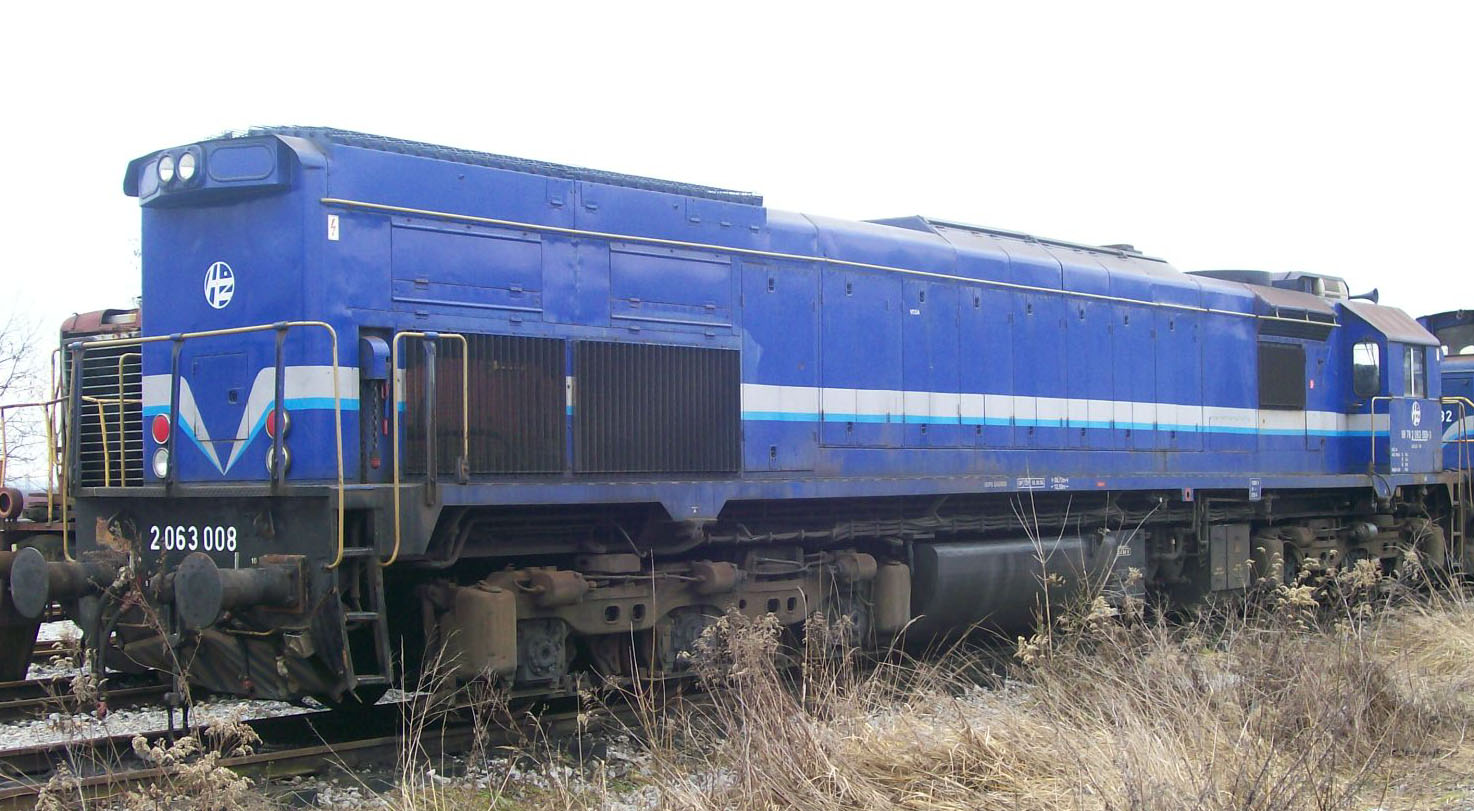
Croatian 2063 series locomotive

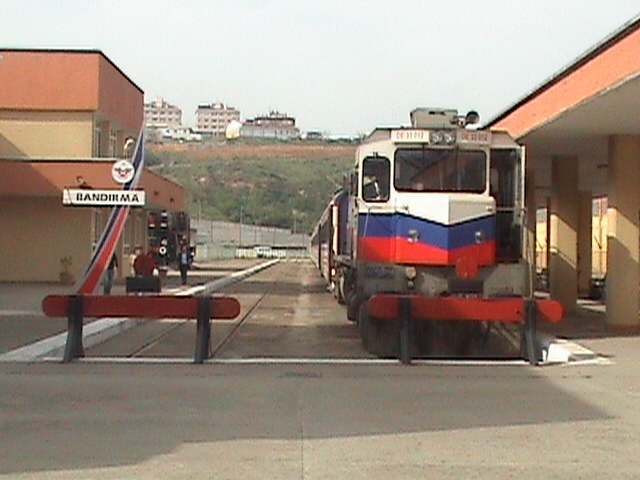
TCDD DE 33000 at Bandırma Station.

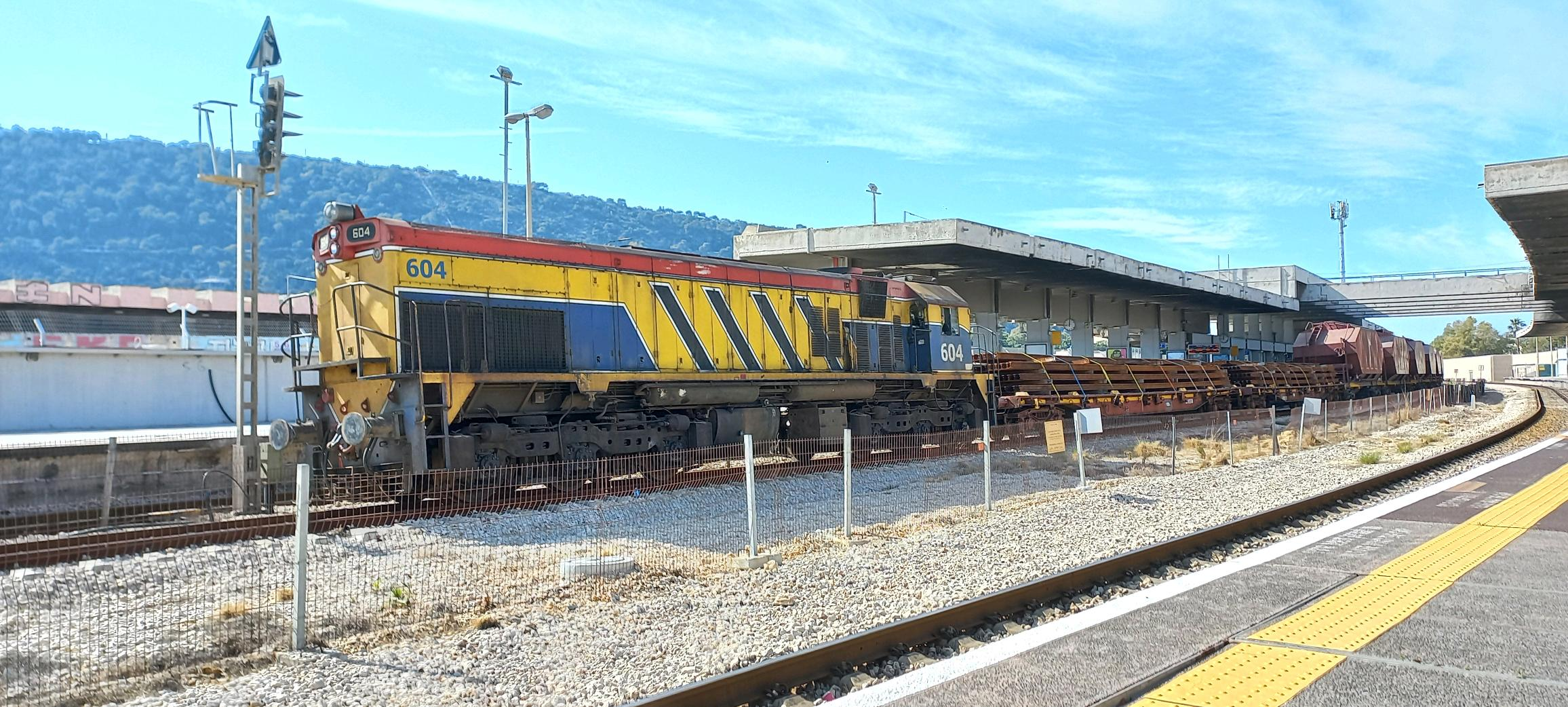
Israel Railways EMD GT26CW-2 at Haifa Bat Galim railway station

== See also ==
- EMD SD40-2, a similar locomotive for the North American loading gauge
- List of GM-EMD locomotives
- List of GMD Locomotives

== Sources ==
- 2063 at zeljeznice.net (in Croatian)
- GT26CW at trainweb.org
- TCDD DE 33000 at tulomsas.com.tr
- TCDD DE 33000 at tulomsas.com.tr (in Turkish)
