= TCDD DE24000 =

Class of Turkish diesel locomotives

DE 24000
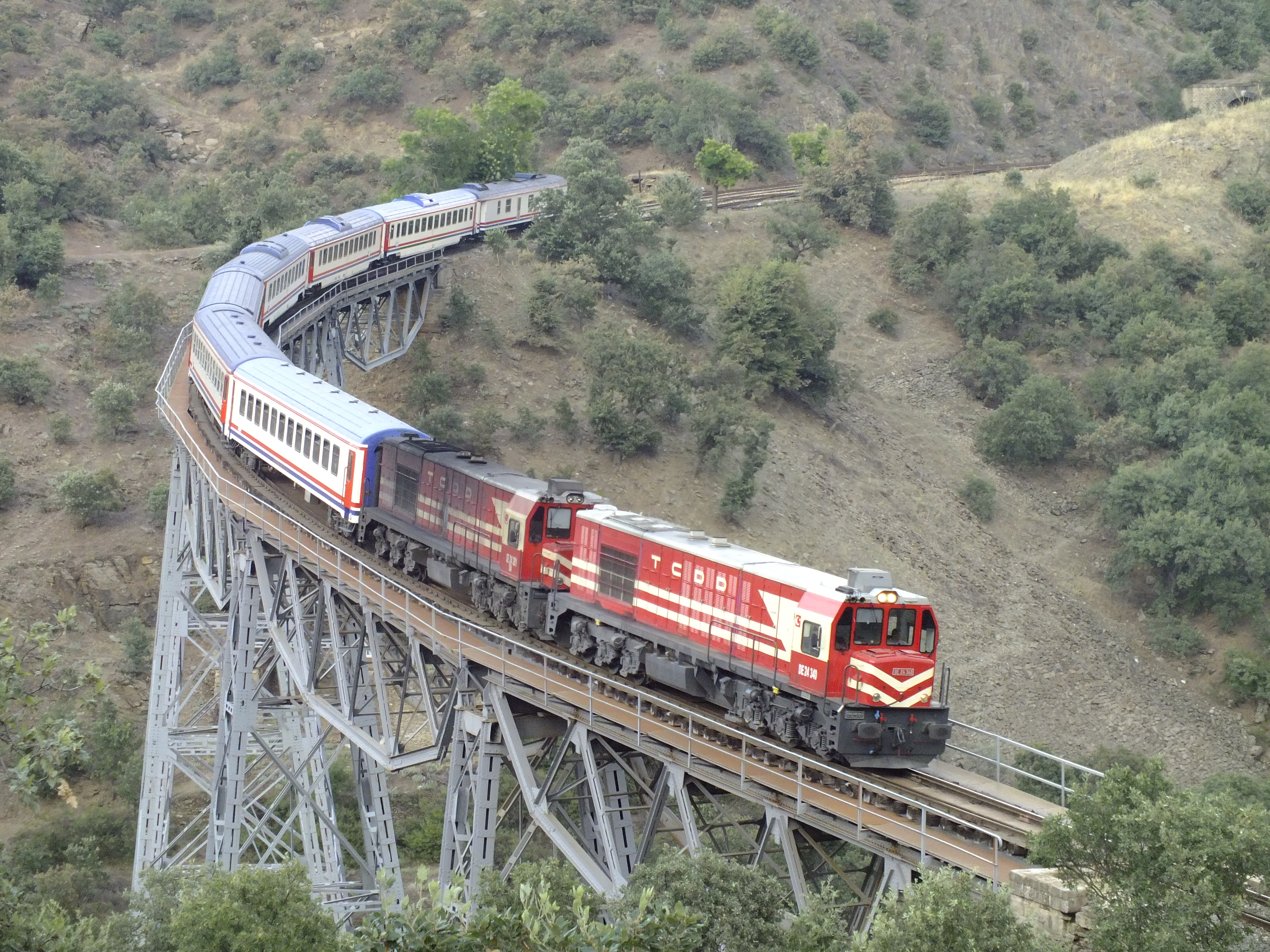
- Two DE24000 locomotives pulling a westbound regional train.
Type and origin
- Power type: Diesel-electric
- Designer: Matériel de Traction Electrique, modified vastly
- Builder: Matériel de Traction Electrique (first units); Tülomsaş (all remaining)
- Model: 1970
- Build date: 1970–1984
- Total produced: 430
Specifications
- Configuration
  - AAR: C-C
  - UIC: Co'Co'
- Gauge: 1,435 mm (4 ft 8 1/2 in)
- Bogies: 2
- Wheel diameter: 1,100 mm (43 in)
- Length: 22.67 metres (74.4 ft)
- Loco weight: 113 tonnes (111 long tons; 125 short tons)
- Fuel capacity: 4,960 litres (1,090 imp gal; 1,310 US gal)
- Prime mover: Pielstick 16PA4V185(most units) (Note: Replaced by clones manufactured by TÜLOMSAŞ(TLM 16V185) as they go under maintenance.); Hedemora Diesel V16(some units)
- RPM range: 679-1599
  - RPM low idle: 620
  - RPM idle: 650
  - Maximum RPM: 1680
- Engine type: Diesel V16
- Aspiration: Turbocharged
- Alternator: 72V
- Generator: 600VAC
- Traction motors: DC traction motors
  - Rating 1 hour: 1200 (automatically governed)
  - Continuous: 1200 (automatically governed)
- Cylinders: V16
- Transmission: AC-DC
- Gear ratio: 16/87 at traction motors
- MU working: yes (with identical units) since 2017 revisions
- Loco brake: Air brake
- Train brakes: Air brake
- Safety systems: emergency brake, gas-generator notching decoupler, dead man's switch
Performance figures
- Maximum speed: 120 km/h (75 mph) (designation); 144 km/h (89 mph) (overspeed with blue and accelerated trains-this practice prohibited)
- Power output
  - Starting: 1,760.0 kW (2,360.2 hp) (original rating with Pielstick engines); 1,610.0 kW (2,159.0 hp) (re-rating and all units with Hedemora engines); 1,250 kW (1,680 hp) (certain derated engines with raised idle speed)
  - 1 hour: no restriction
  - Continuous: 2,200.0 hp (1,640.5 kW) (road use); 1,860.0 hp (1,387.0 kW) (switching duties)
- Tractive effort
  - Starting: 394 kilonewtons (89,000 lb_{f})
  - Continuous: 357 kilonewtons (80,000 lb_{f}) @ 16 kilometres per hour (9.9 mph)
Career
- Operators: TCDD Taşımacılık
- Numbers: DE24001 – DE24430
- Nicknames: "Mavi lokomotif" (blue locomotive-ones with blue livery); Yirmidörtbinlik (24000ths)
- Locale: Turkey

TCDD DE 24000 (stylised as DE 24 000 in painted registration numbers) is a type of diesel locomotive built for operations on Turkish State Railways (TCDD) by Tülomsaş. 430 units were built between 1970 and 1984 under license from Matériel de Traction Electrique (MTE) of France. The DE 24000 formed the backbone of the dieselisation of the Turkish railways during the 1970s. It follows the hood unit road switcher design, like most Turkish mainline locomotives. DE 24 000 is the most commonly found locomotive class in Turkey.

In addition to MTE, diesel parts were supplied by Chantiers de l'Atlantique, electric parts from Jeumont-Schneider, and mechanical parts from Forges et Ateliers du Creusot, all of which later acquired by Alstom.

== History ==
During the 1970s the Turkish State Railways decided to replace their 800 steam locomotives with diesel. This quite-delayed task required the delivery of more than 400 diesel units. On February 15, 1968, TCDD and MTE signed an agreement for delivery of the DE 24000 along with the delivery of the smaller DE18000. To build up domestic competence on diesel engines, TCDD decided that the production would be done by Tülomsaş of Turkey. Only Tülomsaş-built units are still operational.

=== Blue trains (Mavi tren) and DE 24000 ===
Blue trains are express passenger trains with 120 km/h (75 mph) timetable speed. They originally started replacing black trains (Turkish: kara tren), which are trains pulled by black steam locomotives with tenders. All cars of the blue trains had blue livery and were pulled by blue DE24000s. They are now pulled by TCDD E68000s and have regular livery but still retain their long-distance national passenger rail network status.

=== Overspeeding provision ===
These locomotives had been used over their power and speed ratings until 2004. Delayed trains were "force-fit" into the timetable by overspeeding up to 10% over timetable speeds. This required both overspeeding the prime mover and modifying the traction motors' final drive ratios. This practice was banned after the Pamukova train derailment.

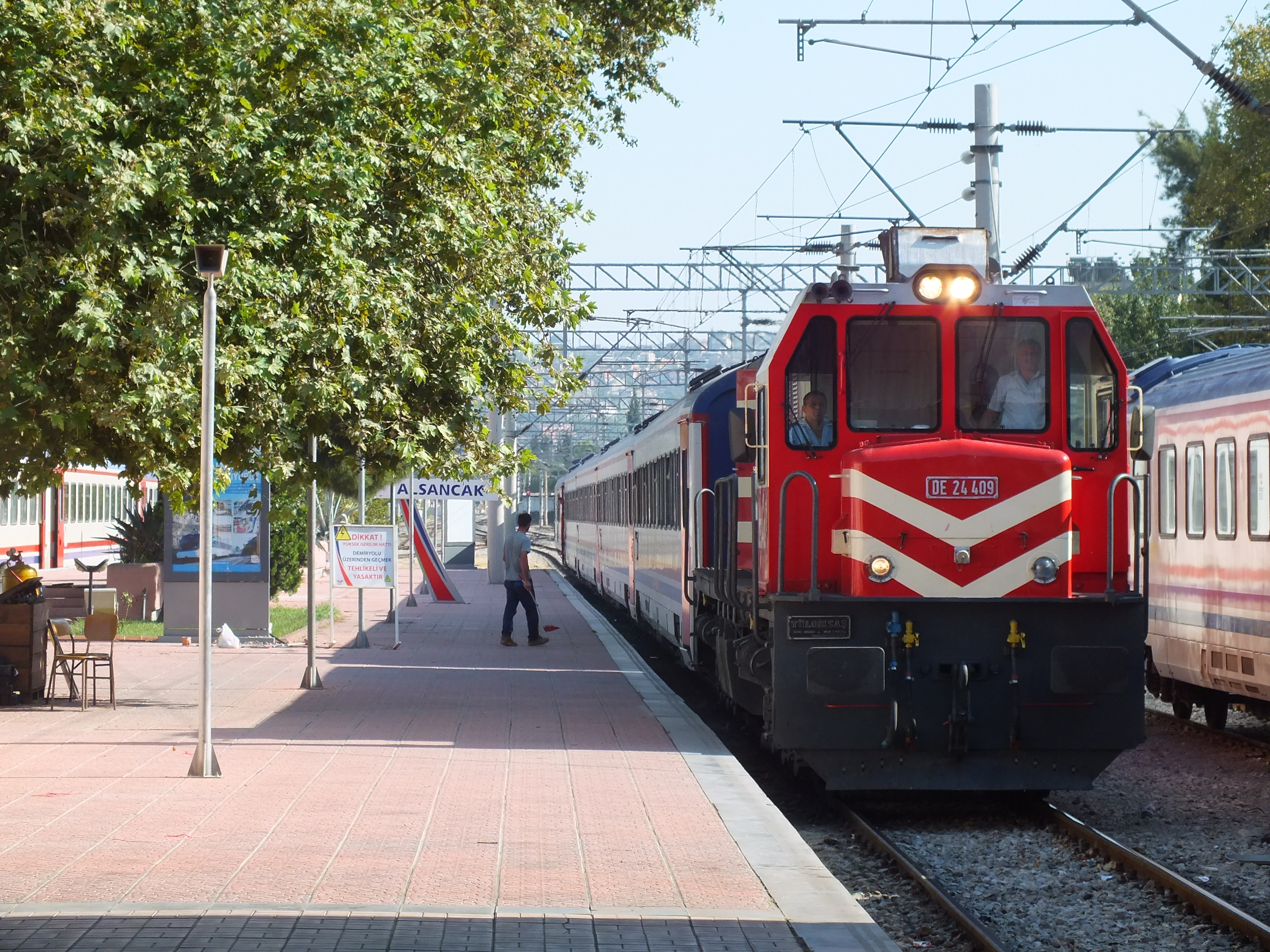
DE 24409 at Alsancak.
