= TCDD E1000 =

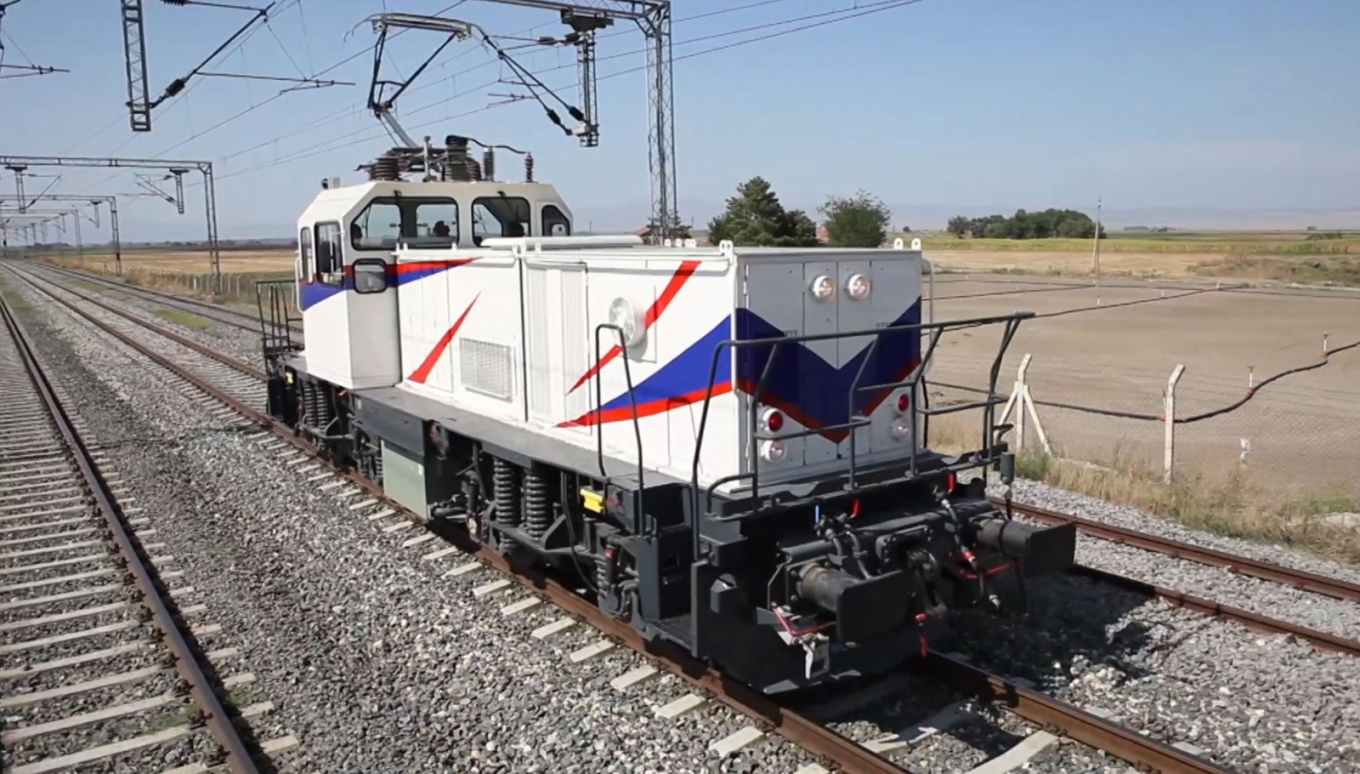
Type and origin
- Power type: Electric
- Builder: TÜLOMSAŞ; TÜBİTAK MAM
- Build date: 2015
- Total produced: 1
Specifications
- Configuration
  - AAR: B-B
  - UIC: Bo'Bo'
  - Commonwealth: Bo-Bo
- Gauge: 1,435 mm (4 ft 8 1/2 in)
- Length: 13,250 mm (43 ft 6 in)
- Axle load: 18 t (18 long tons; 20 short tons)
- Loco weight: 72 t (71 long tons; 79 short tons)
- Electric system/s: 25 kV 50 Hz AC
- Current pickup: Pantograph
- Loco brake: Knorr
Performance figures
- Maximum speed: 80 km/h (50 mph)
- Power output: 1,000 kW (1,300 hp)
- Tractive effort
  - Starting: 230 kN (52,000 lbf)
Career
- Operators: Turkish State Railways

The TCDD E1000 is an electric locomotive in use with Тurkish State Railways. A single prototype was built in 2015 by TÜLOMSAŞ and TÜBİTAK MAM. The main feature of the locomotive is its regenerative braking system, allowing it to make a halt in the shortest possible time without external assistance. It also uses induction motors for its traction system.

The locomotive have a power rating of 1000 kW, and can reach speeds up to 80 km/h. The locomotive weighed 72 tons, and measured at 13,250 mm in length.

== Background ==
The DE11000 diesel shunters, which were in need of modernisation since the mid-1990s, were plagued by the increasing difficulty of supplying spare parts abroad. For this reason, in 2008, TULOMSAS began development of an electric shunting locomotive that could replace the DE110000. The Ministry of Transportation, Maritime and Communication projected that Turkey would be manufacturing fully indigenously-made locomotives by 2023.

== Trials ==
During testing, the E1000 prototype conducted a series of successful deceleration and slip prevention system tests in stop-starts, and managed to reach 65 km/h while hauling a 1,000 ton train on a level piece of track. In November 2015, the locomotive passed tests in regenerative braking on a 2.8% grade in Bilecik with a 520 ton train.
