= 18000 =

18000 may refer to:

== Railway vehicles ==
- British Rail 18000 - a prototype gas turbine-electric locomotive built for British Railways in 1949
- Tokyo Metro 18000 series - an electric multiple unit train type
- TCDD DE18000 - a type of diesel-electric locomotive built for Turkish State Railways

== Other ==
- ISO/IEC 18000 - an international standard that describes RFID technologies
- 18,000 BCE - a year in pre-history
- 18,000 - a number
- 18000 - a minor planet
- Unit 18000 - Division of the Quds Force
