= Raykent LDH70 =

Diesel-hydraulic locomotive

LDH 70
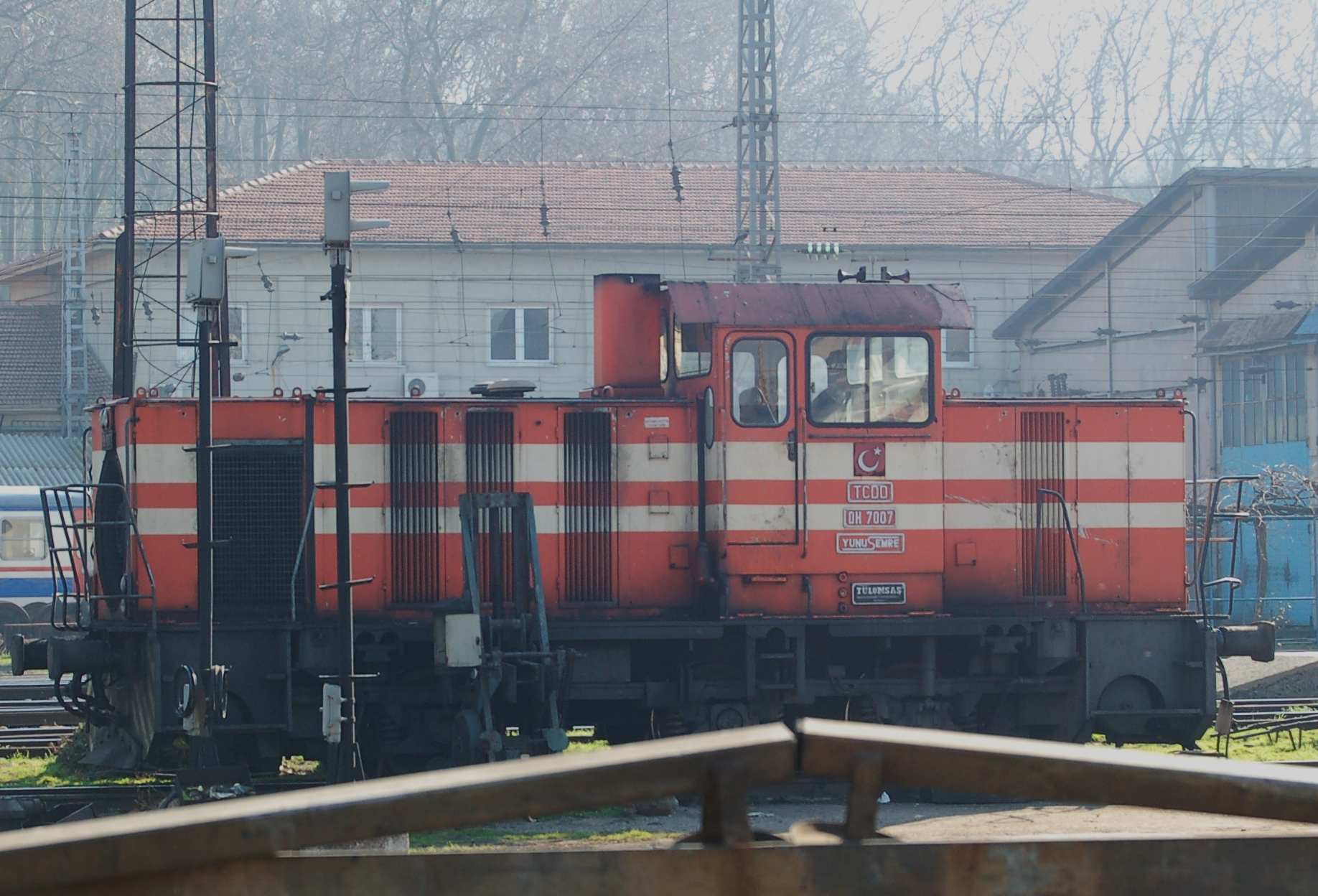
- DH7007 at Sirkeci yard, Istanbul.
Type and origin
- Power type: Diesel-hydraulic
- Builder: Tülomsaş (repaired by Raykent Lojistik)
- Build date: 1994, 2016 (rebuild)
- Total produced: 5
Specifications
- Configuration
  - UIC: B'B'
- Gauge: 1,435 mm (4 ft 8 1/2 in)
- Bogies: 2
- Wheel diameter: 1,000 mm (3 ft 3 in)
- Length: 11,460 mm (37 ft 7.2 in)
- Width: 3,000 mm (9 ft 10.1 in)
- Height: 4,550 mm (14 ft 11.1 in)
- Loco weight: 47 tonnes (46 long tons; 52 short tons)
- Fuel capacity: 1,600 litres (350 imp gal; 420 US gal)
- Prime mover: 4-stroke diesel
- RPM
  - RPM low idle: 600 (V-engine units); 1000 (inline engine units)
  - Maximum RPM: 1500 (V-engine units); 2100 (inline engine units)
- Engine type: Cummins (type varies by units)
- Aspiration: Natural aspiration
- Cylinders: Inline 6 or V8
- Transmission: Voith L4
- Loco brake: Block break, Parking pawl
- Train brakes: Air
- Safety systems: Dead man's switch, Hijack protection
Performance figures
- Maximum speed: 70 km/h (43 mph)
- Power output: varies by unit
Career
- Operators: Raykent Lojistik
- Numbers: LDH70-001 – LDH70-004

LDH70 are a type of diesel-hydraulic locomotive adapted from the TCDD DH7000. LDH 70 units are primarily used in shunting and slow moving freight operations.
