= Bogi =

Bogi may refer to:

- Bogi Fabian (born 1984), Hungarian artist Boglárka Réka Fábián
- Bogi Løkin (born 1998), Faroese footballer
- Bogi Thorarensen Melsteð (1860–1929), Icelandic historian
- Bogi Þorsteinsson (1918–1998), first chairman of the Icelandic Basketball Association
- Bogi (singer) (born 1997), Hungarian singer Boglárka Dallos-Nyers
- Nickname of Sarah Lateiner, American auto mechanic and reality television personality
- Giorgio Bogi (born 1929), Italian surgeon and politician
- Bogi Ágústsson, a journalist in Iceland.

== See also ==
- Bogie (disambiguation)
- Bhogi, the first day of an Indian harvest festival
