= TCDD DE11000 =

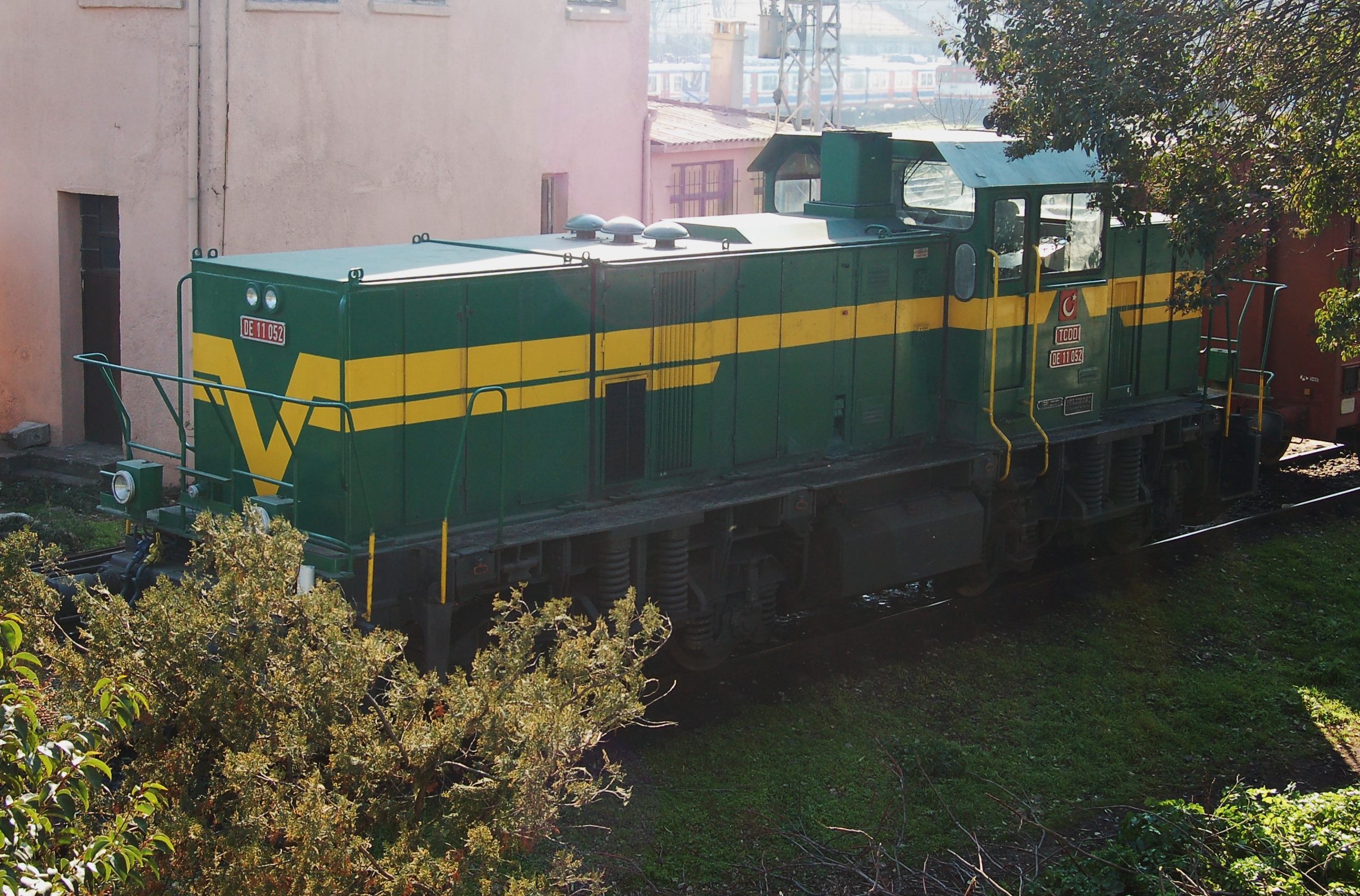
- TCDD DE11052 at Sirkeci, Istanbul
Type and origin
- Power type: Diesel-electric
- Builder: Krauss-Maffei, Germany (20), Tülomsaş (70)
- Build date: 1985, 1986–1990
- Total produced: 85
Specifications
- Configuration
  - AAR: B-B
  - UIC: Bo'Bo'
- Gauge: 1,435 mm (4 ft 8 1/2 in)
- Bogies: 2
- Length: 13.25 m (43 ft 6 in)
- Loco weight: 68 tonnes (67 long tons; 75 short tons)
- Prime mover: MTU 8V 396
- Engine type: Diesel
- Aspiration: Turbocharged
- Cylinders: V8
- Transmission: AC-DC; AC-DC-AC
- Loco brake: Air, Parking pawl
- Train brakes: Air
- Safety systems: Dead man's switch
Performance figures
- Maximum speed: 80 km/h (50 mph)
- Power output: 785 kW (1,053 hp)
- Tractive effort: 225 kN (51,000 lbf)
Career
- Operators: Turkish State Railways; TCDD Taşımacılık
- Numbers: DE11001 – DE11085
- Locale: İzmir, Malatya, Adana

TCDD DE11000 is a series of diesel-electric locomotives used by the Turkish State Railways. The batch consisted of 85 units delivered from 1985. The first 20 locomotives were built by Krauss-Maffei, the remaining 70 on licence by Tülomsaş. There are two series of the locomotive, the first 15 having direct current motors, the latter 70 having alternating current motors. The units have Bo'Bo' wheel arrangement and are powered by 720 kW engines (depending on model) Most of these are scrapped, some of these were converted to diesel-hydraulic traction, remaining ones are working in yard duties. It is possible to switch between either control stand of the cab even while moving.
