= TÜDEMSAŞ =

Rolling stock manufacturer

- Type: Public
- Industry: Rail transport
- Founded: 1939 (as Sivas Cer Atelyesi)
- Fate: Merged into TÜRASAŞ
- Successor: TÜRASAŞ
- Headquarters: Sivas, Turkey
- Area served: Turkey
- Key people: Halil Torun (Chairman)
- Products: Rail cars
- Total assets: 80,000,000 YTL (2009)
- Number of employees: 1,500 (2009)
- Website: TÜDEMSAŞ

Türkiye Demiryolu Makinaları Sanayi A.Ş. or TÜDEMSAŞ was a rail car builder headquartered in Sivas, Turkey. The company was a government owned corporation founded in 1939. TÜDEMSAŞ is the main supplier of freight cars for the Turkish State Railways. The Y32 bogi was designed by TÜDEMSAŞ.
