= TCDD DE36000 =

DE36000
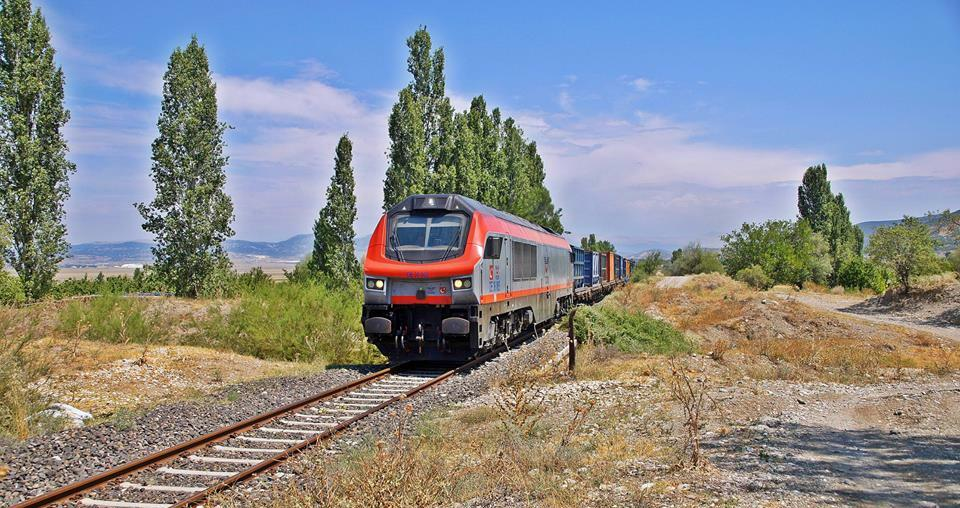
Type and origin
- Power type: Diesel-electric
- Designer: General Electric
- Builder: TÜLOMSAŞ
- Model: GE PowerHaul
- Build date: 2014
- Total produced: 20
Specifications
- Configuration
  - AAR: C-C
  - UIC: Co'Co'
- Gauge: 1,435 mm (4 ft 8 1/2 in)
- Loco weight: 130 tonnes (130 long tons; 140 short tons)
- Fuel type: Diesel Oil with Common Rail Direct Injection
- Fuel capacity: 8,700 L (1,914 imp gal; 2,298 US gal)
- Prime mover: GE P616 V16
- Engine type: Four stroke turbodiesel
- Cylinders: 16
Performance figures
- Maximum speed: 120 km/h (75 mph)
- Power output: 2,750 kW (3,690 hp)
Career
- Operators: Turkish State Railways
- Numbers: DE36001 – DE36020
- Nicknames: Otuz altı binlikler(36000ths)

TCDD DE36000 is a class of diesel-electric locomotives built by TÜLOMSAŞ under license from GE PowerHaul for the Turkish State Railways (TCDD). The locomotives are equipped with a V16 four-stroke turbo-diesel engine featuring common rail fuel injection.
