= TCDD DH7000 =

Diesel-hydraulic locomotive class

DH 7000
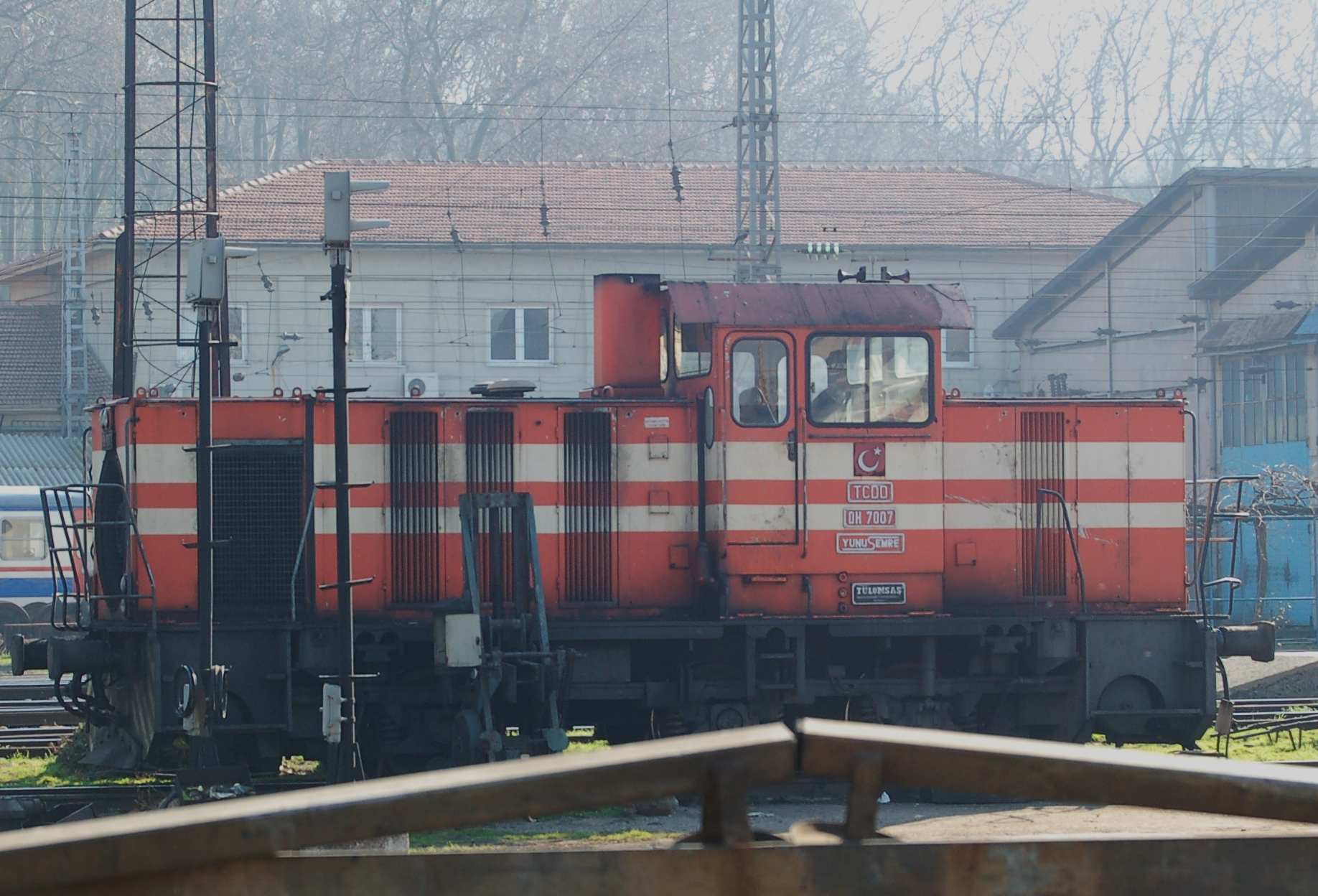
- DH7007 at Sirkeci yard, Istanbul.
Type and origin
- Power type: Diesel-hydraulic
- Builder: Tülomsaş
- Build date: 1994
- Total produced: 20
Specifications
- Configuration
  - UIC: C
- Gauge: 1,435 mm (4 ft 8 1/2 in)
- Bogies: 1
- Wheel diameter: 1,000 mm (3 ft 3 in)
- Length: 10,184 mm (33 ft 4.9 in)
- Width: 3,000 mm (9 ft 10.1 in)
- Height: 4,195 mm (13 ft 9.2 in)
- Loco weight: 51 tonnes (50 long tons; 56 short tons)
- Fuel capacity: 1,800 litres (400 imp gal; 480 US gal)
- Engine type: Cummins KTTA 19L1
- Transmission: Voith L4
- Loco brake: Block break, Parking pawl
- Train brakes: Air
- Safety systems: Dead man's switch
Performance figures
- Maximum speed: 40 km/h (25 mph)
- Power output: 522 kW (700 hp)
Career
- Operators: Turkish State Railways
- Numbers: DH7001 – DH7020

TCDD DH 7000 are a type of diesel-hydraulic locomotive built for operations on Turkish State Railways by Tülomsaş. The DH7000 was primarily used as a shunter. A total of 20 units were delivered from 1994.
