= Bogi Fabian =

- Born: Boglárka Réka Fábián; 1984 (age 41–42)
- Known for: Fluorescent murals

Boglárka Réka Fábián, better known professionally as Bogi Fabian, is a Hungarian artist most known for her fluorescent and glow-in-the dark murals and prints. Her works also include installation art, body painting, "traditional" painting, ceramics and visual design in general.

== Life and work ==
Fabian was born in Hungary in 1984. She has been perfecting her artistic skills since early childhood. In her mid teens she moved abroad, sharing residencies between Austria and Italy in the following years.

Other than classical painting techniques, she ventured into photography, graphics and 3D design and researched topics such as observation of natural phenomena and social relationships. Her work is often based on primary questions of human existence with her visual themes regularly focusing on space and universe-depictions. Her art pieces were awarded at several contests and competitions in different countries and many of them were featured in newspapers, magazines, galleries and exhibitions.

== Murals and Glow-in-the-Dark Technique ==
In her mid-twenties Fabian started experimenting with mural designs and fluorescent and glow-in-the-dark colours, blending her two main interests, that created her most well-known art pieces. By applying complex painting techniques and a wide range of colors and pigments, she creates a starry atmosphere, visually opening up confined spaces, usually applying a three-dimensional effect in the daylight as well as in the dark or under UV light.

== Other interests ==
In addition to unique wall and body painting, she is currently pursuing ceramic designs and exploring an in-depth approach to questions of consciousness and existence.
