= TCDD E68000 =

Series of Turkish electric locomotives

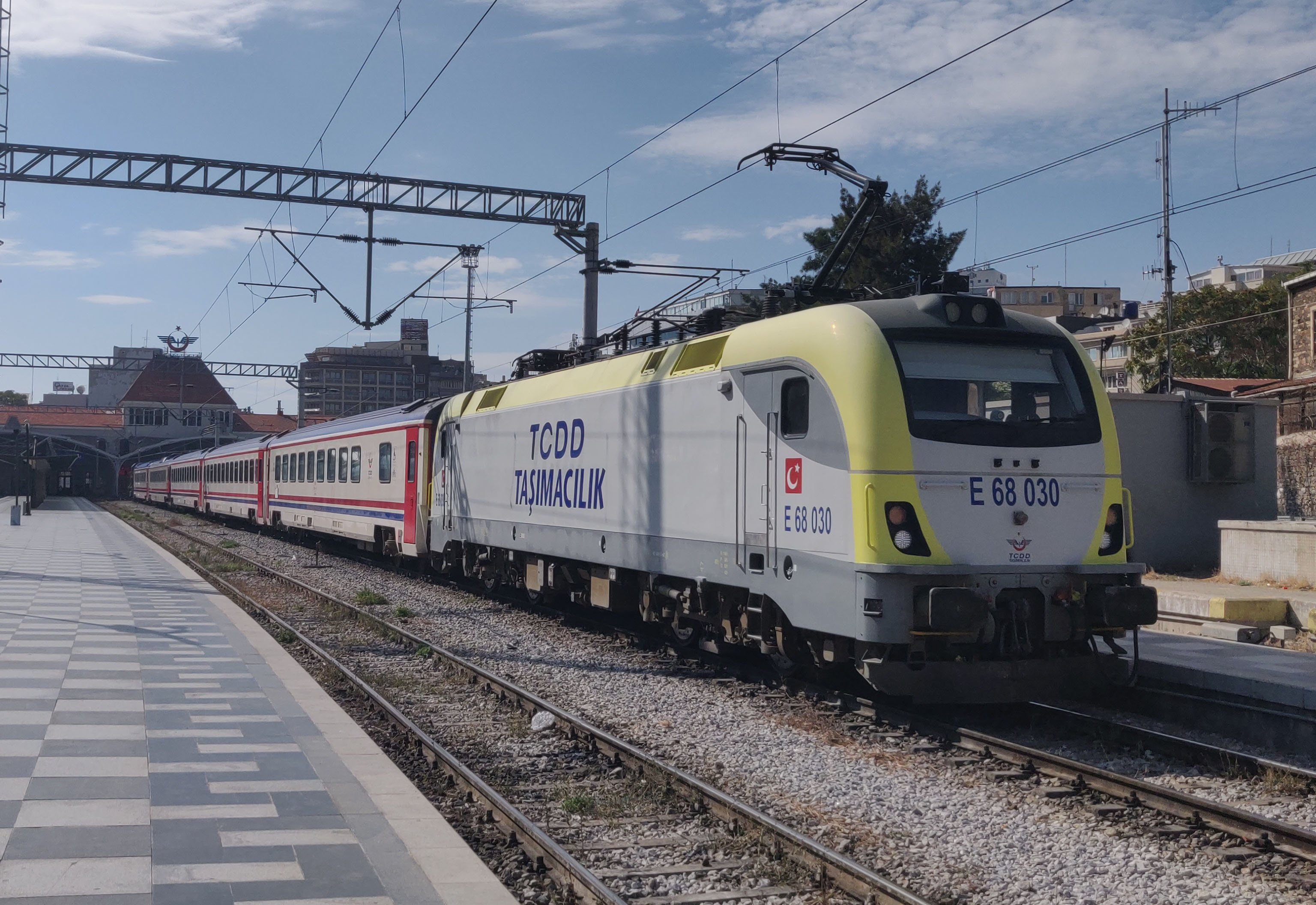
- TCDDT E68030 at Basmane station.
Type and origin
- Power type: Electric
- Designer: Hyundai Rotem
- Builder: Hyundai Rotem, TÜLOMSAŞ
- Build date: 2013–2015
- Total produced: 80
Specifications
- Configuration
  - AAR: B-B
  - UIC: Bo'Bo'
- Gauge: 1,435 mm (4 ft 8 1/2 in)
- Length: 20 m (65 ft 7 in)
- Loco weight: 86 tonnes (85 long tons; 95 short tons)
- Electric system/s: 25 kV 50 Hz AC Catenary
- Current pickups: Pantograph, 1,600 millimetres (63 in) wide single-pole collector
Performance figures
- Maximum speed: 140 km/h (90 mph) (Note: In practice, all 25 kV/50 Hz overhead lines in Turkey are overvolted to 27500 V, enabling 175 km/h (109 mph).)
- Power output: 5 MW (6,705 hp)
Career
- Operators: TCDD Taşımacılık
- Numbers: E68001 – E68080

TCDD E68000 (stylised as E 68 000 on painted registration numbers) is a series of electric locomotives used by the Turkish State Railways. The locomotives have a power output of 5,000 kW and are capable of 140 km/h (87 mph) speed.

== History ==
The first 8 locomotives were built by Hyundai Rotem in South Korea and the later 72 by TÜLOMSAŞ in Eskişehir, Turkey.

The order has a total cost of $330 million, with 220 million being provided by Islamic Development Bank. These locomotives have a quite simple and unusual livery for TCDD with two flashy yellow stripes on a gray background. The livery of the E68009 is also a bit different from the rest of the series with a big TCDD's corporate logo standing alone on each side. Revised locos have yellow TCDD lettering replaced by blue TCDD Taşımacılık lettering.

== Accidents and incidents ==
Locomotive 68 041 was involved in the Ankara train collision on 13 December 2018.

== Notes ==
Traction motors are AC asynchronous traction motors. Power comes to traction motors from converter-inverter blocks.
