= TCDD DE18000 =

Class of Turkish diesel-electric locomotives

DE18000
Type and origin
- Power type: Diesel-electric
- Builder: Material de Traction Electrique
- Model: Special order
- Build date: 1970
- Total produced: 5
Specifications
- Configuration
  - AAR: B-B
  - UIC: Bo'Bo'
- Gauge: 1,435 mm (4 ft 8 1/2 in)
- Wheel diameter: 1,110 mm (44 in)
- Length: 16.44 m (53 ft 11 in)
- Width: 2.7 m (8 ft 10 in)
- Height: 4.153 m (13 ft 8 in)
- Loco weight: 80 tonnes (79 long tons; 88 short tons)
- Fuel capacity: 3,800 litres (840 imp gal; 1,000 US gal)
- Engine type: Pielstick 12PA4 V185 VG
- Cylinders: 12
Performance figures
- Maximum speed: 120 km/h (75 mph)
- Power output: 1,320 kW (1,770 hp)
- Tractive effort: 263 kN (59,000 lbf)
Career
- Operators: Turkish State Railways
- Numbers: DE18001 – DE18005
- Locale: İzmir

TCDD DE18000 are a type of diesel-electric locomotive built for operations on Turkish State Railways by Matériel de Traction Electrique. The order was a trial for a lighter version of the DE24000, and only five units were delivered. The units were mostly used around İzmir and are now retired with the exception of DE18003 which as of January 2024 was still active in the İzmir area.

== History ==
During the 1970s the Turkish State Railways decided to replace their 800 steam locomotives with diesel. This quite delayed task required the delivery of more than 400 diesel units. On February 15, 1968, TCDD and MTE signed an agreement for delivery of the DE24000 and the DE18000. TCDD opted for the larger Co'Co' engine, and only five were delivered of the smaller Bo'Bo'.
