= TÜLOMSAŞ =

Rolling stock manufacturer

- Type: Anonim şirket
- Industry: Rail transport
- Predecessor: 2
- Founded: 1894; 132 years ago in Eskişehir, Turkey
- Defunct: May 4, 2020
- Fate: Merged into TÜRASAŞ
- Successor: TÜRASAŞ
- Headquarters: Eskişehir, Turkey
- Area served: Turkey
- Services: Locomotive and Wagon construction
- Revenue: ₺ 150,000,000
- Number of employees: 1500
- Website: TÜLOMSAŞ

TÜLOMSAŞ (Turkish: Türkiye Lokomotif ve Motor Sanayi Anonim Şirketi) was a locomotive and wagon builder in Turkey. It was the main locomotive supplier of the Turkish State Railways and was one of the two companies that designed and assembled locomotives in Turkey along with EUROTEM. The company headquarters and factory was located in Eskişehir.

The company built GE PowerHaul locomotives under a partnership with GE Transportation.

On May 4, 2020 it merged with TÜVASAŞ and TÜDEMSAŞ to form TÜRASAŞ

== See also ==
- Devrim

== Gallery ==
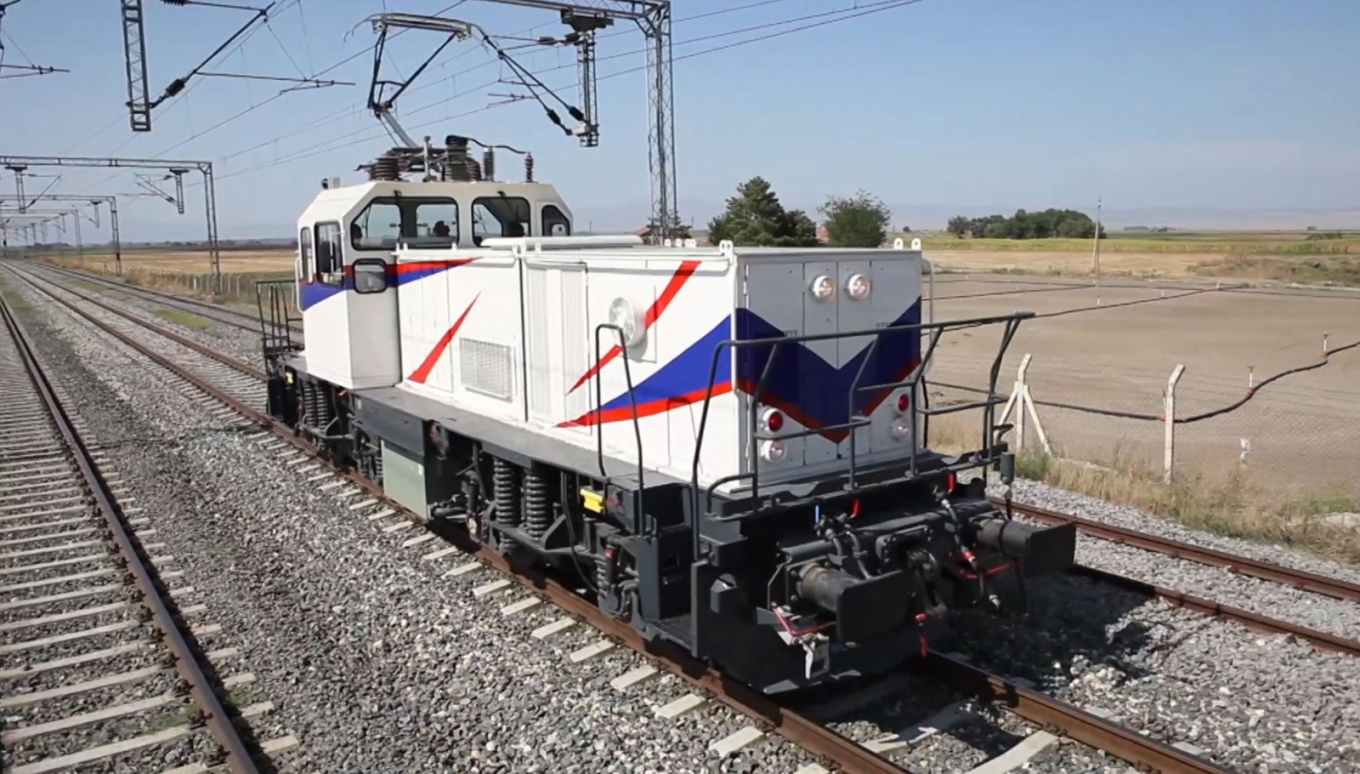
Electric locomotive E 1000 series

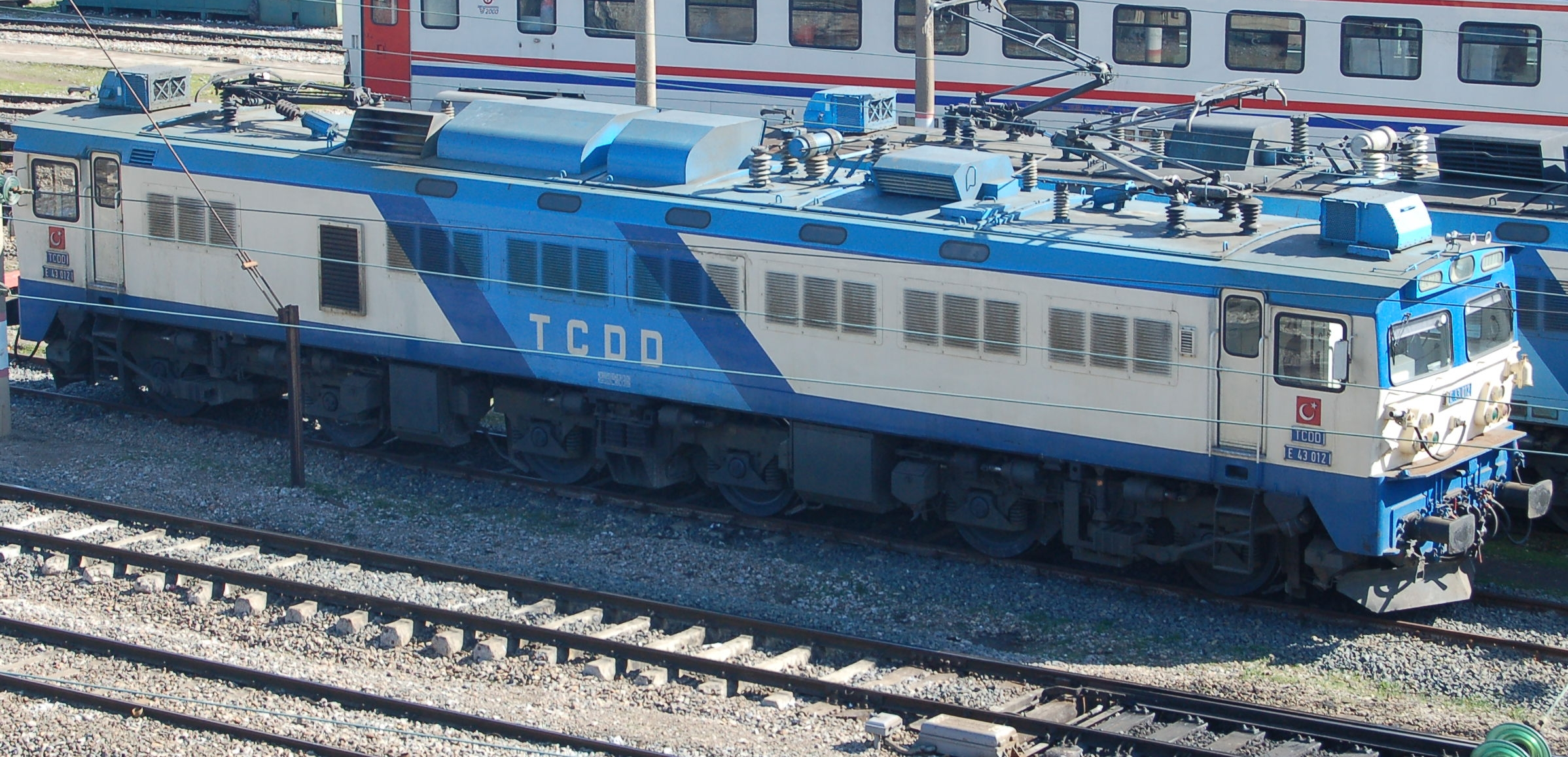
Electric locomotive E 43000 series

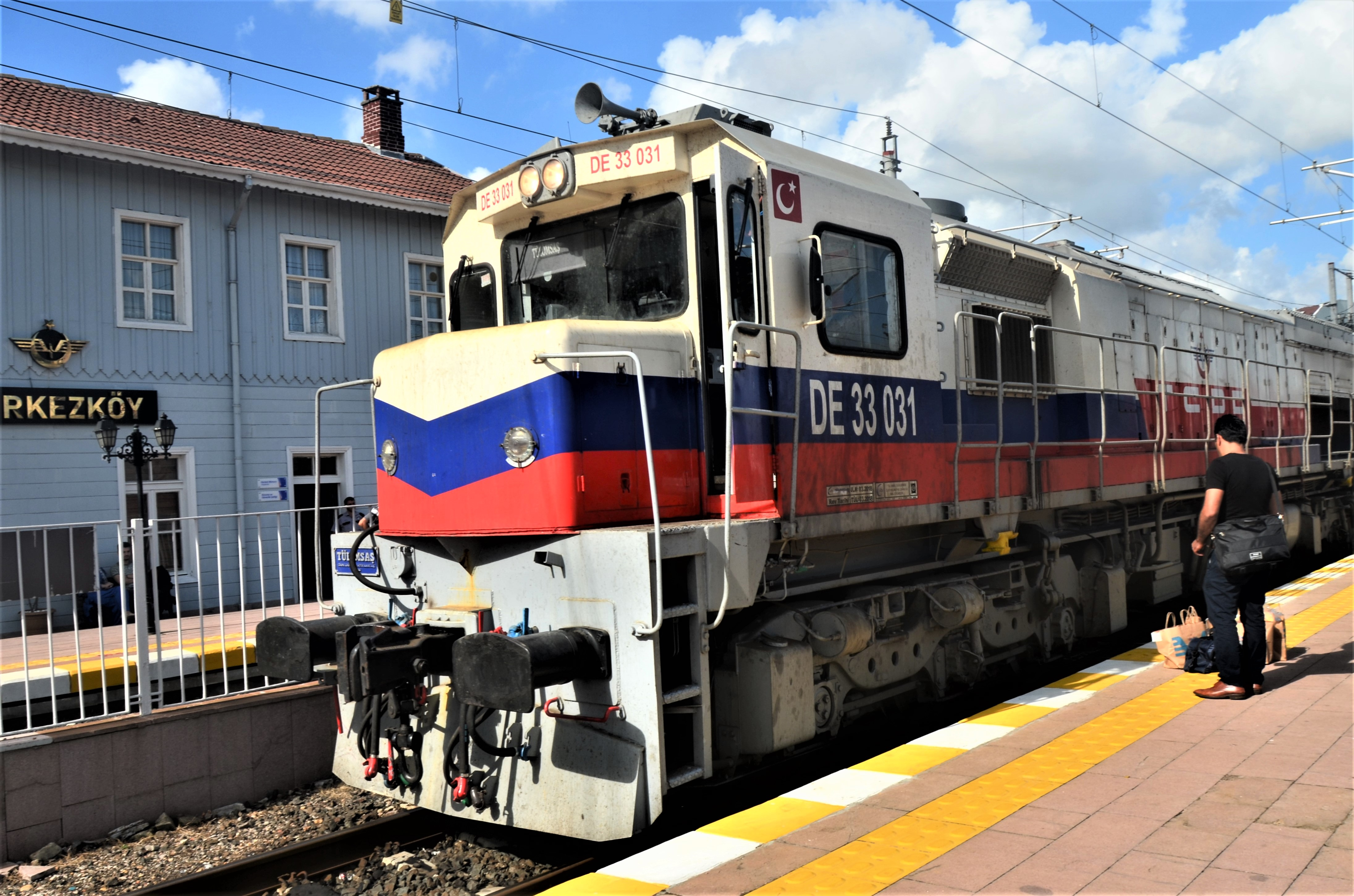
Electro-diesel locomotive DE 33000 series

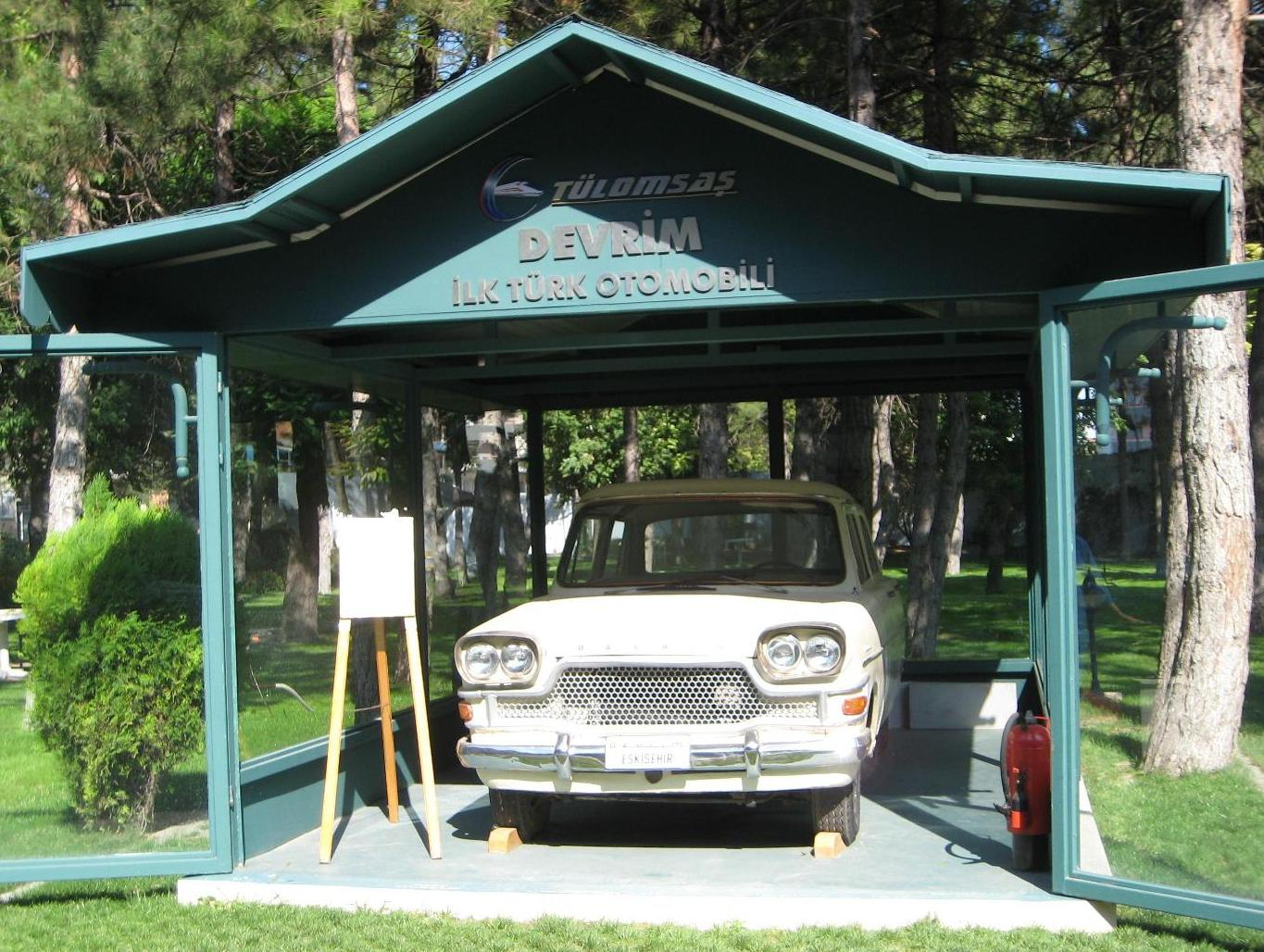
First Turkish built automobile Devrim
