= TCDD Transport =

Turkish national train operator

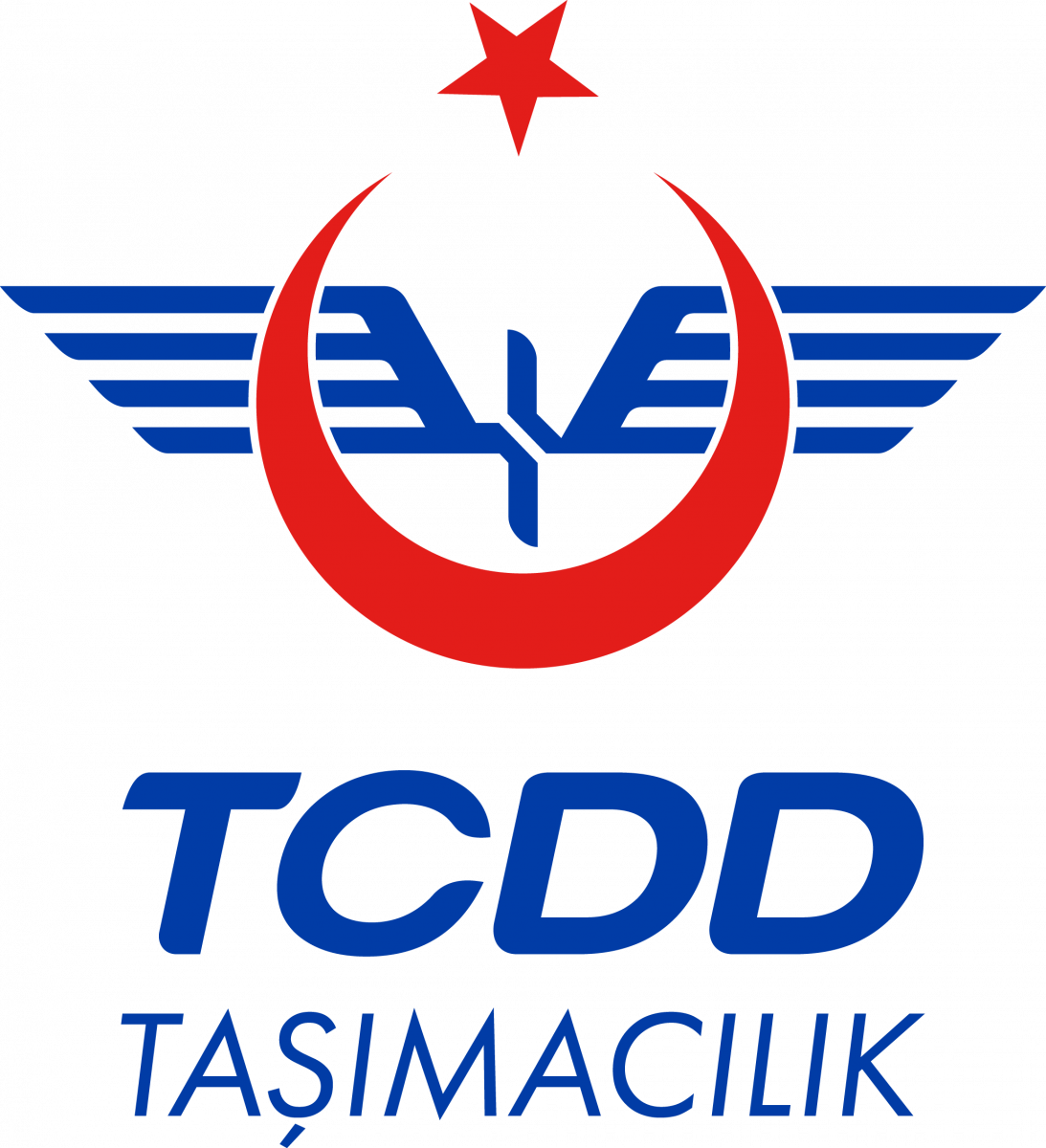
- Native name: TCDD Taşımacılık A.Ş.
- Type: Closed joint-stock company
- Industry: Railway transport, Logistics
- Predecessor: Turkish State Railways
- Founded: 14 June 2016
- Headquarters: Ankara, Turkey
- Area served: Turkey
- Key people: Ufuk Yalçın (Chairman); Çetin Altun (Vice Chairman and Board Member); Fikret Şinasi Kazancıoğlu (Vice Chairman)
- Products: Rail transport, Cargo transport, Services
- Owner: Ministry of Transport and Infrastructure (Turkey) (100%)
- Website: www.tcddtasimacilik.gov.tr

TCDD Transport or Turkish State Railways Transport (Turkish: TCDD Taşımacılık, reporting mark TCDDT) is a government-owned railway company responsible for the operations of most passenger and freight rail in Turkey. The company was formed on 14 June 2016, splitting off from Turkish State Railways (TCDD) to take over railway operations, while TCDD would continue to administer railway infrastructure. TCDD Taşımacılık officially began operations on 1 January 2017.

== Organisation ==
TCDD Taşımacılık is a government-owned company responsible for the operation of passenger and freight railways within Turkey, including logistical centers and train ferries using infrastructure owned and maintained by the Turkish State Railways.

In 2024 the EU said that "subsidies to the incumbent railway operator and the lack of financial independence of the transport operator from infrastructure manager TCDD remain major issues."

== Passenger operations ==
TCDD Taşımacılık operates passenger rail service on most of its network. TCDD Taşımacılık operates trains on a network of over 13,430 km (8,350 mi) within 59 of the 81 provinces in Turkey. TCDD Taşımacılık operates five types of passenger rail on its network:

- High-speed (Yüksek Hızlı Tren): TCDD Taşımacılık's premier rail service.
- Mainline (Anahat): Standard intercity passenger rail service, between major cities.
- Regional (Bölgesel): Regional rail service, connecting major cities to surrounding cities, towns and villages.
- Commuter (Banliyö): Commuter rail service within major cities.
- International (Uluslararası): International train service to Europe.

=== High-speed rail ===
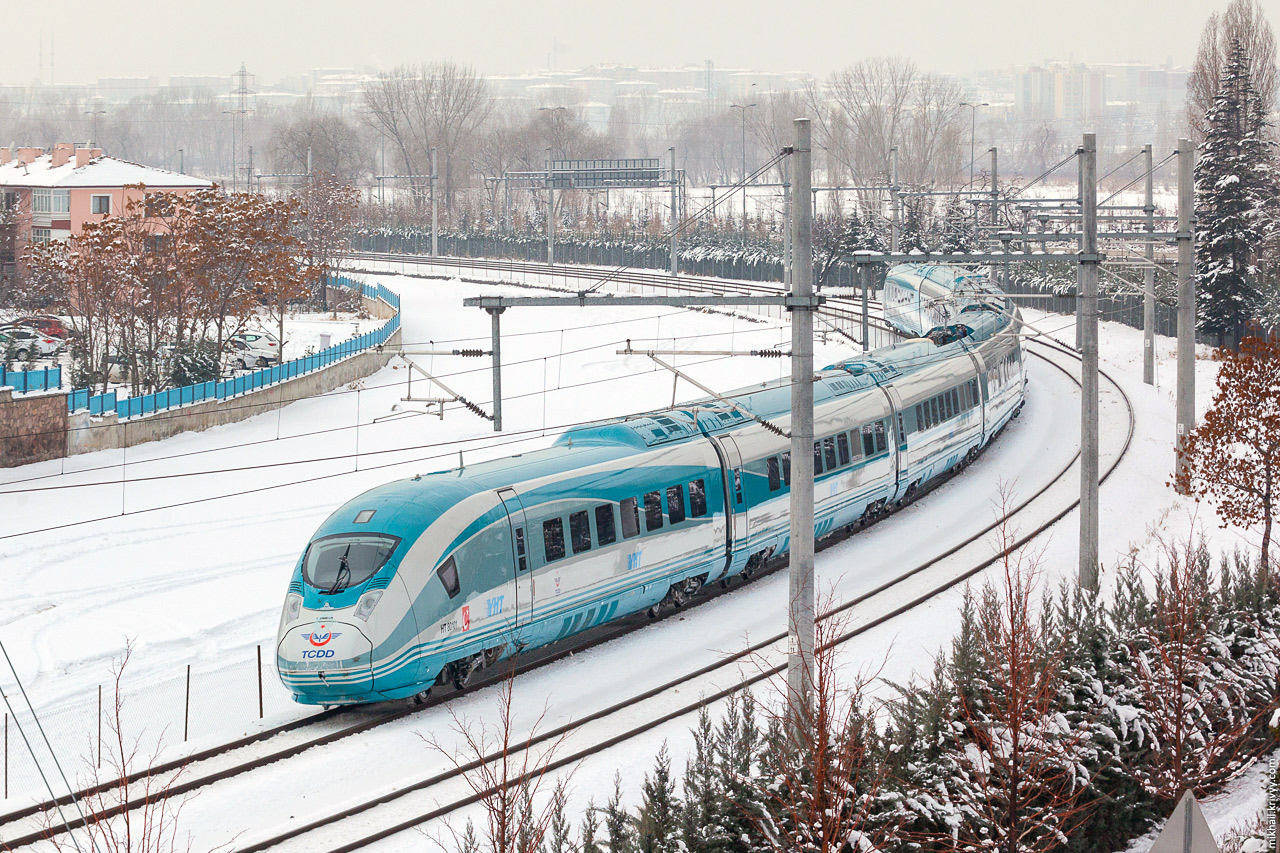
A high-speed Electric Multiple Unit in Ankara

High-speed rail service is TCDD Taşımacılık's premier trains service, currently operating eight routes between Istanbul, Ankara, Eskişehir, Sivas, Karaman and Konya along the Ankara-Istanbul, Ankara–Sivas, Konya-Karaman and Polatlı-Konya high-speed railways. High-speed trains are branded as Yüksek Hızlı Tren or YHT and operates at speeds of up to 250 km/h (160 mph). YHT train service is expected to expand further to Bursa and İzmir in 2027.

YHT trains use Ankara station as their main hub, with an exclusive concourse and lounges within the Ankara Tren Garı building, built over the southern platforms at Ankara station.

High-speed train service began on 13 March 2009, between Ankara and Eskişehir. In their final year before TCDD Taşımacılık took over, TCDD-operated YHT trains carried over 5.89 million passengers.

In January 2026 the announcement was made that the Turkish government had allocated over $6 billion for 91 rail projects, of which 54 would be implemented by TCDD.

=== Intercity rail ===
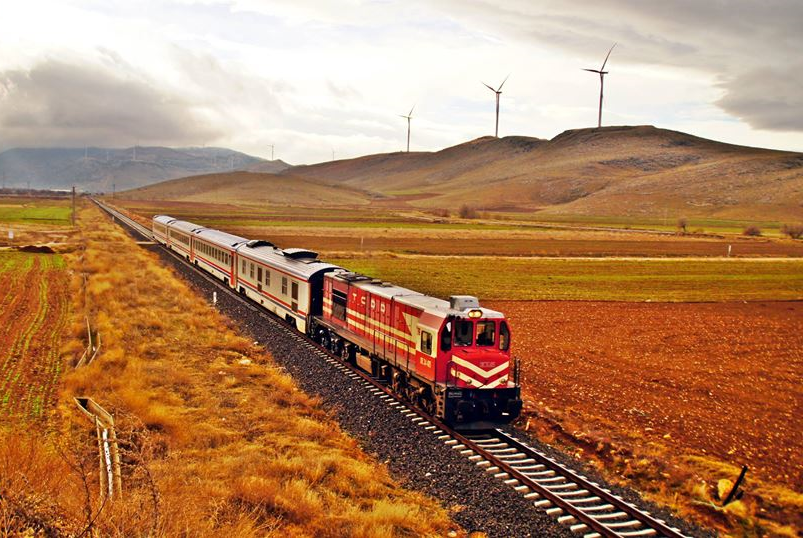
The Pamukkale Express running through rural Afyon Province.

Intercity rail in Turkey is known as Mainline (Turkish: Anahat) service. Mainline trains operate between major cities, often as overnight trains, and make limited stops. Mainline trains also operate at greater speeds than regional and commuter trains when the route permits it. Intercity trains were operated the most between Istanbul and Ankara and reached speeds of up to 140 km/h (87 mph) in certain sections. The Capital Express, Anatolian Express and the Republic Express were a few notable mainline trains that ran on the Istanbul to Ankara rail corridor. Once the Ankara-Istanbul high-speed railway was completed in 2014, all mainline train service between the two cities was replaced with high-speed rail service.

Mainline trains are usually equipped with TVS2000 air-conditioned cars, however refurbished Pullman cars are also used on some trains. Overnight mainline trains consist of sleeping and dining cars while some trains also have couchette cars in addition to sleepers.

During the final year before TCDD Taşımacılık took over operations, mainline trains carried over 1.3 million passengers.

=== Regional rail ===
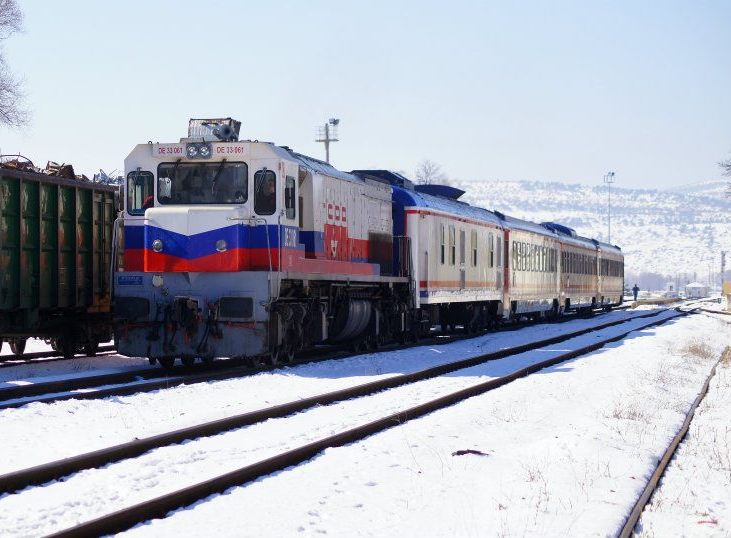
An Afyon-bound regional train from Eskişehir at Alayunt station.

Regional rail (Turkish: Bölgesel treni) service connects major cities to neighboring towns and villages, as well as other cities. These trains are usually the slowest in the whole TCDD Taşımacılık system, making frequent stops along its route. Some trains, like the Ada Express, however operate at faster speeds similar to mainline trains. All regional rail service operates within their respective districts, using one city as a hub.

The most frequent regional rail service in Turkey is between Adana and Mersin with 27 daily trains in each direction. The second most frequent route is between İzmir and Torbalı, with 18 daily trains in each direction.

Regional trains can be locomotive-hauled or consist of diesel or electric sets (MUs) or even diesel railcars. Locomotive-hauled trains consist of TVS200 or regular Pullman coaches. DM15000 and DM30000 DMUs are standard along many routes, especially south of İzmir. Regional trains lack any on-board services except at-cart catering services on most trains.

During the final year before TCDD Taşımacılık took over operations, regional trains carried over 13.5 million passengers.

=== Commuter rail ===
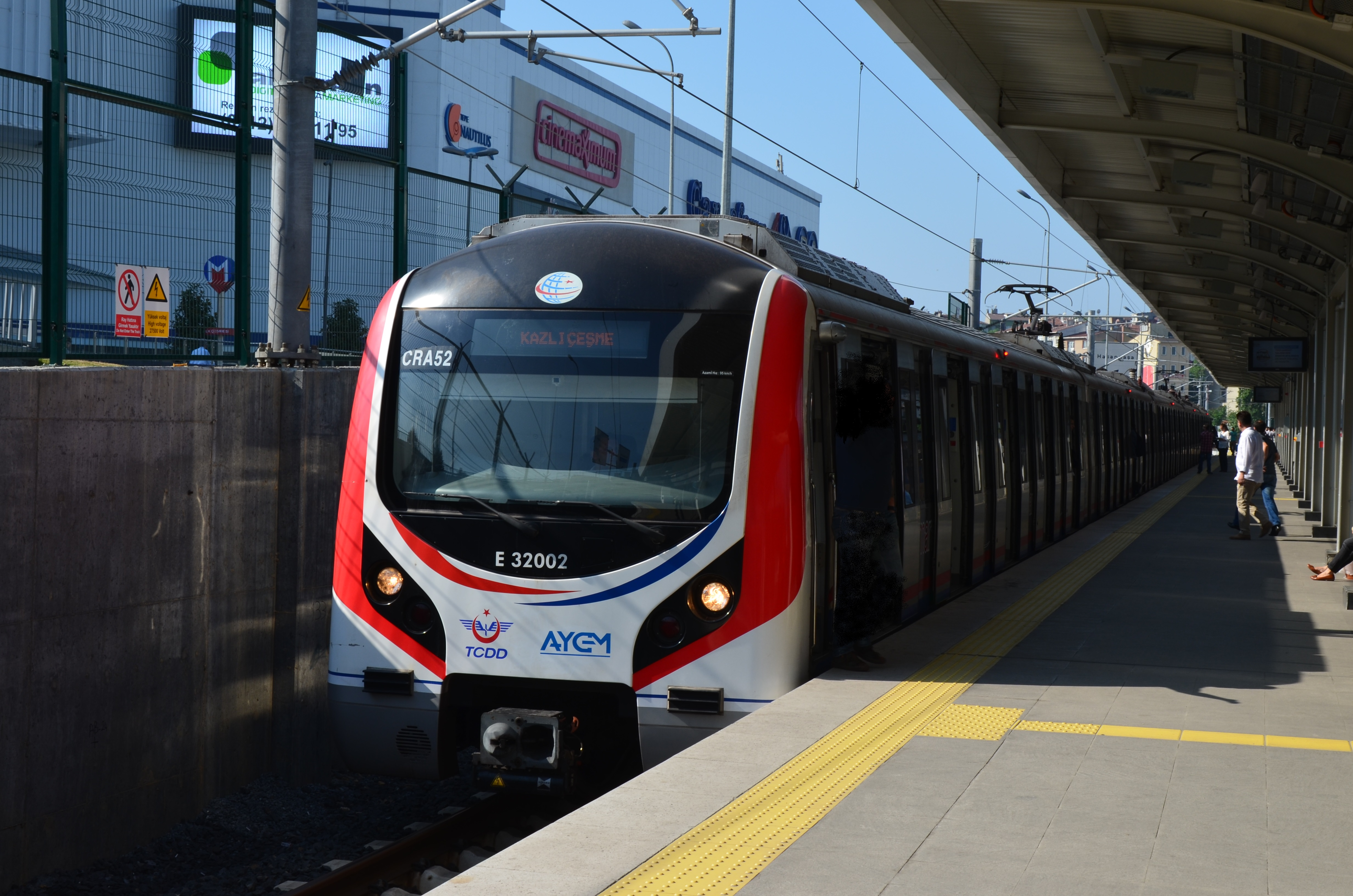
A Marmaray train at Ayrılık Çeşmesi station.

Commuter rail service is currently provided in Istanbul, Ankara and Gaziantep; with new networks under planning stage in Konya and Afyonkarahisar. The Marmaray network operates between Halkalı in Istanbul province and Gebze in the neighboring Kocaeli province. The tunnel that Marmaray uses to cross Bosphorus is the deepest immersed tube tunnel in the world, and the tunnel is also used by freight trains. Another commuter rail service operates between Halkalı and Bahçeşehir (both in Istanbul province), but due to the lack of a signalling system and double tracks, trains only operate once in the morning and once in the evening in each direction.

The Başkentray network in Ankara provides commuter rail service along an east-west axis between Sincan and Kayaş, with Ankara station as a hub.

All commuter rail service operates on its own right-of-way, similar to some S-Bahn systems in Germany, and are fully integrated with their respective cities' transportation network. The only commuter railway in Turkey not operated by TCDD Taşımacılık is İZBAN, which operates commuter rail on two lines in the İzmir metropolitan area.

=== International rail ===
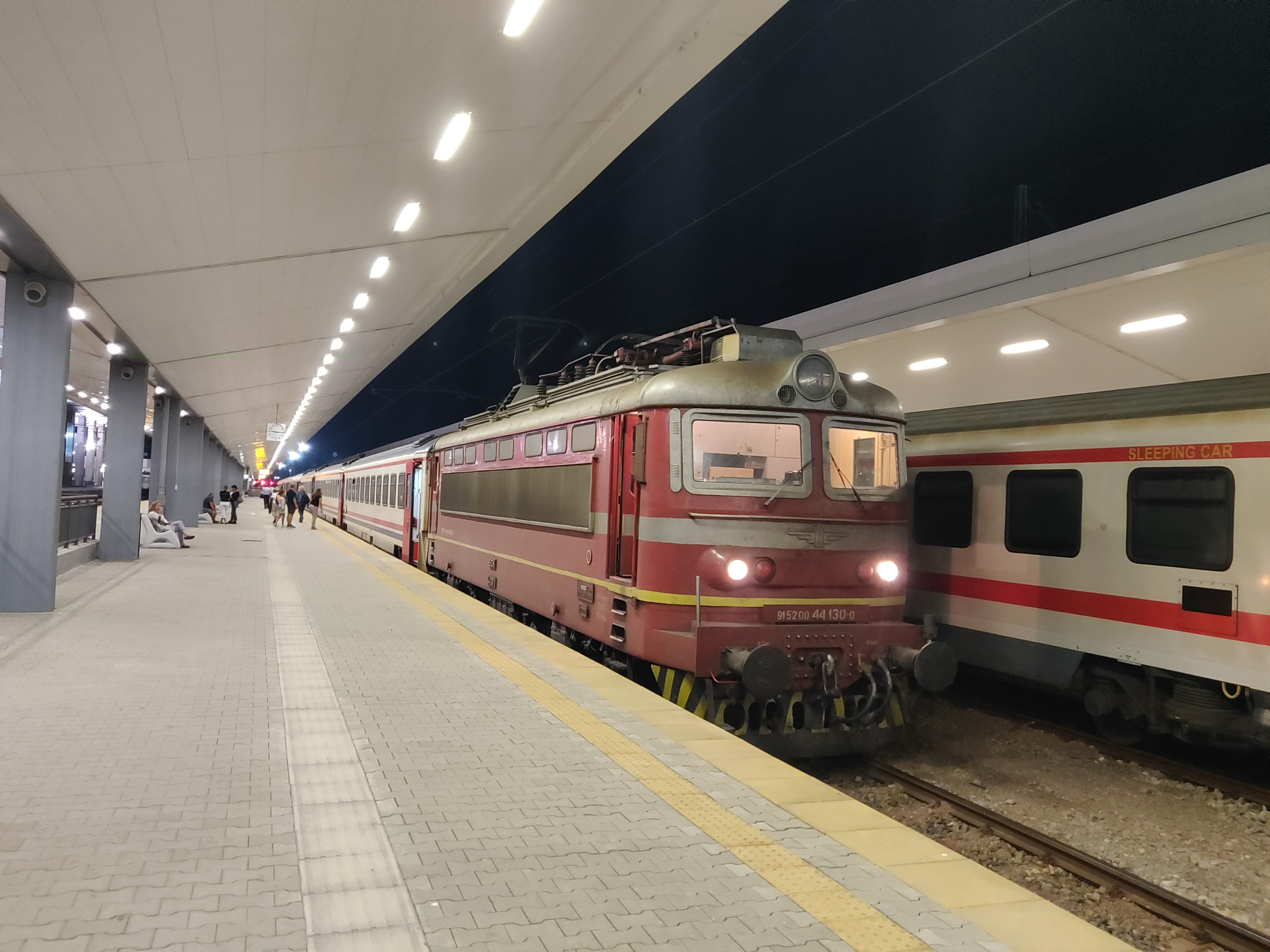
The Istanbul-Sofia Express waiting to depart Sofia.

While TCDD used to operate several international trains to Europe and the Middle East, most of these trains were cancelled due to the outbreak of war in Syria and Iraq, and the economic crisis in Greece. Currently, TCDD Taşımacılık operates two international trains from Istanbul to Sofia and Bucharest in Bulgaria and Romania respectively. These two routes operate out of Halkalı as a single train and later split in Bulgaria. Once the rehabilitation of the railway east of Halkalı is completed in late 2018, international train service will resume from their former terminus, Sirkeci station. An agreement between Greece and Turkey to revive the Istanbul to Thessaloniki train, cancelled in 2011, was signed in March 2016, but no progress has been made since and it is still unclear whether or not the train will resume service.

A new international passenger service from Kars to Baku, Azerbaijan, was expected to start June 2018 via the recently completed Baku–Tbilisi–Kars railway. A train such as this would be the first revenue passenger train service from Turkey to the Caucasus.

Due to the volatile situation in Syria and Iraq, all international train service to the Middle East is suspended indefinitely.

==== International services to Europe ====
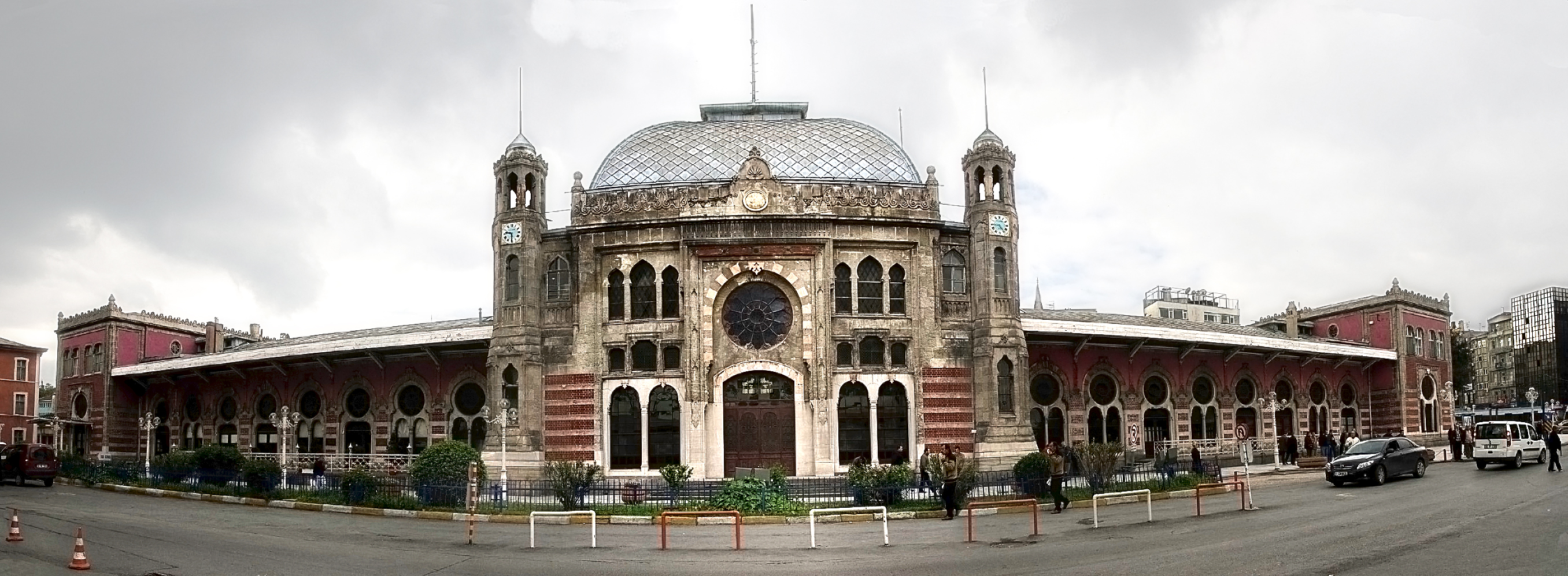
Sirkeci Terminal on the European side of Istanbul was inaugurated in 1890 as the terminus of the Rumelia Railway and the Orient Express.

- Istanbul-Sofia Express, to Sofia, Bulgaria via Edirne, Kapıkule railway station, Kapitan Andreevo, Plovdiv, Pazardzhik and Sofia.
- Bosphorus Express, to Bucharest, Romania via Edirne, Kapıkule railway station, Kapitan Andreevo, Dimitrovgrad, Ruse, and Bucharest.

== Freight operations ==
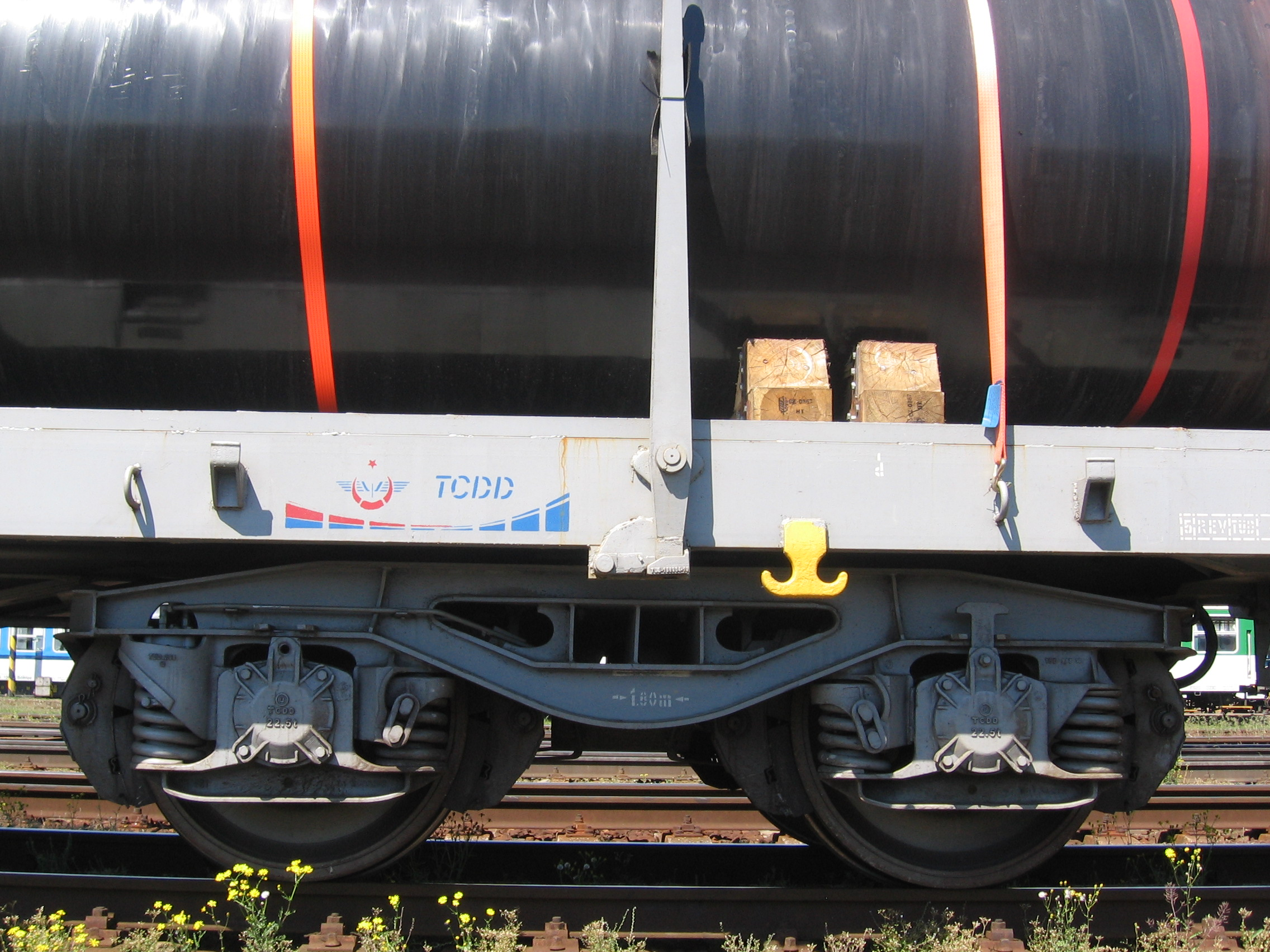
A freight wagon of the company

From 1980 onwards, rail freight tonne-kilometers transported by the TCDD rose slightly from ~5000million tonne-km in 1980 to ~7000million tonne-km in 1990 and to ~9000million tonne-km in 2000. Approximately 50% of freight moved is minerals or ores, with construction materials increasing to ~10% in 2000 from less than 5% in 1980, food/agricultural products, chemicals/petroleum, and metal sectors each account for between 5 and 10%. International freight accounted for approximately 5% of totals in 2000.

In 2012, 25.7 million tonnes were transported by rail in Turkey. Two steel companies, Erdemir and Kardemir, the top 2 customers of TCDD, had transported 4.5 million tonnes of freight in 2012, mainly iron ore and coal. 2.1 million tons of rail freight belong to international traffic. Most of the international traffic between Turkey and Europe is routed via Kapikule and mainly consists of container trains.

As of 2016, the number of goods transported by rail is stable (25.8 million tonnes) with 7.1 million tonnes being done with private wagons (domestic only). International transport is also stable since 2013 (1.8 million).

Containers are widely used both in international and domestic transportation. 7.6 million tons is carried in containers. TCDD supports transportation by containers. Thus, almost all of the private railway companies invested in container wagons, and carry 20% of all rail freight by their own wagons.

TCDD has plans to strengthen its freight traffic with the construction of 4,000 kilometres (2,500 mi) of conventional lines up to 2023. This includes new international rail connections to Georgia, Iraq and Iran, and will be complemented with the construction of 18 logistical centers in order to increase the ratio of domestic freight transported by rail. The company is also planning to increase its international transit traffic (as little as 7000 tonnes in 2016) by constructing an "iron silk road" that will connect Europe and Asia and thus take a share from one of the world's busiest freight traffic routes. The Marmaray and the Yavuz Sultan Selim bridge are the most important parts of this project which were completed in 2015 and 2016 respectively. Another key project is the Kars–Tbilisi–Baku railway which is planned to be completed in 2016 and start functioning in 2017. Also, plans for another supplying project to Kars-Tbilisi-Baku railway, the Kars-Igdir-Nakhcivan railway has been completed.

=== In Turkey ===
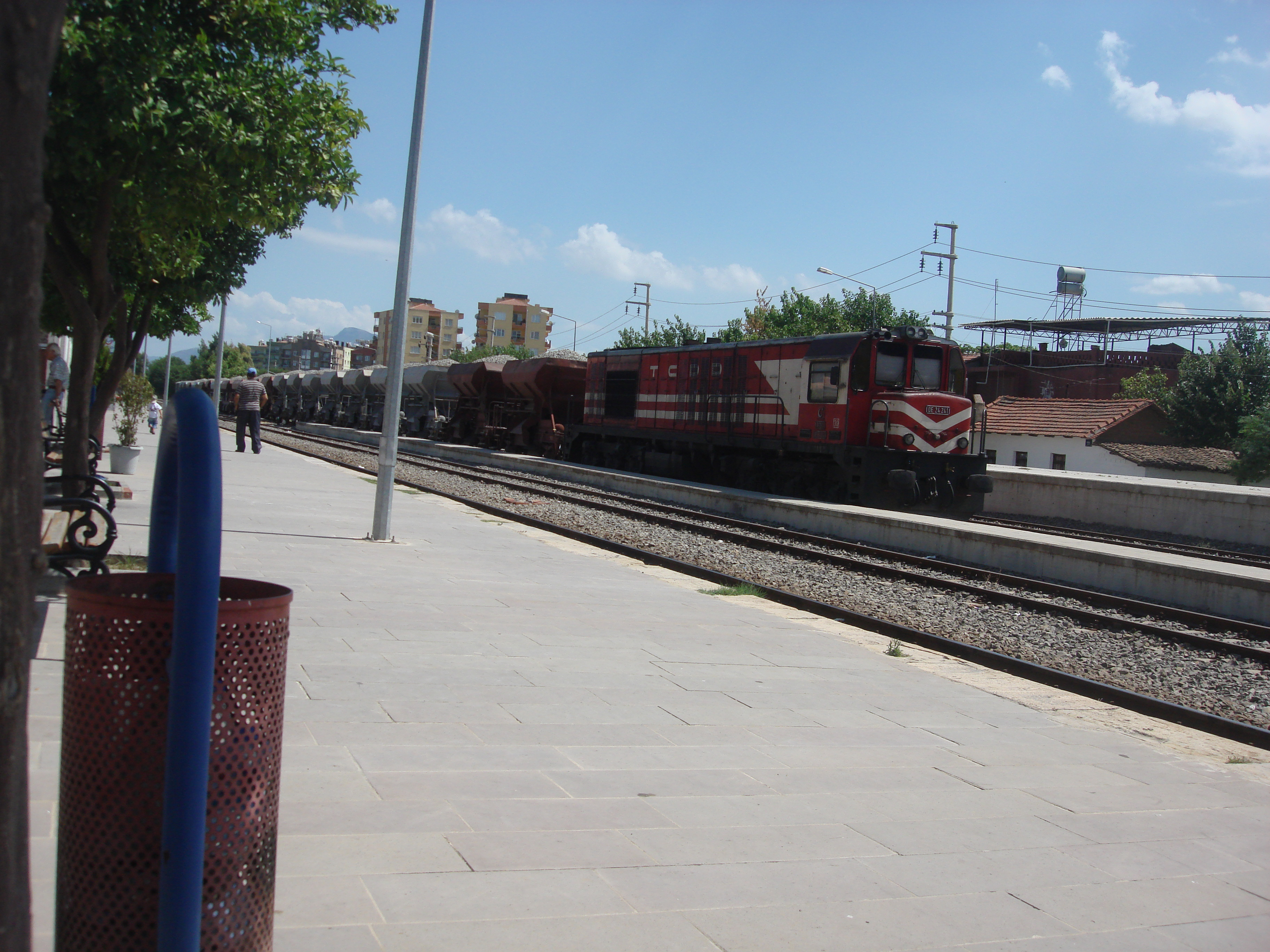
A freight train at Torbalı

TCDD Transport operate freight trains on all TCDD lines. TCDD Transport has a big fleet of covered goods wagons, flat wagons, tank wagons, open wagons and hoppers. TCDD Transport also has a few schnabel cars and crane cars. TCDD Transport carries freight such as bulk, shipping containers, liquids and goods.

As of 2012, 25.7 million ton is transported by rail in Turkey. Two steel companies, Erdemir and Kardemir, top 2 customers of TCDD, had transported 4.5 million ton in 2012, mainly iron ore and coal.

2.1 million tons of rail freight belong to international traffic. Most international traffic is between Turkey and Europe, routed via Kapikule. Several container trains run on this route as well as conventional wagons.

Containers are widely used both in international and domestic transportation. 7.6 million tonnes are carried in containers. TCDD is supporting transportation by containers. Thus almost all of the private railway companies invested in container wagons, and carrying 20% of all rail freight by their own wagons.

TCDD has plans to strengthen freight traffic by adding 4000 km conventional lines until 2023. That includes new international rail connections to Georgia, Iraq and Iran. TCDD is also constructing 18 logistic centers to enable transportation of more loads by rail.

TCDD is planning to increase its transit traffic (11,000 tonnes in 2011) by constructing an "iron silk road" to connect Europe to Asia. The Marmaray is the most important part of this project which is supposed to complete in 2015. Another project is the Kars–Tbilisi–Baku railway which will be completed in 2014. TCDD wants to have share from the freight traffic between Europe and China.

==== To Europe ====
As of May 2014, there are 3 companies organizing regular container trains between Turkey and Europe: IFB, Balo and Metrans. The weekly departures by these 3 companies is about 10 in each direction in total. By 16 June 2014 IFB ended direct container service to Turkey and started using vessel connection via Constanta powered by Global Multimodal.

There are also other services started in 2014 such as intermodal trailer service by Ulusoy Logistics and swapbody train by Transfesa.

== List of routes ==
TCDD Transport operates on the 12,532 km long Turkish rail network, and currently 90% is served by passenger trains.

=== High-speed services ===
Name	Type	Route	Numbers	Daily trip(s)	Route kilometres
Yüksek Hızlı Tren	High-speed	Ankara – Eskişehir	81103	1x	246
Yüksek Hızlı Tren	High-speed	Eskişehir-Ankara	81100	1x	246
Yüksek Hızlı Tren	High-speed	Ankara – Eskișehir – Bilecik – İzmit – Istanbul	81005, 81007, 81009, 81011, 81013, 81015, 81017, 81019, 81021, 81023 (Söğütlüçeşme); 81031, 81033 (Halkalı)	12x	594
Yüksek Hızlı Tren	High-speed	Istanbul– İzmit – Bilecik – Eskișehir – Ankara	81002, 81004, 81006, 81008, 81010, 81012, 81014, 81016, 81018, 81020, 81022, 81024 (Söğütlüçeşme); 81030, 81032 (Halkalı)	12x	594
Yüksek Hızlı Tren	High-speed	Ankara – Konya	81201, 81203, 81205, 81209	4x	312
Yüksek Hızlı Tren	High-speed	Konya-Ankara	81200, 81202, 81204, 81206	4x	312
Yüksek Hızlı Tren	High-speed	Ankara – Konya – Karaman	81271, 81273	2x	414
Yüksek Hızlı Tren	High-speed	Karaman – Konya – Ankara	81270, 81272, (81341+81206 Connection @ Konya)	2x	414
Yüksek Hızlı Tren	High-speed	Ankara – Kırıkkale - Yozgat – Sivas	81402, 81404	2x	
Yüksek Hızlı Tren	High-speed	Sivas – Yozgat – Kırıkkale - Ankara	81401, 81403	2x	
Yüksek Hızlı Tren	High-speed	Istanbul – İzmit – Bilecik – Eskişehir	81502	1x	
Yüksek Hızlı Tren	High-speed	Eskişehir – Bilecik – İzmit – Istanbul	81501	1x	
Yüksek Hızlı Tren	High-speed	Istanbul – İzmit – Bilecik – Eskişehir – Konya	81302, 81304, 81306, 81308	4x	
Yüksek Hızlı Tren	High-speed	Konya – Eskişehir – Bilecik – İzmit – Istanbul	81301, 81303, 81305, 81307	4x	
Yüksek Hızlı Tren	High-speed	Istanbul – İzmit – Bilecik – Eskişehir – Konya – Karaman	81340 (Halkalı), (81304+81273 Connection @ Konya)	1x	
Yüksek Hızlı Tren	High-speed	Karaman – İzmit – Bilecik – Eskişehir – Konya – Karaman	81341 (Halkalı), (81270+81305 Connection @ Konya)	1x	
Yüksek Hızlı Tren	High-speed	Istanbul – İzmit – Bilecik – Eskişehir – Ankara – Kırıkkale - Yozgat - Sivas	81458 (Halkalı), (81012+81404 Connection @ Ankara)	1x	
Yüksek Hızlı Tren	High-speed	Sivas – Yozgat – Kırıkkale – Ankara - Eskişehir – Bilecik – İzmit - Istanbul	813459 (Halkalı), (81401+81013 Connection @ Ankara)	1x	

=== Mainline services ===
The second main intercity service of the company are the mainline trains known as Express or Main Line (Turkish: Ekspres, Ana Hat). These trains connect major Turkish cities throughout the country but they are progressively stopped as the YHT network expands.

Name	Type	Route	Numbers	Daily round trips	Route kilometres
4th of September Blue Train	Blue	Ankara – Kırıkkale – Kayseri – Sivas – Malatya	22018, 52019	Daily	
İzmir Blue Train	Blue	İzmir – Manisa – Balıkesir – Kütahya – Eskişehir – Ankara	22006, 32005	Daily	824
Konya Blue Train	Blue	İzmir – Manisa – Uşak – Afyonkarahisar – Konya	72008, 32007	Daily	693
6th of September Express	Express	İzmir – Manisa – Balıkesir – Bandırma		Daily	341
17th of September Express	Express	İzmir – Manisa – Balıkesir – Bandırma		Daily	341
Aegean Express	Express	İzmir – Manisa – Balıkesir – Kütahya – Eskişehir	32011, 72018	Daily	576
Ankara Express	Express	Istanbul – İzmit – Bilecik – Eskişehir – Ankara	22001, 12002	Daily	610
Eastern Express	Express	Ankara – Kırıkkale – Kayseri – Sivas – Erzurum – Kars	22010, 42009	Daily	1,365
Erciyes Express	Express	Kayseri – Niğde – Adana	22002, 62001	Daily	
Lakes Express	Express	İzmir – Aydın – Denizli – Burdur – Isparta	32015, 72016	Daily	
Lake Van Express	Express	Ankara – Kırıkkale – Kayseri – Sivas – Malatya – Elazığ – Muş – Tatvan	22012, 52011	Twice-weekly	
Pamukkale Express	Express	Eskişehir – Kütahya – Afyonkarahisar – Denizli	72013, 72014	Daily	421
Roses Express	Express	İzmir – Aydın – Denizli – Burdur – Isparta		Daily	
Southern Kurtalan Express	Express	Ankara – Kırıkkale – Kayseri – Sivas – Malatya – Diyarbakır – Batman – Kurtalan	22014, 52013	5 weekly roundtrips	
Taurus Express	Express	Konya – Karaman – Adana	62005, 62006	Temporarily halted	668
Euphrates Express	Express	Adana – Osmaniye – Malatya – Elazığ		Temporarily suspended due to Earthquakes	
Touristic Eastern Express	Touristic	Ankara – Kırıkkale – Kayseri – Sivas – Erzurum – Kars		3 times a week	1,365

==== Blue Train ====
The Blue Train (Turkish: Mavi Tren) is the Turkish State Railways premier passenger train service started in the 1980s. The first, simply called Blue Train, operated between Istanbul and Ankara, entering service in 1979. More Blue Train services were added later on. The İzmir Blue Train, Central Anatolia Blue Train, Çukurova Blue Train and 4th of September Blue Train were overnight trains. These trains had custom railcars, built by TÜVASAŞ, all painted blue with a blue painted DE 24000 series locomotive pulling the train. The current remnant is just a branding with regular rolling stock. Today there are only three blue trains are in service.

===== Current services =====
- İzmir Blue Train (1984–) – Ankara-Eskişehir-Kütahya-Balıkesir-Manisa-Basmane (İzmir)
- 4th of September Blue Train (1993–2007, 2011–2016, 2021–) – Ankara-Kırıkkale-Kayseri-Sivas-Malatya
- Konya Blue Train (2012–) – Konya-Afyonkarahisar-Uşak-Manisa-Basmane (İzmir)

===== Former services =====
- Blue Train (1979–2000) – Haydarpaşa (Istanbul)-İzmit-Sakarya(Arifiye)-Bilecik-Eskişehir-Ankara
- Çukurova Blue Train (1986–2016) – Ankara-Kırıkkale-Kayseri (Boğazköprü)-Niğde-Adana (superseded by Erciyes Express)
- Central Anatolia Blue Train (1989–2012) – Haydarpaşa (Istanbul)-İzmit-Sakarya(Arifiye)-Bilecik-Enveriye (Eskişehir)-Kütahya-Afyonkarahisar-Konya-Karaman-Ulukışla (Niğde)-Adana (superseded by Taurus Express)
- Dumlupınar Blue Train (2001-2002) - Alsancak (İzmir)-Manisa-Uşak-Dumlupınar-Afyonkarahisar-Kütahya-Eskişehir-Ankara
- Gaziantep Blue Train (??-1991) Ankara-Kırıkkale-Kayseri (Boğazköprü)-Ulukışla (Niğde)-Adana-Gaziantep (superseded by Çukurova Blue Train)

=== Regional services ===
District 1

- Adapazarı–Gebze
- İstanbul–Edirne
- İstanbul–Uzunköprü

District 2

- Ankara–Polatlı
- Zonguldak–Karabük
- Zonguldak–Gökçebey

District 3

- Basmane–Alaşehir
- Basmane–Denizli
- Basmane–Nazilli
- Basmane–Ödemiş - 2nd busiest Regional line
- Basmane–Tire
- Basmane–Uşak
- Manisa–Alaşehir
- Söke–Denizli
- Söke–Nazilli

District 4

- Sivas–Divriği
- Sivas–Malatya
- Samsun–Amasya
- Samsun–Sivas

District 5

- Diyarbakır–Batman
- Elazığ–Tatvan

District 6

- Mersin–Adana - Busiest regional line
- Mersin–İskenderun
- Konya–Karaman
- Gaziantep–Nizip

District 7

- Eskişehir–Afyonkarahisar
- Eskişehir–Kütahya
- Eskişehir–Tavşanlı
- Kütahya–Balıkesir

District 9

- Erzincan–Divriği
- Kars–Akyaka

=== Former services ===
- 9th of September Express
- Anatolian Express
- Balkan Espress
- Boğaziçi Express
- Buca suburban
- Seydiköy suburban
- Central Anatolia Express
- Cumaovasi suburban
- Çukurova Blue Train
- Bornova suburban
- Succession Express
- Black Diamond Express
- Capital Express
- Dostluk/Filia Express
- Dumlupınar Blue Train
- Erzurum Express
- Eskişehir Express
- Fatih Express
- Friendship Express
- Friendship Train
- Gaziantep Blue Train
- Gaziantep-Nusaybin Regional
- Gülistan Express
- Haydarpaşa-Adapazarı Regional
- Haydarpaşa-Kurtalan Postal Train
- Haydarpaşa suburban
- Istanbul suburban
- İzmir-Diyarbakır Postal Train
- Karesi Express
- Kocatepe Express
- Marmara Express
- Meram Express
- Orient Express
- Republic Express
- Sakarya Express
- Soma Express

== Rolling Stock ==
As of the end of 2024, there are a total of 551 mainline locomotives (426 diesel and 125 electric), 108 shunting locomotives, 189 conventional train sets (98 diesel and 91 electric), and 31 high-speed train sets. Additionally, there are a total of 17,378 registered freight wagons, including 17,133 commercial freight wagons and 245 administrative freight wagons, as well as 623 registered passenger wagons.

=== Locomotives ===
Model	Picture	Numbers	Built	In service	Type	Power	Builder (Designer)	Notes
Road power
DE24000		24001-24418	1970–84	232	Diesel-electric	2160 hp (1600 kW)	TÜLOMSAŞ (MTE)	430 were built in total for TCDD's complete dieselization of its fleet.
DE18000		18001	1971	1	Diesel-electric	1800 hp (1320 kW)	TÜLOMSAŞ (MTE)	5 were built in total. Based on DE2400.
DE18100		18101-18120	1971-78	2	Diesel-electric	1800 hp (1320 kW)	TÜLOMSAŞ (MTE)	20 were built in total. Based on DE2400.
DE22000		22001-22086	1985–89	86	Diesel-electric	2000 hp (1470 kW)	TÜLOMSAŞ (Electro-Motive Division)	Based on EMD G26
E43000		43001-43045	1987-97	45	Electric	4260 hp (3180 kW)	TÜLOMSAŞ (Toshiba)	Based on JNR Class EF63
DE33000		33001-33089	2003–04	89	Diesel-electric	3000 hp (2220 kW)	TÜLOMSAŞ (Electro-Motive Diesel)	Based on EMD GT26CW-2.
E68000		68001-68080	2013–16	80	Electric	6800 hp (5000 kW)	TÜLOMSAŞ (EUROTEM)	First 8 built by Hyundai Rotem, later 72 are being built by TÜLOMSAŞ.
DE36000		36001-36020	2013–15	20	Diesel-electric	3600 hp (2680 kW)	TÜLOMSAŞ (General Electric)	Based on GE PowerHaul.
E5000		5001	2023-	1	Electric	6800 hp (5000 kW)	TÜRASAŞ	Developed under National Electric Main Line Loco project. Also, a 6-axle variant dubbed E56000 is in development. 95 on order.
Switchers
DE11000		11001-11085	1985-91	58	Diesel-electric	1065 hp (780 kW)	TÜLOMSAŞ (Krauss-Maffei)	85 built in total. First 20 by Krauss-Maffei later 60 by TÜLOMSAŞ.
DH7000		7001–7020	1994-98	20	Diesel Hydraulic	710 hp (522 kW)	TÜLOMSAŞ	
DH9500		9501–9526	1999-2003	26	Diesel Hydraulic	950 hp (700 kW)	TÜLOMSAŞ	Based on DE11000.
DE13400		13401-13402	2014	2	Diesel-electric	1340 hp (522 kW)	TÜLOMSAŞ (CZ LOKO)	
E1000		1000	2015	1	Electric	1360 hp (1000 kW)	TÜLOMSAŞ (TÜBİTAK MAM)	Electric-only adaptation of DE11000.
DE10000		10000	2025-	1	Diesel-electric	1000 hp (750 kW)	TÜRASAŞ	Developed under National Switcher project.

=== Multiple Units ===
Model	Picture	Numbers	Built	In service	Type	Power	Builder (Designer)	Notes
Regional trains
E14000		14010 & 14025	1978-80	2	EMU	520 kW	TÜVASAŞ (Alstom)	A total of 75 were built. 2 were overhauled in 2019 to be used for regional services.
MT15000		15001-15012	2008-09	12	DMU	650 kW	EUROTEM	Used for regional services.
MT15400		15401-15452	2011-13	52	DMU	650 kW	TÜVASAŞ (EUROTEM)	Developed under National Diesel Trainset project. Used for regional services.
TCDD E44000		44001-44032	2023–	32	EMU	650 kW	TÜRASAŞ	Developed under National Electric Trainset project. Used for regional services.
Commuter trains
E22000		22001–22033	2010–11	33	EMU		CAF	İZBAN commuter rail.
E22100		22101–22140	2012–15	40	EMU		EUROTEM	İZBAN commuter rail.
E23000		23001-23033	2009–13	32	EMU		EUROTEM	Adaray and Başkentray commuter rail.
E32000		32001-32021	2011–15	20	EMU		EUROTEM	Marmaray commuter rail.
E64000		64001-64035	2011–15	34	EMU		EUROTEM	Marmaray commuter rail. 10-car version of the E32000.
E39000		39001	2025–	1	EMU		TÜRASAŞ	Developed under National Suburban Train project. Gaziray commuter rail.
High-speed trains
HT65000		65001-65012	2007–09	12	EMU	4800 kW	CAF	Used for YHT services.
HT80000		80001 & 80101-80118	2010–20	19	EMU	8000 kW	Siemens	Used for YHT services.
HT7000		70001	2023-	1	EMU	8000 kW	TÜRASAŞ	Developed under National High-Speed Train project. Used for YHT services.

=== Railcars ===
Model	Picture	Numbers	Built	In service	Type	Power	Builder (Designer)	Notes
MT5500		5501-5510	1990-93	1	Railcar		Fiat	10 were built for to be used in regional services. Nostalgic service.
MT5600		5601-5610	1993-97	7	Railcar		TÜLOMSAŞ	10 were built for to be used in regional services. Nostalgic service.
MT5700		5701-5730	1993-95	27	Railcar		Fiat	30 were built for to be used in regional services. Reserve service.

=== Passenger cars ===
Model	Picture	In service	Type	Builder (Designer)
Regional Fleet		1950-70	Coach	TÜVASAŞ
Pullman Fleet		1970–90	Coach, Couchette, Diner, Generator	TÜVASAŞ
TVS2000		1992-	Coach, Diner, Couchette, Sleeper, Generator, VIP	TÜVASAŞ (Past), TÜRASAŞ (Present)

=== Retired fleet ===
==== Locomotives ====
Model	Picture	Numbers	Built	Acquired	Type	Power	Builder (Designer)	Notes
Road power
E4000		4001–4003	1955	1955	Electric	2170 hp (1620 kW)	Alsthom	Ordered for use on TCDD's first electrified line.
DE20000		20001-20005	1957–58	1957–58	Diesel Electric	1800 hp (1320 kW)	General Electric	
E2000		2000	1955	1961	Electric	2346 hp (1750 kW)	MTE	Ex SNCF BBB 20003
DH27000		27001-27003	1961	1961	Diesel Hydraulic	????	Krauss-Maffei	
DE21500		21501-21540	1964–65	1965	Diesel Electric	1580 hp (2150 kW)	General Electric	
E40000		40001-40015	1969	1971–1973	Electric	???? hp (2945 kW)	Alsthom and TÜVASAŞ (Groupement 50 Hz)	
E52500		52501-52520	1967	1998–2005	Electric	5180 hp (3860 kW)	Končar (ASEA)	Originally built in 1967 as class 441, acquired and overhauled by TCDD in 1998. Returned after loan contract end.
Switchers
DH33100		33101-33105	1953	1953	Diesel Hydraulic	350 hp (260 kW)	MaK	TCDD's first diesel locomotive.
DH44100		44101-44106	1955	1955	Diesel Hydraulic	800 hp (590 kW)	MaK	
DH6000		6001	1959	1959	Diesel Hydraulic	610 hp (445 kW)	Jenbacher	Type DH600C
DH4100		4101	1960	1960	Diesel Hydraulic	410 hp (300 kW)	Jenbacher	Type DH400C
DH6500		6501–6540	1960	1960	Diesel Hydraulic	650 hp (480 kW)	Krupp	
DH3600		3601–3624	1968	1968	Diesel Hydraulic	350 hp (260 kW)	MaK	Based on the DE22000.
DH11500		11501-11511	1960	1982	Diesel Hydraulic	1100 hp (810 kW)	MaK	Acquired from Deutsche Bahn in 1982.

==== Trainsets ====
Model	Picture	Numbers	Built	Type	Power	Builder (Designer)	Notes
MT5200		5201–5202	1944	DMU	840 hp	MAN	
MT5300		5301–5516	1951	DMU	1100 hp	MAN	
E8000		8001–8030	1955	EMU	1020 kW	Alsthom	
MT5500		5501–5511	1968	DMU	580 hp	Fiat	
E14000		14001-14075	1979	EMU	1040 kW	TÜVASAŞ (Groupement 50 Hz)	

==== Railcars ====
Model	Picture	Numbers	Built	Type	Power	Builder (Designer)	Notes
1-6		5401–5420	1934	Railcar	85 hp	Škoda	
21-25		5401–5420	1935	Railcar	130 hp	MAN	
MV5100		5401–5420	1942	Railcar	210 hp	Uerdingen	
MT5400		5401–5420	1954	Railcar	300 hp	SCCF	
RM3000		5401–5420	1960	Railcar	340 hp	Uerdingen/Germany	
MT5600			1990	Railcar	550 hp	TÜVASAŞ	Used for regional services
