= Samsun-Amasya Regional =

Rail service in Turkey

Samsun-Amasya Bölgesel
Overview
- Service type: Regional rail
- Status: Operating
- Locale: Black Sea Region
- Current operator: Turkish State Railways

Route
- Termini: Samsun railway station Amasya railway station
- Average journey time: 3 hours
- Service frequency: Daily

On-board services
- Class: Classless
- Disabled access: Limited
- Seating arrangements: Coach
- Catering facilities: No

Technical
- Track gauge: 1,435 mm (4 ft 8 1/2 in)
- Track owner: Turkish State Railways

The Samsun-Amasya Regional is a rail service operated by TCDD Transport. It runs daily between the Black Sea city of Samsun and the inland town of Amasya. The trains operate on the Samsun–Kalın railway. It takes 3 hours to travel 133 km and has been criticised as very slow.
