= Amasya railway station =

Railway station in Amasya, Turkey

AMASYA

General information
- Location: İstasyon cad. Amasya; Turkey
- Coordinates: 40.6541°N 35.8157°E
- System: TCDD
- Owner: Turkish State Railways
- Operator: TCDD Taşımacılık
- Line: Samsun–Kalın railway

History
- Opened: 1927
Location
- Location within Turkey

Amasya station on the Turkish rail network was built in 1927, near the Yeşilırmak River in the town of Amasya. It is on the Samsun-Kalın railway, which connects the Black Sea city of Samsun to the central Anatolian city of Sivas. Passenger train services are the daily Samsun-Amasya Regional and the thrice weekly Sivas-Samsun Regional.
