= Samsun-Sivas Regional =

Rail service in Turkey

Samsun-Sivas Bölgesel
Overview
- Service type: Regional rail
- Status: Operating
- Locale: Black Sea Region and Central Anatolia
- Current operator: Turkish State Railways

Route
- Termini: Sivas railway station Samsun railway station
- Distance travelled: 431 km
- Average journey time: 8 hours
- Service frequency: 3 trains per week each way

On-board services
- Class: Classless
- Disabled access: Limited
- Seating arrangements: Coach
- Catering facilities: No

Technical
- Track gauge: 1,435 mm (4 ft 8 1/2 in)
- Track owner: Turkish State Railways

The Samsun-Sivas Regional is an intercity rail service operated by TCDD Transport. It operates between two major cities of Turkey, Sivas and Samsun, and also services touristic Amasya. Apart from a short stretch near Sivas the trains operate on the Samsun–Kalın railway. It takes 8 hours to travel 431 km and has been criticised as very slow.
