= TCDD MT5200 =

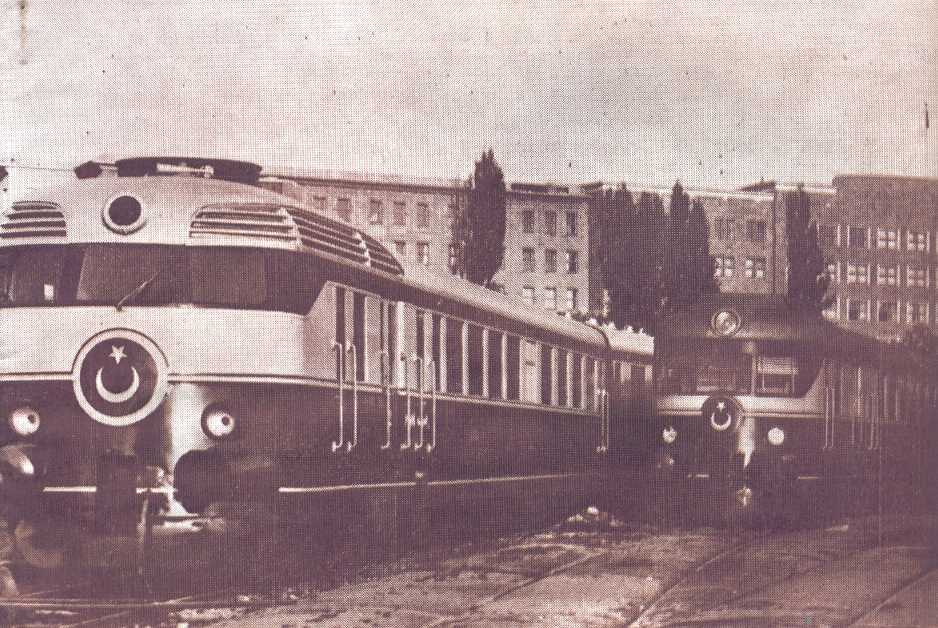
- MT5200 (left) and MT5300 (right)
- Manufacturer: MAN
- Replaced: Steam trains
- Entered service: 1944
- Number built: 2
- Successor: TCDD MT5700; TCDD MT 30000
- Formation: 2-car 3-car (1954–)
- Capacity: 127
- Operators: Turkish State Railways
- Lines served: Istanbul, Ankara, Adana, Zonguldak

Specifications
- Car length: 47,235 mm (total)
- Maximum speed: 120 km/h
- Weight: 90 t
- Prime mover(s): MAN L12V 17,5/18
- Power output: 618 kW
- Track gauge: 1,435 mm (4 ft 8 1/2 in)

TCDD MT5200 was a series of diesel multiple units operated by the Turkish State Railways. On October 25, 1940, an order for six two-car diesel multiple units was placed with MAN SE (MAN). Because of World War II, only the first two units were delivered, the remaining being delivered to other countries. Three units went to the state railways of the (First) Slovak Republic, ('Slovak Railways', Slovak: Slovenské železnice-SŽ), and one unit stayed in Germany with the Deutsche Bundesbahn. In 1954 MAN delivered an additional two centre cars, to allow conversion to three-car units.
