= TCDD DH3600 =

DH3600
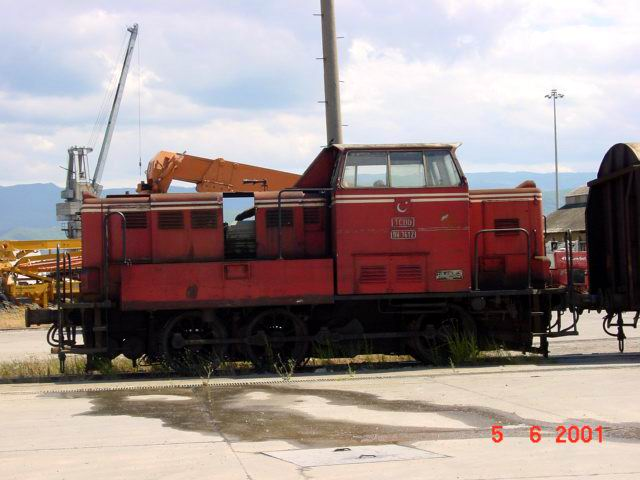
- TCDD DH3612
Type and origin
- Power type: Diesel-hydraulic
- Designer: Maschinenbau Kiel
- Builder: Tüvasaş
- Build date: 1968
- Total produced: 24
Specifications
- Configuration
  - UIC: AhB
- Gauge: 1,435 mm (4 ft 8 1/2 in)
- Bogies: 1
- Length: 9.2 m (30 ft 2 in)
- Width: 3,010 millimetres (9 ft 11 in)
- Height: 4,200 millimetres (13 ft 9 in)
- Loco weight: 32.5 tonnes (32.0 long tons; 35.8 short tons)
- Fuel capacity: 1,500 L (330 imp gal; 400 US gal)
- Prime mover: 4-stroke Diesel
- RPM range
  - RPM low idle: 600
  - RPM idle: 1000
  - Maximum RPM: 2100
- Engine type: Cummins KTA19 (DH3610)
- Aspiration: Naturally aspirated
- Cylinders: Inline 6
- Transmission: Voith turbo transmission
- Loco brake: Block break, parking pawl
- Train brakes: Air
Performance figures
- Maximum speed: 30 kilometres per hour (19 mph) (TCDD); 50 kilometres per hour (31 mph) (Raykent DH3610)
- Power output: 260 kW (350 hp) (12 units); 330 kW (440 hp) (11 units); 410 kW (550 hp) (1 unit)
Career
- Operators: Turkish State Railways (depot operations only); Raykent Lojistik (slow moving operations)
- Numbers: DH3601 – DH3624
- Nicknames: "Samsun" (DH3610)

DH3600 were diesel-hydraulic locomotive built for shunting operations on the Turkish State Railways. 38 units were built by Tüvasaş under licence from Maschinenbau Kiel (MaK). In 1980-1981 the shunters were rebuilt with Cummins Diesel KT1150L engines.
