= TCDD Suburban Fleet =

Turkish passenger railcar

Suburban Fleet
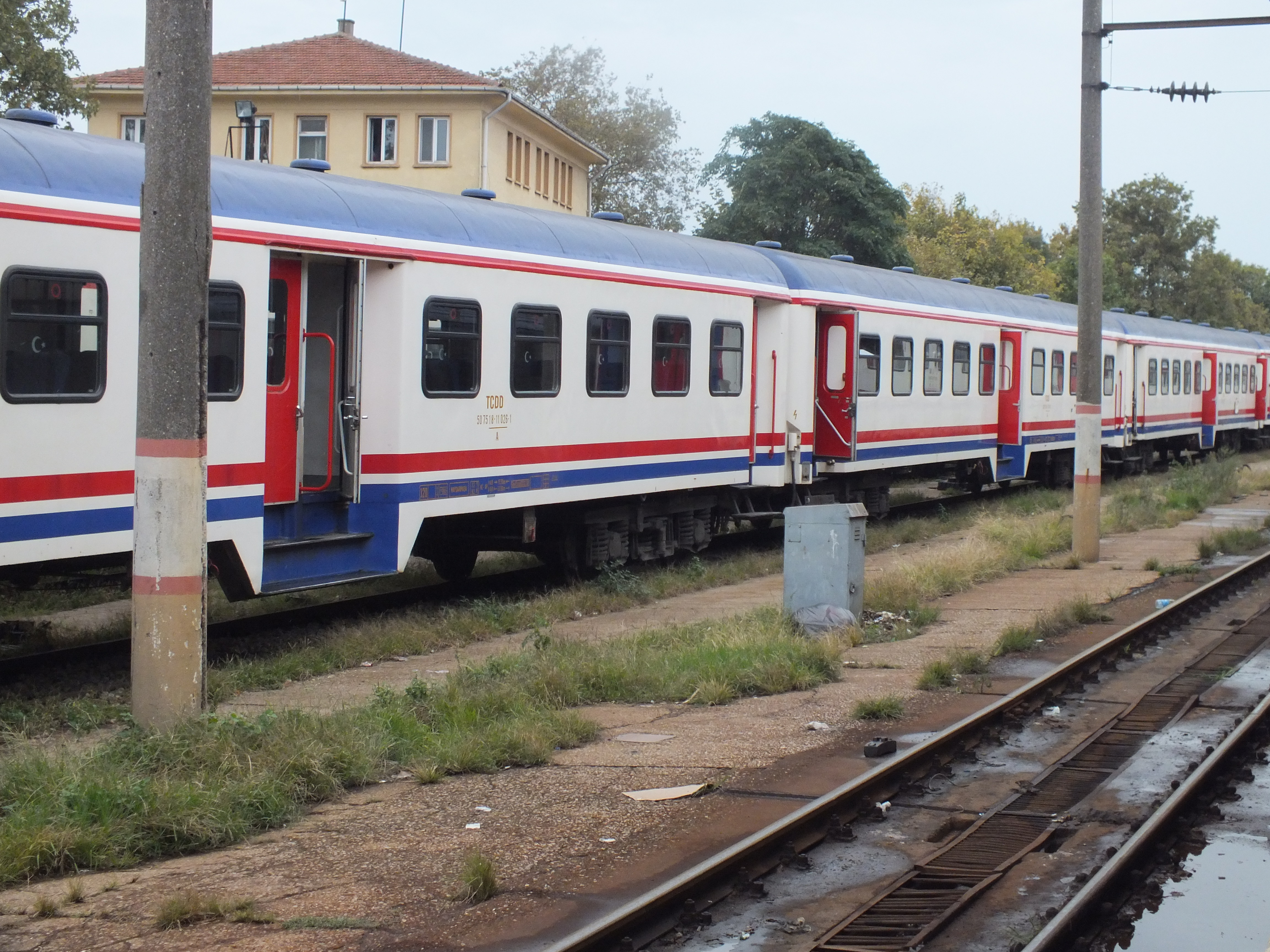
- A couple of Regional Cars on a side track at Haydarpaşa Terminal
- In service: All retired, stored as a last resort
- Manufacturer: TÜVASAŞ; SGP
- Built at: Adapazarı Plant
- Constructed: 1953-1972
- Entered service: 1953-2012
- Refurbished: 2002-06
- Successor: electrical multiple units
- Operators: Turkish State Railways

Specifications
- Car body construction: Welded steel
- Floor height: 1,100.0 mm (3 ft 7 1/4 in)
- Entry: step
- Doors: 1 to 3 per car
- Maximum speed: 100 km/h (62 mph)
- Coupling system: Buffer and chain
- Track gauge: 1,435 mm (4 ft 8 1/2 in)

The Suburban Fleet (Turkish: Banliyö vagonları, also known as pierced bellies (Turkish: Karnıyarık)) were passenger railcars used by the Turkish State Railways on their suburban rail operations mainly in Istanbul, Ankara and İzmir. Those cars are kept in the depots as a last resort in emergencies.
