= TCDD MT5500 =

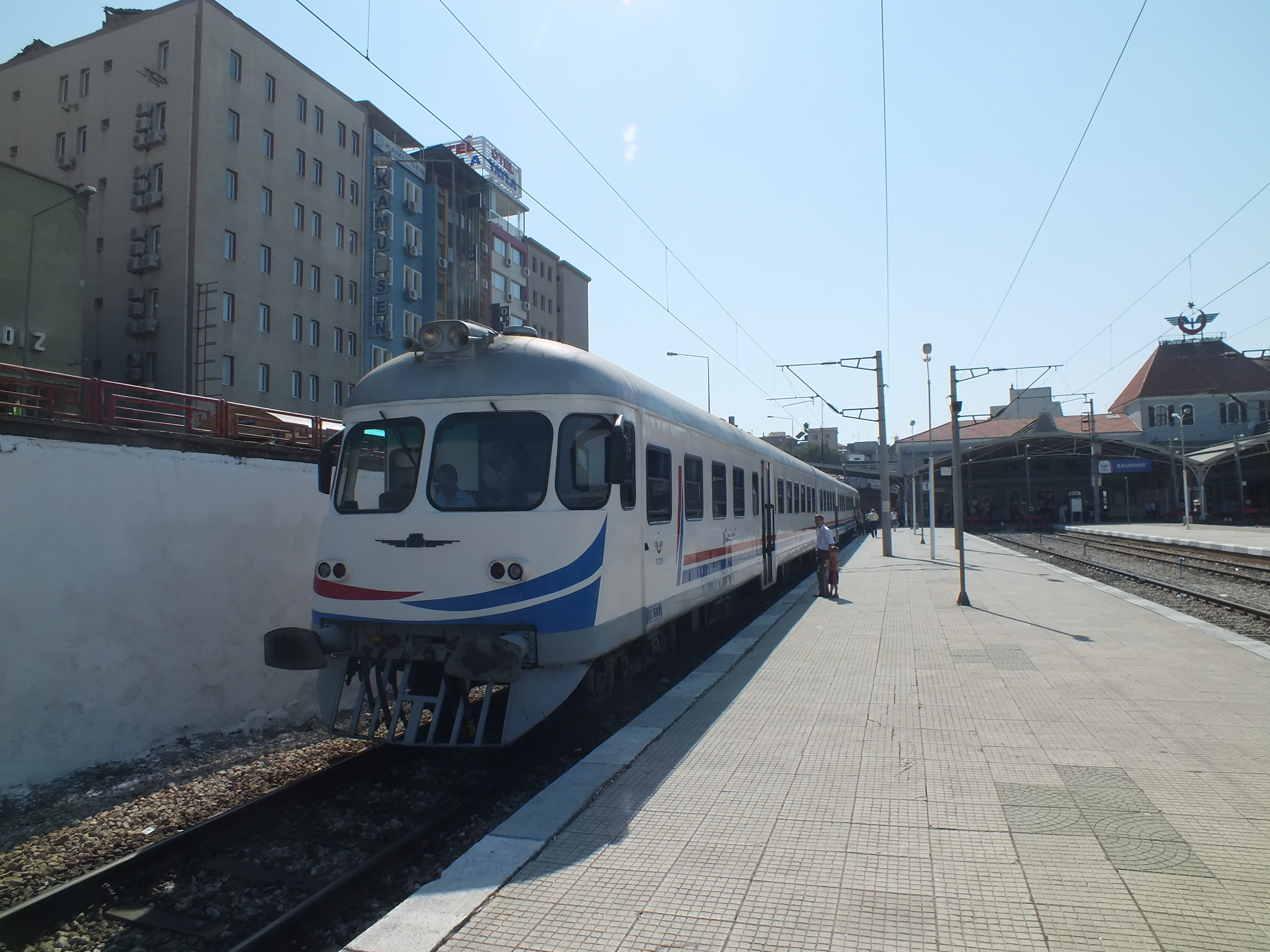
- MT55097 at Basmane station.
- In service: Regional passenger service
- Manufacturer: Fiat
- Family name: Three car regional railcar
- Replaced: Steam trains
- Constructed: 1960–1961
- Entered service: 1961
- Number built: 11
- Successor: Three carriage model of TCDD MT30000
- Formation: 3 cars, motor car on each end with a trailer in between
- Capacity: 199
- Operators: Turkish State Railways

Specifications
- Car length: 60.7 m (total)
- Width: 2.9 m
- Height: 4 m
- Entry: step entry, with a possibility of level boarding from a high platform
- Doors: 3 each side
- Maximum speed: 90 km/h alone or in pairs, 85km/h when coupled with a MT5700
- Weight: 34.7 t (motor car); 21.8 t (trailer)
- Prime mover(s): 4 x Fiat Diesel 203.0 S, 2 in each power car
- Power output: 810 kW
- Transmission: 5 speed semi-automatic with reverser, first four gears attached via fluid coupling, 5th gear direct mechanical
- Braking system(s): hydraulic
- Safety system(s): Dead man's switch
- Track gauge: 1,435 mm (4 ft 8 1/2 in)

TCDD MT5500 was a series of diesel multiple units operated by the Turkish State Railways. The trains were used on intercity services, and offered higher speeds and comfort than steam powered trains. The DMUs were built in Italy by Fiat, and a total of 11 units were delivered in 1960-61. Trailer cars have registration numbers in the 55000 range instead of the usual 5500 range.

== Fate ==
Two units in this series have experienced an accident after which they have been refitted as line inspection locomotives. Other units are currently being unused, however, they are kept in a workable condition as last resort units to temporarily replace other MUs in emergencies.
