= TCDD MT15000 =

TCDD DM15000
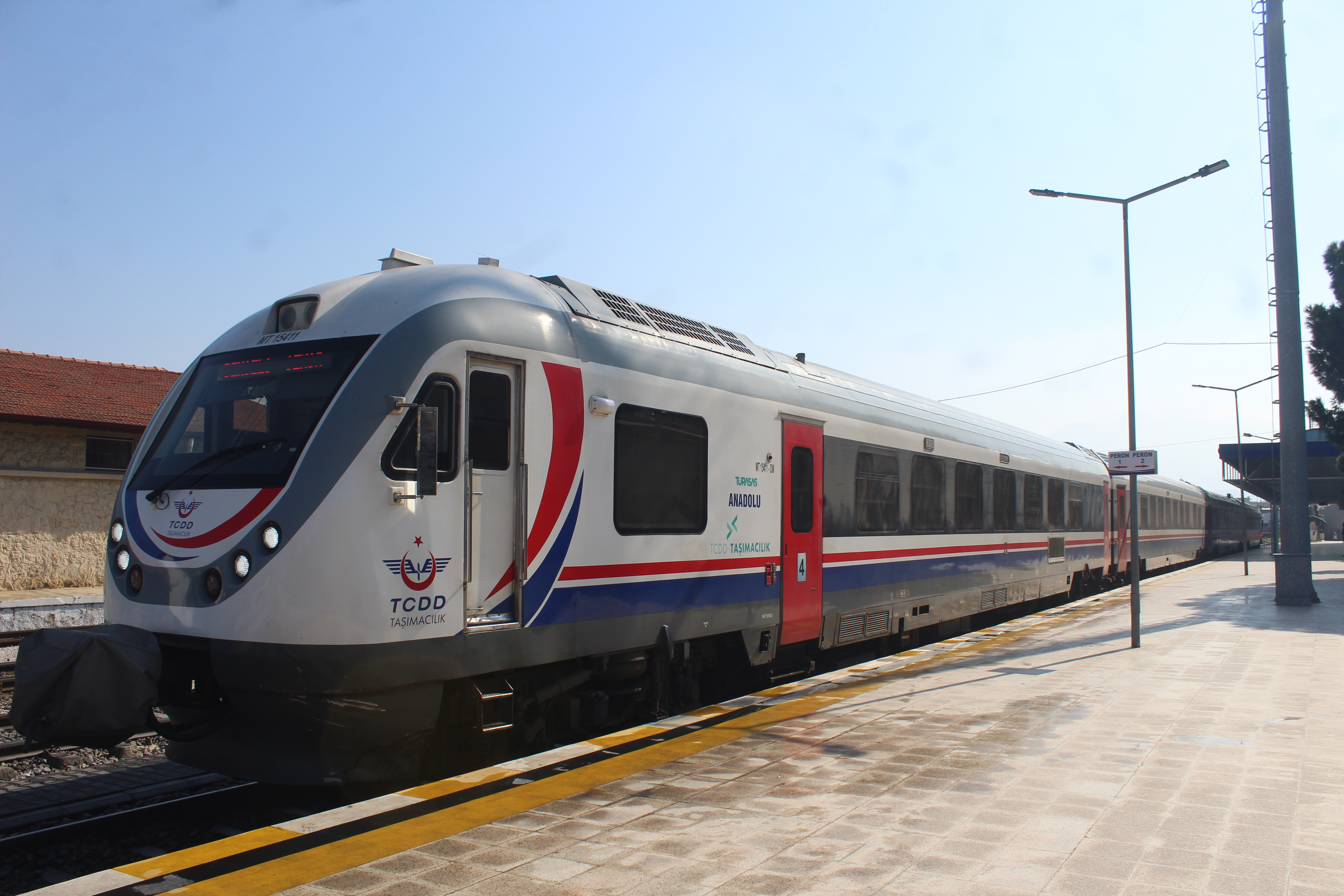
- A DM15000 set pulling a regional train at Torbalı.
- In service: 2008 – present
- Manufacturer: EUROTEM later TÜRASAŞ
- Replaced: TCDD MT5200 and some trips of TCDD MT5700
- Entered service: 2008-
- Number built: 12
- Number in service: 12
- Capacity: 440
- Operator: TCDD
- Depot: Adapazarı Depot
- Lines served: Basmane-Nazilli Regional; Basmane-Ödemiş Regional; Basmane-Tire Regional; Basmane-Söke Regional; Aydın-Söke Regional; Eskişehir-Kütahya Regional; Eskişehir-Afyon Regional; Adana-Mersin Regional; Karabük-Zonguldak Regional Line- Zonguldak Gökçebey Regional Line

Specifications
- Car body construction: Stainless steel
- Car length: 26.4 m (86 ft 7 in)
- Width: 2.825 m (9 ft 3.2 in)
- Height: 4.05 m (13 ft 3 in)
- Doors: 4 Sliding doors
- Maximum speed: 140 km/h (87 mph)
- Traction system: Diesel-hydraulic
- Prime mover: Cummins QSK19R
- Power output: 750 horsepower (560 kW) each powered carriage
- Transmission: Voith T312
- Acceleration: up to 1 metre per second squared (3.3 ft/s^{2})
- Deceleration: 1.2 metres per second squared (3.9 ft/s^{2})
- Auxiliaries: Cummins ISBe 6.7
- Power supply: 110 VDC
- HVAC: Air Conditioning (16,700 kcal/h/set)
- UIC classification: B-B + B-B
- Bogies: Blosterless Bogie, Out-board type
- Braking systems: Knorr pneumatic braking, transmission retarder
- Safety systems: Dead man's switch, overspeeding protection, emergency brake
- Coupling system: Scharfenberg (see below)
- Multiple working: Yes, can either be coupled with an identical set or TCDD MT30000
- Track gauge: 1,435 mm (4 ft 8 1/2 in)

The TCDD MT15000 is TCDD's newest diesel multiple unit (DMU) series. The DMUs were built by EUROTEM in Adapazarı, Turkey. These DMUs operate on most diesel operated regional lines in Turkey. Later on, an improved version dubbed MT15400 replaced the production with TÜRASAŞ.
