= TCDD UIC-X Fleet =

Type of passenger railcar formerly used in Turkey

UIC-X
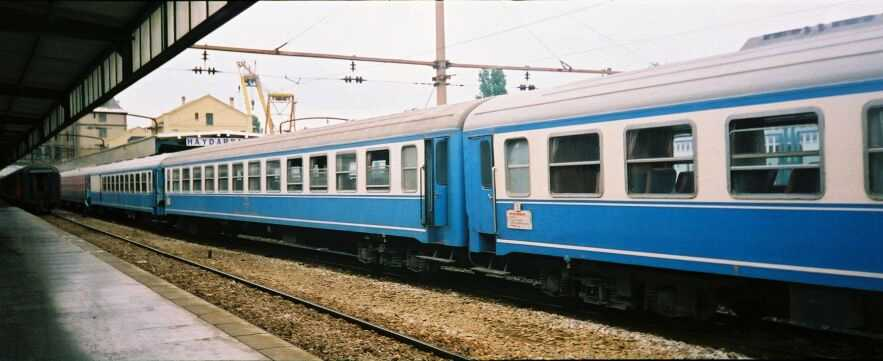
- UIC-X coaches at Haydarpaşa station.
- In service: Retired or refurbished into modernized coaches.
- Manufacturer: TÜVASAŞ
- Built at: Adapazarı Plant
- Family name: UIC-X
- Constructed: 1975
- Entered service: 1975-2010s
- Refurbished: 2010s
- Number built: N/A
- Operators: Turkish State Railways

Specifications
- Car body construction: Welded steel
- Car length: 26.4 m (86 ft 7 in)
- Width: 2.825 m (9 ft 3.2 in)
- Height: 4.05 m (13 ft 3 in)
- Floor height: 1.25 m (4 ft 1 in)
- Platform height: 480 millimetres (19 in) preferred
- Entry: Step entry
- Doors: Manually opened/closed doors
- Maximum speed: 120 km/h (75 mph)
- Coupling system: Screw and buffer coupling
- Track gauge: 1,435 mm (4 ft 8 1/2 in)

TCDD UIC-X coaches were a type of passenger railcar that the Turkish State Railways operated on most express and regional trains from the 1970s to the early 2000s. These cars were built by TÜVASAŞ at their Adapazarı plant in cooperation with the International Union of Railways (UIC) in order to standardize Turkish railcars with international standards. Before the TVS2000 became the new standard of the railway, these coaches were the most popular railcar in the country. Beginning in the 2000s, they have been slowly phased out, with a large majority of them being retired or refurbished into modernized railcars, similar to the TVS2000s.
