= TCDD E44000 =

Electric trainset on Turkish railways

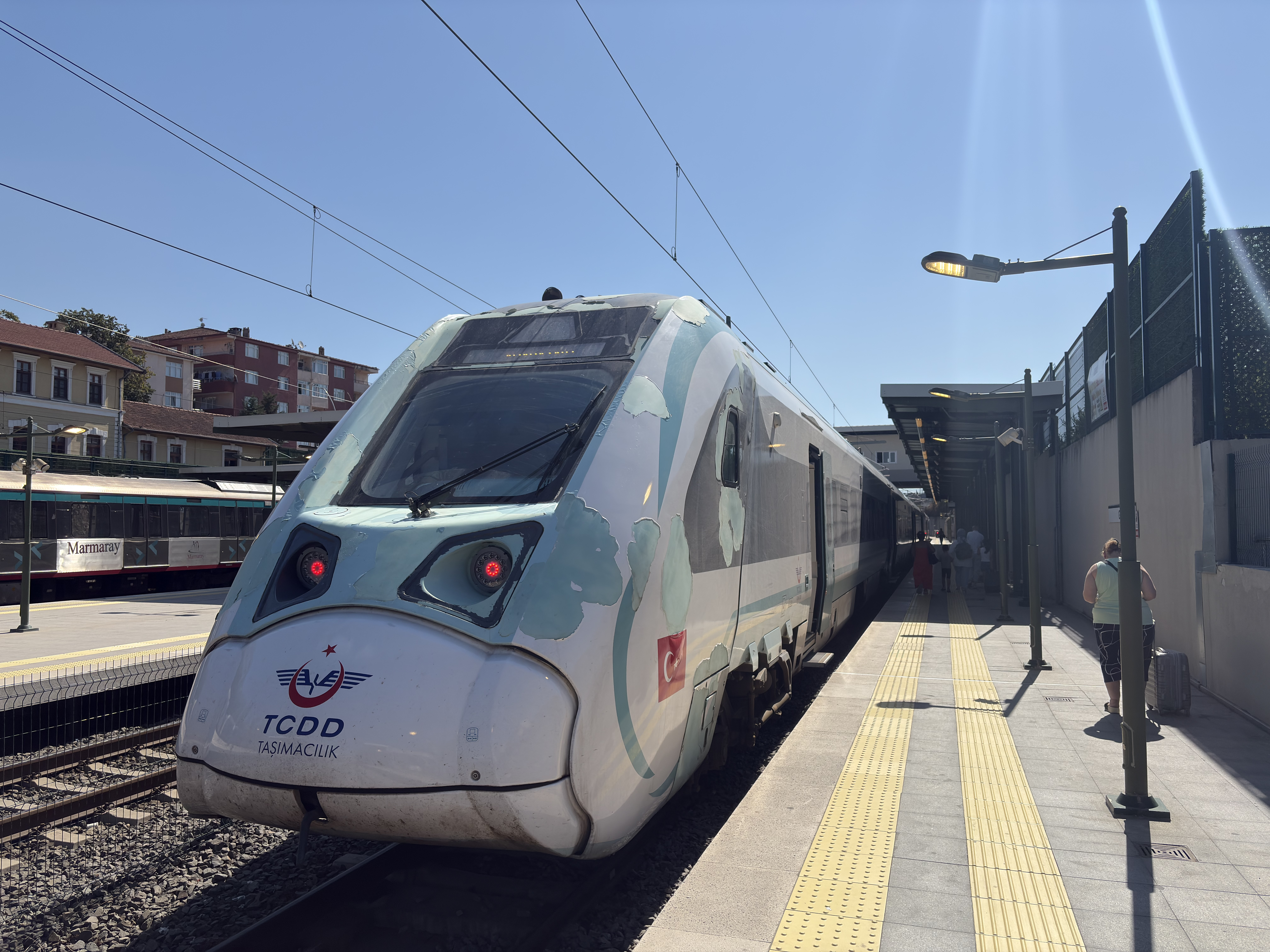
- E44003, in Gebze railway station
- In service: 2023–present
- Manufacturer: TÜRASAŞ
- Designer: TÜRASAŞ
- Entered service: 2023
- Number built: 6
- Capacity: 324 (5 car)
- Operator: TCDD Taşımacılık
- Line served: Ada Express

Specifications
- Train length: 135 m (442 ft 11 in)
- Maximum speed: Service: 160 km/h (100 mph); Design: 176 km/h (110 mph)
- Axle load: <18t
- Electric system: 25 kV 50 Hz AC Catenary
- Track gauge: 1,435 mm (4 ft 8 1/2 in)

TCDD E44000, also referred to as the "National Electric Train" (Turkish: "Milli Elektrikli Tren") by the media, is a model of electric trainset produced by TÜVASAŞ (now under TÜRASAŞ) for TCDD Taşımacılık. Trains started to be delivered to the Turkish State Railways (TCDD) on 27 April 2023.

== Usage ==
The first unit produced for TCDD Transport was delivered to the Adapazarı train station on 27 April 2023. After being exhibited at various stations in Istanbul in May, the train made its inaugural journey on May 27 along the Adapazarı-Gebze line. TÜRASAŞ plans to export E44000 units to European Union countries in the following years.

== Design ==
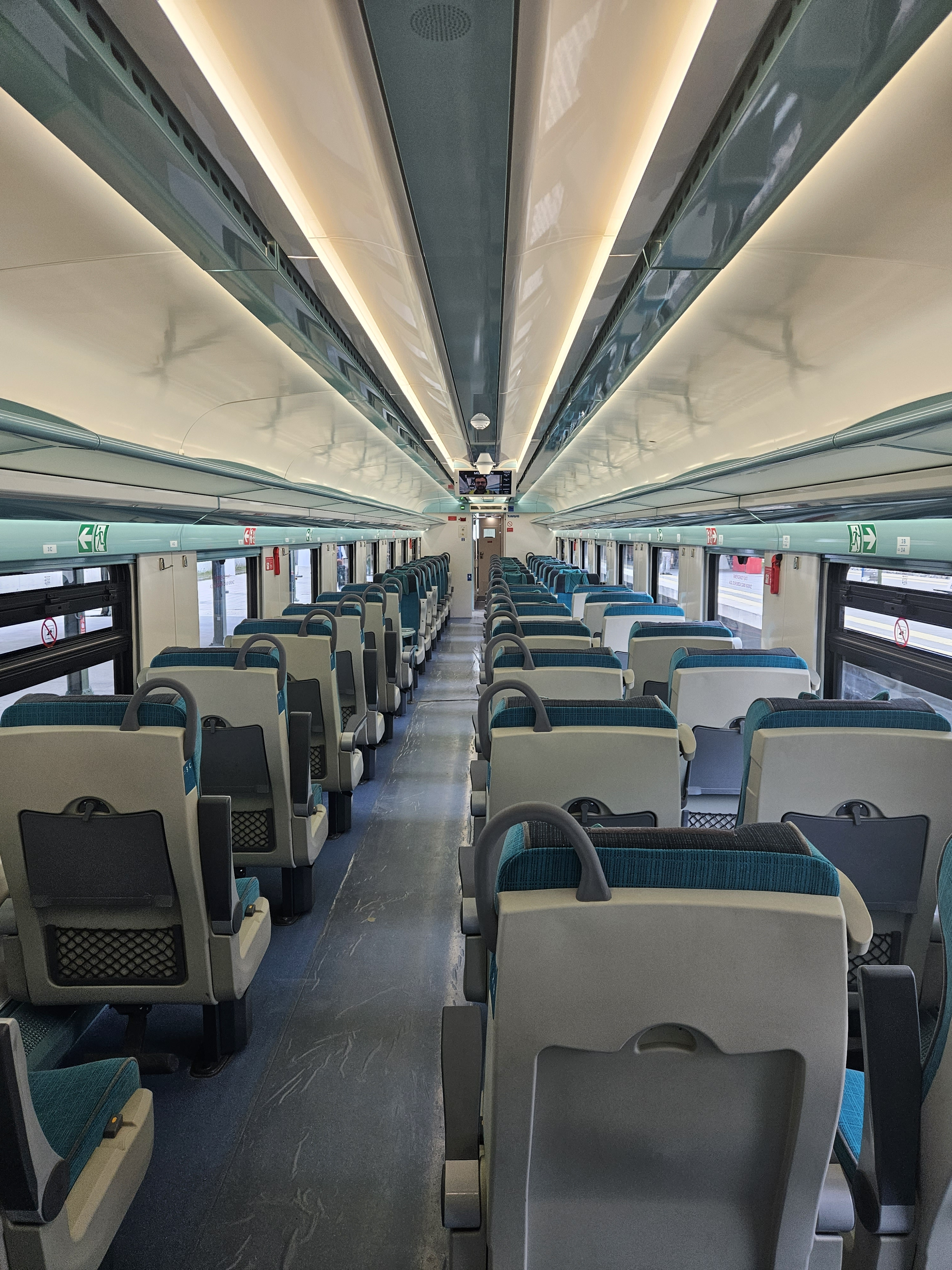
Interior of the rolling stock.

The trains operational speed is at 160 km/h (100 mph), with a design speed of 176 km/h (110 mph). The trains can consist of 3, 4, 5 or 6 cars depending on demand. The capacity of 5-car sets are 324 people. There are currently 3 sets in existence, with 2 being prototypes and 1 currently being used on the Ada Express. By the end of 2025, 15 sets are planned on being produced and by the end of 2030, 56 sets are planned on being produced.

== Production and testing history ==
In 2013, TÜVASAŞ was tasked with the production of domestically-produced diesel and electrical multiple unit trains. TÜVASAŞ originally planned on first delivering the electrical, and later the diesel multiple units, with a deadline to test the first prototype in December 2018. This date was then postponed to 2020, and later 2022. In 2020, with TÜVASAŞ merging with other railcar producers to form TÜRASAŞ, responsibility of the project was transferred to TÜRASAŞ.

The prototype units were manufactured with a goal of being 65% domestically produced, with the mass produced units having a goal of being 75% domestically made. The traction motor, transformer, transmission, control and management system are all supplied by Aselsan. The train was planned to reach an operational speed of 225 km/h (140 mph) by the end of 2023, but this has since been made its own project.

The testing of the first five E44000 units produced at the Turkish Wagon Production Factory (Turkish: Türkiye Vagon Sanayi Fabrikası) began in June 2020. After test drives that started in July 2021, 10,000 kilometers were covered as of September 2022. As of April 2023, 3 sets had been completed, with a total of 56 sets being planned to be produced by 2030.

== See also ==
- TÜRASAŞ
