= TCDD DH27000 =

DH27000
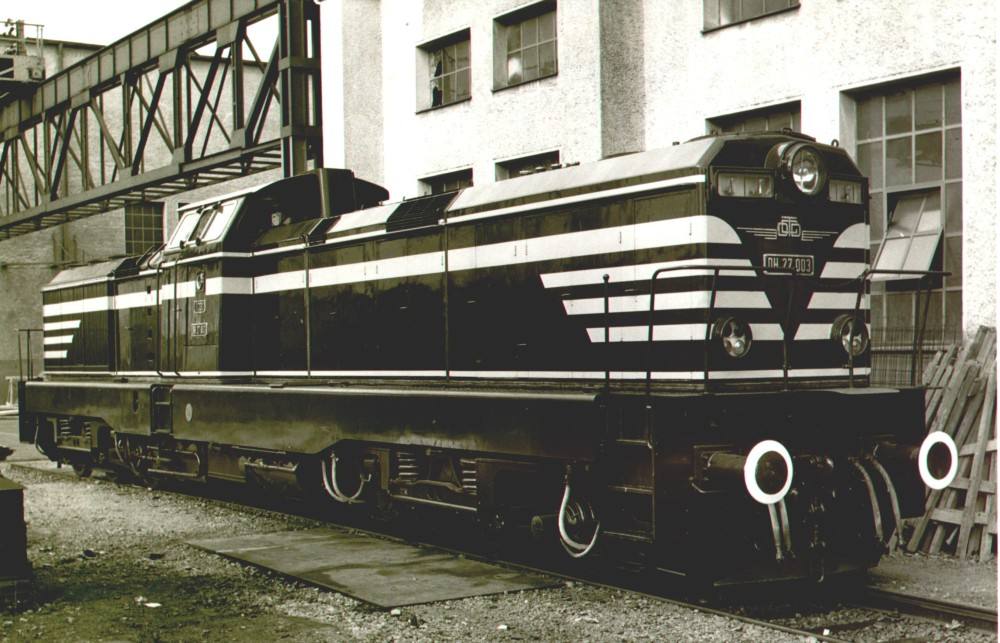
- TCDD DH27003
Type and origin
- Power type: Diesel-hydraulic
- Builder: Krauss-Maffei
- Build date: 1961
- Total produced: 3
Specifications
- Configuration
  - UIC: C′C′
- Gauge: 1,435 mm (4 ft 8 1/2 in)
Career
- Operators: Turkish State Railways
- Numbers: DH27001 – DH27003

DH27000 was a series of three diesel-hydraulic locomotives bought by the Turkish State Railways from Krauss-Maffei in 1960 as a possible alternative to the American DE21500. Though performance was good, TCDD chose to buy the General Electric models, possibly due to better financing model for the latter.

== Background ==
In response to the 1955 visit to Yugoslavia, Greece and Turkey by one of the V200 prototypes, Turkish Railways - TCDD - ordered three Krauss-Maffei ML 2700 locomotives in 1960. As with the Yugoslavian ML2200 locomotives the Turkish locomotives had six axles, however the design was a departure from the V200 carbody style with the final product looking more like contemporary US road switcher locomotives with a European twist. The locomotives were symmetrical in design with two long hoods covering the engines, transmissions and auxiliaries and a single raised driving cab separating the two hoods in the middle of the locomotive. Each locomotive had two Maybach MD655 engines rated at 1,350 hp/994 kW, each coupled to a Voith L630rU transmission which was equipped for hydrodynamic braking. The locomotives were 19,670 mm long over buffers, weighed 111 tonnes in working order and were fitted with a Vapor train heating boiler manufactured by Hagenuk under licence. The maximum design speed of the locomotives was 100km/h. Krauss Maffei was asked to design the locomotives so that they could work effectively at high temperatures - up to 35°C - and at altitudes up to 800m above sea level. Before delivery the locomotives were tested over the severely curved and graded Schwarzwaldbahn between Offenburg and Villingen, hauling freight trains normally operated by V200 locomotives. The locomotives left the Krauss Maffei works in München on 9 October 1961 and made their way to Ankara, Turkey, under their own power. TCDD numbered the locomotives DH27 001 - DH27 003, the corresponding Krauss Maffei works numbers being 18 702 - 18 704. TCDD started testing and training crews on the locomotives in December 1961 with entry into regular service being achieved in 1962. The locomotives worked freight and passenger trains radiating from Ankara until TCDD retired them in 1982.
