= TCDD MT5600 =

- Manufacturer: Tüvasaş
- Constructed: 1990
- Number built: 11
- Formation: Railcar
- Fleet numbers: MT5601 – MT5611
- Capacity: 64 (also has standing in Turkish regional rail practice since tickets are sold classless and unnumbered)
- Operators: Turkish State Railways

Specifications
- Car length: 25,190 mm
- Width: 2,850 mm
- Height: 3,925 mm
- Floor height: 1,100 mm
- Platform height: 480 mm
- Entry: two steps, with possibility of level entry
- Doors: 1 per side
- Articulated sections: 1
- Maximum speed: 140 km/h alone or in pairs, 110km/h in triples, 85 km/h with trailer car
- Weight: 34.7 t (motor car)
- Prime mover(s): Cummins KTA 19 R
- Power output: 410 kW
- Transmission: Hydraulic, Voith T320rz
- Multiple working: Yes, can be coupled with an identical unit or MT5500, MT5700
- Track gauge: 1,435 mm (4 ft 8 1/2 in)

TCDD MT5600 branded as Sakarya is a series of 11 diesel railcars operated by the Turkish State Railways. They were produced by Tüvasaş.
