= TCDD MT5300 =

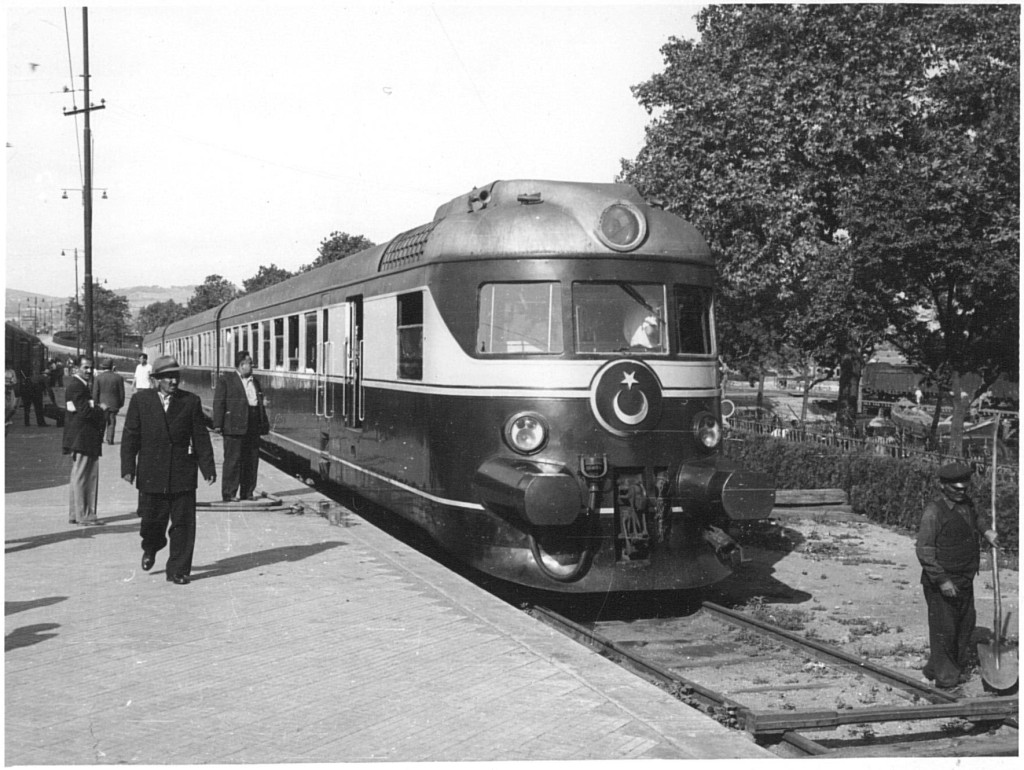
- MT5300 at Haydarpaşa
- Manufacturer: MAN, Duewag, Esslingen, Westwaggon
- Constructed: 1951–1952
- Entered service: 1951
- Number built: 16
- Formation: 3 cars
- Capacity: 120
- Operators: Turkish State Railways

Specifications
- Car length: 70.93 m (232 ft 9 in) (total)
- Width: 2,868 mm (9 ft 4.9 in)
- Maximum speed: 125 kilometres per hour (78 mph)
- Weight: 135 t (133 long tons; 149 short tons)
- Prime mover(s): MAN Diesel L12V 17,5/18
- Power output: 810 kW
- Track gauge: 1,435 mm (4 ft 8 1/2 in)

TCDD MT5300 was a series of diesel multiple units operated by the Turkish State Railways. The trains were used on intercity services, and offered higher speeds and comfort than steam powered trains. There had many similarities to the MT5200. The motor units were built by MAN, Esslingen and Duewag with MAN Diesel engines, while the centre cars were built by Westwaggon.
