= TCDD DH11500 =

DH11500
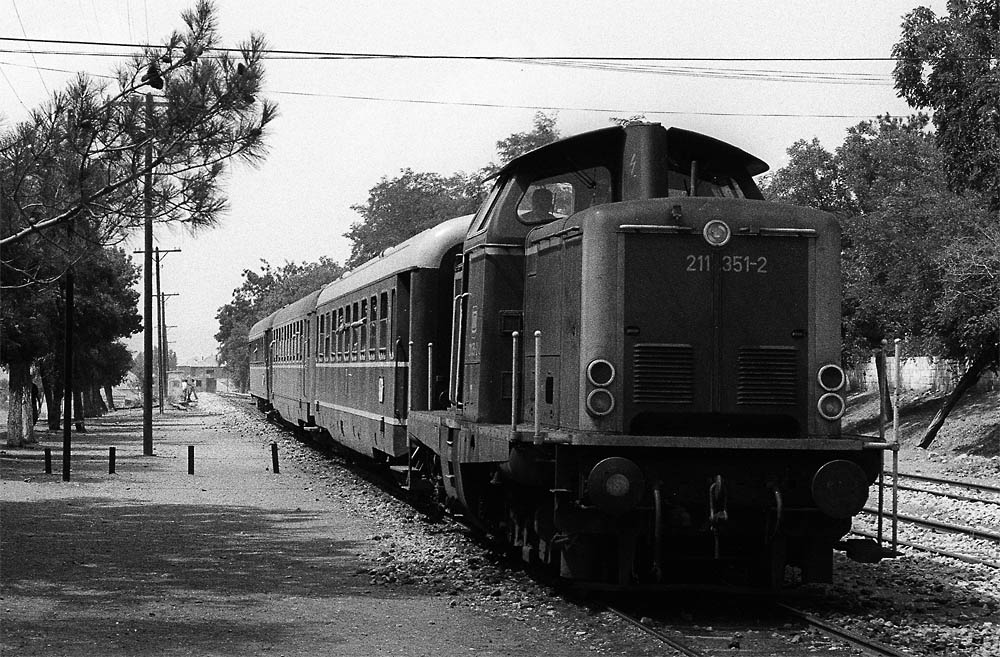
- TCDD DH11510
Type and origin
- Power type: Diesel-hydraulic
- Builder: Esslingen, Jung, Maschinenbau Kiel
- Build date: 1962–1963
- Total produced: 15
Specifications
- Configuration
  - AAR: B-B
  - UIC: B'B'
- Gauge: 1,435 mm (4 ft 8 1/2 in)
- Length: 12.10 m (39 ft 8 in)
- Loco weight: 68 tonnes (67 long tons; 75 short tons)
- Engine type: Daimler Benz MB820Bb
- Train brakes: Air, parking pawl
Performance figures
- Maximum speed: 80 km/h (50 mph)
- Power output: 810 kW (1,090 hp)
Career
- Operators: Turkish State Railways
- Numbers: DH11501 – DH11515

DH11500 was a series of 15 diesel-hydraulic shunter locomotive bought by the Turkish State Railways from Deutsche Bundesbahn in 1985. The units were all DB Class 211 built by Esslingen, Jung, and Maschinenbau Kiel in 1962 and 1963. TCDD originally rented the locomotives from Deutsche Bundesbahn's surplus stock for one year. The locomotives were transported to Turkey in October 1982, and were allocated to the Halkali and the Izmir-Halkapinar depots. Like in Germany, they were used for hauling light goods and passenger trains. Because of the heavy use and negligent maintenance most units has become inoperable in only a few years.
