= TCDD DH6500 =

DH6500
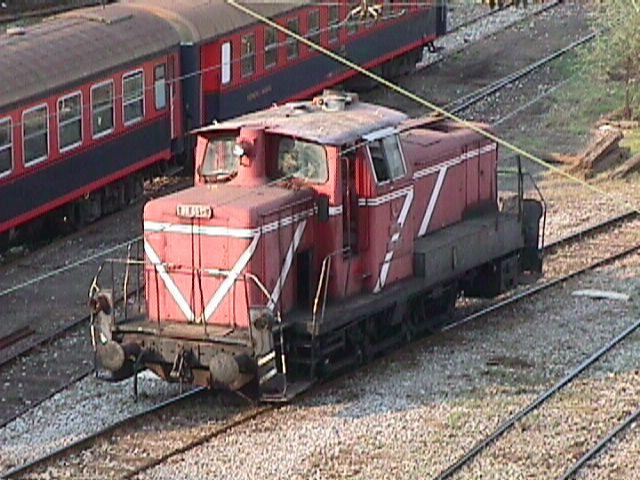
- DH6500 at Haydarpaşa
Type and origin
- Power type: Diesel-hydraulic
- Builder: Krupp-Esslingen
- Build date: 1960
- Total produced: 40
Specifications
- Configuration
  - UIC: C
- Gauge: 1,435 mm (4 ft 8 1/2 in)
- Length: 10.5 m (34 ft 5 in)
- Loco weight: 42.5 tonnes (41.8 long tons; 46.8 short tons)
- Engine type: Maybach GT6
Performance figures
- Maximum speed: 60 km/h (37 mph)
- Power output: 480 kW (644 hp)
Career
- Operators: Turkish State Railways
- Numbers: DH6501 – DH6540

TCDD DH6500 was a series of diesel-hydraulic shunter built for the Turkish State Railways. A total of 40 locomotives were built by Krupp-Esslingen after 1960, based closely on DB Class 360. They were equipped with Maybach GT6 engines.
