= TCDD DE20000 =

DE20000
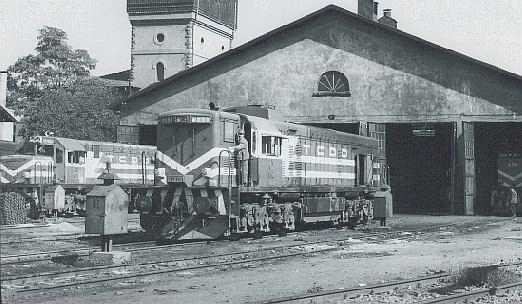
- DE 20002 in Ankara.
Type and origin
- Power type: Diesel-electric
- Builder: GE Transportation Systems, USA
- Model: GE U18C
- Build date: 1957–1958
- Total produced: 5
Specifications
- Configuration
  - UIC: Co'Co'
- Gauge: 1,435 mm (4 ft 8 1/2 in)
- Length: 16.4 m (53 ft 10 in)
- Loco weight: 102 tonnes (100 long tons; 112 short tons)
- Engine type: Cooper Bessemer FVBL 12T
- Cylinders: 12
Performance figures
- Power output: 1,320 kW (1,770 hp)
Career
- Operators: Turkish State Railways
- Numbers: DE20001 – DE20005

TCDD DE20000 were the first diesel-electric locomotive built for operations on Turkish State Railways. Five General Electric U18C units with Cooper Bessemer engines were built in 1957–58. All the locomotives are now retired from service.
