= TCDD DH6000 =

DH6000
Type and origin
- Power type: Diesel-hydraulic
- Builder: Jenbacher
- Build date: 1959
- Total produced: 1
Specifications
- Configuration
  - UIC: B
- Gauge: 1,435 mm (4 ft 8 1/2 in)
- Wheel diameter: 950 mm (3 ft 1 in)
- Length: 9,350 mm (30 ft 8.1 in)
- Loco weight: 48 tonnes (47 long tons; 53 short tons)
- Engine type: Jenbach JW600
Performance figures
- Maximum speed: 60 km/h (37 mph)
- Power output: 410 kW (550 hp)
- Tractive effort: 110 kN (25,000 lbf)
Career
- Operators: Turkish State Railways
- Numbers: DH6001

TCDD DH6000 was a single diesel-hydraulic shunter built for the Turkish State Railways by Jenbacher based on Jenbacher DH600C.
