= Samsun railway station =

Railway station in Samsun, Turkey

Samsun
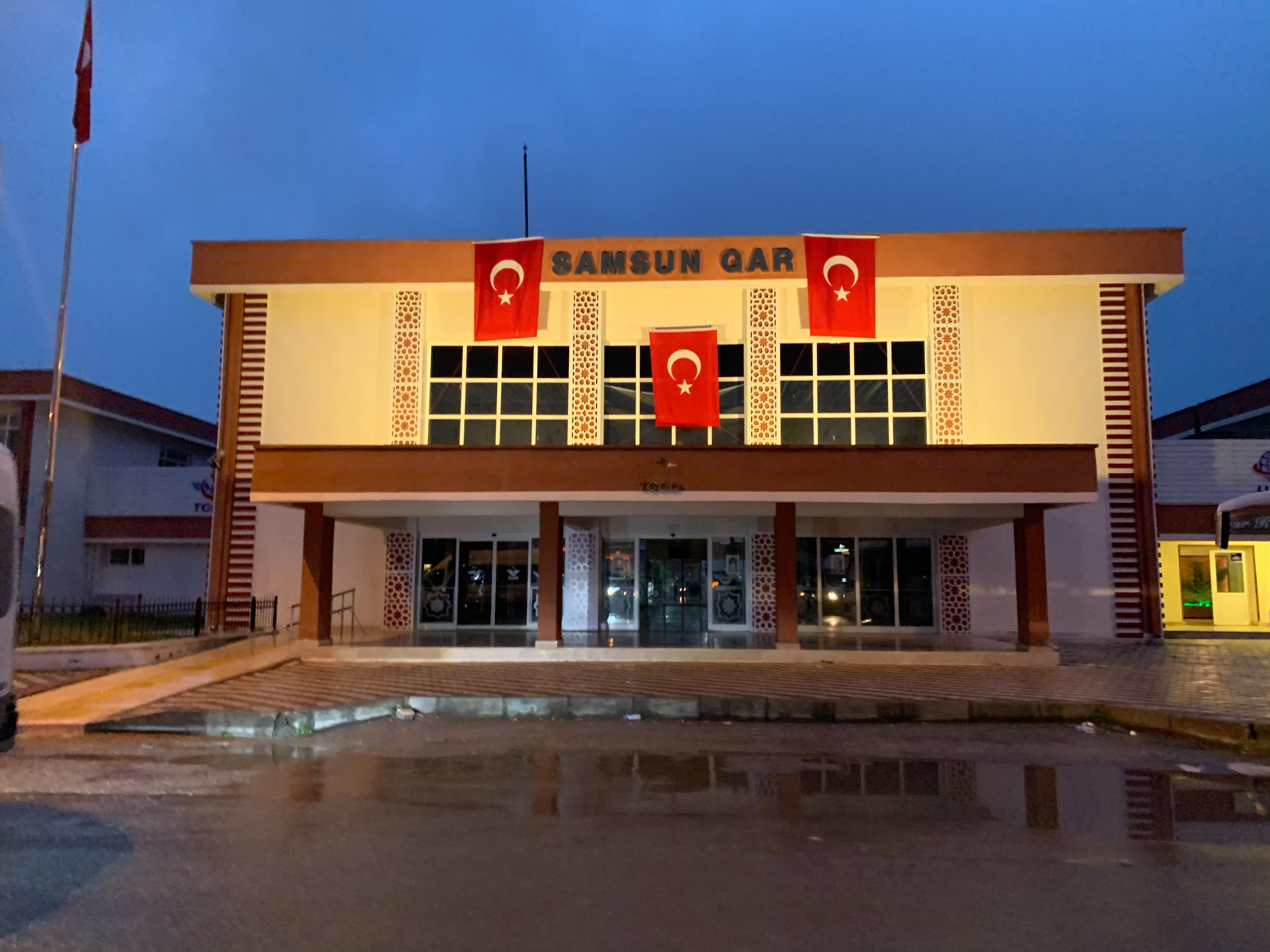
- view of the frontage of the station

General information
- Location: İstasyon Mahallesi, Fuar Caddesi, 55060 Ilkadim; Turkey
- Coordinates: 41°17′25″N 36°20′01″E
- System: TCDD intercity and regional rail station
- Owner: Turkish State Railways
- Line: Samsun–Kalin railway
- Platforms: 2 (1 side platform, 1 island platform
- Tracks: 3
- Connections: Samsun Tram

Construction
- Parking: Located in front of the building
- Architectural style: Turkish Neoclassical, Art Deco

History
- Opened: 1926
- Rebuilt: 2015
Location
- Location within Turkey

Samsun Station is the main at-grade train station belonging to Turkish State Railways, located in the İstasyon neighborhood of the İlkadım district of Samsun. The station was constructed in 1926 and renovated in 2015. It provides both passenger and freight service between Samsun, Sivas and Amasya.

== History ==
The station, located on the Samsun-Kalin Railways, was built by the State Railways and Ports Administration and entered service in 1926. It is now operated by Turkish State Railways and provides limited regional train service. Service between Samsun and Çarşamba via the Samsun–Çarşamba Railway started with the opening of the station in 1926 and ended in 1971. The station remains the most active in the Samsun region with air, bus, truck and personal vehicle travel now the dominant methods of transportation into Samsun Province.

== Service ==
The station serves the Samsun-Amasya Regional Trains operated by TCDD Tasimacilik. The station is connected to Samsun via roadway and public transit. There is a Samsun Tram stop located in front of the station. A freight ferry service operated by UPM and Turkish State Railways operates between Samsun and Kavkaz. Service to Ankara and Istanbul requires a transfer at Sivas.

== Future ==
Within the scope of the modernization project of the Samsun-Kalin railway, which started on September 29, 2015 and is Turkey's largest railway modernization investment, the infrastructure and superstructure of the station were renewed, and after 5 years of work, the station was put back into service with the official opening on November 1, 2020.

In 2019, Turkish State Railways made an announcement that high-speed rail service will be constructed between Ankara, Kırıkkale and Çorum. A new station will be built in the Canik district of Samsun to the south of State road D.010 near the regional İşgem facility. Construction of the new line and new Samsun station will entail the closure of this facility.
