= TCDD DH4100 =

DH4100
Type and origin
- Power type: Diesel-hydraulic
- Builder: Jenbacher
- Build date: 1960
- Total produced: 1
Specifications
- Configuration
  - UIC: B
- Gauge: 1,435 mm (4 ft 8 1/2 in)
- Wheel diameter: 950 mm (3 ft 1.4 in)
- Length: 9,280 mm (30 ft 5.4 in)
- Loco weight: 42 tonnes (41 long tons; 46 short tons)
- Engine type: Jenbach JW400
Performance figures
- Maximum speed: 60 km/h (37 mph)
- Power output: 275 kW (369 hp)
- Tractive effort: 70 kN (16,000 lbf)
Career
- Operators: Turkish State Railways
- Numbers: DH4101

TCDD DH4100 was a single diesel-hydraulic shunter built for the Turkish State Railways by Jenbacher based on Jenbacher DH400C.
