= TCDD DH44100 =

TCDD DH44100 series
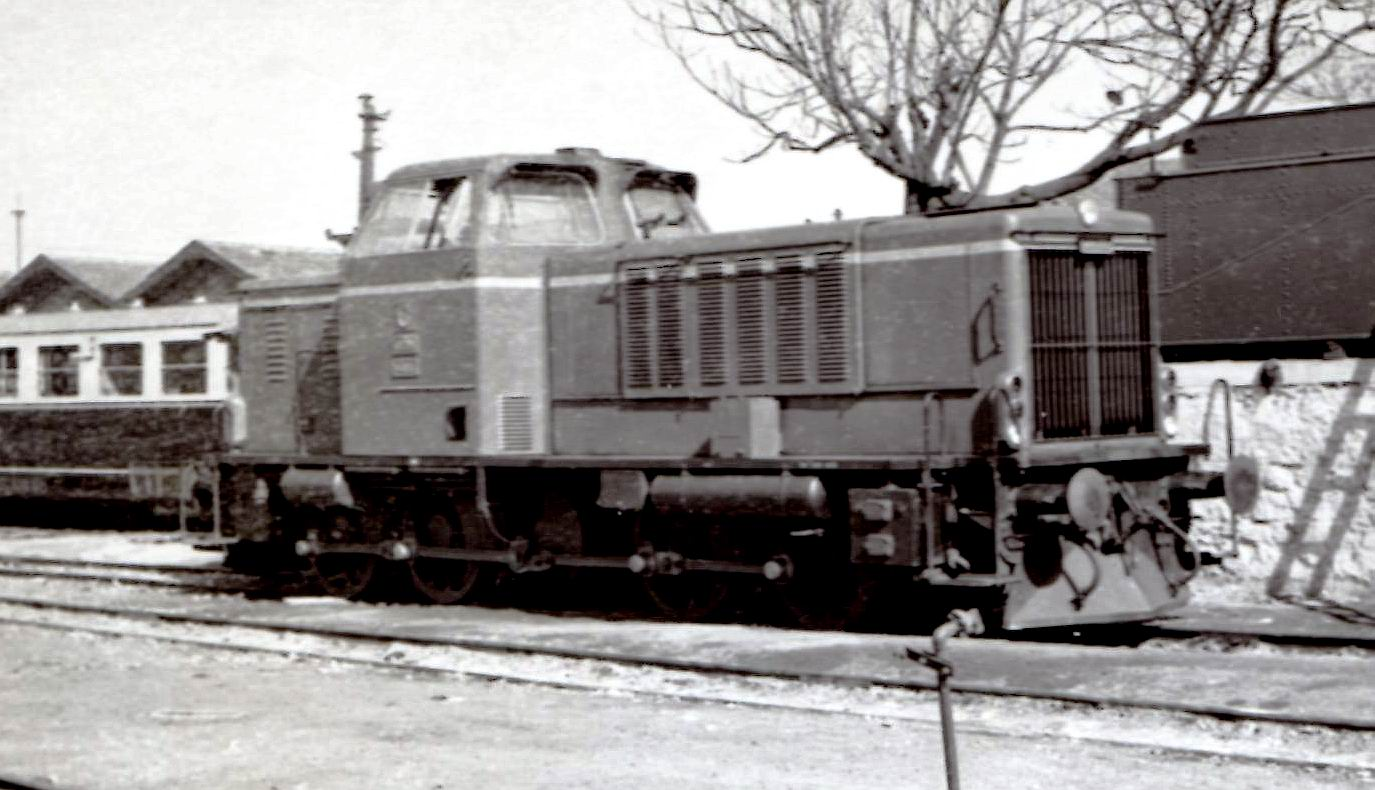
- TCDD DH44106 at Yedikule in Istanbul, April 1956
Type and origin
- Power type: Diesel-hydraulic
- Builder: Maschinenbau Kiel (MaK)
- Serial number: MaK 800029 – 800034
- Model: MaK 800 D
- Build date: 1955
- Total produced: 6
Specifications
- Configuration
  - Whyte: 0-8-0DH
  - UIC: D
- Gauge: 1,435 mm (4 ft 8 1/2 in)
- Minimum curve: 50 m (164 ft 1/2 in)
- Wheelbase: 5,800 mm (19 ft 3/8 in)
  - Drivers: 1,250 mm (4 ft 1 1/4 in)
- Length
  - Over buffers: 10,600 mm (34 ft 9 3/8 in)
- Width: 3,100 mm (10 ft 2 in)
- Loco weight: 54 tonnes (53 long tons; 60 short tons)
- Fuel capacity: 1,500 L (330 imp gal; 396 US gal)
- Prime mover: MA 301 A
- RPM
  - Maximum RPM: 750
- Transmission: Voith L37 zUb
Performance figures
- Power output: 800 PS (588 kW; 789 hp)
Career
- Operators: Turkish State Railways
- Numbers: DH44101 – DH44106

TCDD DH44100 was a series of six diesel-hydraulic shunters bought by the Turkish State Railways (TCDD) from Maschinenbau Kiel (MaK) in 1955. The units were very close to the DB Class V 65 used by Deutsche Bundesbahn. Likewise, they were a derivative of the original MaK 800 D design and the other MaK rod-coupled locomotives.

- Hertwig, Roland (2011). Die Baureihe V 65. Die vierachsige Stangen-Diesellok der DB und das 1. MaK-Typenprogramm [The V 65 series. The four-axle rod diesel locomotive of the DB and the 1st MaK type program] (in German). Freiburg: EK Verlag. ISBN 978-3-88255-121-1.
