= TCDD MT5400 =

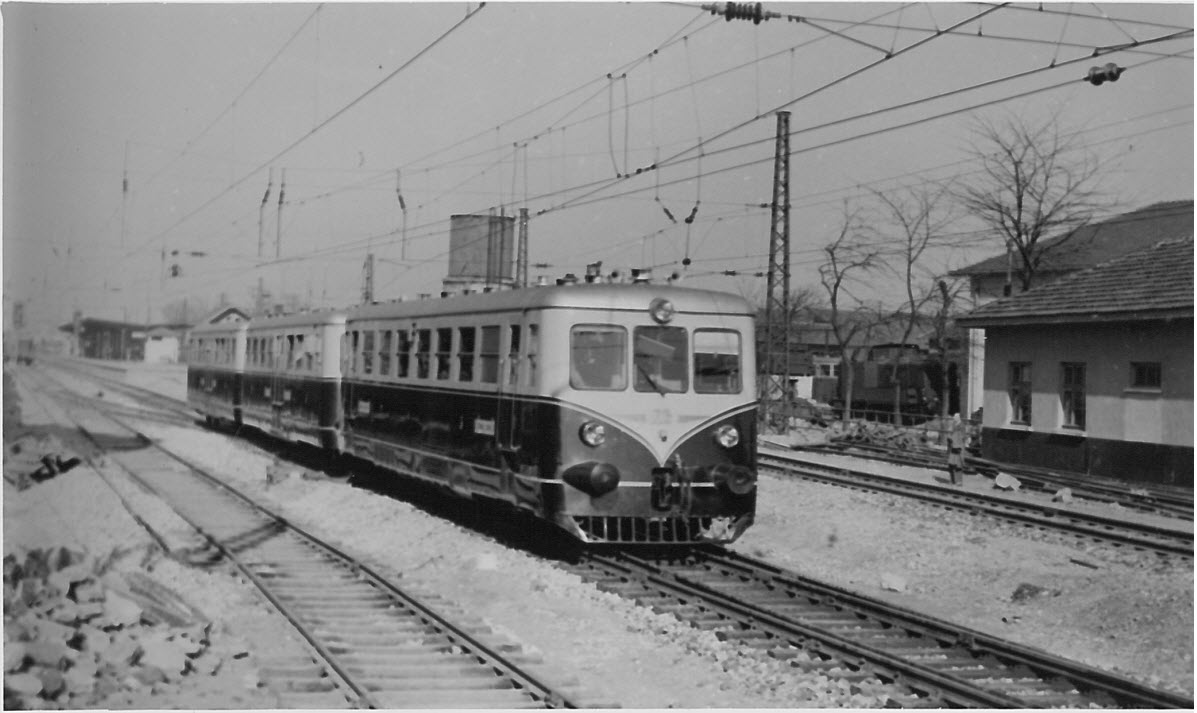
- An MT5400 railcar at Yedikule in Istanbul, 1956
- Manufacturer: SNCF
- Constructed: 1954–1955
- Number built: 20
- Formation: Railcar
- Fleet numbers: MT5401 – MT5420
- Operators: Turkish State Railways

Specifications
- Prime mover(s): MAN Diesel
- Power output: 254 kW
- Track gauge: 1,435 mm (4 ft 8 1/2 in)

TCDD MT5400 is a series of 20 diesel railcars operated by the Turkish State Railways. They were produced by SNCF in 1954–55. Also delivered were 30 trailers numbered MR401 through MR430.
