= TCDD DE21500 =

Turkish locomotives

DE21500
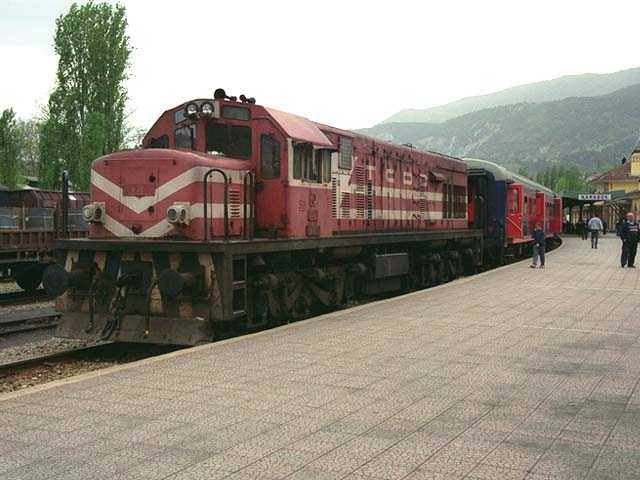
- DE 21506 at Karabük in 2000.
Type and origin
- Power type: Diesel-electric
- Builder: General Electric
- Model: GE U20C
- Build date: 1964–1965
- Total produced: 40
Specifications
- Configuration
  - AAR: C-C
  - UIC: Co'Co'
- Gauge: 1,435 mm (4 ft 8 1/2 in)
- Length: 17.2 m (56 ft 5 in)
- Loco weight: 112 tonnes (110 long tons; 123 short tons)
- Prime mover: GE FDL12
- Engine type: Four-stroke diesel
- Cylinders: 12
Performance figures
- Power output: 1,580 kW (2,120 hp)
Career
- Operators: Turkish State Railways
- Numbers: DE21501 – DE21540

TCDD DE21500 were diesel-electric locomotives built for operations on Turkish State Railways. Forty General Electric U20C units with GE engines were built in 1964–65. Most of the locomotives are retired from service. The locomotive was a part of the State Railways' dieselisation of its network and was the first mainline diesel locomotive. Most of them were retired in the early 2000s, with a few seeing service into the later half of the decade.
