= TCDD MT5700 =

Series of Turkish diesel railcars

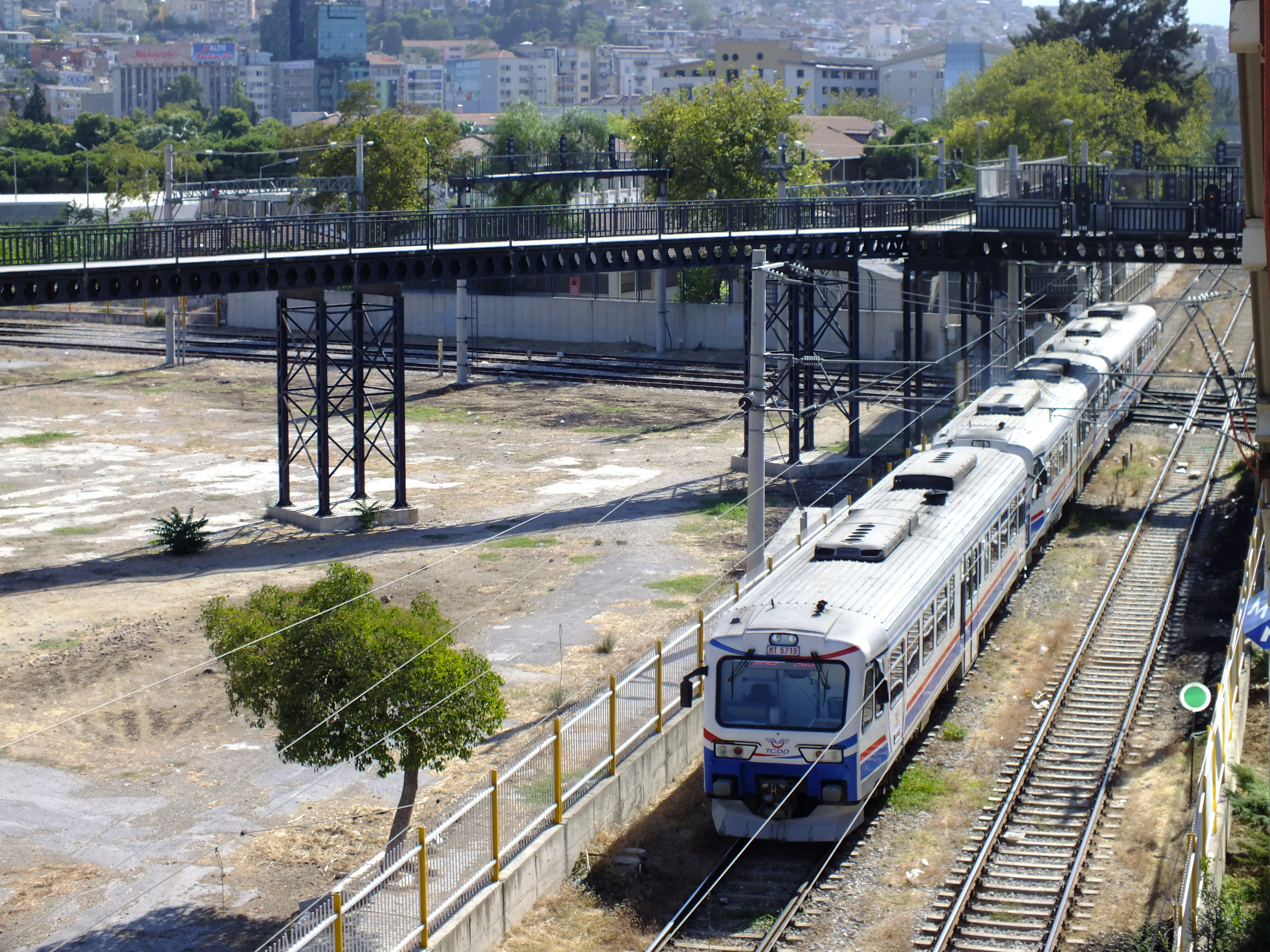
- MT5719 bringing up the rear of a regional service train to Ödemiş.
- Manufacturer: Fiat
- Replaced: steam-powered trains
- Constructed: 1993
- Entered service: 1994
- Number built: 30
- Number in service: 17
- Formation: B'B' single car
- Fleet numbers: MT5701 – MT5730
- Capacity: same as TCDD MT5600
- Operators: Turkish State Railways
- Depots: İzmir, Konya, Malatya

Specifications
- Car length: 24,190 millimetres (952 in)
- Floor height: 1100mm
- Platform height: 480mm
- Entry: two steps, with a possibility of level entry
- Doors: 1 each side
- Maximum speed: 140 km/h alone or in pairs, 120km/h in triples, 85km/h with a trailer car attached
- Weight: 57,300 kilograms (126,300 lb)
- Traction system: Diesel-hydraulic, one engine powers each bogie
- Prime mover(s): A pair of Fiat 8217 series
- Power output: 420 kilowatts (560 hp)
- Transmission: Voith T211r
- Acceleration: 0.7 metres per second squared (2.3 ft/s^{2})
- Deceleration: 1.3 metres per second squared (4.3 ft/s^{2})
- Braking system(s): Hydraulic and dynamic
- Safety system(s): Dead man's switch
- Multiple working: Yes, can be coupled with identical units or MT5500, MT5600
- Track gauge: 1,435 mm (4 ft 8 1/2 in)

TCDD MT5700 is a series of 30 diesel railcars operated by the Turkish State Railways. They were produced by Fiat of Italy and are closely related to the slightly older MT5600 and Italian railcar ALn 668. This railcar has a three-speed hydrodynamic automatic transmission.
