= EUROTEM =

Rolling stock manufacturer

Hyundai EURotem
- Type: Joint venture
- Industry: Rail transport
- Founded: 4 July 2006
- Founder: TÜVASAŞ (Turkish state owned company); Hyundai Rotem (South Korea)
- Headquarters: Istanbul, Turkey
- Number of locations: 1: Adapazarı (production plant)
- Key people: President: Mr. Gil-Young Chung
- Products: Light rail vehicles, EMU, DMU, high-speed trains, coaches
- Number of employees: 150
- Website: hyundai-eurotem.com

EUROTEM, alternatively Hyundai EURotem, is a joint enterprise between Hyundai Rotem of South Korea and TÜVASAŞ and ASAŞ of Turkey which was founded in 2006 and started production in December 2007.

The Hyundai EURotem factory in Adapazarı, Turkey, was built as the Hızlı Tren Fabrikası (High-Speed Train Factory) with the purpose of manufacturing the next generation of Turkey's high-speed trainsets.

== Product history ==
Hyundai EURotem has built 24 DMU units and 96 EMU units for the Turkish State Railways.

On January 30, 2009, the first 8 trains (each with 4 coaches) built by Hyundai EURotem for the Istanbul Metro entered service. Hyundai EURotem will build a total of 92 new wagons for the M2 line, at a total cost of $127 million. These trains are air-conditioned and equipped with LCD screens, as well as dynamic digital maps showing the location and direction of the train.

In 2008, Hyundai EURotem received an order for 440 EMU cars for the Marmaray project.

== See also ==
- High-speed rail in Turkey
- Istanbul Metro
- TÜVASAŞ
- Hyundai Rotem
- HSR-350x
- KTX-II
