= Samsun–Kalın railway =

Kalın–Samsun railway
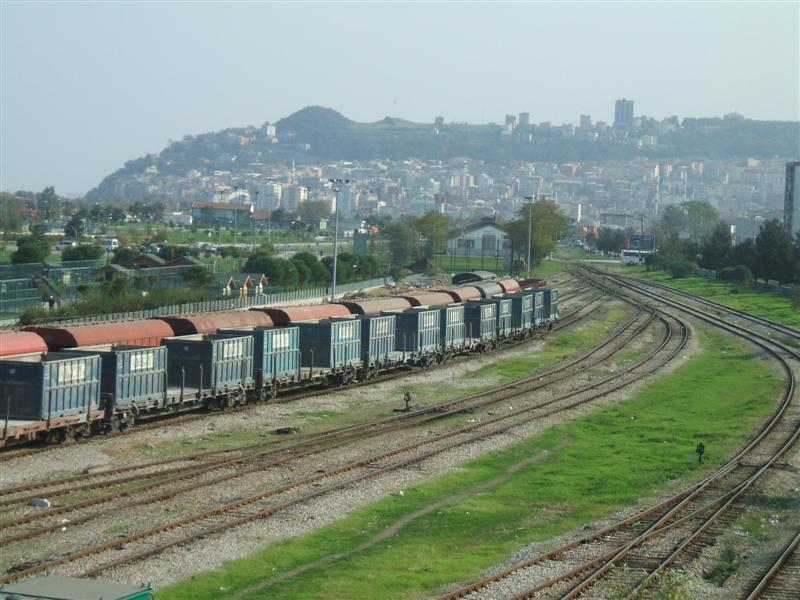
- The northern terminus of the railway, Samsun.

Overview
- Owner: Turkish State Railways
- Locale: Black Sea Region, Turkey
- Termini: Kalın, Sivas; Samsun, Samsun

Service
- Type: Heavy rail
- System: Turkish State Railways
- Operator(s): TCDD Taşımacılık

History
- Opened: 15 December 1932

Technical
- Line length: 377.7 km (234.7 mi)
- Number of tracks: 1
- Track gauge: 1,435 mm (4 ft 8 1/2 in) standard gauge

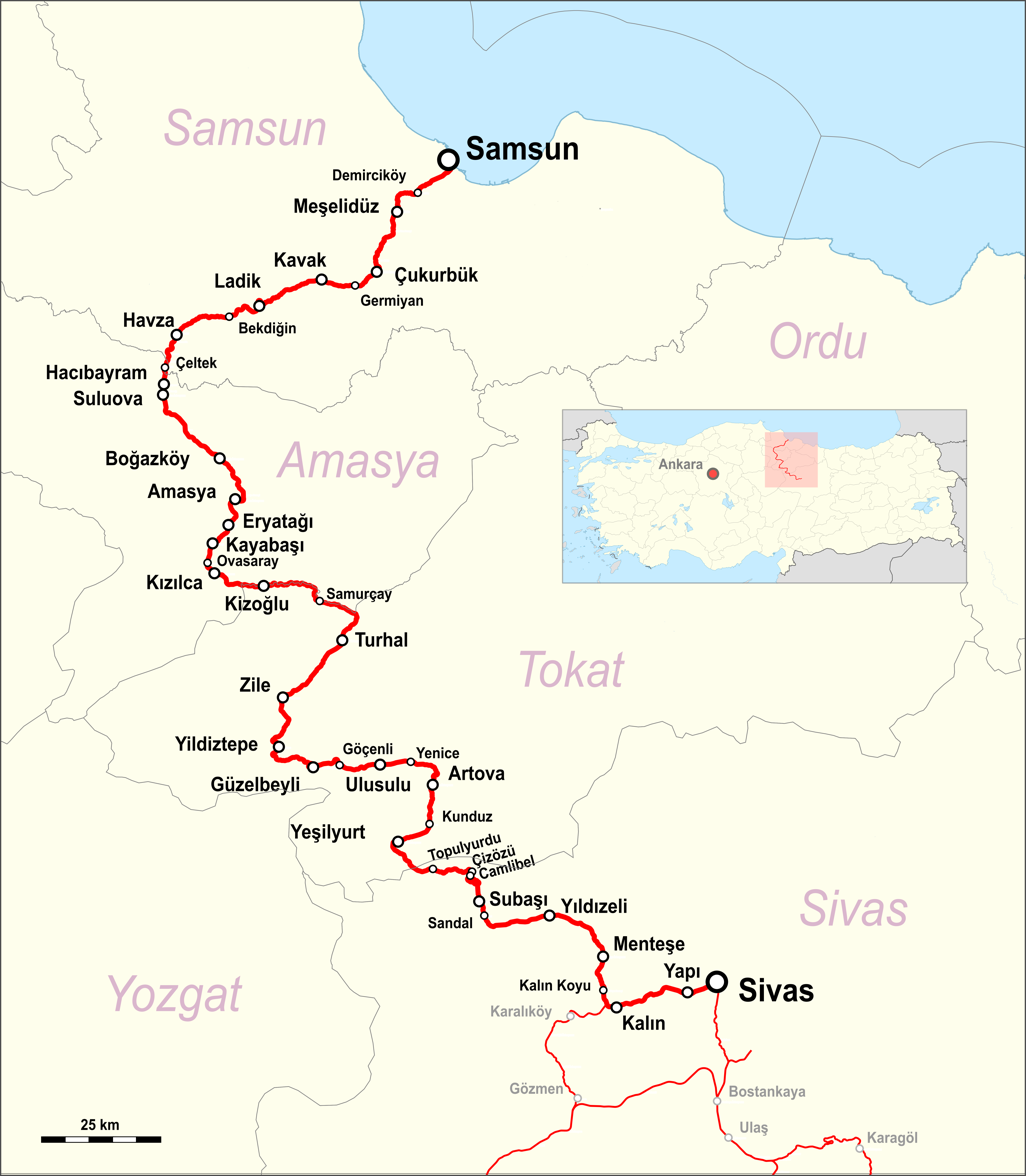
Sivas–Samsun railway

The Samsun–Kalın railway is a 377.7 km (234.7 mi) long railway in the Black Sea Region of Turkey. It connects to the Ankara–Kars railway, near Sivas from the port city of Samsun, running through the Pontic Mountains. It is one of two railways that service a Black Sea port, along with the Irmak–Zonguldak railway.

It was renovated in the early 21st century.
