= TÜVASAŞ =

Rolling stock manufacturer

Türkiye Vagon Sanayi Anonim Şirketi
- Type: Public
- Industry: Railcar manufacturing
- Founded: October 25, 1951 (as Vagon Tamir Atölyesi)
- Fate: Merged into TÜRASAŞ
- Successor: TÜRASAŞ
- Headquarters: Adapazarı, Turkey
- Area served: Turkey
- Key people: İbrahim Ertiryaki (Chairman)
- Number of employees: 1,142 (2010)
- Subsidiaries: EUROTEM
- Website: www.tuvasas.com.tr

Turkish Wagon Industry, Inc. (Turkish: Türkiye Vagon Sanayi Anonim Şirketi), more commonly known as TÜVASAŞ, was a Turkish railcar manufacturer based in Adapazarı. TÜVASAŞ was responsible for the construction, refurbishment and repair of railcars for the Turkish State Railways (TCDD), of which it was a 100% shareholder, reporting directly to the Turkish Ministry of Transport.

The company was founded in 1951 as Vagon Tamir Atölyesi (Wagon Repair Shop) to repair existing railcars of TCDD's fleet. TÜVASAŞ became the largest railcar manufacturer in the Middle East. The headquarters were in the Adapazarı Plant in Mithatpaşa, a neighborhood of Adapazarı.

TÜVASAŞ and two other rail companies (TÜLOMSAŞ and TÜDEMSAŞ) merged under the umbrella of one company, TÜRASAŞ.

== Products ==
The TVS2000 railcars were built by TÜVASAŞ and are their flagship railcar product. The first domestically produced electric trains, the TCDD E44000, are in operation since 2023.

== See also ==
- EUROTEM
