= Rail transport in Turkey =

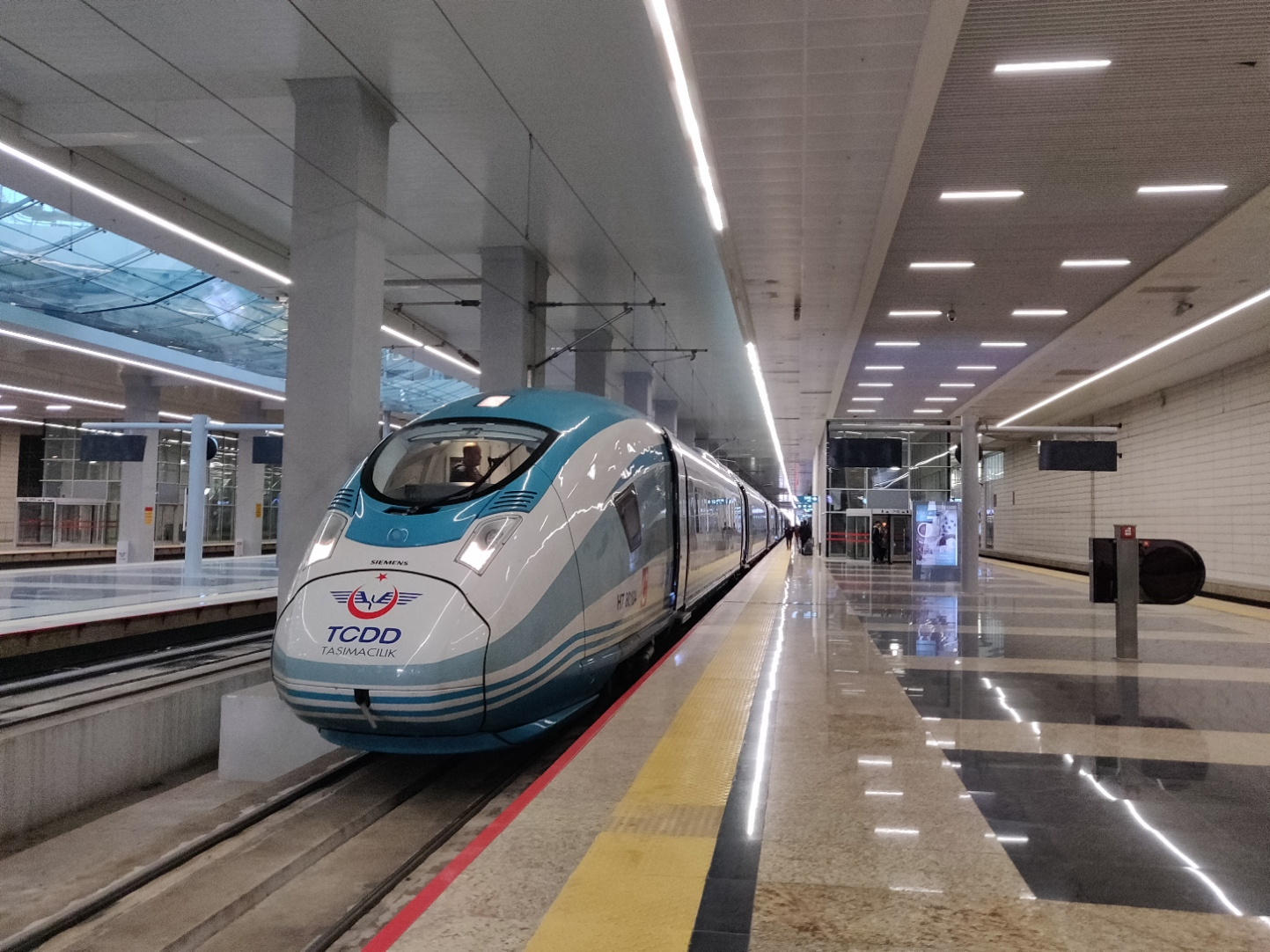
- TCDD's premier high-speed rail service, Yüksek Hızlı Tren, waiting to depart Ankara YHT.

Operation
- National railway: Turkish State Railways

Statistics
- Ridership: 279.4 million (2024)
- Passenger-distance: 15,43 billion (2024)
- Freight: 13,2 billion tkm (2024)

System length
- Total: 13,919 km (2024)
- Double track: 946 km (2024)
- Electrified: 7142 km (2024)

Track gauge
- Main: 1,435 mm / 4 ft 8 1/2 in standard gauge
- High-speed: 1,435 mm / 4 ft 8 1/2 in standard gauge

Electrification
- Main: 25 kV, 50 Hz AC

Features
- No. of tunnels: 804
- Tunnel length: 200.407 km

Turkey has a state-owned railway system built to standard gauge (1,435 mm (4 ft 8 1/2 in)) which falls under the remit of the Ministry of Transportation and Infrastructure. The primary rail carrier is the Türkiye Cumhuriyeti Devlet Demiryolları (TCDD) (Turkish State Railways) which is responsible for all long-distance and cross-border freight and passenger trains. A number of other companies operate suburban passenger trains in urban conurbations.

Native railway industry extends to the production of locomotives, passenger vehicles and freight wagons; some vehicles are also produced through licensing agreements and cooperation with foreign countries.

In the early 21st century, major infrastructural projects were realized; such as the construction of a high-speed railway network as well as a tunnel under the Bosphorus strait which connects Europe and Anatolia by rail for the first time.

Turkey is a member of the International Union of Railways (UIC). The UIC Country Code for Turkey is 75.

All high-speed and main rail lines use standard-gauge railway with the exception of the Bursa and Istanbul nostalgic tramways, which use the metre-gauge railway.

== History ==
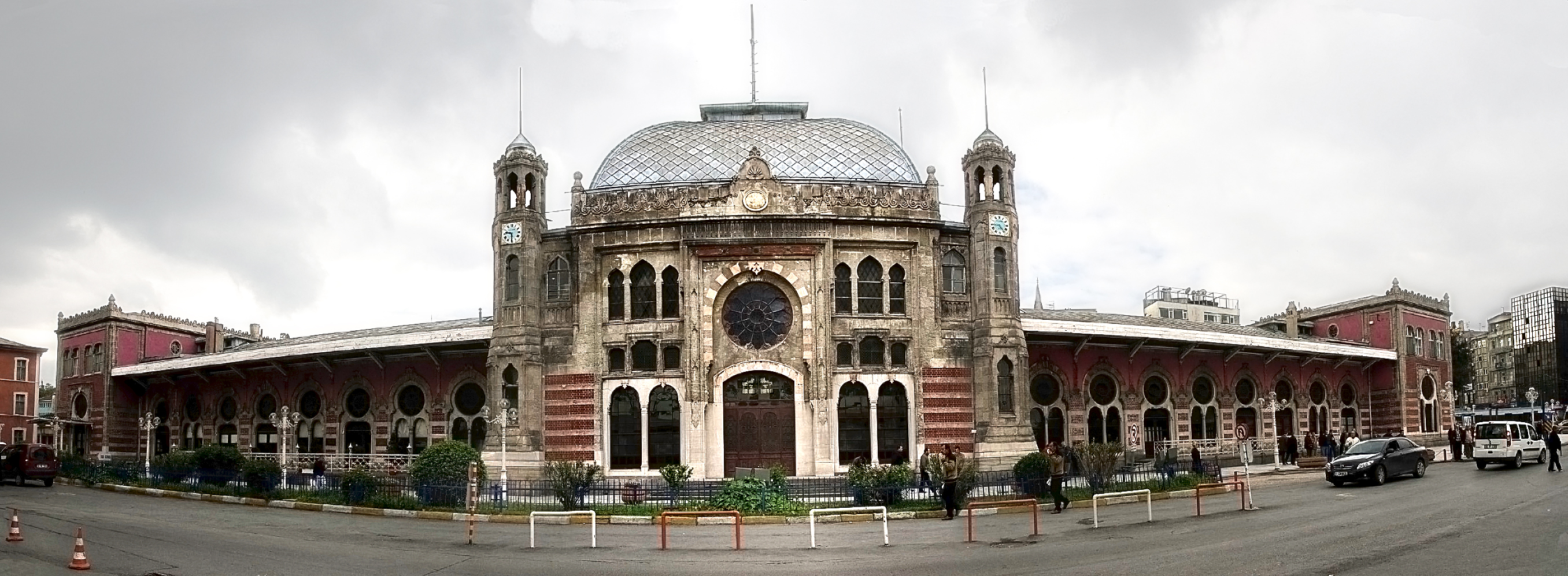
Istanbul Sirkeci Terminal opened in 1890 as the terminus of the Ottoman Empire's principal European railway line, serving also the famous Orient Express

Rail transport in Turkey began in 1856 with the start of construction of the 130 kilometres (81 mi) İzmir–Aydın Railway.

The state corporation that manages the Turkish railway system, Turkish State Railways, subdivides the history into the Pre-Republic period (Ottoman period), the Republic period (which extends from 1923 to 1950) and the period after 1950. During the first period, railways were built and operated by foreign concerns with permission from the state. In the second, the state took over its own railways and expanded them in support of Turkish financial interests. In the third period, attention turned from rail travel to highways, and the expansion of railways dramatically slowed.

Construction of the first railway line in Turkey began in 1856, being constructed by a British company that had gained permission from the Ottoman Empire. Later, French and German companies also constructed lines – the motivation was not only economic, the region had a strategically important position as a trade route between Europe and Asia.

As with other countries, rapid expansion followed; by 1922 over 8,000 km (4,971 mi) of lines had been constructed in the Ottoman Empire. At the birth of the Republic of Turkey in 1923, there were 3,660 km (2,274 mi) of standard gauge lines, of which 1,378 km (856 mi) were state-owned; while the lines owned by foreign investors were eventually nationalized starting from 1927. The railways were considered an essential part of the state by the government of the Republic, and continued to expand with new railway projects – over 3,000 km (1,864 mi) of new tracks were built in Turkey between 1923 and 1940. Railways were constructed serving mines, agriculture, people and ports; at the same time more lines serving eastern Anatolia were built, in their part helping to tie Turkey together as a functioning state.

In the years following World War II, the emphasis in transportation shifted to asphalt road and highway construction; it was not until the end of the 20th century that railways returned to favour with major passenger infrastructure projects being initiated, and five thousand kilometres of new lines planned for construction.

The line from the Iranian border to Van and across Lake Van to Tatvan was funded by the Central Treaty Organisation, before the Iranian Revolution.

High speed lines were constructed in the 21st century. The first high speed train ran in 2009. from the capital Ankara to Eskişehir.

Turkish State Railways (TCDD) was split with the passenger and freight operations being part of a new company named TCDD Transport from 2017, with TCDD left as a track and infrastructure operator.

== Network ==
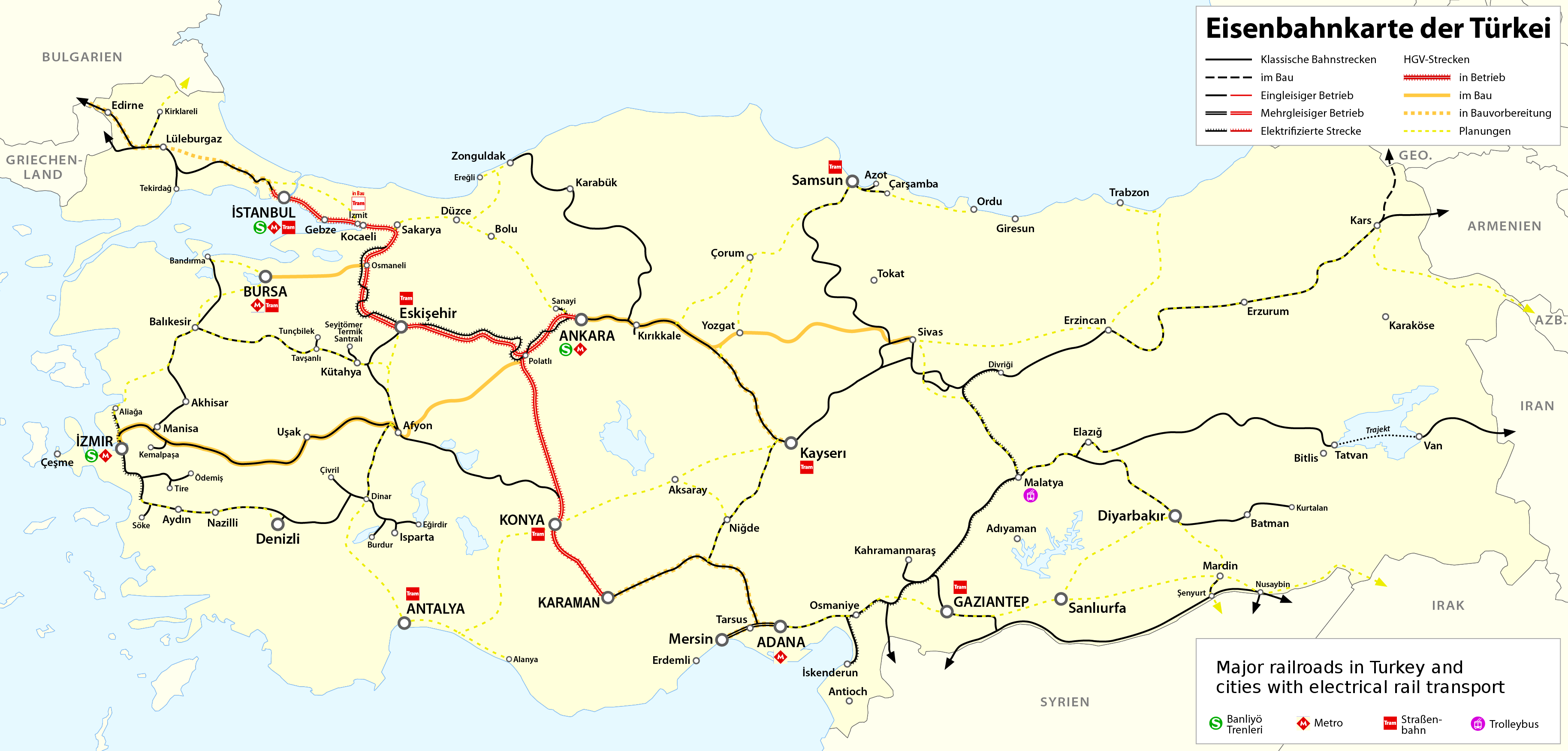
Rail transport map of Turkey

In 2022, Turkey had 12,532 km (7,787 mi) of railway lines, of which 95% were single-tracked, (Note: 8697km of lines) 21% of the network was electrified and 28% signalled. Due to the mountainous geography of the country, the network has many steep gradients and sharp curves. The Turkish rail network does not cover all major cities; its fourth and fifth largest metropolitan areas of Bursa and Antalya respectively remain unconnected to the network, although plans exist for high-speed rail lines to reach them.

As of June 2016, there is 8,334 km (5,179 mi) of conventional railway line and 593 km (368 mi) of high-speed railway line. 2,288 km (1,422 mi) of the network is electrified (31%), and 3,036 km (1,886 mi) of it is signaled (37%).

Electrified lines run from Kapıkule on the Bulgarian border via Istanbul to Ankara, and from Divriği via Malatya to İskenderun on the Mediterranean coast. Additionally, Sivas and İzmir have electrified networks. Here are some technical informations (standards) about the Turkish railway system:

- Rail Gauge – 1,435 mm (4 ft 8 1/2 in) standard gauge
- Electrification – 25 kV, 50 Hz AC Overhead lines
- Loading gauge – UIC GC
- Traffic – Right-Hand traffic
- Pantograph – 195 cm (77 in) (Old) and 160 cm (63 in) (New, Rebuilt and High-speed lines)
- Rail – S49 (Old) and UIC 60 (New, Rebuilt and High-speed lines)
- Sleepers – Wooden & Steel (Old) and Concrete (New, Rebuilt and High-speed lines)
- Fastening – Baseplate based with Screw spikes (Old) and Tension Clamp (New, Rebuilt and High-speed lines)
- Platform height – 38 cm (15 in) (Low platforms), 55 cm (21 5/8 in) (High-speed trains' platforms) and 105 cm (41 3/8 in) (Commuter rail platforms)
- Coupling – Buffers and Chains (Locomotives and Passenger cars) and Scharfenberg (MUs)
- Brake – Air
- Curve minimum – 200 m (656 ft) and 3,500 m (11,483 ft) (High-speed lines)

=== High-speed rail lines ===
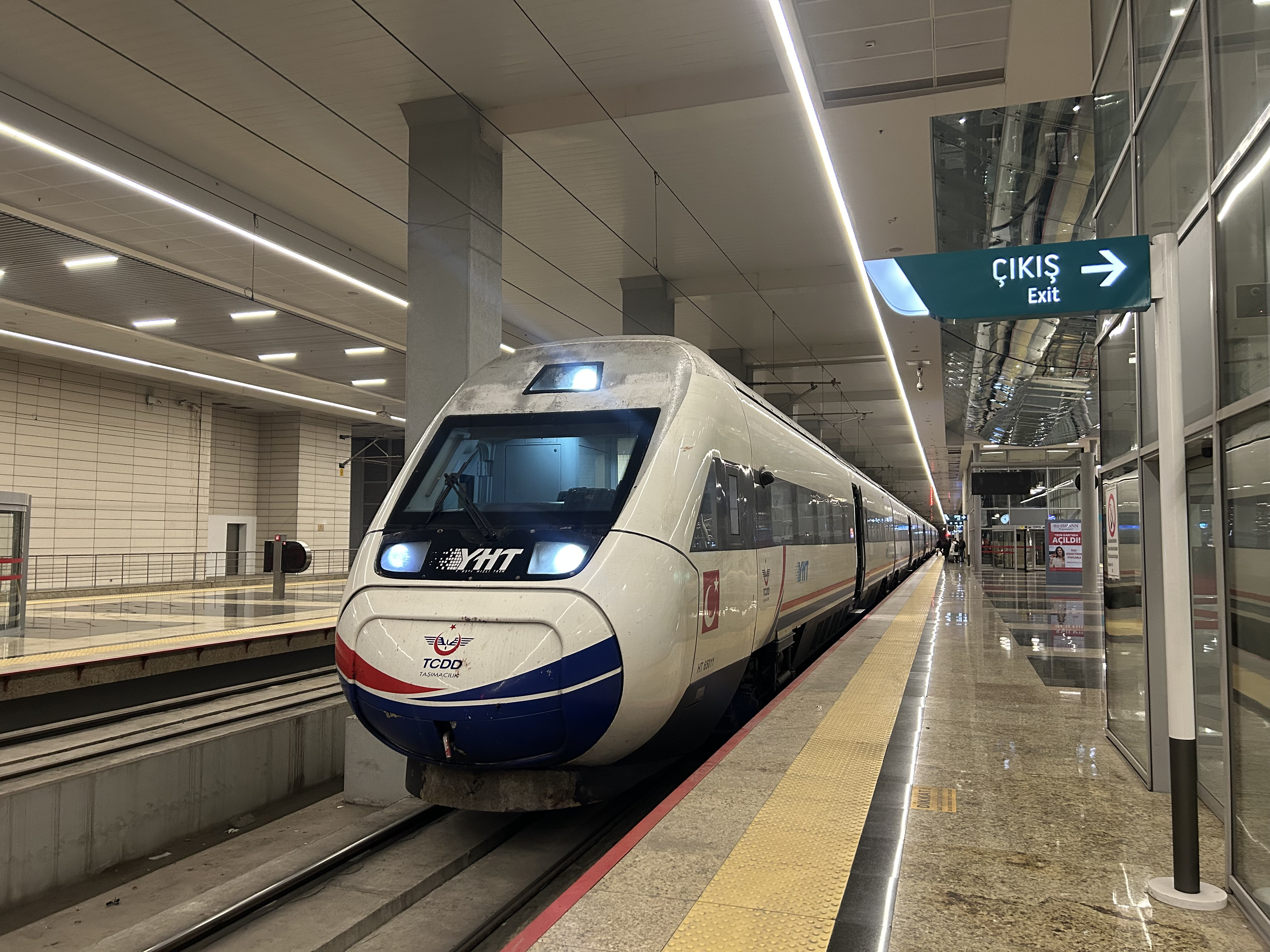
A TCDD HT80000 at the ATG terminal in Ankara.

The first completed section of the high-speed rail line between Ankara and Eskişehir was opened by the Prime Minister Recep Tayyip Erdoğan on 13 March 2009.

As of August 2024, there are eight high-speed routes (Istanbul-Ankara, Istanbul-Konya, Istanbul-Karaman, Istanbul-Sivas Ankara-Eskisehir, Ankara-Konya, Ankara-Karaman, Ankara-Sivas) running on three different high-speed railway lines. Bursa, İzmir and Edirne are among some of other cities to be connected to the high-speed network with works being underway. Bursa will be connected to the Ankara-Istanbul high-speed railway, a new line is currently being constructed from Polatlı to İzmir via Afyon is under construction along with some other lines from Yerköy (on the line from Ankara to Sivas) to Kayseri and another one from Halkalı to Edirne on Turkey's European border with Bulgaria.

Among the trains used by the Turkhish high speed rail services are Siemens Velaro TR, the same models used in InterCity Express (ICE) trains in Germany. The Turkish also use the Spanish CAF made TCDD HT65000. In 2025, the high speed network transported 100 million passengers annually.

=== Passenger transport ===
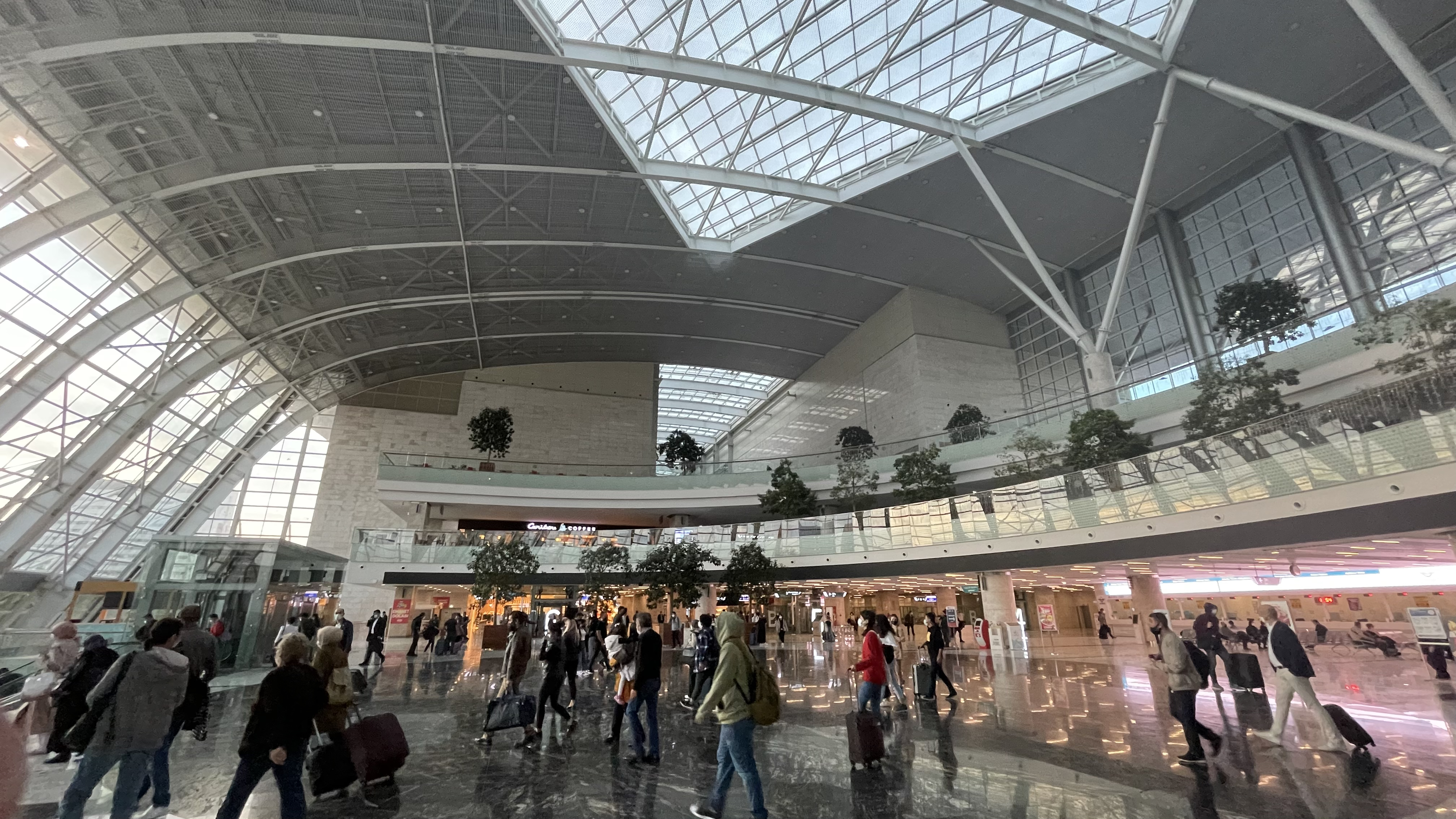
The ATG terminal in Ankara is a hub for the YHT services of the Turkish State Railways

In addition to high speed lines, there are several regular trains for passenger transportation. Almost all the network is covered by these passenger trains, which are mostly departing every day. In addition to high speed trains, there are several types of wagons being used for railway transport like pullmans, sleeping cars, couchette, DMU and EMU sets. In 2019, 164.7 million passengers used the Turkish rail network.

As of May 2016, there are several construction points (mainly for signalization or electrification) in Turkish rail network which is causing complete or partial closures.

=== Railway links with adjacent countries ===
==== West neighboring countries ====
- Bulgaria – open – 1,435 mm (4 ft 8 1/2 in) – 25 kV, 50 Hz AC
- Greece – open – 1,435 mm (4 ft 8 1/2 in) – 25 kV, 50 Hz AC (but no trains running since February 2011 due to economic crisis in Greece)

==== East neighboring countries ====
- (Georgia (country)) Georgia – open – break-of-gauge 1,435 mm (4 ft 8 1/2 in)/1,520 mm (4 ft 11 27/32 in) at Akhalkalaki (Georgia)
- Armenia – closed – break-of-gauge 1,435 mm (4 ft 8 1/2 in)/1,520 mm (4 ft 11 27/32 in) (see the Kars-Gyumri-Tbilisi railway line)
- Azerbaijan – no direct link – break-of-gauge 1,435 mm (4 ft 8 1/2 in)/1,520 mm (4 ft 11 27/32 in) via Georgia (see the Kars-Gyumri-Tbilisi railway line), via Iran (toward Nakhchivan Autonomous Republic).
- Iran – via Lake Van train ferry – 1,435 mm (4 ft 8 1/2 in)

The Iranian rail network is connected to the Turkish rail network via the Lake Van train ferry close to the border – which creates a serious bottleneck. (Note: Not only do trains need to be split for ferry transport, but the 91km water journey takes 5 hours. (See Economic and social commissioner for Asia and the Pacific: Development of the Trans-Asian Railway in the southern corridor of Asia-Europe routes United Nations, page 42, Peter Hodgkinson www.unescap.org) In 2007 an agreement was made to create a rail link between the two countries.

For the Caucasus region and Central Asia via Georgia and Azerbaijan, the Kars–Tbilisi–Baku railway) was finally opened in 2017, involving a break of gauge from 1,435 mm (4 ft 8 1/2 in) to 1,520 mm (4 ft 11 27/32 in). The line has a target of transporting 17 million tons of cargo per year. This railway by-passes the Kars–Gyumri–Tbilisi railway line that connected Turkey to Armenia but was closed in 1993 during the First Nagorno-Karabakh War; in 2009 the possibility of re-opening the line was stated by the Armenian transport minister.

==== South neighboring countries ====
- Iraq – no direct link, traffic routed via Syria – 1,435 mm (4 ft 8 1/2 in)
- Syria – closed because of the Syrian civil war – 1,435 mm (4 ft 8 1/2 in)

Trains to Iraq must be routed via Syria; the section of the tracks within Syria, between the Turkish and Iraqi borders is 81 km long. From 5 March 2012 due to the civil war in Syria, all rail services from Turkey to Syria were stopped; as a consequence freight going from Turkey to Iraq was routed to Nusaybin in southeast Turkey, from where it was transported to Iraq by truck.

== Planned expansion ==
Turkey is planning to construct a high speed line between Ankara and Samsun by 2030. Kırıkkale will be a stop between Ankara and Sivas. By 2026 a high speed line is set to be opened between Ankara and Kayseri. Another line is under construction from Ankara to İzmir on the Aegean coast. Turkey is planning to build a high speed rail line from Istanbul to Edirne as well as to Kapıkule which is on the Bulgarian border and will thus allow Turkey to establish a high speed line with Bulgaria. By 2030 a high speed line is planned between Istanbul and Ankara. A link to Kars to Nakhchivan in Azerbaijan via Iğdır is under construction.

=== Formerly planned railways ===
In 1948, the State Railways released a plan of railway lines that were to be constructed to "ensure national progression and safety". The plan included 5,538 km (3,441 mi) of new railway lines of which only 96 km (60 mi) were actually completed; the Gaziantep-Karkamış section of the Narlı-Nusaybin railway was completed in 1960.

== Urban rail ==
=== Commuter ===
Suburban systems in Turkey as listed below:

City	System	Operator	Electrification	Gauge	Bidirectional traffic	Notes
Istanbul	Marmaray	TCDD Taşımacılık A.Ş.	25 kV, 50 Hz AC Overhead line	1,435 mm (4 ft 8 1/2 in) standard gauge	Right-hand traffic	
Istanbul	Halkalı-Bahçeşehir Rail System	TCDD Taşımacılık A.Ş.	25 kV, 50 Hz AC Overhead line	1,435 mm (4 ft 8 1/2 in) standard gauge	Right-hand traffic	
Ankara	Başkentray	TCDD Taşımacılık A.Ş.	25 kV, 50 Hz AC Overhead line	1,435 mm (4 ft 8 1/2 in) standard gauge	Right-hand traffic	
İzmir	İZBAN	İZBAN A.Ş.	25 kV, 50 Hz AC Overhead line	1,435 mm (4 ft 8 1/2 in) standard gauge	Right-hand traffic	
Gaziantep	Gaziray	TCDD Taşımacılık A.Ş.	25 kV, 50 Hz AC Overhead line	1,435 mm (4 ft 8 1/2 in) standard gauge	Right-hand traffic	
Sakarya	Adaray	TCDD Taşımacılık A.Ş.	25 kV, 50 Hz AC Overhead line	1,435 mm (4 ft 8 1/2 in) standard gauge	Right-hand traffic	
Konya	Konyaray	TCDD Taşımacılık A.Ş.	25 kV, 50 Hz AC Overhead line	1,435 mm (4 ft 8 1/2 in) standard gauge	Right-hand traffic	Tender phase
Afyon	Afray	TCDD Taşımacılık A.Ş.	25 kV, 50 Hz AC Overhead line	1,435 mm (4 ft 8 1/2 in) standard gauge	Right-hand traffic	Planning phase
Kayseri	İncesu-Gömeç Rail System	TCDD Taşımacılık A.Ş.	25 kV, 50 Hz AC Overhead line	1,435 mm (4 ft 8 1/2 in) standard gauge	Right-hand traffic	On Hold (Awaiting rolling stock allocation by TCDD)

=== Metro ===
Five cities in Turkey have Metro system, listed as follows:

City	System	Electrification	Conductor system	Gauge	Bidirectional traffic	Opened
Istanbul	Istanbul Metro	750 V DC & 1,500 V DC	Third rail & Overhead line	1,435 mm (4 ft 8 1/2 in) standard gauge	Right-hand traffic	3 September 1989
Ankara	Ankara Metro	750 V DC	Third rail	1,435 mm (4 ft 8 1/2 in) standard gauge	Right-hand traffic	20 August 1996
İzmir	İzmir Metro	750 V DC	Third rail	1,435 mm (4 ft 8 1/2 in) standard gauge	Right-hand traffic	22 April 2000
Bursa	Bursaray	1,500 V DC	Overhead line	1,435 mm (4 ft 8 1/2 in) standard gauge	Right-hand traffic	24 April 2002
Adana	Adana Metro	750 V DC	Overhead line	1,435 mm (4 ft 8 1/2 in) standard gauge	Right-hand traffic	14 May 2010
Konya	Konya Metro	750 V DC ??	Overhead line ??	1,435 mm (4 ft 8 1/2 in) standard gauge	Right-hand traffic	Under construction
Gebze	Gebze Metro	750 V DC ??	Overhead line ??	1,435 mm (4 ft 8 1/2 in) standard gauge	Right-hand traffic	Under construction
Mersin	Mersin Metro	750 V DC ??	Overhead line ??	1,435 mm (4 ft 8 1/2 in) standard gauge	Right-hand traffic	Under construction

Metro systems are under construction in Konya and Gebze. Tram and light rail systems are operational in Antalya, Gaziantep, and Kayseri

=== Tram & Light Rail ===
There are also several tram and light rail systems in many cities, listed as follows:

City	System	Electrification	Gauge	Bidirectional traffic	Opened
Istanbul	Istanbul Tram	750 V DC Overhead line	1,435 mm (4 ft 8 1/2 in) standard gauge	Right-hand traffic	13 June 1992
İzmir	İzmir Tram	750 V DC Overhead line	1,435 mm (4 ft 8 1/2 in) standard gauge	Right-hand traffic	11 April 2017
İzmit	Akçaray	750 V DC Overhead line	1,435 mm (4 ft 8 1/2 in) standard gauge	Right-hand traffic	17 June 2017
Bursa	Burtram	750 V DC Overhead line	1,435 mm (4 ft 8 1/2 in) standard gauge	Right-hand traffic	13 October 2013
Antalya	AntRay	750 V DC Overhead line	1,435 mm (4 ft 8 1/2 in) standard gauge	Right-hand traffic	December 2009
Konya	Konya Tram	750 V DC Overhead line	1,435 mm (4 ft 8 1/2 in) standard gauge	Right-hand traffic	28 September 1992
Gaziantep	Gaziantep Tram	750 V DC Overhead line	1,435 mm (4 ft 8 1/2 in) standard gauge	Right-hand traffic	1 March 2011
Kayseri	Kayseray	750 V DC Overhead line	1,435 mm (4 ft 8 1/2 in) standard gauge	Right-hand traffic	1 August 2009
Samsun	Samsun Tram	750 V DC Overhead line	1,435 mm (4 ft 8 1/2 in) standard gauge	Right-hand traffic	10 October 2010
Trabzon	Trabzon Tram		Planned	Right-hand traffic	Under construction
Eskişehir	Estram	750 V DC Overhead line	1,000 mm (3 ft 3 3/8 in) metre gauge	Right-hand traffic	24 December 2004

=== Nostalgic tramway ===
City	System	Electrification	Conductor system	Gauge	Bidirectional traffic
Istanbul	Istanbul Tram	600 V DC	Overhead line	1,000 mm (3 ft 3 3/8 in) metre gauge	Partially
Bursa	Burtram	?	Overhead line	1,000 mm (3 ft 3 3/8 in) metre gauge	Partially
Antalya	Antalya Tram	600 V DC	Overhead line	1,435 mm (4 ft 8 1/2 in) standard gauge	Partially
Ankara	Ankara National Park Tram	?	?	1,000 mm (3 ft 3 3/8 in) metre gauge	No

== Companies ==
=== Turkish State Railways ===
In combination with its affiliates, the State Railways of the Republic of Turkey (Türkiye Cumhuriyeti Devlet Demiryolları, TCDD) have a monopoly on passenger (Note: Excluding urban mass transit systems, and tram networks.) and freight rail transportation, as well as the manufacturing of rolling stock and tracks. The organization was created in 1927 to operate the former railway lines of the Ottoman Empire that were left within the borders of the Republic of Turkey whose boundaries were defined with the Treaty of Lausanne in 1923. Additionally, major ports are also operated by the company.

=== Affiliated companies ===
Three affiliated companies of the TCDD produce rolling stock for the Turkish railway system under TÜRASAŞ:

- TÜLOMSAŞ (Türkiye Lokomotif ve Motor Sanayi A.Ş.) produces diesel and electric locomotives and related components; the company has produced locomotives under license from numerous companies over the years, including Krauss-Maffei, GM-EMD, Toshiba and Alstom.
- TÜVASAŞ (Türkiye Vagon Sanayi A.Ş.) manufactures coaching stock as well as diesel hydraulic railcars, and has a technology transfer agreement with Rotem of Korea to manufacture DMUs as well as a joint venture with Rotem, EUROTEM, to outfit and test high-speed train sets and suburban trains.
- TÜDEMSAŞ (Türkiye Demiryolu Makinaları Sanayii A.Ş.) produces and repairs freight wagons.

Another joint venture, Eurotem in Sakarya, also produces rolling stock for the railways.

== Statistical information ==
As of 2021, there were 10,546 km (6,553 mi) of main railway lines in Turkey, of which 14% are double-track and 51% are electrified.

In 2008, the most common rail weight is ~49 kg/m with 69% of track, the remainder being of lighter weight rail, except for 150 km of 60 kg/m rail. Similarly, 69% of sleepers are of the concrete type, with the remainder being wood (~19%) and steel (~12%). Over 700 tunnels exist, with a total length of 181 km; the majority (~76%) are under 1 km long and only one of them has a length of over 4 km. 1,316 steel bridges (average length 22 m) and over 10,000 concrete bridges (average length 2.9 m) exist, the majority (99%) are suitable for axle loads over 20 t, with 40% allowing axle loads of 22.5 tonnes.

Also in 2008, there were 64 electric locomotives and 549 diesel locomotives in Turkey, with availabilities of 81 and 84 percent, respectively. Additionally, 50 steam locomotives exist, of which 2 are kept in active order. In addition to the 83 EMUs and 44 DMUs for passenger transport, there were 995 coaches in Turkey (830 of which were in working order.) Over 17,000 wagons of various types make up the rest of the fleet.

== See also ==
- Çamlık Railway Museum
- TCDD Open Air Steam Locomotive Museum
- Istanbul Railway Museum
- Rahmi M. Koç Museum
- Rail transport in Turkey
- Ankara Suburban Railway
- Haydarpaşa Terminal
- High-speed rail in Turkey
- Istanbul-Damascus-Medina Railway
- Istanbul-Konya-Baghdad Railway
- Kars-Tbilisi-Baku railway
- List of railway stations in Turkey
- List of TCDD routes
- List of train accidents in Turkey
- Orient Express
- Sirkeci Terminal
