= History of rail transport in Turkey =

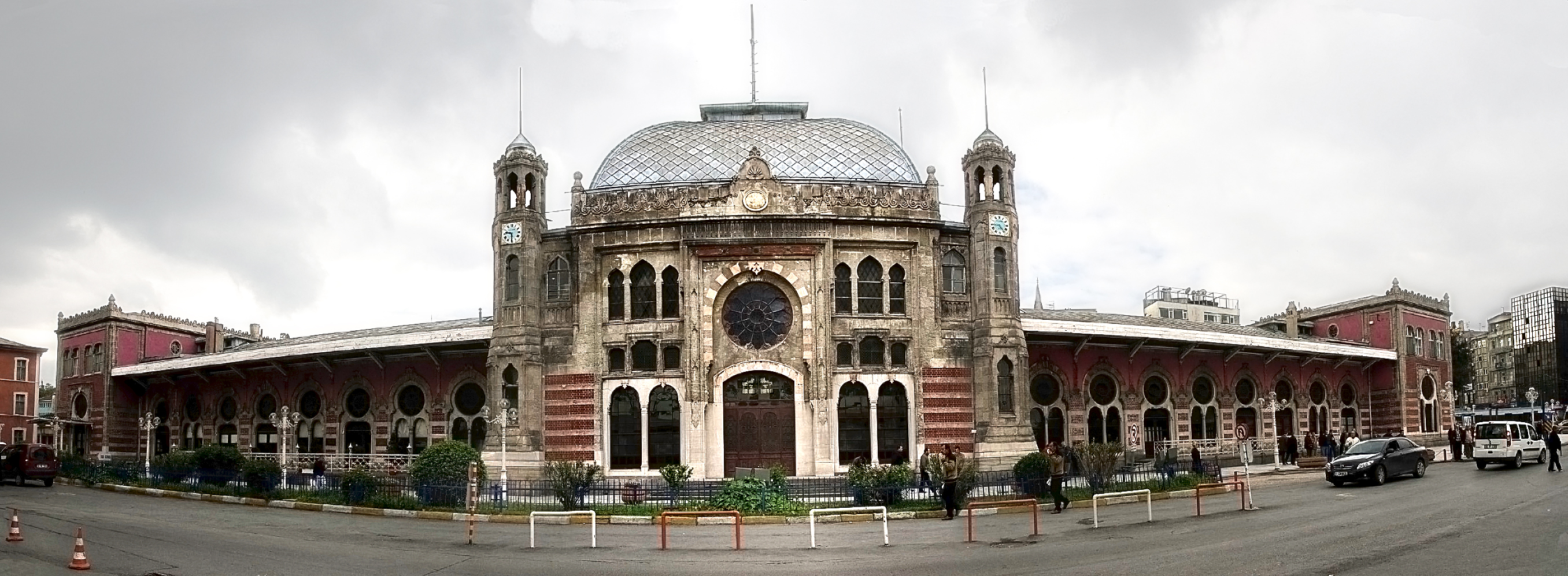
Istanbul Sirkeci Terminal opened in 1890 as the terminus of the Ottoman Empire's principal European railway line, serving also the famous Orient Express

Rail transport in Turkey began in 1856 with the start of construction of the 130 kilometres (81 mi) İzmir–Aydın Railway.

The state corporation that manages the Turkish railway system, Turkish State Railways, subdivides the history into the Pre-Republic period (Ottoman period), the Republic period (which extends from 1923 to 1950) and the period after 1950. During the first period, railways were built and operated by foreign concerns with permission from the state. In the second, the state took over its own railways and expanded them in support of Turkish financial interests. In the third period, attention turned from rail travel to highways, and the expansion of railways dramatically slowed.

Construction of the first railway line in Turkey began in 1856, being constructed by a British company that had gained permission from the Ottoman Empire. Later, French and German companies also constructed lines – the motivation was not only economic, the region had a strategically important position as a trade route between Europe and Asia.

As with other countries, rapid expansion followed; by 1922 over 8,000 km (4,971 mi) of lines had been constructed in the Ottoman Empire. (Note: In the Ottoman Empire: some parts of lines extending into the middle east would not be incorporated into the Turkish State on its creation) At the birth of the Republic of Turkey in 1923, there were 3,660 km (2,274 mi) of standard gauge lines, of which 1,378 km (856 mi) were state-owned; while the lines owned by foreign investors were eventually nationalized starting from 1927. The railways were considered an essential part of the state by the government of the Republic, and continued to expand with new railway projects – over 3,000 km (1,864 mi) of new tracks were built in Turkey between 1923 and 1940. Railways were constructed serving mines, agriculture, people and ports; at the same time more lines serving eastern Anatolia were built, in their part helping to tie Turkey together as a functioning state.

In the years following World War II, the emphasis in transportation shifted to asphalt road and highway construction; it was not until the end of the 20th century that railways returned to favour with major passenger infrastructure projects being initiated, and five thousand kilometres of new lines planned for construction.

The line from the Iranian border to Van and across Lake Van to Tatvan was funded by the Central Treaty Organisation, before the Iranian Revolution.

High speed lines were constructed in the 21st century. The first high speed train ran in 2009. from the capital Ankara to Eskişehir.

Turkish State Railways (TCDD) was split with the passenger and freight operations being part of a new company named TCDD Transport from 2017, with TCDD left as a track and infrastructure operator.

== Ottoman Empire period ==
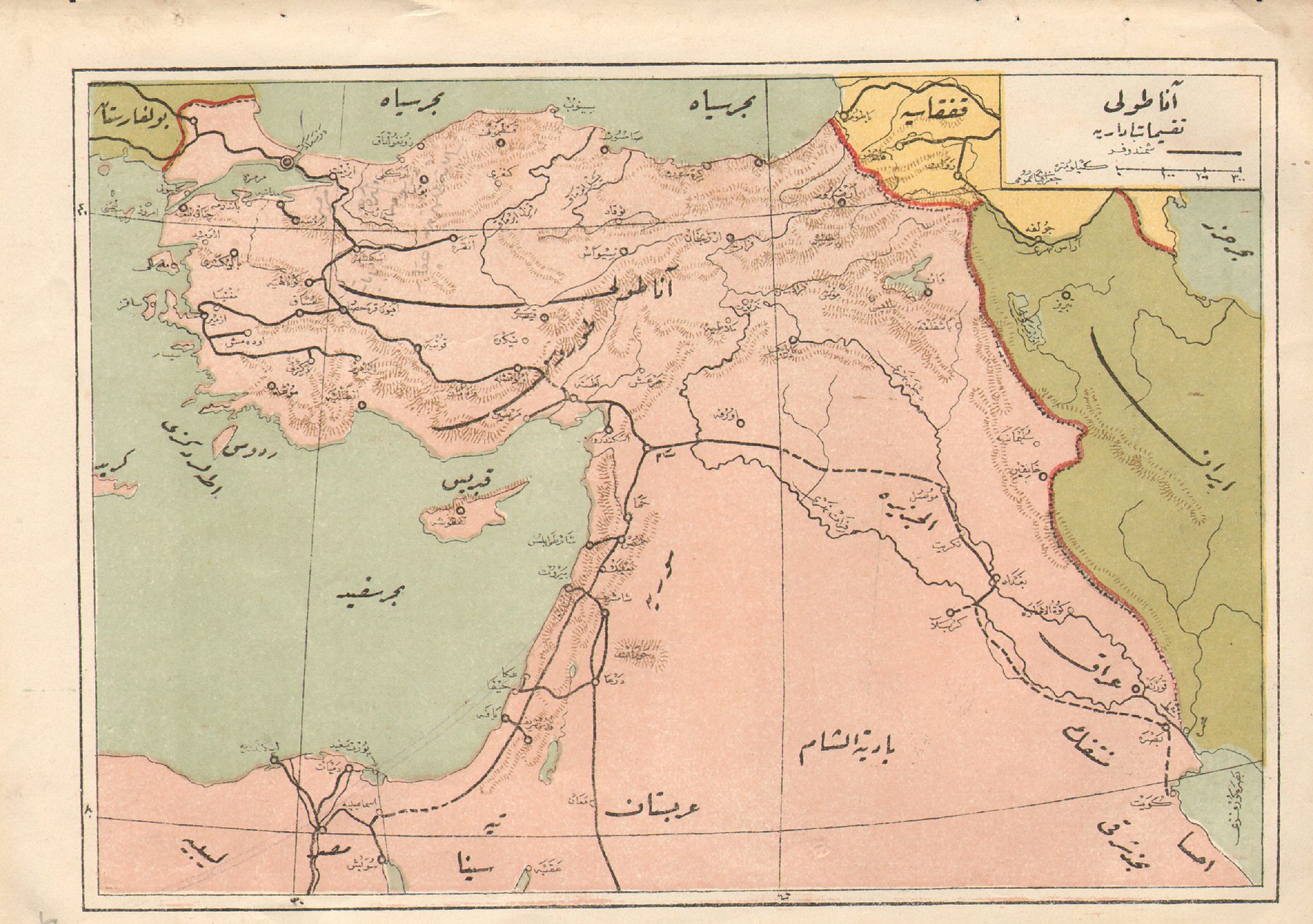
Map showing the Ottoman railways on the eve of World War I

=== Summary ===
The first finished Ottoman railway line was a 66 kilometres (41 mi) line between Köstence (today Constanţa, Romania) and Boğazköy (today Cernavodă, Romania) built in 1859–1860. The Ottoman Empire permitted British, French and German companies to fund and ran private railways. European powers used their technological know how in different zones of influence, which they divided amongst themselves. According to Ozyuksel, European entities saw railways as a mean to expand their political or economic influence as well as made it easier to begin operating economically in the "undeveloped country". The Ottomans were interested in the economic, social and military advantages of the railways. The first railways were built by the British, such as their Ottoman Railway Company, during the mid 19th century. This was done in order to transport the fig harvest to Izmir. Companies from Germany built the well known Orient Express, which ran from Turkey to Europe. The Germans also built the Turkish part of the Berlin–Baghdad railway.

=== European and Ottoman interests ===
The Ottomans wished to integrate more deeply into Europe and saw the establishment of railways connecting the empire with European markets as a way to further this goal. Financial problems and the lack of engineering knowledge delayed significantly the implementation of such connector projects. Following this, the empire began to interact with European investors and entities to further its railway projects. The empire contracted investor the Austrian, Baron Hirsch, to develop 2000 km of railways however, the British and French prevented the raising of money in the Paris and London stock exchanges. This led to a revisal of plans. Eventually 1279 km of tracks were built and the Ottoman network was not connected to the Austrian network and thus unconnected to the rest of Europe.

By the end of 1913, 42% of the 3700 million pounds of British investment in the Ottoman Empire was in the railways. 15% of the 1800 million pounds invested by the French was put into railways. The Germans invested 750 million pounds, 25% of which funded railways. Ottoman interests were oriented around modernizing the empire. Ottoman transportation until then relied on animals such as mules and camels, rivers were short and often were not suitable for inland travel therefore railways provided a solution to improve the Ottoman transport system. Railways significantly increased trade in the regions where they were established, in the İzmir–Aydın region, trade increased 13 fold from 1856 to 1909.

==== Germans ====
The Germans were notably involved in the railways connecting Istanbul and Baghdad, the Anatolian Railway as well as private German initiatives in the Balkan part of the empire. Some of these projects were financed through Deutsche bank which was backed by the German foreign ministry. The German company Krupp Steel also took part. According to Özyüksel, the Germans sought to increase their influence in the region as well as increase the reliability of the Ottoman army if war were to break out. The Ottomans wished for the Germans to concentrate more efforts in their regions. According to Özyüksel, the positive attitude toward the Germans was born from the scepticism toward other powers. Other powers attempted to cause rifts within the empire and bring about the secession of regions, even Muslim regions from the empire, while the Germans did not engage in such activity. Özyüksel says this made the Germans more "popular" in the empire The Russians, French and British each sought to prevent the Germans from enlarging the German sphere of influence to the Persian Gulf through the Istanbul Baghdad railway. The Russians saw the German railway as preventing the southern Russian expansion, the French felt their attempt to establish themselves in Syria would be negatively impeded while the British were uneasy due to their passage to India according to Özyüksel.

The Germans also conducted topographical surveys of the Ottoman empire in order to lay out the railways.

==== British ====
The British wanted to shorten journeys to British held India, rail transport through the Ottoman Empire which sits between Europe and Iran. The Isknenderiye-Kahire was built for this purpose. The British built multiple railways including the Constanza-Cernavoda, Izmir(then called Smyrna) - Kasaba, Izmir - Aydın and Varna - Ruse lines.

=== Railways ===
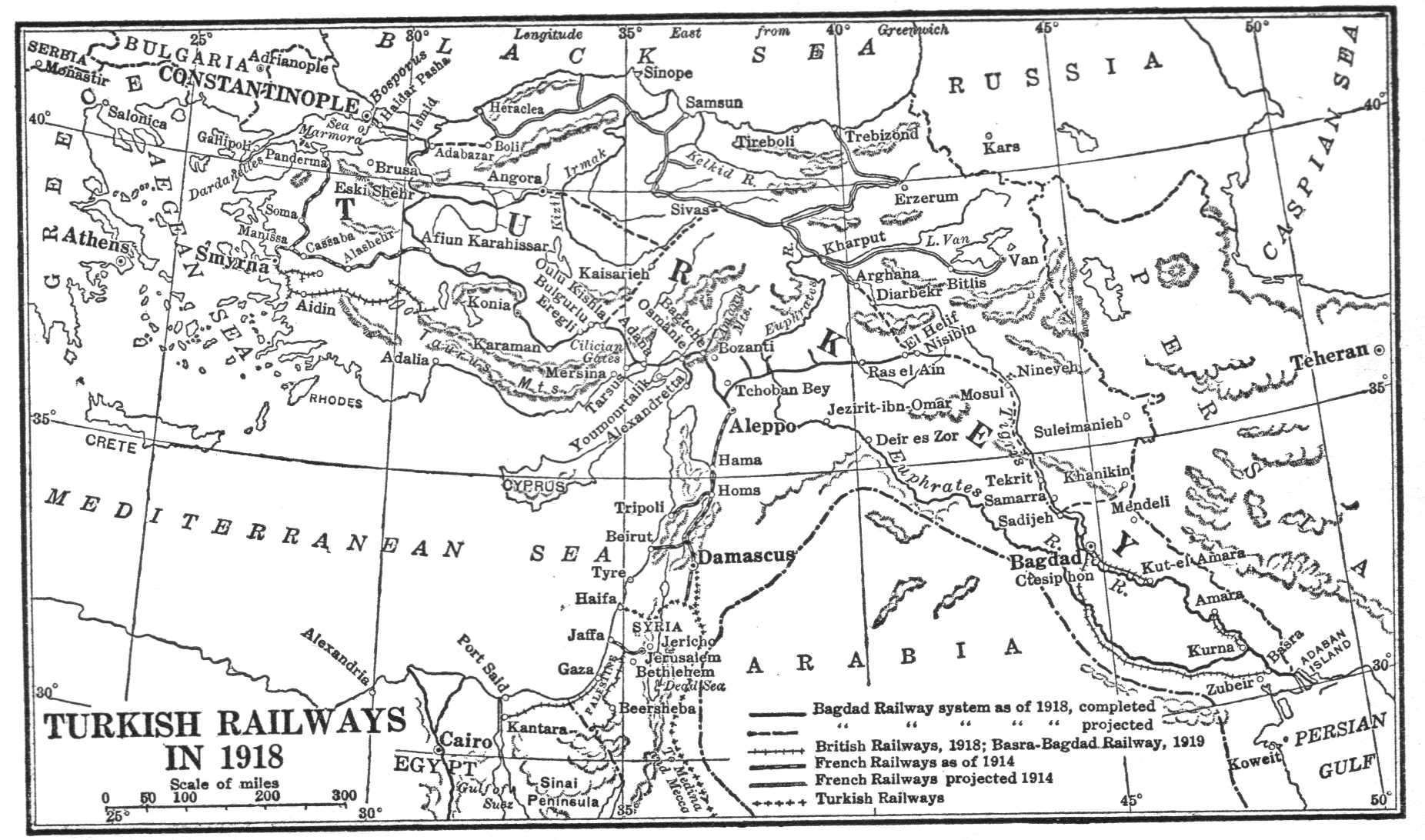
Turkish railways map (1918)

==== İzmir–Aydın railway (1860–) ====
The first railway to be constructed in Turkey was the İzmir (the Turkish name of Smyrna)–Aydın line, the first part of which was opened in 1860. Further construction and extension of the line continued up to 1912, by which time the total length was in excess of 700 km. The line was built by the British.

==== İzmir-Kasaba ====
The railway was built by the British between the city of Smyrna, now Izmir to Kasaba.

==== İzmir–Turgutlu railway (1865–) ====
The second railway to be opened was the İzmir–Turgutlu railway. As with the İzmir–Aydın line expansion continued for several decades, and by 1912 the total length was well in excess of 500 km.

==== European (Şark) railway (1871–) ====
In 1871 the Yenikapı to Florya section of the Sark railway opened, further lines were added in the years 1872 and 1873 to create 288 km of lines. A further extension was added in 1912 of 46 km.

==== Anatolian railway (1872–) ====
The first section of the Anatolian railway opened in 1872, and the line saw constant growth through the next three decades.

==== Mersin Tarsus Adana railway (1882–) ====
The Mersin to Adana opened the section to Yenice in 1882, and was completed, having reached Adana by 1886.

==== Baghdad railway (1904–) ====
The Baghdad (in modern day Iraq) railway extended into Turkey, with lines reaching Konya and other parts of western Turkey.

==== Cenup railway (1912–) ====
Also known as the Southern Railway it was first opened in 1912.

== Republic Period ==
=== Early 20th century ===
During the Turkish War of Independence, the new breakaway government in Ankara held control over sections of railways located in central and southern Anatolia. In 1920, these were brought under the roof of Chemin de Fer d'Anatolie ("Anadolu Şimendiferleri" - distinct from "Ottoman Anatolian Railways") with its center in Ankara and administered by Behiç Erkin, the founding figure of modern Turkey's railway network and a colonel at the time. Erkin pursued his office as director general beyond the war during a crucial period that lasted until 1926, after which he was Turkey's minister for transport for two years.

In 1923, Turkish railways entered what the Turkish State Railways term the "Republic Period", a "golden age" that lasted until 1950. During this time, the railways that had already been created were repurposed to serve Turkish financial interests, prioritizing industrial growth in such industries as iron, steel and coal. In addition to claiming existing lines, the Turkish government extended lines into the previously underrepresented Central and Eastern areas of Turkey to achieve near balance. Between 1935 and 1945, emphasis was placed on construction of junction lines, to improve industrial connectivity and also strengthen national defense. As a result, distance of travel between various points was significantly shortened.

During this period, the following main routes were constructed:

- Ankara-Kayseri-Sivas
- Sivas-Erzurum (Caucasus line)
- Samsun-Kalin (near Sivas)
- Irmak-Filyos Zonguldak (coal line)
- Adana-Fevzipaşa-Diyarbakır (Copper line)
- Sivas-Çetinkaya (Iron line)

=== Late 20th century ===
According to Turkish State Railways, beginning in 1950 the railways of Turkey were ignored and neglected as focus turned to highways. There was no full signaling in Turkey until 1950. In the early part of the period, the improvement of the roadway system was conceived to support the rail system, but instead of the coordinated building of both road and rail structures intended, railroad constructed slowed dramatically.

The Central Treaty Organisation, dissolved after the Iranian Revolution, sponsored some railway building with British money. A railway line, some of which was completed, was built to enable a rail connexion between London and Tehran via Van. A section from Lake Van in Turkey to Sharafkhaneh in Iran was completed and funded in large part by CENTO (mainly the UK). The civil engineering was especially challenging because of the difficult terrain. Part of the route included a rail ferry across Lake Van with a terminal at Tatvan on the Western side of the lake. Notable features of the railway on the Iranian side included 125 bridges, among them the Towering Quotor span, measuring 1,485 ft (453 m) in length, spanning a gorge 396 ft (121 m) deep.

In the 1980s, the national transportation plan "1983–1993 Transportation Interim Planning" was adopted with a goal in part of decreasing highway transportation share from 72% to 36%, but the plan was abolished in 1986 without implementation.

=== 21st century ===
In 2002, only 4% of freight transported in Turkey traveled by rail, and only 2% of passenger travel was conducted by rail. As of 2026, this is uplifted to 6% in freight and 7% in passenger.

==== Operator - Infrastructure split ====
Turkish State Railways (TCDD) was split with the passenger and freight operations being part of a new company named TCDD Transport from 2017, with TCDD left as a track and infrastructure operator. This restructuring may also allow other rail operators to run trains on TCDD tracks by means of track access charges, and end the monopoly of TCDD.

The new law about liberalization of Turkish railway transportation was accepted by the Turkish Parliament and approved by the President in 2013. According to the law, TCDD remained the owner of infrastructure and the new company TCDD Taşımacılık AŞ operates the trains. Private companies may soon be allowed to run on TCDD infrastructure as well as the new infrastructure owned by private companies if constructed. Turkish Ministry of Transportation had a plan of constructing 4,000 km (2,485 mi) conventional and 10,000 km (6,214 mi) high speed lines until 2023. There are also some commuter rail projects like Marmaray and Başkentray.

==== High speed ====
Istanbul and Ankara are Turkey's largest two cities, having a combined population over 20 million. Transportation demand between the two cities is expectedly high. The Otoyol 4 motorway is a major highway between the two cities, and the Ankara–Istanbul route is the busiest domestic air route in the country. The route between Istanbul and Ankara by rail has been a single-track line, and trains usually were delayed 30 minutes to 2 hours plus the average 7 hours, 30 minutes travel time. Rail transport in Turkey was already at its lowest point, so in 2003 the State Railways and the Turkish Ministry of Transport made an agreement to build a 533 km (331 mi) line between the two cities. The line would be an electrified double trackline. Construction began in 2004 from Esenkent to Eskişehir. The line was completed on 23 April 2007.

On 28 February 2007 TCDD requested bids for high-speed train sets from other networks to be tested on the completed portion of the high-speed line.

On 30 March 2007, TCDD signed an agreement with Trenitalia of Ferrovie dello Stato to rent an ETR 500 train set for 4 months for testing the system.

The first run was from Haydarpaşa Terminal in Istanbul to the Central Station in Ankara, using the completed portion of the high-speed line between Hasanbey and Esenkent.

On 14 September 2007 the ETR 500 Y2 set a speed record in Turkey, reaching 303 km/h (188.3 mph). This test received extensive media coverage in Turkey.

On 20 November 2007 the first TCDD HT65000 high-speed train sets purchased from CAF of Spain entered Turkey from the Kapıkule border station in Edirne, and tests were subsequently made with these trains prior to the commencement of services on 13 March 2009.

In 2010 one of the YHT trains was converted into a test train in order to test and measure the new lines. The Transportation Ministry spent 14 million TL (around 7 million Euros at that time) for the installation of testing and measuring equipment on the train, which it named – because it is a tradition to give a name to test trains – as "Piri Reis" after the renowned Turkish admiral and cartographer who drew some of the most accurate and detailed maps of the Mediterranean Sea and the Americas in the early 16th century.

TCDD requested bids for the name of the high-speed service. Out of over 100 entries, the ones with the highest votes were: Türk Yıldızı (Turkish Star), Turkuaz (Turquoise), Yüksek Hızlı Tren (High Speed Train), Çelik Kanat (Steel Wing) and Yıldırım (Lightning). TCDD chose Yüksek Hızlı Tren to be the name of the service.

On 13 March 2009, the inauguration ceremony took place in Ankara; attended by President Abdullah Gül, Prime Minister Recep Tayyip Erdoğan, and Minister of Transport Binali Yıldırım, who started the first phase of the YHT service running between Ankara and Eskişehir.

== Museums ==
- TCDD Open Air Steam Locomotive Museum in Ankara
- Istanbul Railway Museum
- Çamlık Railway Museum
- Rahmi M. Koç Museum

== Timeline of railway investment and construction under the Ottoman Empire ==
(Notes on investors: O: Ottoman Empire, A: Austria, B: Belgium, F: France, G: Germany, S: Switzerland, UK: United Kingdom, Int'l: International investors; Source: Roth - Dinhobl, p. 188)

CONSTRUCTED MAIN LINES; Constructed branches	Year of concession	length in km	construction period	initial investors	later investors
LINE IN ISOLATION; Köstence (Constanţa today) - Boğazköy (Cernavodă today)	1856	66	1859–1860	UK	UK
İZMİR-AYDIN RAILWAY AND PROLONGEMENTS (Oriental Railway Company)
İzmir-Aydın section	1856	130	1856–1867	UK	UK
Aydın-Sütlaç-Çivril section and Sütlaç-Dinar-Eğirdir section	1879/1911	342	1879–1912	UK	UK
Tire-Ödemiş section	1882/1911	137	1883–1911	UK	UK
LINE IN ISOLATION; Rusçuk (Ruse today) - Varna	1861	224	1863–1866	UK	UK
THE SMYRNE CASSABA RAILWAY AND PROLONGEMENTS
İzmir-Kasaba (Turgutlu) section	1863	93	1863–1866	UK	F
İzmir-Bornova section	1863	5	1866	UK	F
Kasaba (Turgutlu) - Alaşehir section	1872	76	1872–1875	UK	F
Manisa - Soma connection	1888	92	1888–1890	UK	F
Alaşehir-Afyon (Afyonkarahisar) section	1884	252	1894–1896	F	F
Soma-Bandırma connection	1910	184	1910–1912	F	F
ORIENTAL RAILWAY (also famous for the Orient Express)
Istanbul-Edirne section	1868/1869	318	1869–1870	F - B - S - A	G
Eastern Rumelia section	1868/1869	386	1872–1888	F - B - S - A	G
Salonica-Mitrovica (Kosovska Mitrovica today) section	1868/1869	363	1872–1874	F - B - S - A	G
Edirne - Dedeağaç (Alexandroupoli today) section	1868/1869	149	1870–1872	F - B - S - A	G
Bosnia section	1868/1869	102	1870–1872	F - B - S - A	G
Babaeski- Kırklareli connection	1910	46	1911–1913	F - B - S - A	G
Üsküp (Skopje today) - Serbia border connection	1885	131	1885–1887	Int'l	Int'l
LINE IN ISOLATION; Mudanya - Bursa (Chemin de Fer Moudania Brousse)	1881	41	1872–1892	O - F - B	O - F - B
LINE IN ISOLATION (later connected to Baghdad Railway); Mersin-Tarsus-Adana Railway	1883	68	1885–1886	UK	F
ANATOLIAN RAILROAD
Haydarpaşa-İzmit section (later incorporated to Baghdad Railway)	1871	93	1871–1873	O	G
İzmit-Eskişehir-Ankara section (İzmit-Eskişehir section later incorporated to Baghdad Railway)	1888	486	1888–1890	G	G
Eskişehir-Konya connection (later incorporated to Baghdad Railway)	1893	445	1893–1896	G	G
Arifiye-Adapazarı connection	1898	9	1898–1899	G	G
DEDEAĞAÇ-MANASTIR LINE
Salonica-Monastir (Bitola today)	1890	219	1891–1894	G	G
Dedeağaç-Salonica	1892	508	1892–1896	F	F
BAGHDAD RAILWAY
Konya-Karapınar-Ulukışla section	1898	291	1904–1912	G	G
Toprakkale-İskenderun section	1898	59	1904–1912	G	G
Islahiye-Resulayn section	1898	453	1911–1914	G	G
Baghdad-Samarra section	1898	119	1912–1914	G	G

== See also ==
- Orient Express
- Narrow gauge railways in Turkey
- Rail transport in Turkey
- Turkish State Railways
