= TCDD 57001 Class =

57001 class
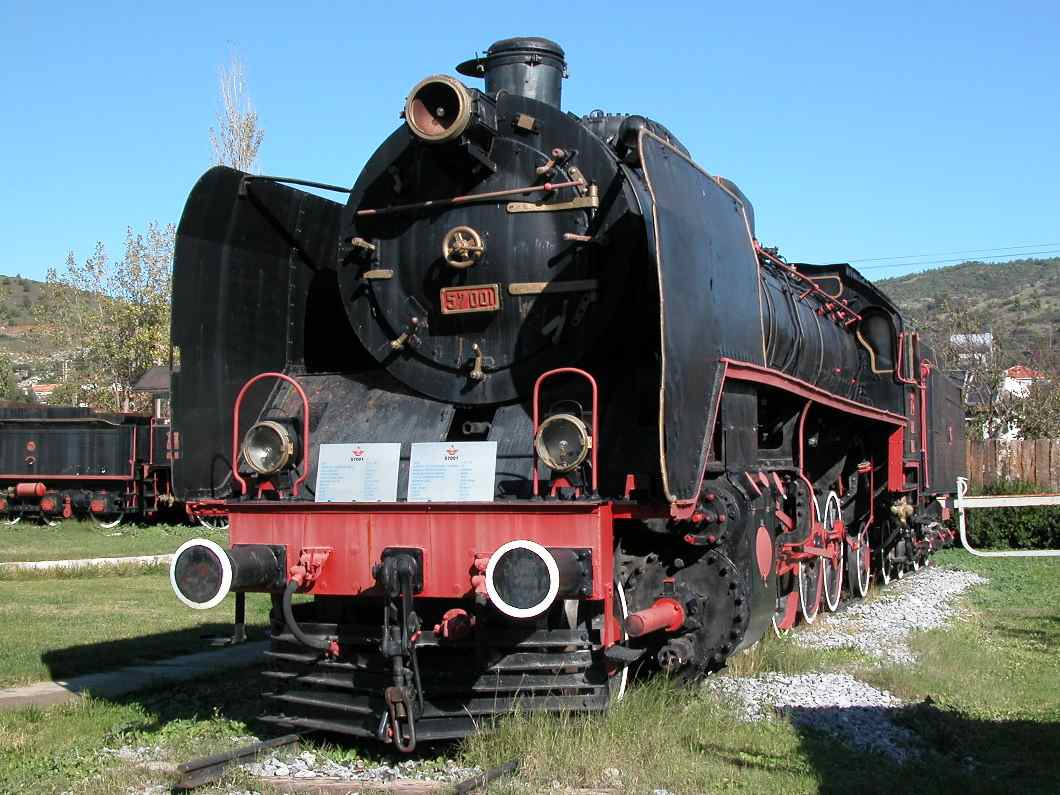
- 57001 on display at the Çamlık Railway Museum
Type and origin
- Power type: Steam
- Builder: Krupp (17); Henschel & Sohn (7); Berliner Maschinenbau (3)
- Build date: 1933–1937
- Total produced: 27
Specifications
- Configuration
  - Whyte: 2-10-2
  - UIC: 1′E1′ h2
- Gauge: 1,435 mm (4 ft 8 1/2 in)
- Leading dia.: 1,000 mm (3 ft 3 3/8 in)
- Driver dia.: 1,400 mm (4 ft 7 1/8 in)
- Trailing dia.: 1,000 mm (3 ft 3 3/8 in)
- Wheelbase
  - Engine: 10.9 m (35 ft 9 1/4 in)
  - Drivers: 4.5 m (14 ft 9 1/4 in)
- Length: 22.2 m (72 ft 10 in) over buffers
- Axle load: 13.4 tonnes (13.2 long tons; 14.8 short tons)
- Adhesive weight: 67.1 tonnes (66.0 long tons; 74.0 short tons)
- Loco weight: Empty: 81.3 tonnes (80.0 long tons; 89.6 short tons); Service: 90.6 tonnes (89.2 long tons; 99.9 short tons)
- Tender weight: Service: 60.6 tonnes (59.6 long tons; 66.8 short tons)
- Total weight: Service: 151.2 tonnes (148.8 long tons; 166.7 short tons)
- Tender type: 2′2′T27
- Fuel type: Coal
- Fuel capacity: 8 tonnes (7.9 long tons; 8.8 short tons)
- Water cap.: 27,000 litres (5,900 imp gal; 7,100 US gal)
- Firebox
  - Type
  - Grate area: 3.03 m^{2} (32.6 sq ft)
- Boiler
  - Tube plates: 5.000 m (16 ft 4 7/8 in)
- Boiler pressure: 12 bar (1.20 MPa; 174 psi)
- Heating surface
  - Firebox: 16.5 m^{2} (178 sq ft)
  - Total surface: 180.5 m^{2} (1,943 sq ft)
- Superheater
  - Heating area: 68.25 m^{2} (734.6 sq ft)
- Cylinders: Two, outside
- Cylinder size: 630 mm × 660 mm (24 13/16 in × 26 in)
- Valve gear: Heusinger (Walschaerts)
Performance figures
- Maximum speed: 80 km/h (50 mph)
- Power output: 1,550 PS (1,140 kW; 1,530 hp)
- Tractive effort: 190 kN (42,714 lbf)
Career
- Operators: TCDD
- Numbers: 57001 – 57027

The Turkish State Railways (TCDD) 57001 Class is a class of 2-10-2 steam locomotives. They were built by Henschel, Berliner Maschinenbau and Krupp for TCDD. The 27 locomotives in this class were numbered 57001 to 57027. The first arrived in 1933, the last in 1937.

== Preservation ==
Around 14 locomotives of this series has been preserved.

- 57001: Çamlık Museum
- 57007: Ankara Museum
- 57011: Isparta
- 57018: Çamlık Museum
- 57023: Çamlık Museum
- 57026: Çamlık Museum
