= Mersin Metro =

Metro system for the Turkish city of Mersin

Overview
- Locale: Mersin, Turkey
- Transit type: Rapid transit
- Number of lines: 1 (planned)
- Number of stations: 11 (planned)

Operation
- Began operation: 2028

Technical
- System length: 13.4 km (8.3 mi)
- Track gauge: 1,435 mm (4 ft 8 1/2 in) (standard gauge)
- Top speed: 80 km/h (49.7 mph)

The Mersin Metro is a proposed rapid transit system for the Turkish city of Mersin. Construction began in 2024, and will take 48 months to complete.

== Background ==
Planning for the metro first began in 2018. Originally planned as a 20km line with 15 stations, the project was revised to reduce costs and the length and number of stations was reduced to 13.4 km and 11 stations, respectively. In October 2020, the city of Mersin announced that 13 companies had submitted bids to build the first metro line. The line will link Mezitli in the southwest with Üçocak in the northeast and include an interchange with the city’s train station. Services are excepted to run at a maximum speed of 80 km/h, offering a total journey time of 23 min.

== Stations ==
Name	Station	District	Connections
1	Viranşehir	Mezitli	
2	Mezitli Kent Meydanı	Mezitli	
3	Üniversite	Yenişehir	T1 University Tram Line (Planned)
4	Marina	Yenişehir	
5	Barbaros	Yenişehir	
6	Pozcu	Yenişehir	
7	Muğdat	Yenişehir	
8	Tulumba	Yenişehir	
9	Özgür Çocuk Parkı	Akdeniz	
10	Gar	Akdeniz	Mersin Railway Station
11	Üçocak Kent Meydanı	Akdeniz	M2 Üçocak-Otogar Metro Line (Planned)

== See also ==
- Rail transport in Turkey
