= Trams in Antalya =

Tram and light rail network in Antalya, Turkey

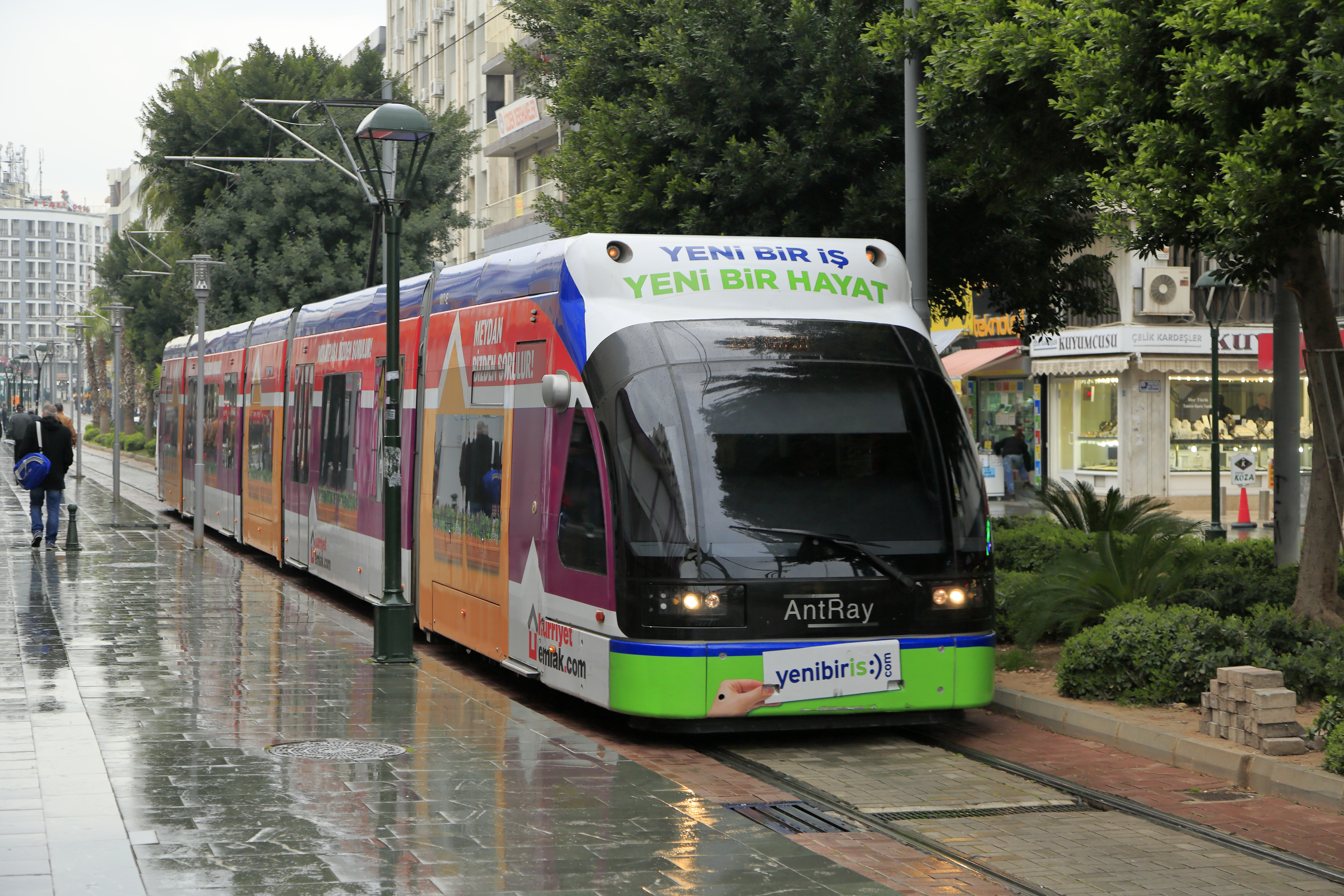

Operation
- Locale: Antalya, Turkey
- Open: 1999, 2009
- Status: Operational
- Lines: T1 A/B/C; T2 (Nostalji Tramvayı); T3
- Operator: Antalya Ulaşım A.Ş.

Infrastructure
- Track gauge: 1,435 mm (4 ft 8 1/2 in) (standard gauge)

Statistics
Overview

Trams form part of the public transport network in Antalya, Turkey. Currently, a three-line system is operated by Antalya Ulaşım A.Ş.

== AntRay ==
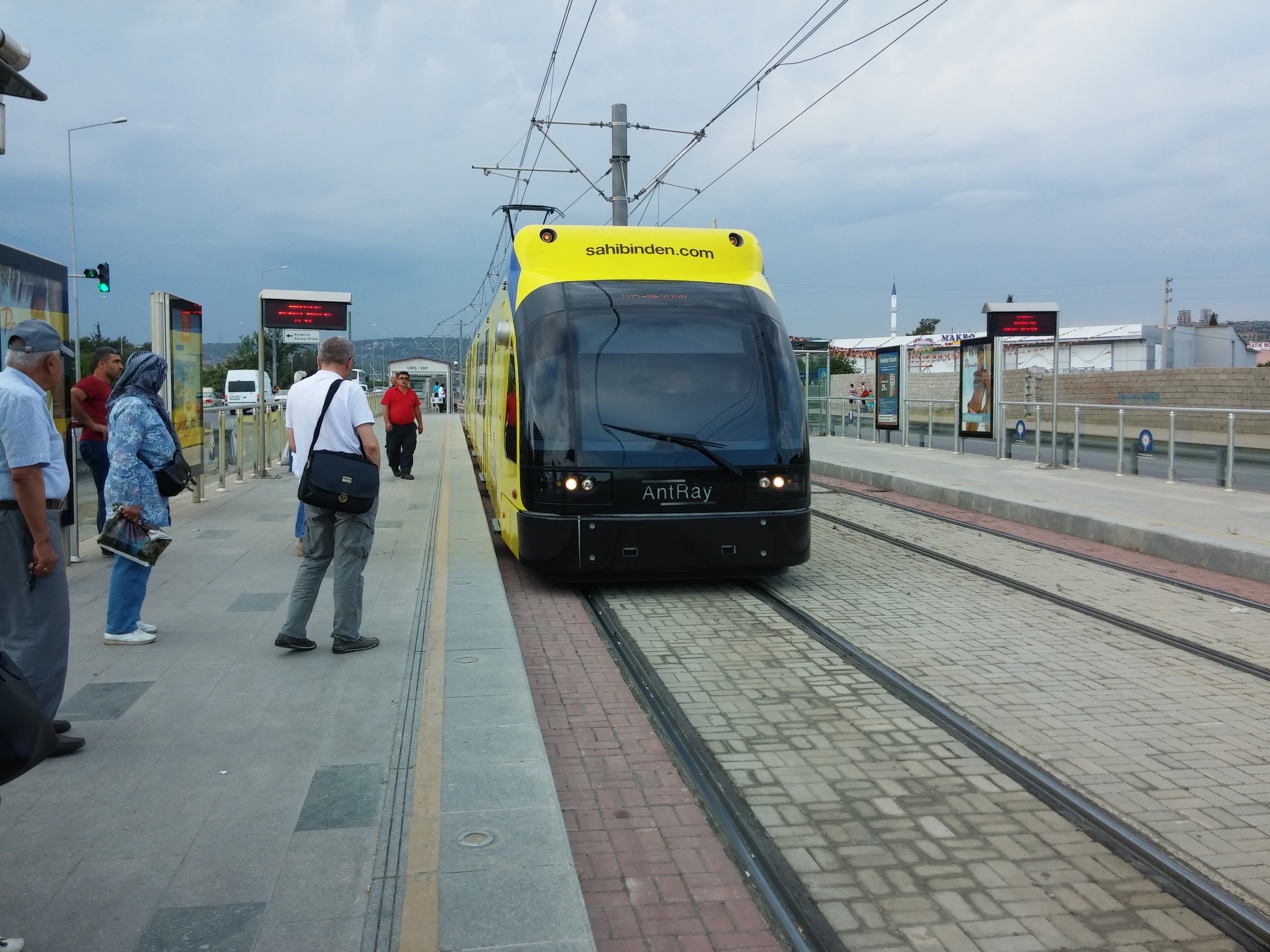
AntRay, CAF Urbos 2 tram

The first 11.1-kilometre (6.9 mi) long phase of the modern Antray light rail network opened in December 2009 as the T1, a double-track 16-stop line connecting the north of the city to the center. It has 16 stops, including two cut-and-cover (underground) stations, and a depot at the northern terminus of Fatih. The tram stations are as follows: Fatih - Kepezaltı -Ferrokrom - Vakıf Çiftliği - Otogar - Pil Fabrikası - Dokuma - Çallı - Emniyet - Sigorta - Şarampol - Muratpaşa - İsmetpaşa - Doğu Garajı - Burhanettin Onat - Meydan.

In 2015, a Transport Ministry tender for the extension of the line to Airport, Aksu and Expo 2016 was awarded to Makyol. The project was planned to last 450 days, and to be completed by December 2016, but test runs started on 3 April 2016 with a ceremony, about 300 days before the original deadline. Regular services on the extension started on 14 July 2016. The 15.4-kilometre (9.6 mi) extension from Meydan to Expo 2016 has a 2.4 km (1.5 mi) long branch to the Airport, and has 15 stops. New tram stations are as follows: Kışla - Topçular - Demokrasi - Cırnık - Altınova - Yenigöl - Sinan - Yonca Kavşak - (Havalimanı/Airport) - Pınarlı ANFAŞ - Kurşunlu - Aksu-1 - Aksu-2 - Aksu-3 - EXPO.

The fleet consists of 14 Urbos 2 trams, with five modules each and 100% low-floor, supplied by CAF for the opening of the Antray line in 2009. In August 2015, Eurotem, a joint venture of South Korea’s Hyundai Rotem and Turkish company Tüvasaş, won an order for 18 new trams, required because of the extension of the tram line.

Work on a new line, the T3, started in 2017 with the approval of construction by the central government. Test running on the first phase of the line started in January 2019, and regular services running from Varsak to Atatürk started on 11 August 2019. The second phase of the line, running from Atatürk to Müze, opened on 25 October 2021. The full line starts in Varsak and passes the Main Bus Station (Otogar), Akdeniz University Hospital, the Research Hospital and Antalya Museum. Although the line was planned to be merged with the current nostalgic tram line, which was planned to convert to double track, no progress has been made. The whole line is 15 km long.

As of 2024, two lines are in the planning phase, both connecting Konyaaltı in the southwest of the city with Lara in the southeast.

== Heritage tram ==
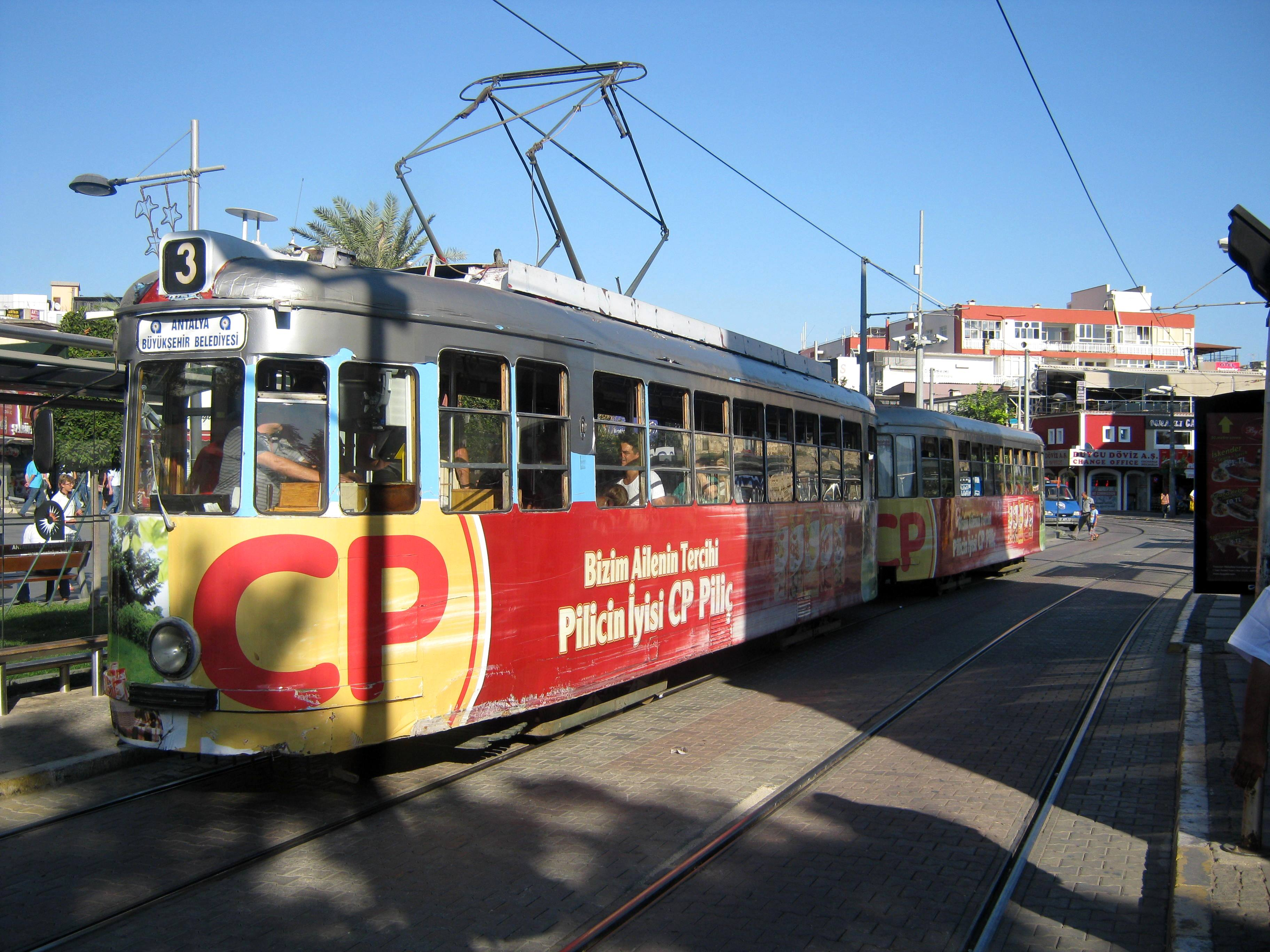
Nostalgic tram

A single-track 4.7 km (2.9 mi) long heritage tram line (or nostalgic tram; Turkish: Nostalji tramvay hatti), known as the T2, opened on 27 March 1999 using ex-Nuremberg tramcars. It runs from Antalya Museum along the main boulevard through the city center at Kale Kapısı, Hadrian's Gate, Karaalioglu Park, and ends on the road to Lara Plajı (Beach) to the east. There are three passing points, but trams by-pass one other at the central Cumhuriyet Meydanı stop and passing point. The stops are as follows: Müze - Barbaros - Meslek Lisesi - Selekler - Cumhuriyet Meydanı - Kale Kapısı - Üç Kapılar - Büyükşehir Belediyesi - Işıklar - Zerdalilik.

There are only two tramcars with trailers (out of three available), MAN and Duewag cars from the 1950-60s. The heritage tramway line and the new light rail line do pass through the same intersection in the city center; however, they do not cross, nor there is a hard rail connection between the two due to electrification differences.

On 17 July 2026, the line was temporarily closed and its route replaced with bus service, primarily due to safety concerns surrounding the aging ex-Nuremberg tramcars. According to transport operator Antalya Ulaşım, the closure does not indicate a permanent abandonment of the line and its infrastructure, but rather that it will give time to conduct safety assessments, as well as technical works relating to infrastructure and rolling stock improvements. The works are expected to last around two years.
