= TCDD Open Air Steam Locomotive Museum =

Railway museum in Ankara, Turkey

Coordinates: 39.94287483776194°N 32.77258302482029°E

- TCDD Açık Hava Buharlı Lokomotif Müzesi
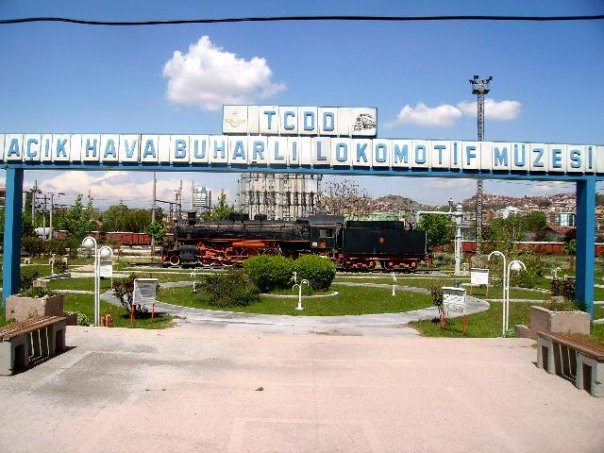
- Gate of the museum
- Location: Celal Bayar Blvd, Maltepe, Ankara, Turkey
- Website: www.tcdd.gov.tr/tcdding/ankloko_ing.htm

The TCDD Open Air Steam Locomotive Museum (Turkish: TCDD Açık Hava Buharlı Lokomotif Müzesi) is a railroad museum in Ankara, Turkey, which focuses on the history of steam locomotives that operated on the Turkish State Railways. The museum was originally located in a park adjacent to Ankara Central Station, and when the property was needed for the station's enlargement project in 2014, the museum was moved to the current location near Wonderland Eurasia. The museum is owned and operated by the Turkish State Railways (TCDD), who also manages the Ankara Railway History Museum, as well as Atatürk's Car and Railway Art Museum.

== Museum ==
Exhibits on display:

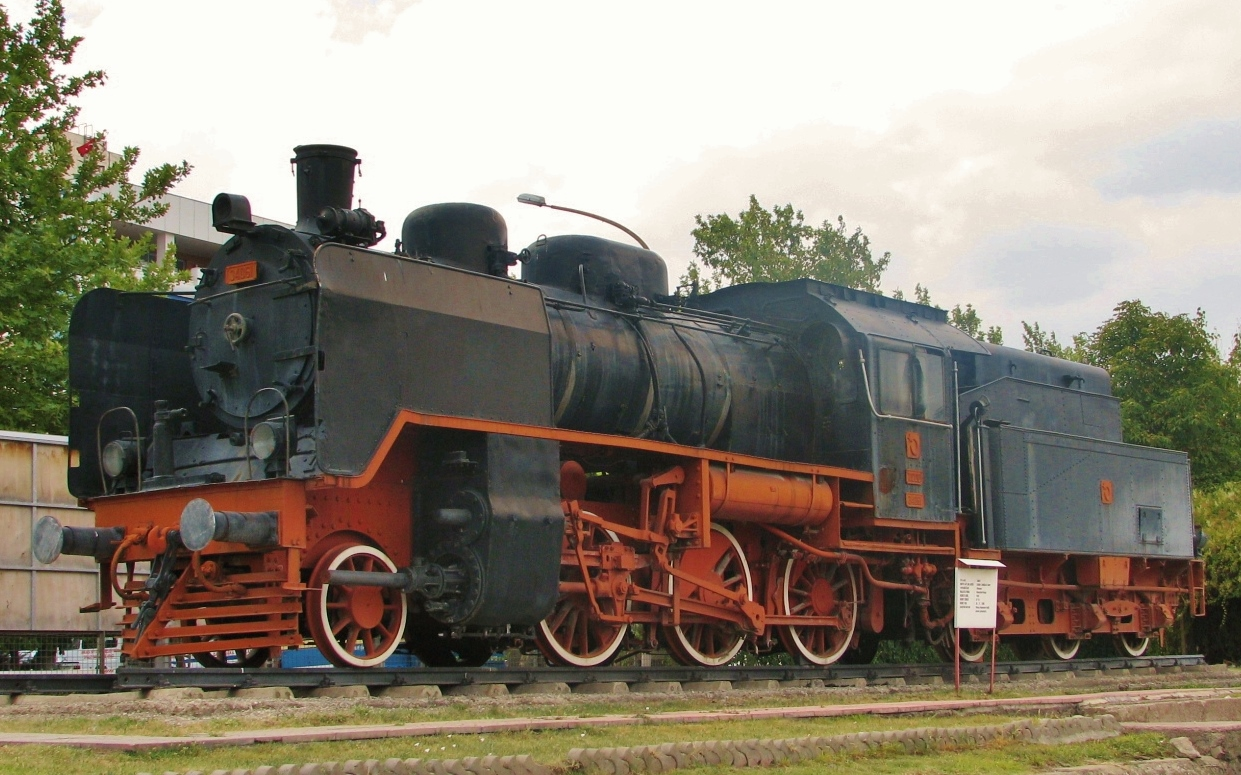
34061 1930 Henschel & Son (Germany) locomotive

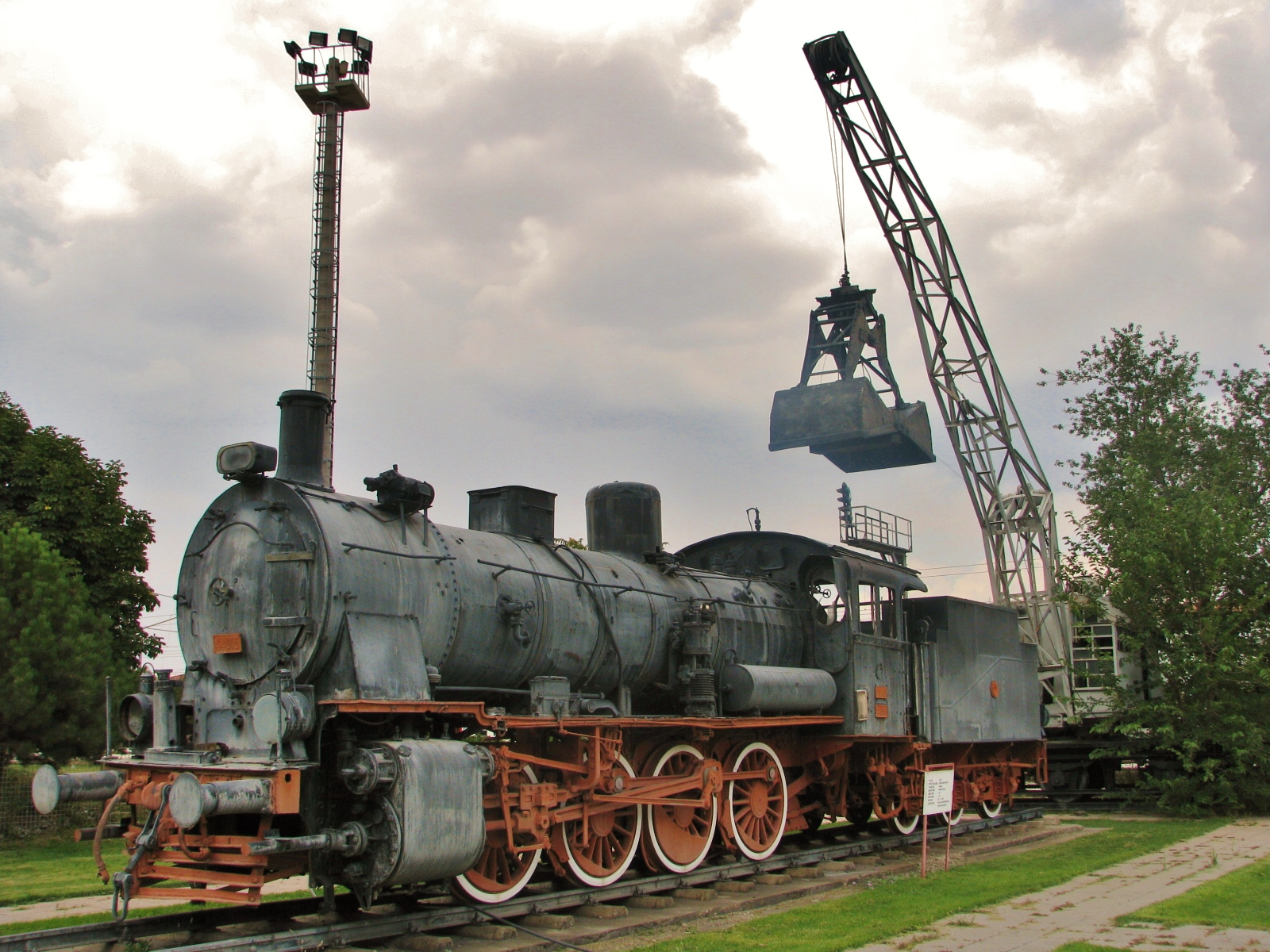
44015 1912 Hanover Vulcan (Germany) locomotive

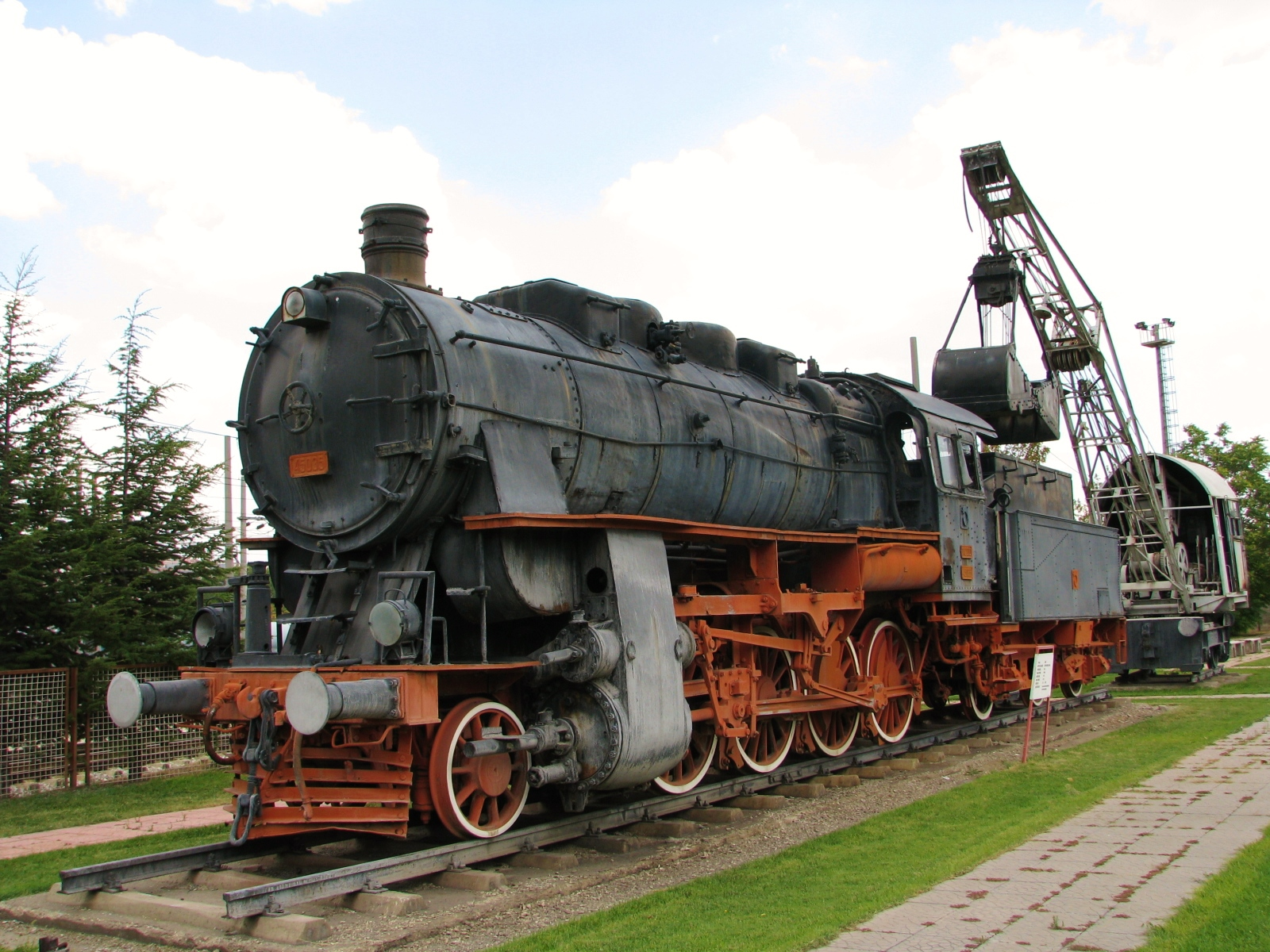
45035 1932 NOHAB (Sweden) locomotive

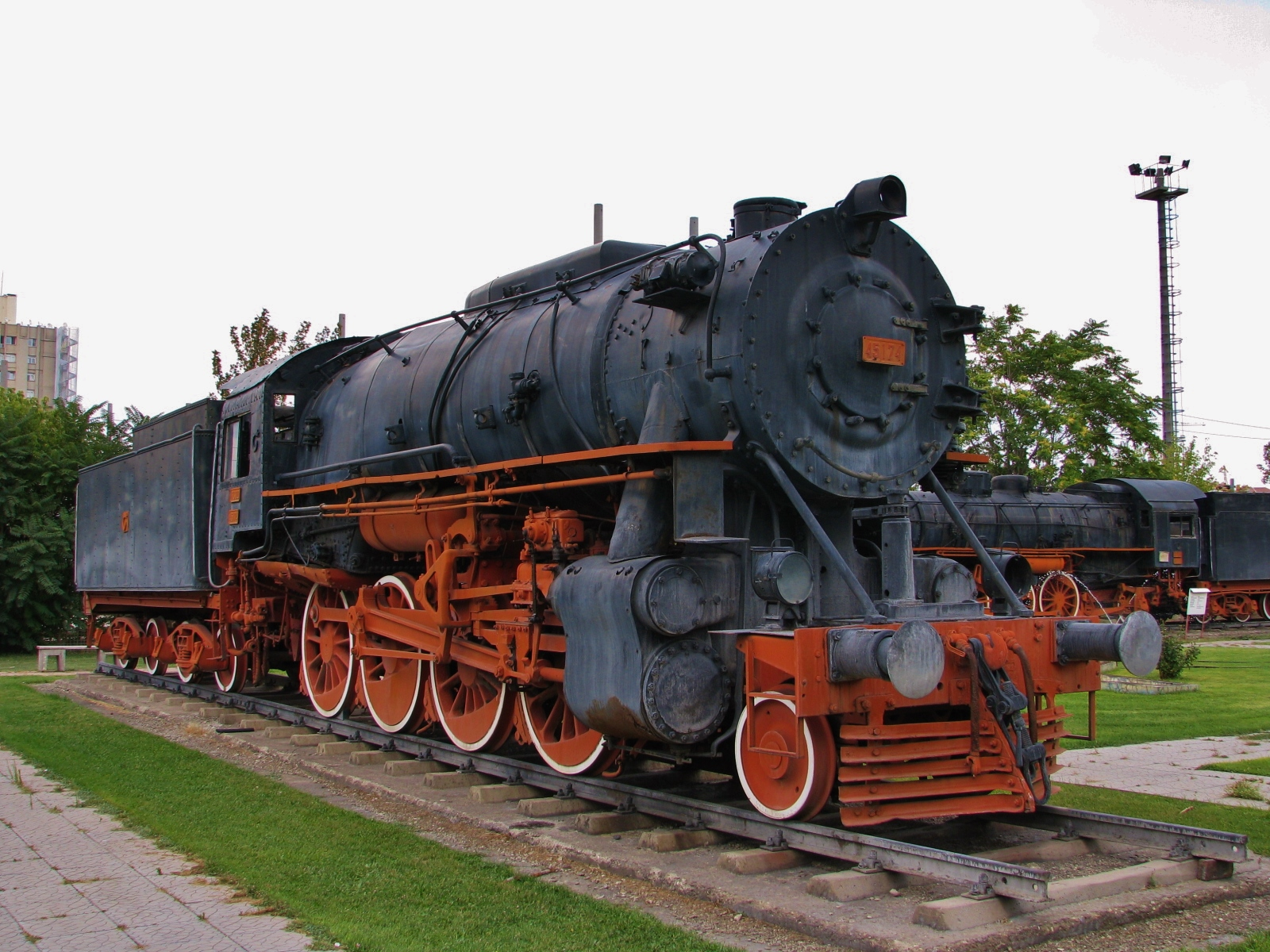
45174 1943 Baldwin Locomotive Works (United States) locomotive

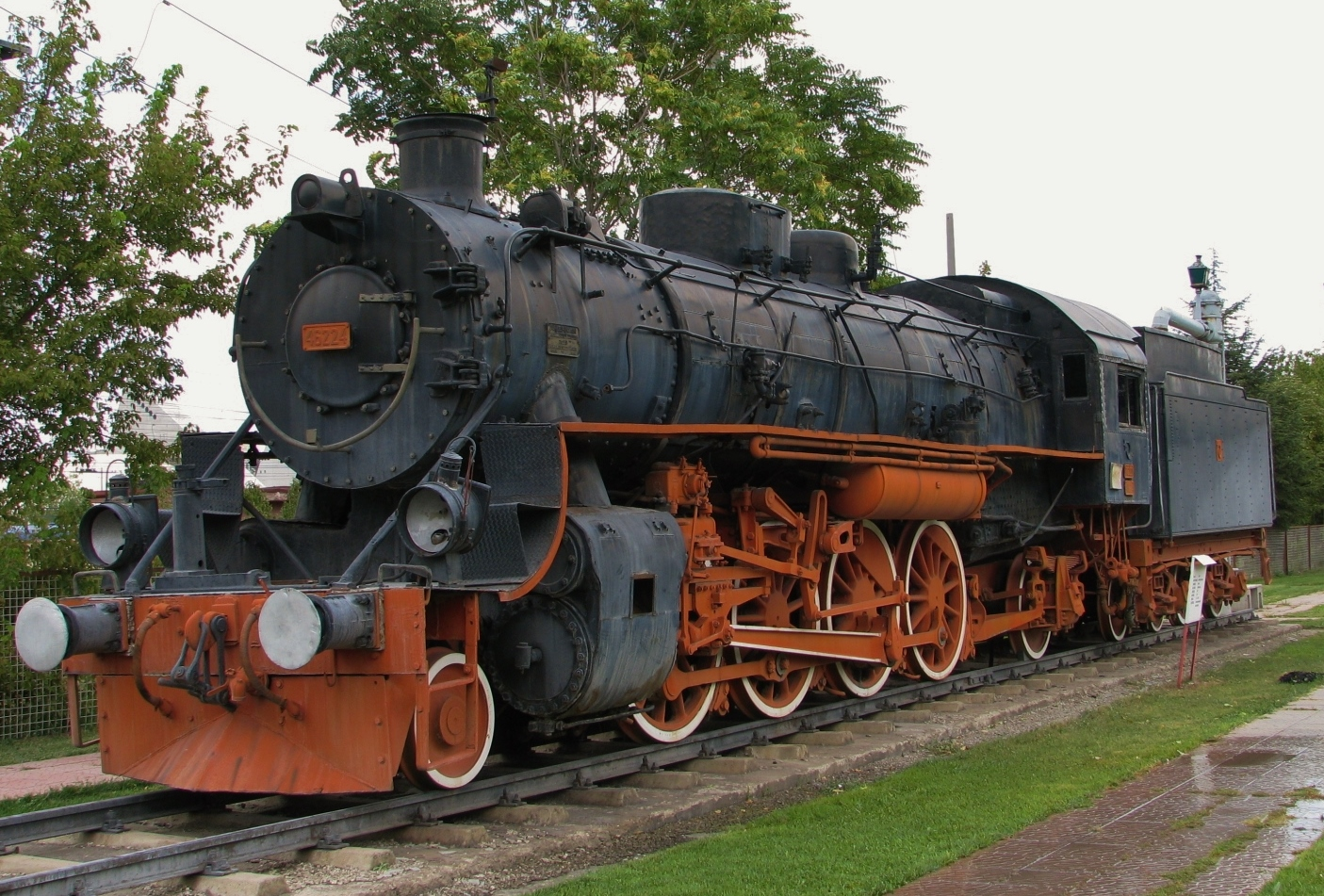
46224 1942 American Locomotive Company (United States) locomotive

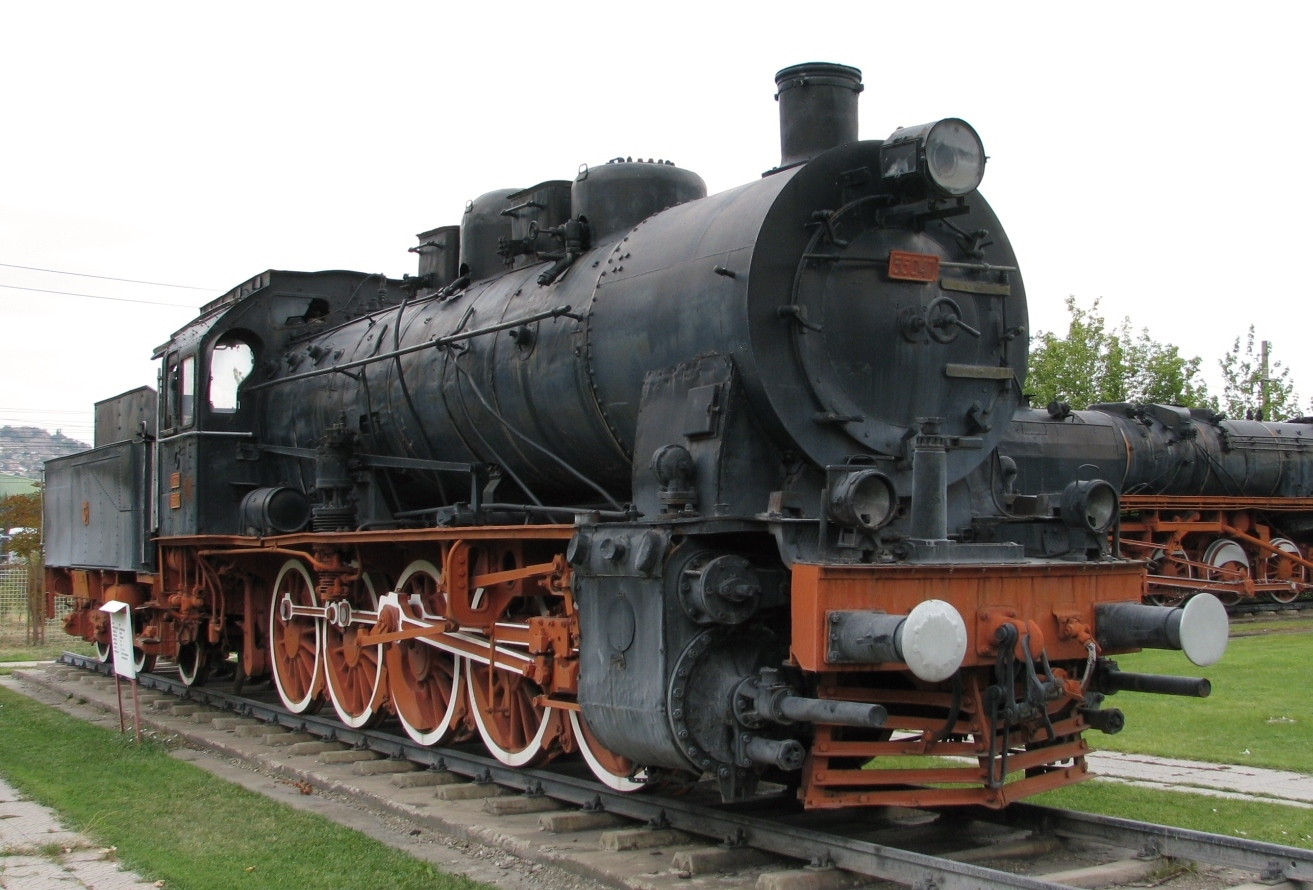
55047 1924 Schwartzkopf (Germany) locomotive

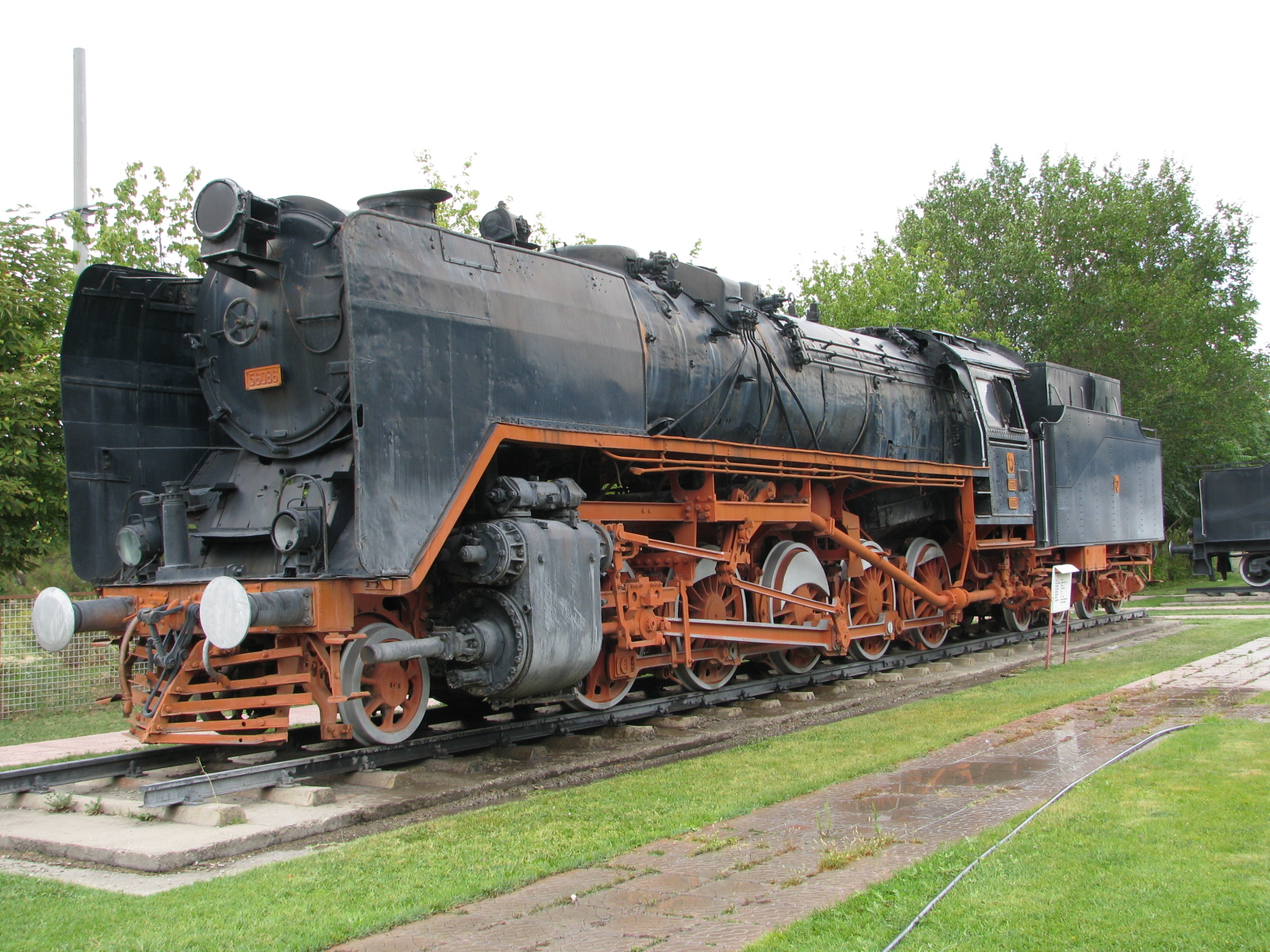
56086 1948 Vulcan Foundry (United Kingdom) locomotive

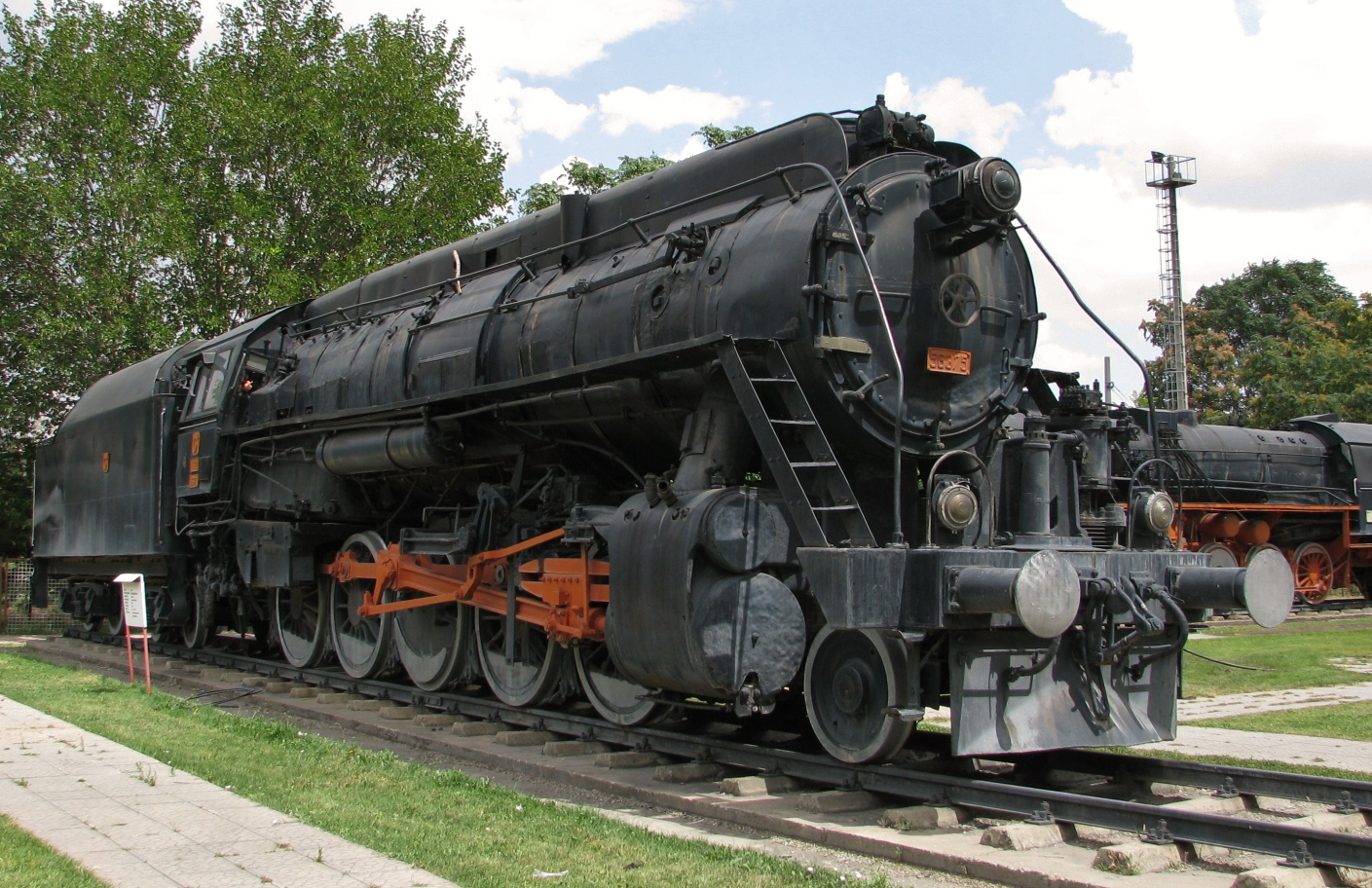
56375 1948 Vulcan Iron Works (United States) locomotive

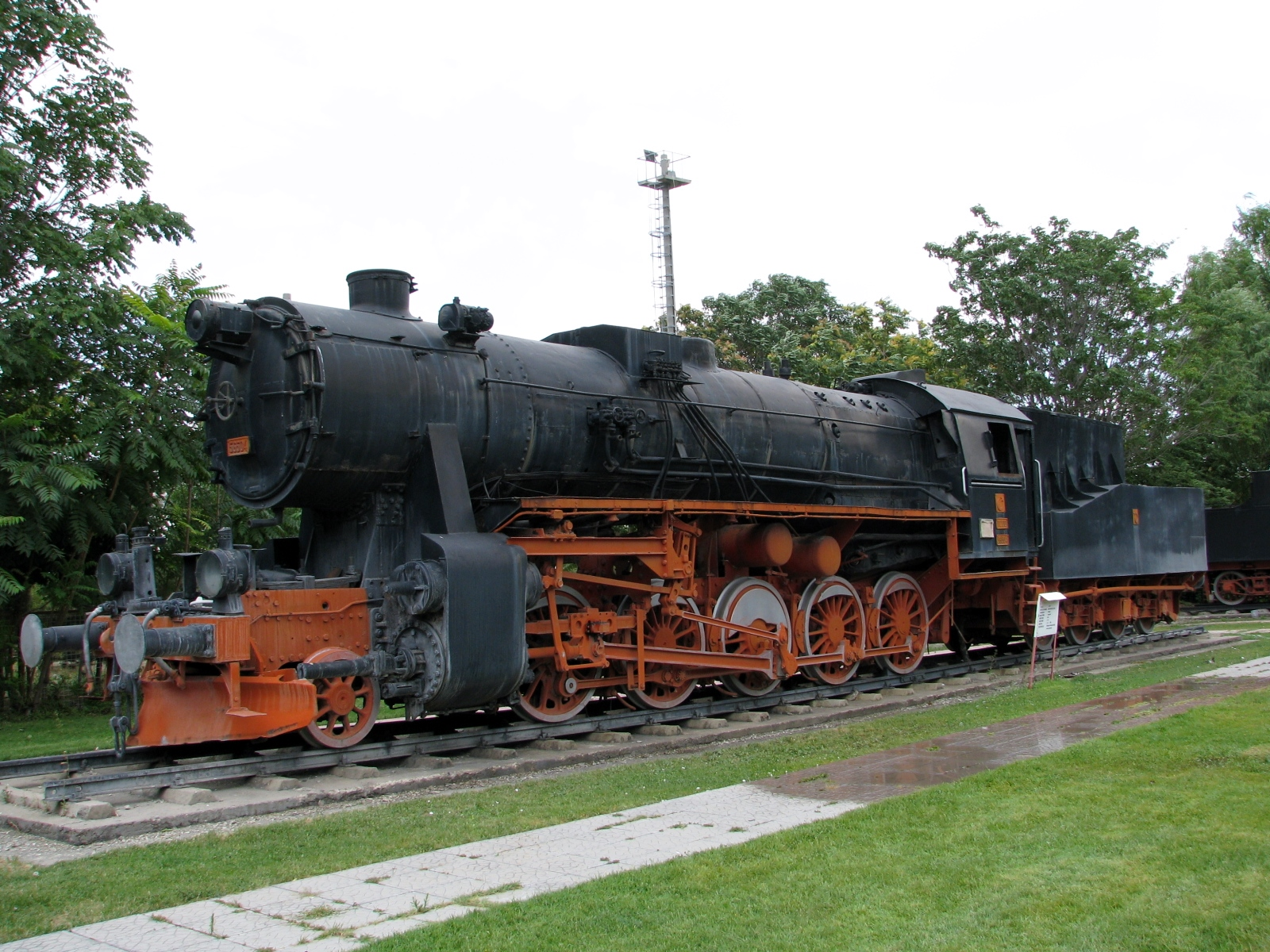
56504 1943 Henschel & Son (Germany) locomotive

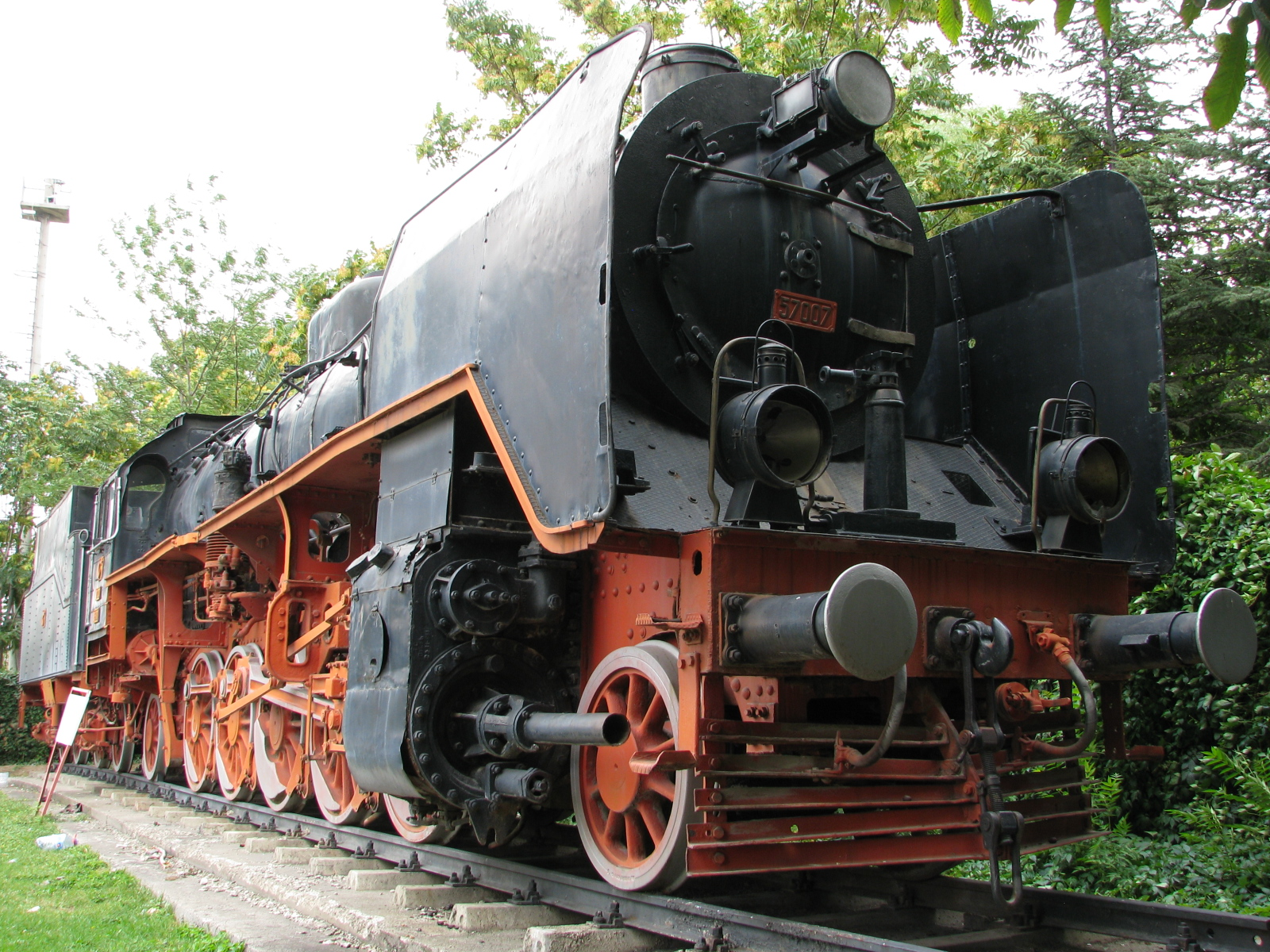
57007 1932 Henschel & Son (Germany) locomotive
- 1909 Beuchelt & Co. (Germany) Wooden Passenger carriage
- Restaurant carriage

== See also ==
- Çamlık Railway Museum, another open air steam locomotive museum in Selçuk, İzmir Province
- Istanbul Railway Museum
