= Istanbul Railway Museum =

- İstanbul Demiryolu Müzesi
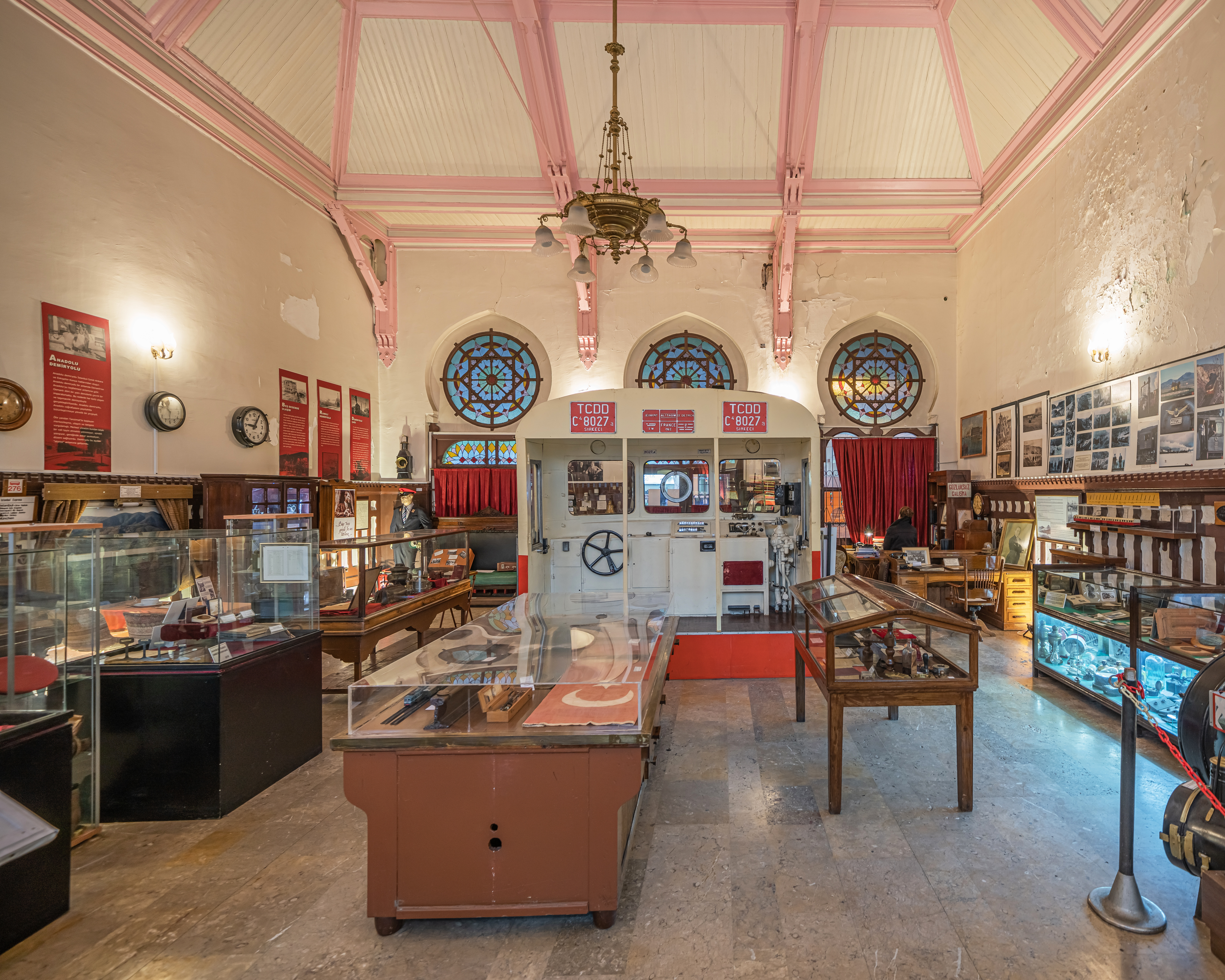

- Location in Istanbul
- Established: September 23, 2005; 20 years ago
- Location: Sirkeci, Istanbul, Turkey
- Coordinates: 41°00′55″N 28°58′38″E
- Type: Railway museum
- Visitors: 52,774 (2006)
- Website: tcdd.gov.tr

The Istanbul Railway Museum (Turkish: İstanbul Demiryolu Müzesi) is a railway museum in the historic Istanbul Sirkeci Terminal in the Sirkeci neighborhood of Fatih district in Istanbul, Turkey. Opened on September 23, 2005, the museum is owned and operated by the Turkish State Railways (TCDD).

In the museum, which is housed in the 1888-built and 1890-opened railway terminal, around 300 historical items are on display. The exhibits of the museum covering an area of 145 m^{2} (1,560 sq ft) include parts of the trains and the railway stations, photographs, and related documents. A few of these are furniture and silver services used in dining cars, station office equipment, the driver cab of an electric suburban train, manufacturer plates of some historic TCDD rolling stock, warning plates, and a station's clock and bell.

It was reported that 52,774 people, among them 31,153 foreign tourists, visited the museum in 2006.

== Admission ==
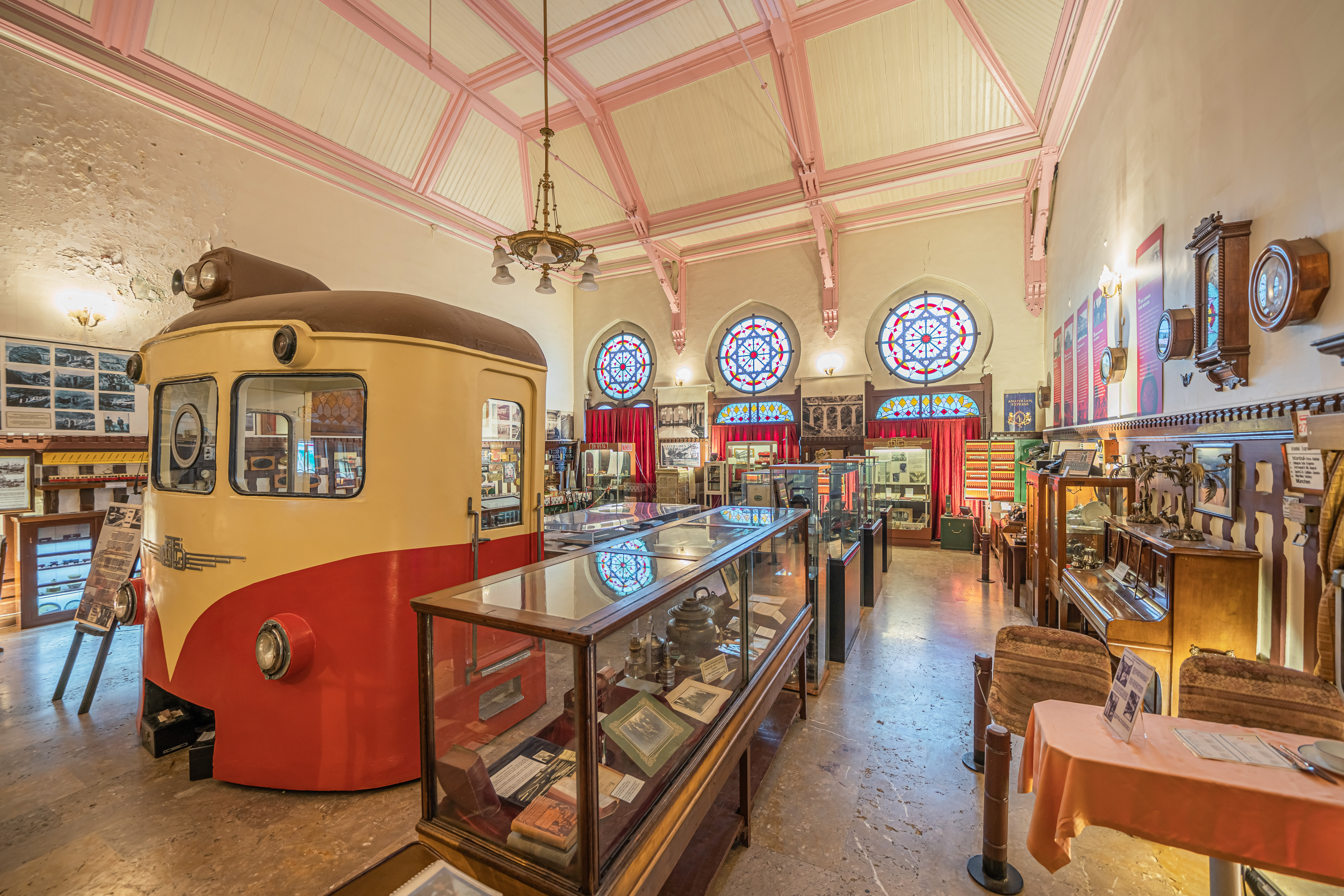
A side from inside the Railway Museum in Sirkeci district, Istanbul

The museum is open every day except Sundays and Mondays, between 9:00 and 17:00. Admission is free of charge.

== See also ==
- Çamlık Railway Museum in Selçuk, İzmir Province
- TCDD Open Air Steam Locomotive Museum in Ankara
- Atatürk's Residence and Railway Museum
