= Çamlık Railway Museum =

- Çamlık Tren Müzesi
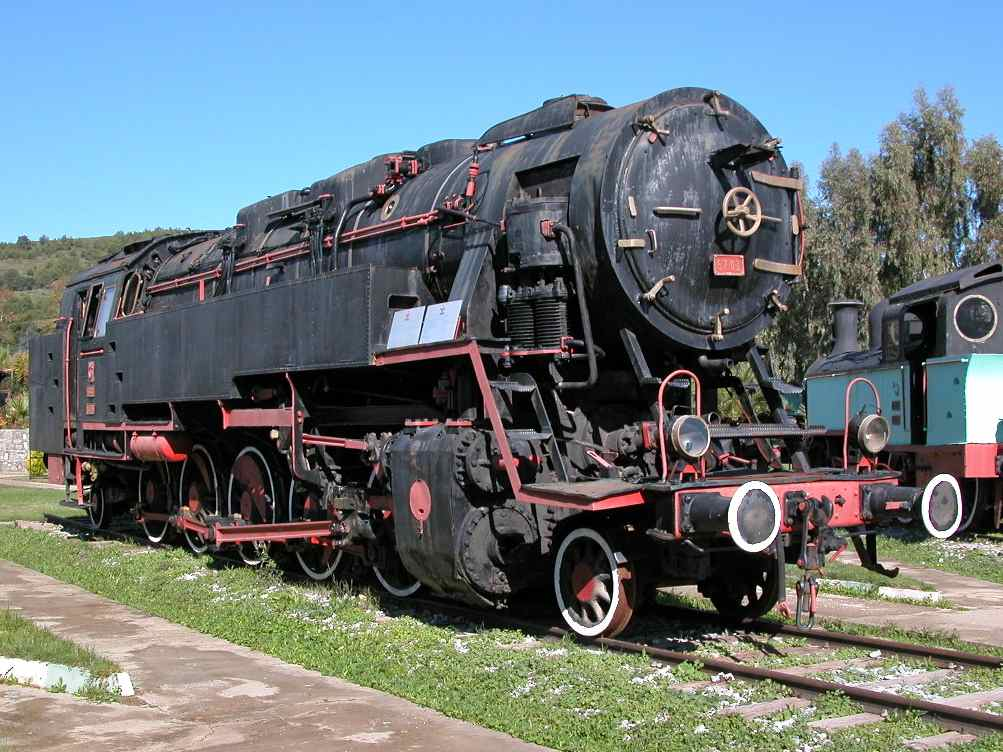
- 5701 at the Çamlık Railway Museum

- Location within Turkey
- Established: 1997
- Location: Çamlık Village, Selçuk, İzmir Province, Turkey
- Coordinates: 37.88522°N 27.38057°E
- Type: Railway museum
- Collection size: 33 steam locomotives, 9 passenger cars; 7 freight cars; other rolling stock
- Director: Atilla Mısırlıoğlu
- Public transit access: Private buses between Selçuk and Çamlık or TCDD regional trains

The Çamlık Railway Museum, also known as Çamlık Steam Locomotive Museum (Turkish: Çamlık Tren Müzesi or Çamlık Buharlı Lokomotif Müzesi), is an outdoor railway museum at Çamlık village of Selçuk district in İzmir Province, Turkey. It is the largest railway museum in Turkey and contains one of the largest steam locomotive collections in Europe.

== History ==
The museum is located on a former part of the ORC mainline, the oldest line in Turkey, near the village Çamlık, very close to the historical site at Ephesus. When the tracks on the İzmir–Aydın main line were realigned, a small portion of the line, as well as the original Çamlık railway station, were abandoned. The museum was started in 1991, and completed in 1997. It uses the original tracks built in 1866.

While the land, the buildings and the collection are all the property of the Turkish State Railways (TCDD), the museum is run by Atilla Mısırlıoğlu on a 99-year lease. He is the son of the first signalman serving at the Çamlık railway station.

== Museum ==
In the museum, there are 33 steam locomotives displayed outside, half of them arrayed around an 18-road turntable. The manufacturing years of the locomotives range from 1891 to 1951. The oldest one is built by Robert Stephenson & Company, England. The steam engines on display were made by: Henschel (8), Maffei (2), Borsig (1), BMAG (2), MBA (1), Krupp (3), Humboldt (1) from Germany; NOHAB (2) from Sweden; ČKD (1) from Czechoslovakia; Robert Stephenson & Company (2), North British Locomotive Company (1), Beyer, Peacock & Company (1) from the UK; Lima Locomotive Works (1), ALCO (1), Vulcan Iron Works (1) from the USA; and Creusot (1), Batignolles (1), Corpet-Louvet (2) from France. Visitors may climb up into the engines. The locomotives are provided with plaques giving information about technical details.

The steam locomotive number 45501, which was involved in the Yarımburgaz train disaster as part of the Orient Express, is exhibited in the museum. The head-on collision in 1957, with its death toll of 95, is the deadliest train accident in Turkey as of 2010.

The museum has nine passenger cars including two wooden cars. The salon car used by Mustafa Kemal Atatürk (1881-1938) can be visited inside. There are also seven freight cars on display. In addition to various rolling stock, there are many railway and rail station utilities at the facility such as a water tower, road turntable, hand lorry and crane.

== See also ==
- History of rail transport in Turkey
- TCDD Open Air Steam Locomotive Museum in Ankara
- Istanbul Railway Museum
- Atatürk's Residence and Railway Museum in Ankara
