= Park-to-reverse =

Vehicular accident

A park-to-reverse defect is a scenario in which cars with automatic transmission can fail to properly engage the parking mechanism, causing the vehicle to unintentionally roll, sometimes resulting in injury or vehicular accidents. This has significance in product liability law, and a number of major cases in the United States have been brought in which car manufacturers were accused of negligence for not addressing an alleged dangerous flaw in the transmission.

A park-to-reverse situation involves a driver who believes that they have shifted into "park" and believing so, proceeds to exit the vehicle. There can then be a delay in vehicle movement sufficient for the driver to either fully or partially exit the vehicle before the vehicle moves. Typically, the vehicle will move backwards. However, when on certain vehicles the shift selector can be placed between the detented park and reverse gear positions, i.e. in false park, the transmission is in hydraulic neutral, without the parking pawl engaged. As such the vehicle can also roll either forward or back in neutral. While less common, transmissions with the defect can also be shifted to between "neutral" and "drive", and then self shift into "drive" or roll (called a "neutral to drive" accident).

Park-to-Reverse issues are nearly always caused by several possible design flaws in a vehicle's transmission which makes it possible for a driver to unknowingly place the vehicle's shift selector into a position in between the "park" and "reverse" gear positions. Yet rather than being in "park', this area is a transitional zone between gears, which is sometimes called "false park".

When a vehicle's transmission is in false park, it may appear to the driver that the vehicle is fully locked in "park". However, on vehicles with this defect the transmission is neither in park nor in hydraulic reverse. Instead, it is in neutral, an unstable position between the two gears.

== Risks ==
From this false park position, slight movements in the vehicle, vibration, or the build up of hydraulic pressure in the transmission can then cause the vehicle to reengage powered reverse after a delay from a few seconds to longer periods of time (what is called a "self shift"). This will cause the vehicle to suddenly and without warning move backwards unexpectedly under engine power.

If the driver has exited the vehicle with the engine running (to for example retrieve an item, open a gate or close a garage door, etc.), a vehicle in false park can shift into powered reverse from a few seconds to several minutes or longer, after the driver has exited, and then run over the driver or a bystander.

== NHTSA ==
NHTSA (National Highway Traffic Safety Administration) refers to the "Park to Reverse" issue using various terms including "Unintended Powered Roll-Away" and has opened numerous investigations of these events over the last 35 years.

== Mechanical cause ==
With some automatic transmissions, it was possible to place the shift selector at any point, either in an intended gear or between a gear. Because of the possible safety issue of this, and because driving a vehicle not fully in a gear over a long period of time could damage the transmission, automakers developed what is called the "detent system." The system of detents was often used in conjunction with the "push button" shifters used on many automatics in the 1950s. Typical detent systems use either a detent spring and ball or a cantilever spring and this spring moves up and down over a series of teethed gears (called a "rooster comb" for how it looks, or an "inner manuel lever") turning the rooster comb to fine center the transmission in the intended gear position at the bottom of each gear.

However, if the spring is too weak to always move the rooster comb to the bottom of the trough between the teeth, the vehicle can be left between gears. On certain U.S. car manufacturers' vehicles, the problem is made worse as there is a flat spot between "Park" and "Reverse" detents where the ball can rest, also resulting in a "false park".

== Park to reverse lawsuits ==
=== Mraz v. DaimlerChrysler (2007) ===
A case involving the death of a Los Angeles dockworker killed by a park-to-reverse defect in a Dodge Dakota. The jury returned a verdict of $55.2 million, including $50 million in punitive damages. California Lawyer Attorney of the Year (CLAY) Award called the Mraz victory against DaimlerChrysler "one of the year's largest personal injury verdicts", and noted that "this was the first park-to-reverse case against Chrysler in 25 years to make it to trial."”

=== Guillot v. Chrysler (2008) ===
A case against Chrysler for the death of an infant due to the park-to-reverse defect. The case resulted in a $7.2 million verdict in St. Bernard Parish, Louisiana.

=== Mundy v. Ford Motor Company and Legacy Ford Mercury, Inc. (2009) ===
A case which was centered Jessica Mundy becoming paralyzed as a result of her Ford Explorer going into false-park. The verdict concluded that $40 million be paid by the defendants. $30 million of the verdict was attributed to punitive damages.
