= Flat-four engine =

Horizontally opposed four-cylinder piston engine

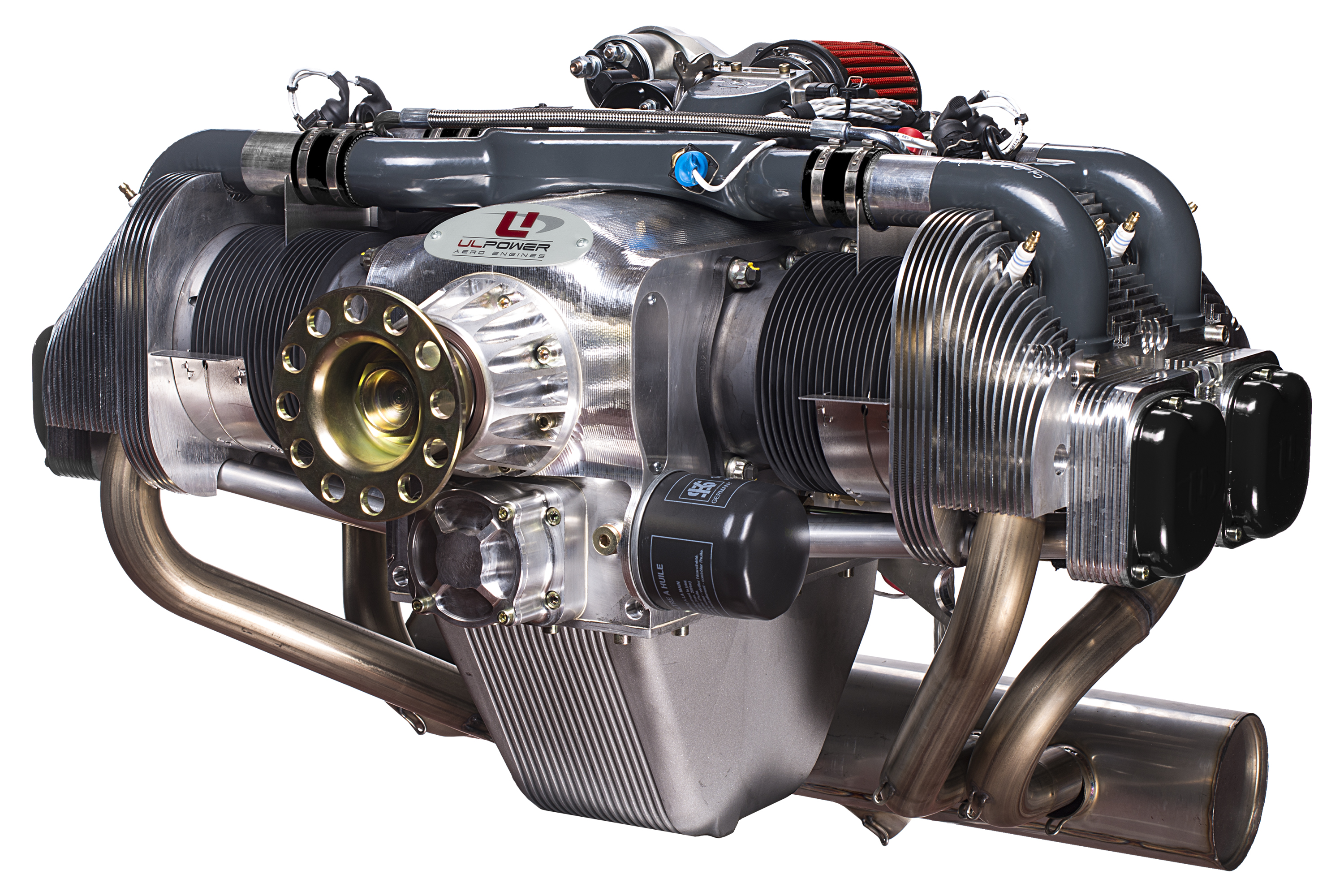
ULPower UL360iS aircraft piston engine

A flat-four engine (also known as a horizontally opposed-four engine or boxer engine) is a four-cylinder piston engine with two banks of cylinders lying on opposite sides of a common crankshaft. The most common type of flat-four engine is the boxer-four engine, each pair of opposed pistons moves inwards and outwards at the same time.

A boxer-four engine has perfect primary and secondary balance, however, the two cylinder heads means the design is more expensive to produce than a straight-four engine. There is a minor, secondary unbalanced rotational torque pulse in the plane of the pistons, when a piston pair at one end of the engine is at TDC and the other pair at BDC. The TDC pair creates a torque greater than the BDC pair, so the net unbalanced torque pulse is the difference. The difference in TDC vs BDC inertial forces is explained in the Engine balance section. Boxer-four engines have been used in cars since 1900, especially by Volkswagen and Subaru. They have also occasionally been used in motorcycles and frequently in aircraft. Cessna and Piper use flat four engines from Lycoming and Continental in the most common civil aircraft in the world - the Cessna 172, and Piper Cherokee, while many ultralight and LSA planes use versions of the Rotax 912.

== Design ==
Boxer-four animation

In a flat-four engine, each pair of opposing pistons successively moves inwards together and outwards together. The advantages of the boxer-four layout are perfect secondary vibration (resulting in minimal vibration), a low centre of gravity, and a short engine length. Flat-four engine have successfully used air cooling, although air-cooled engines are noisier and have a lower power output than an equivalent engine with liquid cooling. In light aircraft, where lightness is of primary importance, air-cooling has traditionally been common.

The downsides of boxer-four engines (compared with inline-four engines) are their extra width, the increased costs associated with having two cylinder heads instead of one, and the long exhaust manifold required to achieve evenly spaced exhaust pulses. Due to these factors, straight-four engines are more common in cars than are flat-four engines, and V6 engines are often used where larger displacements are required.

=== Engine balance ===
The equal and opposing forces generated in a boxer-four engine result in perfect secondary balance (unlike the unbalanced vertical forces produced by inline-four engines). Boxer-four engines are therefore better suited to displacements above 2.0 L (122 cu in), since they do not require balance shafts to reduce the secondary vibration.

In a boxer engine, each cylinder is slightly offset from its opposing pair due to the distance between the crankpin journals. This offset gives rise to a slight rocking couple, but unlike a boxer twin's single primary rocking couple, the boxer-four has two opposing cylinder pairs that lead to opposed primary rocking couples that cancel each other out. This leaves a secondary rocking couple that doesn't impart enough vibration into the system to require balance shafts.

As with all four-stroke engines of four cylinders or fewer, the lack of overlap in the power strokes results in a pulsating delivery of torque to the flywheel, causing a torsional vibration along the crankshaft axis. Such vibration, if excessive, may be minimised using a harmonic damper.

=== Exhaust manifold ===
The typical firing order for a boxer-four engine is for the left bank of cylinders to ignite one after another, followed by the right bank of cylinders (or vice versa), with the firing interval evenly spaced at 180 degrees. Traditionally, the exhausts from the two cylinders on each bank were merged, with the resulting uneven exhaust pulses causing a characteristic "flat-four burble" exhaust sound.

The other common exhaust configuration (such as used by Subaru since the mid-2000s) is to pair the cylinders with a firing interval offset of 360 degrees, in order to optimise the exhaust pulses. This configuration requires long exhaust manifolds, in order to pair the cylinders on opposite banks, and results in a less distinctive exhaust sound.

== Use in automobiles ==
=== 1900–1935 ===
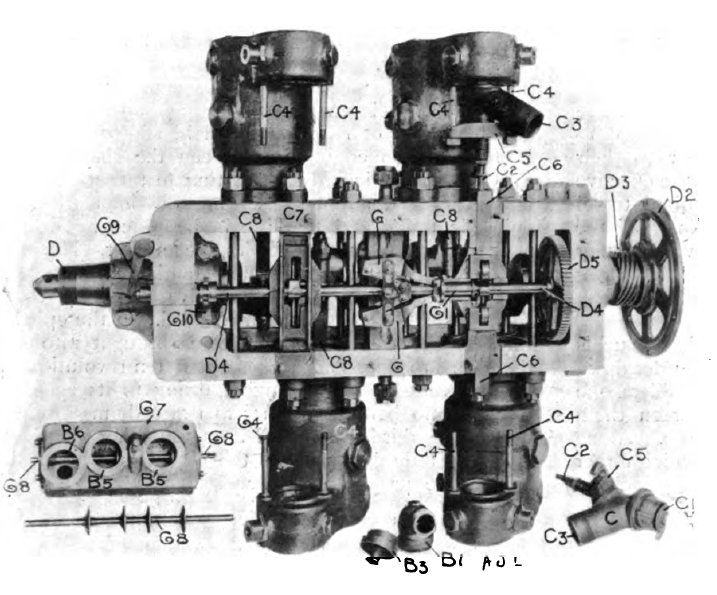
1904 Wilson-Pilcher water-cooled engine

In 1900, the first flat-four engine was produced by Benz & Cie, based on Benz's 1897 "contra" flat-twin engine. This engine was used in Benz racing cars, produced 20 hp (15 kW), had a displacement of 5.4 L (330 cu in) and was designed by Georg Diehl.

London company Wilson-Pilcher released its first car in 1901, which was powered by a flat-four engine. This engine was mounted longitudinally in the chassis, water-cooled, produced 9 hp (7 kW) and had a displacement of 2.4 L (146 cu in). Unusually for its day, the bore and stroke were equal, with each being 95 mm (3.7 in).

In 1902 the Buffum automobile was equipped with opposed four cylinder engines that were rated at 16 horsepower. Herbert H. Buffum produced an American Automobile called the Buffum in Abington, Massachusetts from 1903 to 1907.

Having previously produced flat-twin engines, the 1926 Tatra 30 was the Czech company's first model powered by a flat-four engine. Tatra produced various flat-four engined model through the 1920s and 1930s.

=== 1936–1999 ===
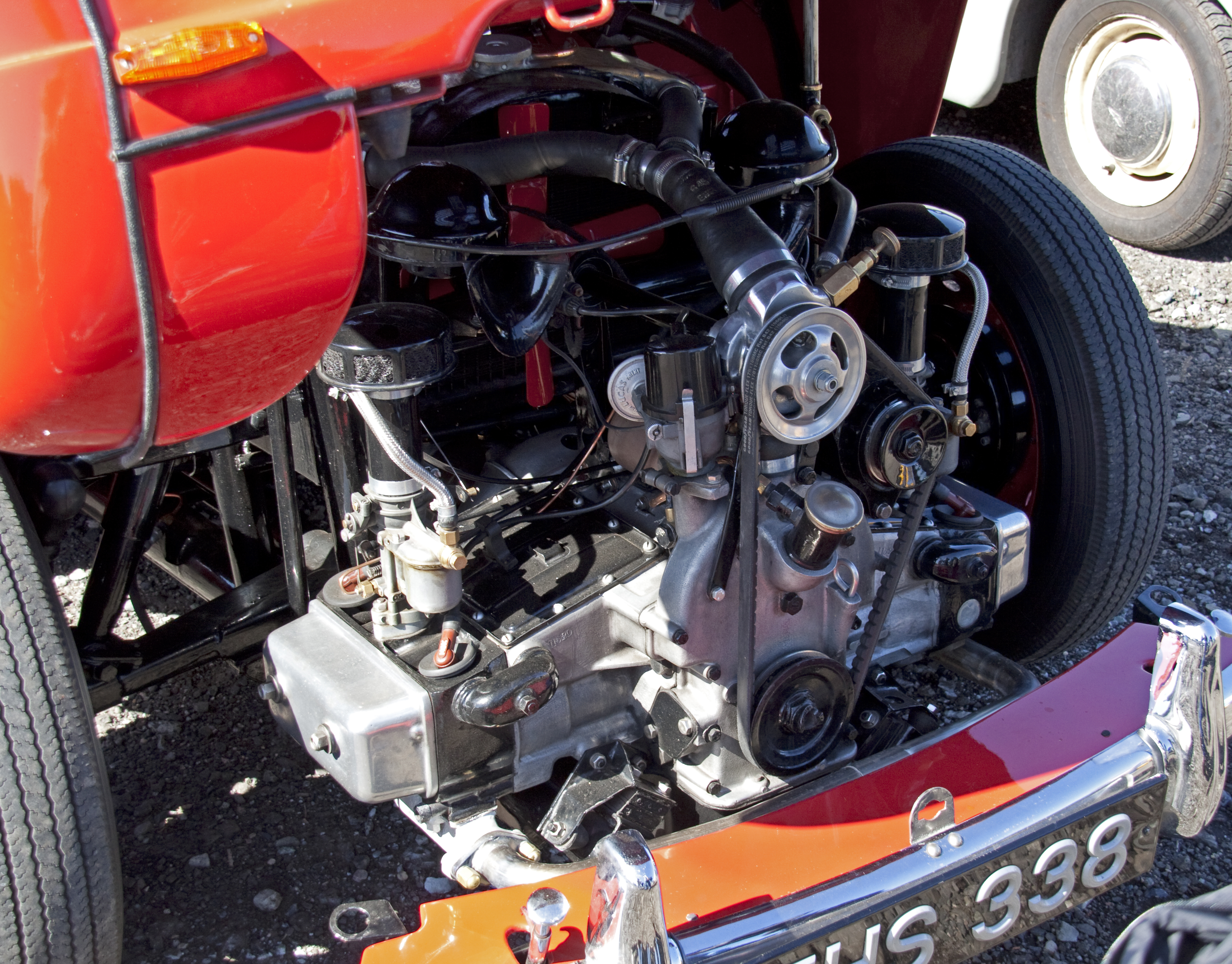
1952 Jowett Jupiter water-cooled engine

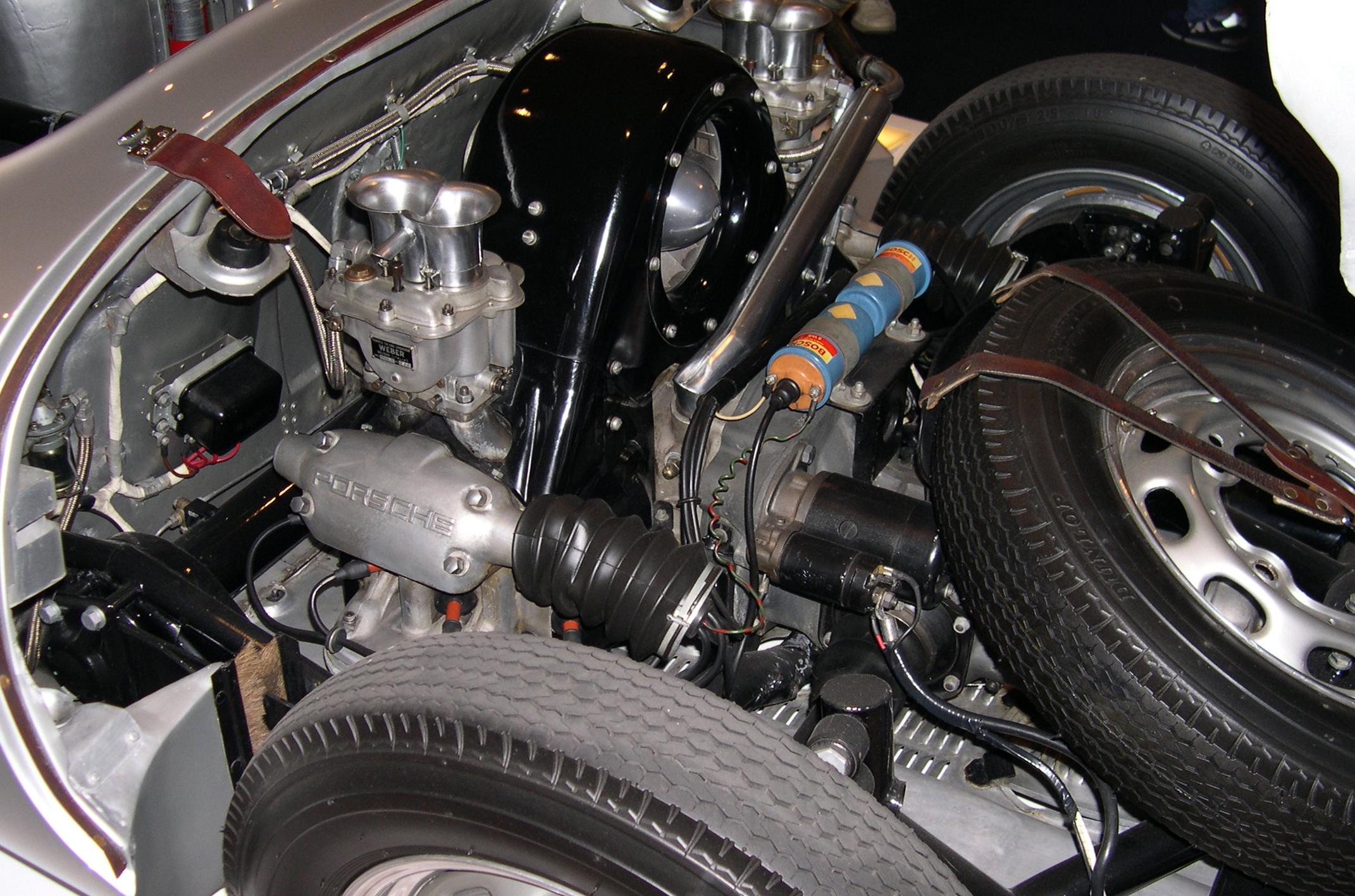
1955 Porsche 550 Spyder air-cooled engine

The 1936 Tatra T97 pioneered the rear-engined, air-cooled flat-four, backbone chassis layout (later used by the Volkswagen Beetle), and at the same time, though unrelated, came the Steyr 50 from Austria, sporting a front boxer 4 engine with rear wheel drive. Also in 1936, English company Jowett expanded its model range from flat-twin engines to also include flat-four engines. Production of Jowett flat-four engines continued until 1954, when the Jowett Javelin saloon and Jowett Jupiter sports models ended production.

The longest production flat-four engine is the Volkswagen air-cooled engine, which was produced from 1938 until 2006 and was most famously used in the rear-engined 1938–2003 Volkswagen Beetle and 1950–1983 Volkswagen Transporter. This air-cooled engine was designed by Porsche and was also used in the 1948–1965 Porsche 356, 1953–1956 Porsche 550, 1965–1969 Porsche 912 and 1969–1976 Porsche 914. In 1984, to comply with exhaust emissions regulations a water-cooled version called the Volkswagen Wasserboxer engine was introduced in the Volkswagen Transporter (T3)

During the 1960s and 1970s, several manufacturers produced flat-four engines including the air-cooled Citroën flat-four engine, the water-cooled Alfa Romeo flat-four engine, the water-cooled Lancia flat-four engine and the water-cooled Subaru EA engine.

Two important engines designed during this period, but never saw the light of day in series production, were the Morris 800cc side valve engine by Alec Issigonis in 1947 originally destined for the Morris Minor, and the Ferguson 2.2 litre SOHC engine by Claude Hill in 1966 as part of the R5 vehicle research project.

=== 2000–present ===
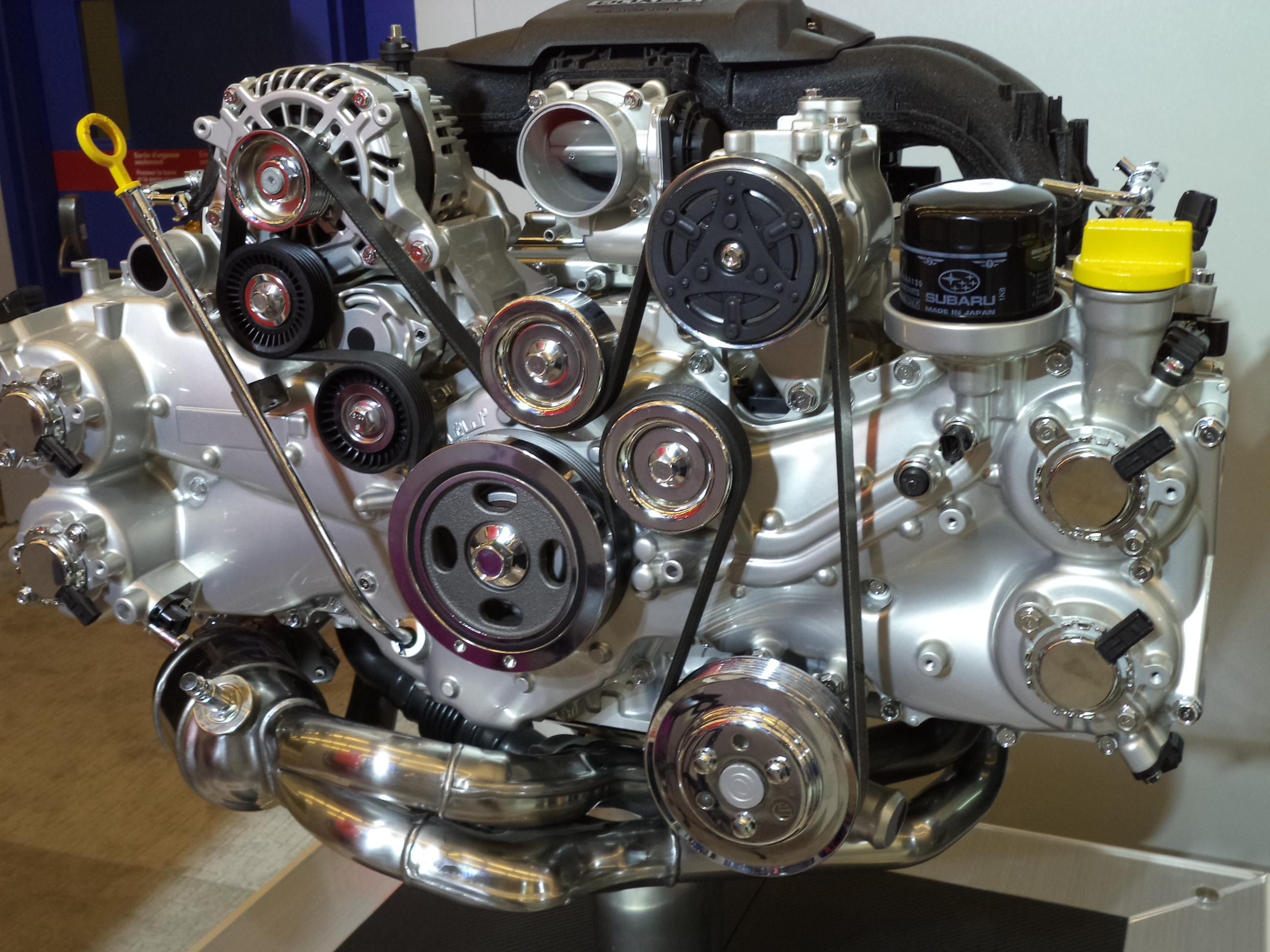
2012–present Subaru FA water-cooled engine

By 2000, most manufacturers had replaced flat-four engines with inline-four engines. A notable exception is Subaru, with the water-cooled Subaru EJ engine being available in turbocharged form in the Subaru WRX sports sedan and its World Rally Car counterpart. Subaru's adoption of all-wheel drive was a factor in retaining the flat-four engine, since the shorter length of this engine assists in fitting the all-wheel drive components into the chassis. Although it is more expensive than an inline-four engine, the flat-four engine allows Subaru to build an all-wheel drive vehicle at little extra cost from two-wheel drive.

In 2012, a naturally aspirated version of the Subaru FA engine was used in the Toyota 86 (also called the "Subaru BRZ" and "Scion FR-S") rear-wheel drive sports coupe. This engine is water-cooled, has gasoline direct injection, produces 147 kW (197 hp) and has a displacement of 2.0 L (122 cu in).

The 2016 Porsche Boxster/Cayman (982) mid-engined sports cars downsized from a naturally aspirated flat-six engine to a turbocharged flat-four engine, Porsche's first flat-four since the mid-1970s. This engine is produced in displacements of 2.0–2.5 L (122–153 cu in) and produces up to 365 hp (272 kW). Several reviewers criticised the Boxster/Cayman for an uninspiring engine sound.

In 2025, Chinese automaker BYD Auto introduced its first flat-four engine in the Yangwang U7 luxury sedan, marking a modern revival of the boxer engine layout. This water-cooled, turbocharged powerplant combined direct injection and hybrid technology, delivering 268 hp (200 kW) while maintaining a compact design ideal for the sedan’s all-wheel-drive system. The engine drew inspiration from Porsche’s turbocharged flat-four units and showcased BYD’s push into high-performance powertrains alongside its electric vehicle lineup.

== Use in motorcycles ==
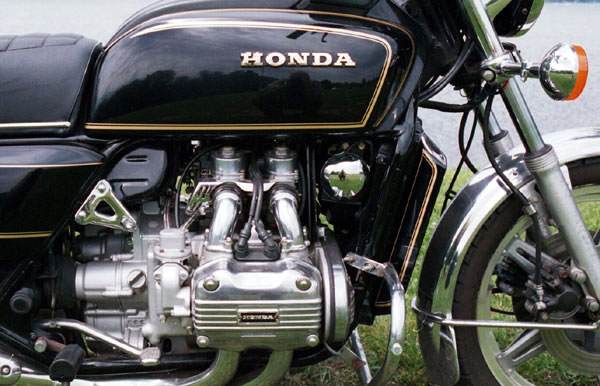
Honda GL1000

Most motorcycles with four-cylinder engines use a straight-four engine layout (most are flat plane, except Yamaha R1/R1M having crossplane), however, several flat-four engine engines have been used in shaft drive motorcycles:

- 1938–1939 Zündapp K800 (air-cooled)
- 1974–1987 Honda Gold Wing (liquid-cooled)
- 1955–1956 Wooler 500cc (air-cooled)
- 1981–1982 BFG 1300, using the air-cooled Citroën flat-four car engine. Approximately 450 were built, with one quarter of these purchased by the French police.

== Use in aircraft ==
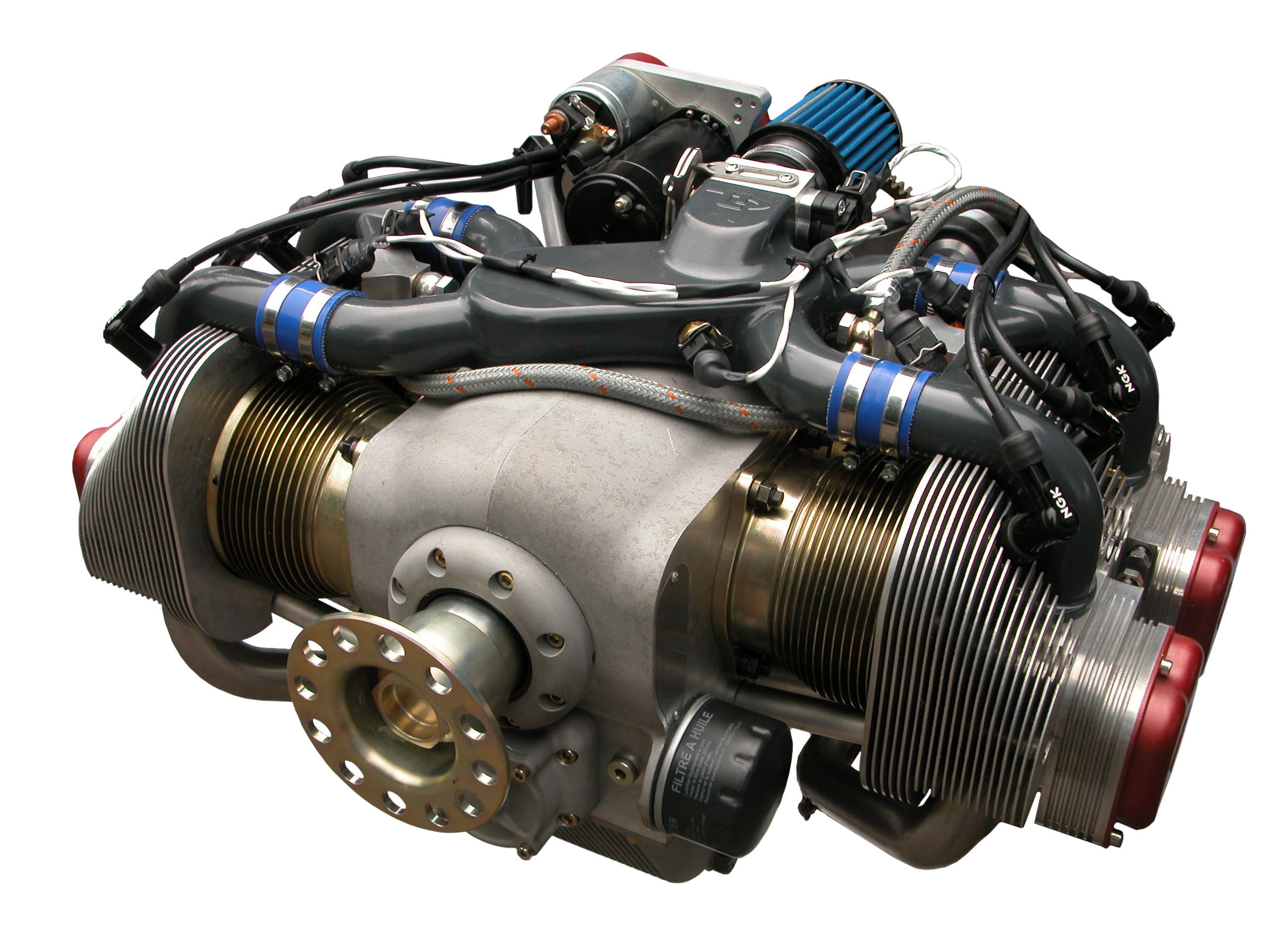
ULPower UL260i aircraft engine

Light aircraft commonly use flat-four engines with displacements up to 6.4 L (390 cu in) from manufacturers such as Rotax, Lycoming Engines, Continental Motors and Franklin Engine Company.

For radio-controlled aircraft, flat-four engines with displacements of 40–50 cc (2.4–3.1 cu in) are produced by companies such as O.S. Engines.

A notable recent flat-four aero-engine is the side-valve Belgian D-Motor LF26. Although the side-valve format has long been abandoned for most automotive applications because its combustion chamber is a bar to high engine rpm, the massively over-square (1.295:1) D-Motor is a very simple, low-revving, compact, reliable lightweight aero-engine (without the heavy complication of ohv valve-gear)

== See also ==
- Straight-four engine
- V4 engine
