= TCDD HSL700 =

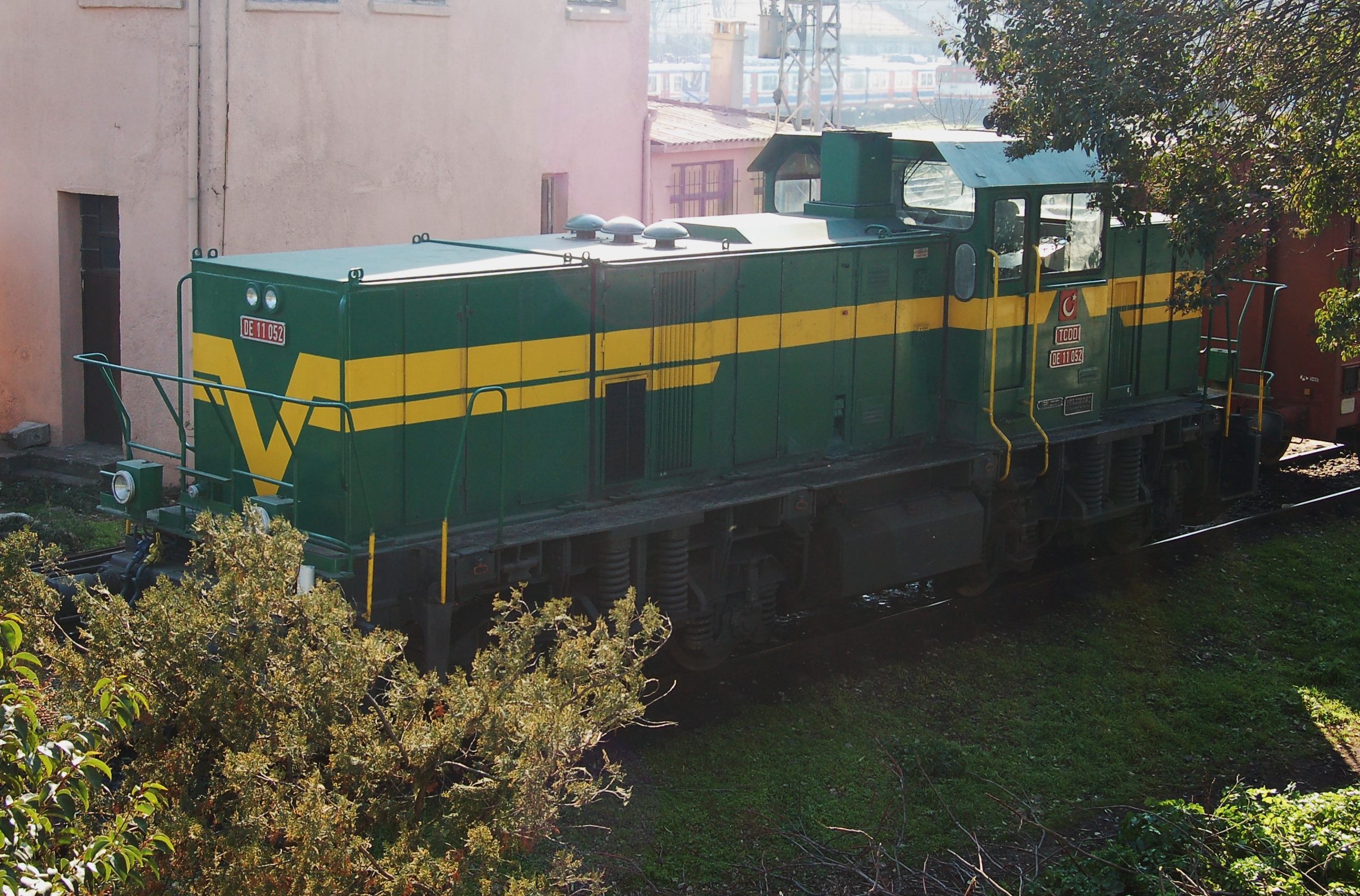
- TCDD DE11052 at Sirkeci, Istanbul
Type and origin
- Power type: Electro-diesel
- Builder: TÜLOMSAŞ
- Build date: 2018
Specifications
- Configuration
  - AAR: B-B
  - UIC: Bo'Bo'
- Gauge: 1,435 mm (4 ft 8 1/2 in)
- Bogies: 2
- Length: 13.25 m (43 ft 6 in)
- Loco weight: 68 tonnes (67 long tons; 75 short tons)
- Fuel capacity: 2,700 litres (590 imp gal; 710 US gal)
- Prime mover: Cummins K15
- Engine type: Diesel
- Aspiration: Turbocharged
- Cylinders: Inline 6
- Transmission: AC-DC-AC (Diesel-sourced power); DC-AC (Battery sourced power)
- Loco brake: Air, Parking pawl, Regenative brake
- Train brakes: Air
- Safety systems: Dead man's switch
Performance figures
- Maximum speed: 80 km/h (50 mph)
- Power output: 300 kW (400 hp) by Diesel; 400 kilowatts (540 hp) by batteries
- Tractive effort: 220 kN (49,000 lbf) (Note: with combined power)
Career
- Operators: TCDD Taşımacılık
- Numbers: TBA
- Locale: Turkey

TCDD HSL700 is a series of electro-diesel locomotives used by the Turkish State Railways, built by Tülomsaş. The units have Bo'Bo' wheel arrangement and are powered by 300 kW engine and/or 400kW Li-ion batteries.
