= Shift-by-wire =

Automotive transmission system

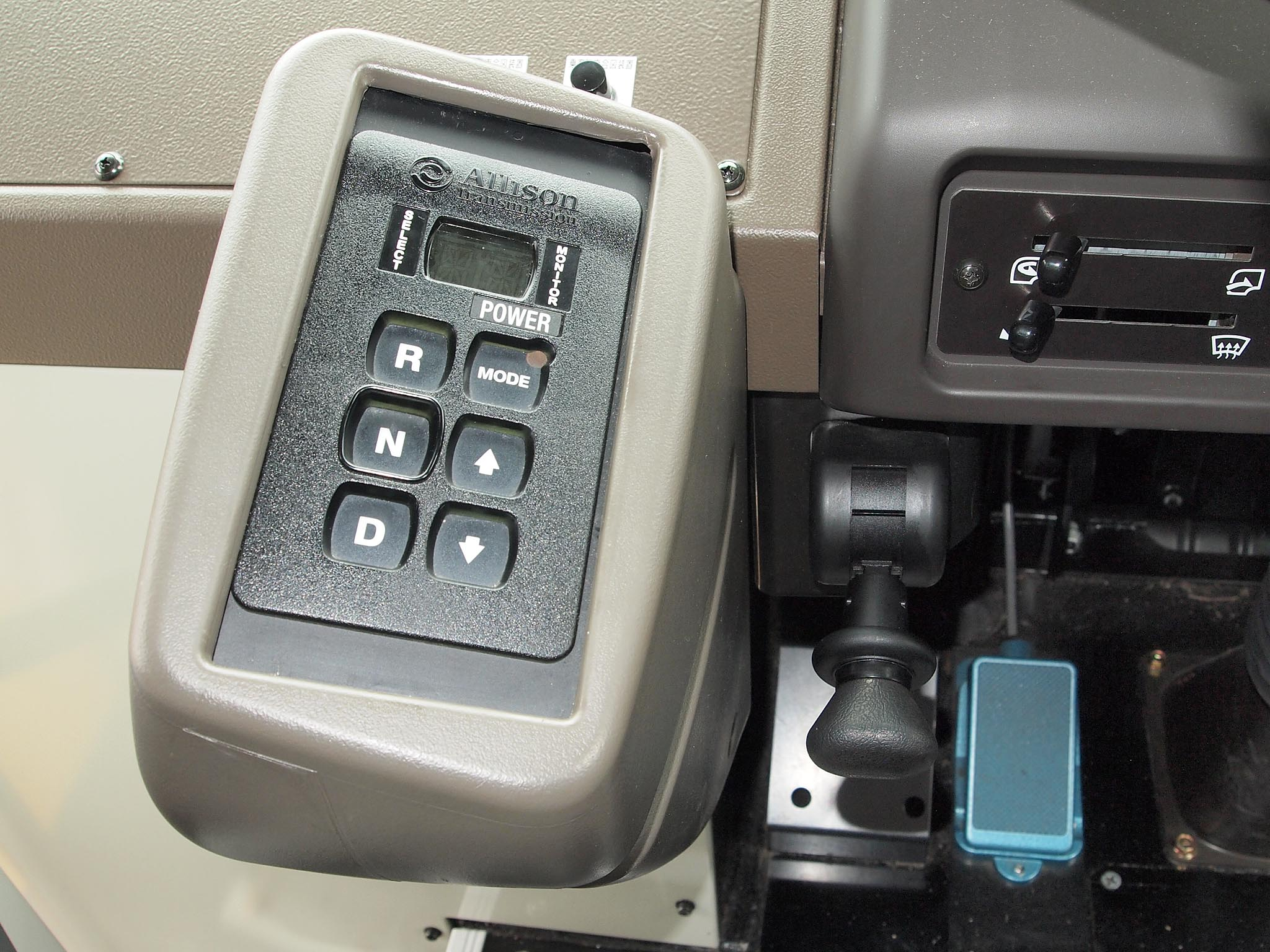
A commercial push-button-based electronic shift selector made by Allison Transmission

Shift-by-wire is an automotive concept or system that employs electrical or electronic connections that replace the mechanical connection between the driver's gearshift mechanism and the transmission. Since becoming commercially available in 1996, shift-by-wire has been commonly used in automated manual transmission and has later been implemented in semi-automatic transmission and automatic transmission.

Dispensing with gearshift mechanical linkages has several advantages: it reduces complexity and simplifies assembly; reduces the force required to shift gears and allows it to be customized with haptic technology; allows for more interior design freedom in the placement of the gearshift mechanism; allows for automation of the engagement of the parking brake and other functions; reduces cabin noise by eliminating the acoustic linkage between the transmission and the gear shift; and by reducing floor openings it improves the crash behavior of the vehicle.

With a mechanical connection, the gearshift selector always matches the engaged transmission gear. With shift-by-wire, safety mechanisms need to be put in place. The system needs to block incorrect input and "guide" the gearshift back to a position that matches the state of the transmission in case of error. Another solution is to separate the gearshift selector from the gear indicator, meaning the driver has to visually monitor which gear is actually engaged, for instance on a display. Safety considerations require redundancy in the gearshift and transmission sensors and in the vehicle communication network.

== Park by wire ==
A park by wire system engages the parking pawl of a transmission using electrical means, without the traditional mechanical system which involves linkages between the gear shifter and the transmission. Park-by-wire can be considered a part of a shift by wire system, as it shifts the transmission into park mode. The main components of a park by wire system include the driver interface which could be a lever, switch, or knob; an electronic control unit; and actuators which are capable of driving the parking pawl into and out of the locking position with the parking gear of the transmission.

== See also ==
- Drive by wire
- Unsafe at Any Speed § Disaster deferred
