= Automatic transmission =

Type of motor vehicle transmission

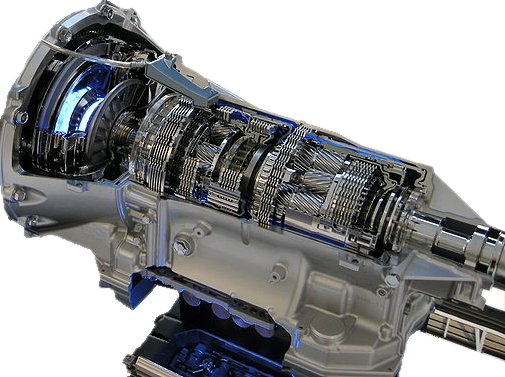
Cutaway view of a 2007 Toyota AA80E hydraulic automatic

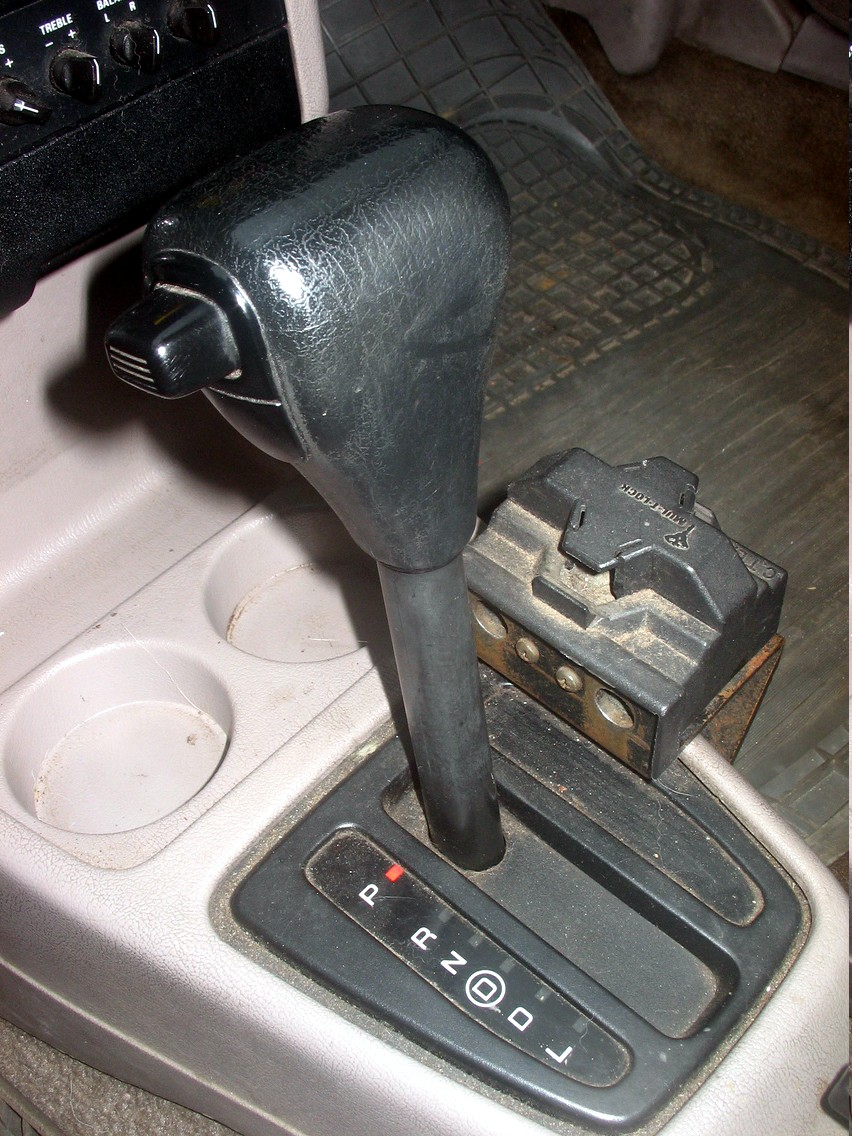
Gear selector of a 1992 Ford Escort with automatic transmission

An automatic transmission (AT) or automatic gearbox is a multi-speed transmission used in motor vehicles.

The 1904 Sturtevant "horseless carriage gearbox" is often considered to be the first true automatic transmission. The first mass-produced automatic transmission was General Motors' Hydra-Matic, introduced in Oldsmobile models for the 1940 model year.

Automatic transmissions are especially prevalent in vehicular drivetrains, particularly those subject to intense mechanical acceleration and frequent idle/transient operating conditions; commonly commercial/passenger/utility vehicles, such as buses and waste collection vehicles.

== Prevalence ==
Vehicles with internal combustion engines, unlike electric vehicles, require the engine to operate in a narrow range of rates of rotation, requiring a gearbox, operated manually or automatically, to drive the wheels over a wide range of speeds.

Globally, 43% of new cars produced in 2015 were manual transmissions, falling to 37% by 2020. Automatic transmissions have long been prevalent in the United States, but only started to become common in Europe much later. In Europe in 1997, only 10–12% of cars had automatic transmissions.

In 1957 over 80% of new cars in the United States had automatic transmissions. Automatic transmissions have been standard in large cars since at least 1974. By 2020 only 2.4% of new cars had manual transmissions. Historically, automatic transmissions were less efficient, but lower fuel prices in the US made this less of a problem than in Europe.

In the United Kingdom, a majority of new cars have had automatic transmissions since 2020. Several manufacturers including Mercedes and Volvo no longer sell cars with manual transmissions. The growing prevalence of automatic transmissions is attributed to the increasing number of electric and hybrid cars, and the ease of integrating it with safety systems such as Autonomous Emergency Braking.

== Efficiency ==
The efficiency (power output as a percentage of input) of conventional automatic transmissions ranges from 86 to 94%. Manual transmissions are more fuel efficient than all but the newest automatic transmissions due to their inherently low parasitic losses (typically of about 4%) in addition to being cheaper to make, lighter, better performing, and of simpler mechanical design. Fuel economy worsens with lower efficiency. However, manual transmissions require the driver to operate the clutch and change gear whenever required.

Real-world tests reported in 2022 found that in typical driving manual transmissions achieved 2 to 5% better fuel economy than automatics, increasing to 20% with an expert driver. Some laboratory tests show automatics in a better light due to the tests using a prescribed shifting pattern for manuals not always optimized for economy. However, on long highway journeys manual transmissions require maintaining a very specific cruising speed to optimise economy, making automatics preferable.

== Hydraulic automatic transmission ==
=== Design ===
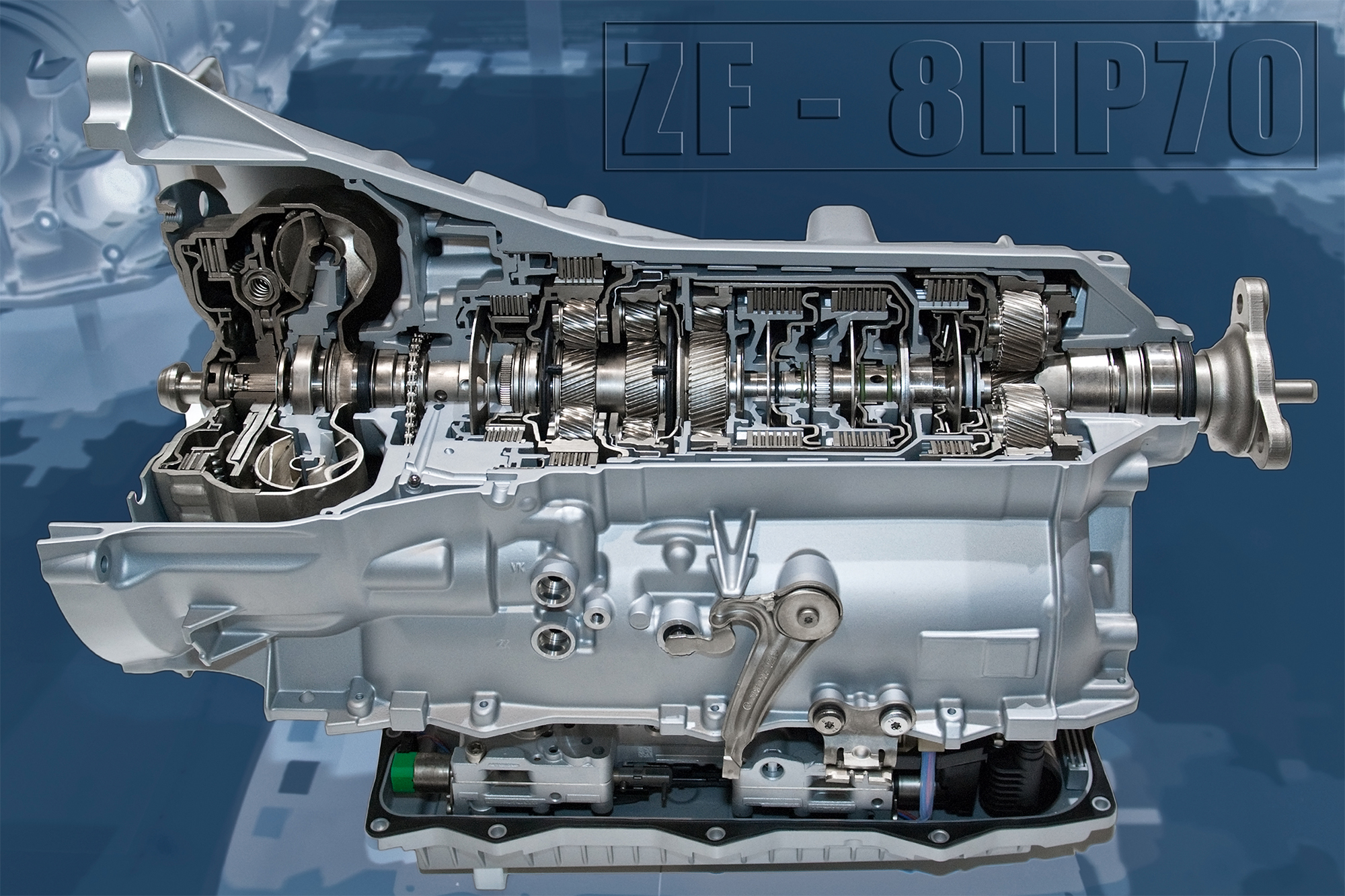
Cutaway view of a ZF 8HP transmission: torque converter on the left, planetary gearsets in the centre, control mechanisms at the bottom

The most common design of automatic transmissions is the hydraulic automatic, which typically uses planetary gearsets that are operated using hydraulics. The transmission is connected to the engine via a torque converter (or a fluid coupling prior to the 1960s), instead of the friction clutch used by most manual transmissions.

==== Gearsets and shifting mechanism ====
A hydraulic automatic transmission uses planetary gearsets instead of the manual transmission's design of gears lined up along input, output and intermediate shafts. To change gears, the hydraulic automatic uses a combination of internal clutches, friction bands or brake packs. These devices are used to lock certain gears, thus setting which gear ratio is in use at a given time.

A sprag clutch (a ratchet-like device which can freewheel and transmits torque in only one direction) is often used for routine gear shifts. The advantage of a sprag clutch is that it eliminates the sensitivity of timing a simultaneous clutch release/apply on two planetary gearsets, simply "taking up" the drivetrain load when actuated, and releasing automatically when the next gear's sprag clutch assumes the torque transfer.

The friction bands are often used for manually selected gears (such as low range or reverse) and operate on the planetary drum's circumference. Bands are not applied when the drive/overdrive range is selected, the torque being transmitted by the sprag clutches instead.

==== Hydraulic controls ====
The aforementioned friction bands and clutches are controlled using automatic transmission fluid (ATF), which is pressurized by a pump and then directed to the appropriate bands/clutches to obtain the required gear ratio. The ATF provides lubrication, corrosion prevention, and a hydraulic medium to transmit the power required to operate the transmission. Made from petroleum with various refinements and additives, ATF is one of the few parts of the automatic transmission that needs routine service as the vehicle ages.

The main pump which pressurises the ATF is typically a gear pump mounted between the torque converter and the planetary gear set. The input for the main pump is connected to the torque converter housing, which in turn is bolted to the engine's flexplate, so the pump provides pressure whenever the engine is running. A disadvantage of this arrangement is that there is no oil pressure to operate the transmission when the engine is not running, therefore it is not possible to push start a vehicle equipped with an automatic transmission with no rear pump (aside from several automatics built prior to 1970, which also included a rear pump for towing and push-starting purposes). The pressure of the ATF is regulated by a governor connected to the output shaft, which varies the pressure depending on the vehicle speed.

The valve body inside the transmission is responsible for directing hydraulic pressure to the appropriate bands and clutches. It receives pressurized fluid from the main pump and consists of several spring-loaded valves, check balls, and servo pistons. In older automatic transmissions, the valves use the pump pressure and the pressure from a centrifugal governor on the output side (as well as other inputs, such as throttle position or the driver locking out the higher gears) to control which ratio is selected. As the vehicle and engine change speed, the difference between the pressures changes, causing different sets of valves to open and close. In more recent automatic transmissions, the valves are controlled by solenoids. These solenoids are computer-controlled, with the gear selection decided by a dedicated transmission control unit (TCU) or sometimes this function is integrated into the engine control unit (ECU). Modern designs have replaced the centrifugal governor with an electronic speed sensor that is used as an input to the TCU or ECU. Modern transmissions also factor in the amount of load on an engine at any given time, which is determined from either the throttle position or the amount of intake manifold vacuum.

The multitude of parts, along with the complex design of the valve body, originally made hydraulic automatic transmissions much more expensive and time-consuming to build and repair than manual transmissions; however mass-production and developments over time have reduced this cost gap.

==== Torque converter ====
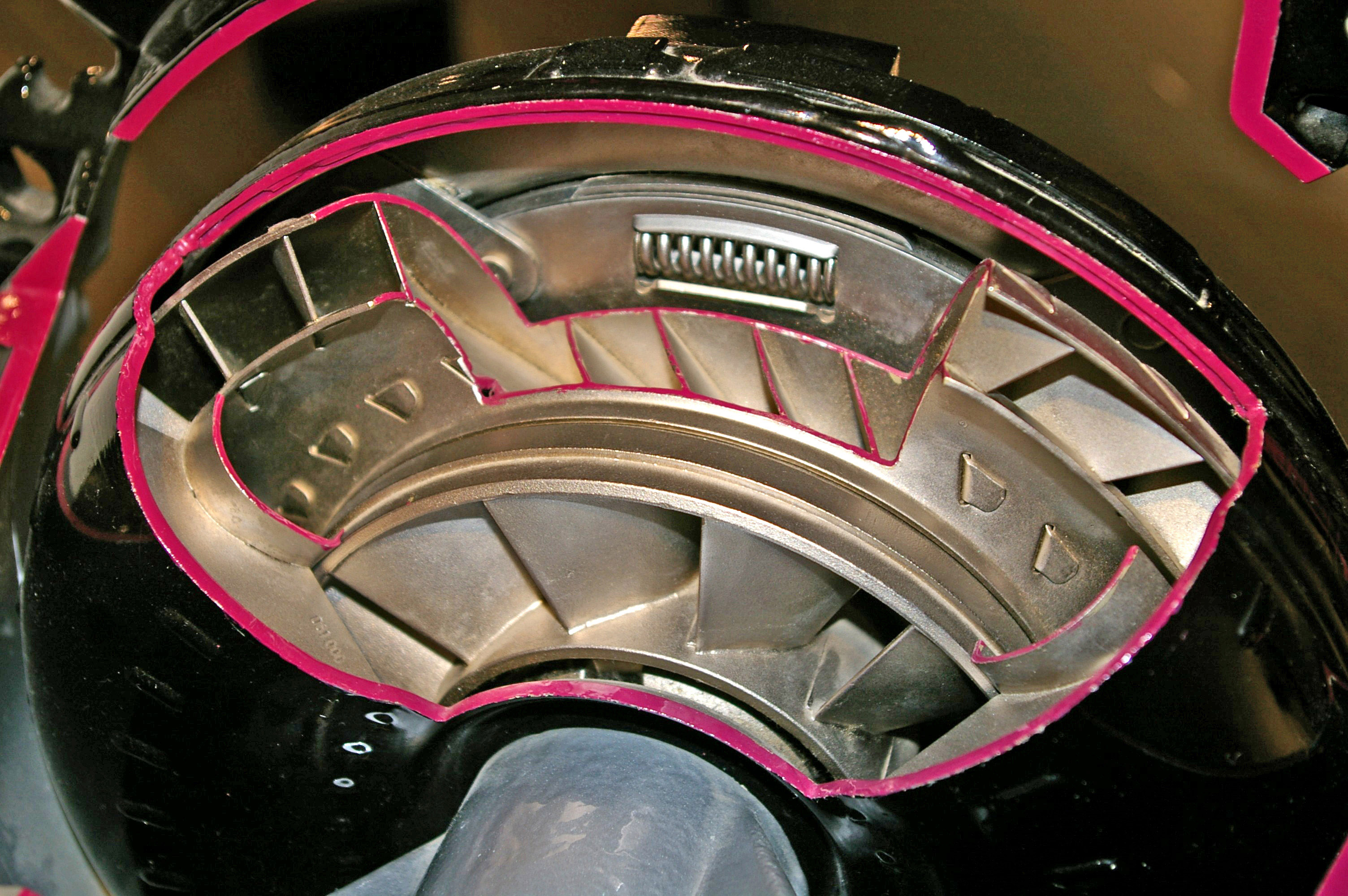
Torque converter – cutaway view

To provide coupling and decoupling of the engine, a modern automatic transmission uses a torque converter instead of the friction clutch used in a manual transmission.

=== History ===
==== 1904–1939: Predecessors to the hydraulic automatic ====
The 1904 Sturtevant "horseless carriage gearbox" is often considered to be the first automatic transmission for motor vehicles. At higher engine speeds, high gear was engaged. As the vehicle slowed down and engine speed decreased, the gearbox would shift back to low. However, the transmission was prone to sudden failure, due to the transmission being unable to withstand forces from the abrupt gear changes.

The adoption of planetary gearsets was a significant advance towards the modern automatic transmission. One of the first transmissions to use this design was the manual transmission fitted to the 1901–1904 Wilson-Pilcher automobile. This transmission was built in the United Kingdom and used two epicyclic gears to provide four gear ratios. A foot clutch was used for standing starts, gear selection was using a hand lever, helical gears were used (to reduce noise) and the gears used a constant-mesh design. A planetary gearset was also used in the 1908 Ford Model T, which was fitted with a two-speed manual transmission (without helical gears).

An early patent for the automatic transmission was granted to Canadian inventor Alfred Horner Munro of Regina in 1923. Being a steam engineer, Munro designed his device to use compressed air rather than hydraulic fluid, and so it lacked power and never found commercial application.

In 1923, a patent was approved in the United States describing the operation of a transmission where the manual shifting of gears and manual operation of a clutch was eliminated. This patent was submitted by Henry R. Hoffman from Chicago and was titled: Automatic Gear Shift and Speed Control. The patent described the workings of such a transmission as "...having a series of clutches disposed intermediate the engine shaft and the differential shaft and in which the clutches are arranged to selectively engage and drive the differential shaft dependent upon the speed at which the differential shaft rotates". However, it would be over a decade later until automatic transmissions were produced in significant quantities. In the meantime, several European and British manufacturers would use preselector gearboxes, a form of manual transmission which removed the reliance on the driver's skill to achieve smooth gear shifts.

The first automatic transmission using hydraulic fluid was developed in 1932 by two Brazilian engineers, José Braz Araripe and Fernando Lehly Lemos.

The evolution towards mass-produced automatic transmissions continued with the 1933–1935 REO Motor Car Company Self-Shifter semi-automatic transmission, which automatically shifted between two forward gears in the "Forward" mode (or between two shorter gear ratios in the "Emergency low" mode). Driver involvement was still required during normal driving, since standing starts required the driver to use the clutch pedal. This was followed in 1937 by the Oldsmobile Automatic Safety Transmission. Similar in operation to the REO Self-Shifter, the Automatic Safety Transmission shifted automatically between the two gear ratios available in the "Low" and "High" ranges and the clutch pedal was required for standing starts. It used a planetary gearset. The Chrysler Fluid Drive, introduced in 1939, was an optional addition to manual transmissions where a fluid coupling (similar to a torque-convertor, but without the torque multiplication) was added, to avoid the need to operate a manual clutch.

==== 1939–1964: Early hydraulic automatics ====
The General Motors Hydra-Matic became the first mass-produced automatic transmission following its introduction in 1939 (1940 model year). Available as an option in cars such as the Oldsmobile Series 60 and Cadillac Sixty Special, the Hydra-Matic combined a fluid coupling with three hydraulically controlled planetary gearsets to produce four forward speeds plus reverse. The transmission was sensitive to engine throttle position and road speed, producing fully automatic up- and down-shifting that varied according to operating conditions. Features of the Hydra-Matic included a wide spread of ratios (allowing both good acceleration in first gear and cruising at low engine speed in top gear) and the fluid coupling handling only a portion of the engine's torque in the top two gears (increasing fuel economy in those gears, similar to a lock-up torque converter). Use of the Hydra-Matic spread to other General Motors brands and then to other manufacturers starting 1948 including Hudson, Lincoln, Kaiser, Nash, Holden (Australia), as well as Rolls-Royce and Bentley licensing production in the UK and providing the transmission to Jensen Motors, Armstrong Siddeley and other UK manufacturers. During World War II, the Hydra-Matic was used in some military vehicles.

The first automatic transmission to use a torque converter (instead of a fluid coupling) was the Buick Dynaflow, which was introduced for the 1948 model year. In normal driving, the Dynaflow used only the top gear, relying on the torque multiplication of the torque convertor at lower speeds. The Dynaflow was followed by the Packard Ultramatic in mid-1949 and the Chevrolet Powerglide for the 1950 model year. Each of these transmissions had only two forward speeds, relying on the converter for additional torque multiplication. In the early 1950s, BorgWarner developed a series of three-speed torque converter automatics for car manufacturers such as American Motors, Ford and Studebaker. Chrysler was late in developing its own true automatic, introducing the two-speed torque converter PowerFlite in 1953, and the three-speed TorqueFlite in 1956. The latter was the first to utilize the Simpson compound planetary gearset.

In 1956, the General Motors Hydra-Matic (which still used a fluid coupling) was redesigned based around the use of two fluid couplings to provide smoother shifts. This transmission was called the Controlled Coupling Hydra-Matic, or "Jetaway" transmission. The original Hydra-Matic remained in production until the mid-1960s at GM, with the licensed Rolls-Royce Automatic transmission soldiering on until 1978 on the Rolls-Royce Phantom VI. In 1964, General Motors released a new transmission, the Turbo Hydramatic, a three-speed transmission which used a torque convertor. The Turbo Hydramatic was among the first to have the basic gear selections (park, reverse, neutral, drive, low) which became the standard gear selection used for several decades.

==== 1965–present: increased ratio count and electronics ====
By the late 1960s, most of the fluid-coupling two-speed and four-speed transmissions had disappeared in favor of three-speed units with torque converters. Also around this time, whale oil was removed from the automatic transmission fluid. During the 1980s, automatic transmissions with four gear ratios became increasingly common, and many were equipped with lock-up torque convertors in order to improve fuel economy.

Electronics began to be more commonly used to control the transmission, replacing mechanical control methods such as spring-loaded valves in the valve body. Most systems use solenoids which are controlled by either the engine control unit, or a separate transmission control unit. This allows for more precise control of shift points, shift quality, lower shift times and manual control.

The first five-speed automatic was the Jatco 5R01, introduced in 1989 by Nissan in the Cedric and Gloria, and was electronically controlled. The first six-speed automatic was the ZF 6HP26 transmission, which debuted in the 2002 BMW 7 Series (E65). The first seven-speed automatic was the Mercedes-Benz 7G-Tronic transmission, which debuted a year later. In 2007, the first eight-speed transmission to reach production was the Toyota AA80E transmission. The first nine-speed and ten-speed transmissions were the 2013 ZF 9HP transmission and 2017 Toyota Direct Shift-10A (used in the Lexus LC) respectively.

=== Gear selectors ===
The gear selector is the input by which the driver selects the operating mode of an automatic transmission. Traditionally the gear selector is located between the two front seats or on the steering column, however electronic rotary dials and push-buttons have also been occasionally used since the 1980s, as well as push buttons having been used in the 1950s and 1960s by Rambler (automobile), Edsel, and most famously, by Chrysler. A few automobiles employed a lever on the instrument panel, such as the 1955 Chrysler Corporation cars, and notably, the Corvair.

==== P–R–N–D–L positions ====
Most cars use a "P–R–N–D–L" (also simply called "PRNDL") layout for the gear selector, which consists of the following positions:

- Park (P): This position disengages the transmission from the engine (as with the neutral position), and a parking pawl mechanically locks the output shaft of the transmission. This prevents the driven wheels from rotating to prevent the vehicle from moving. The use of the hand brake (parking brake) is also recommended when parking on slopes, since this provides greater protection from the vehicle moving. The park position is omitted on buses/coaches/tractors, which must instead be placed in neutral with the air-operated parking brakes set. Some early passenger car automatics, such as the pre-1960 Chrysler cars and the Corvair Powerglide, did not have the park feature at all. These cars were started in neutral and required the driver to apply a parking brake when parked. The original Hydra-Matic from GM instead engaged a parking pawl when placed in reverse with the engine off, thus dispensing with a park position until the adoption of the Controlled Coupling Hydra-Matic in 1956.
  The park position usually includes a lockout function (such as a button on the side of the gear selector or requiring that the brake pedal be pressed) which prevents the transmission from being accidentally shifted from park into other gear selector positions. Many cars also prevent the engine from being started when the selector is in any position other than park or neutral (often in combination with requiring the brake pedal to be pressed).
- Reverse (R): This position engages reverse gear, so that the vehicle drives in a backwards direction. It also operates the reversing lights and on some vehicles can activate other functions including parking sensors, backup cameras and reversing beepers (to warn pedestrians).
  Some modern transmissions have a mechanism that will prevent shifting into the reverse position when the vehicle is moving forward, often using a switch on the brake pedal or electronic transmission controls that monitor the vehicle speed.
- Neutral (N): This position disengages the transmission from the engine, allowing the vehicle to move regardless of the engine's speed. Prolonged movement of the vehicle in neutral with the engine off at significant speeds ("coasting") can damage some automatic transmissions, since the lubrication pump is often powered by the input side of the transmission and is therefore not running when the transmission is in neutral. The vehicle may be started in neutral as well as park.
- Drive (D): This position is the normal mode for driving forwards. It allows the transmission to engage the full range of available forward gear ratios.
- Low (L): This position provides for engine braking on steep hills. It also provides for a lower gear ratio for starting out when heavily loaded.

Some automatic transmissions, especially by General Motors from 1940 to 1964, used a layout with reverse as the bottom position (e.g. N–D–L–R or P–N–D–L–R).

==== Other positions and modes ====
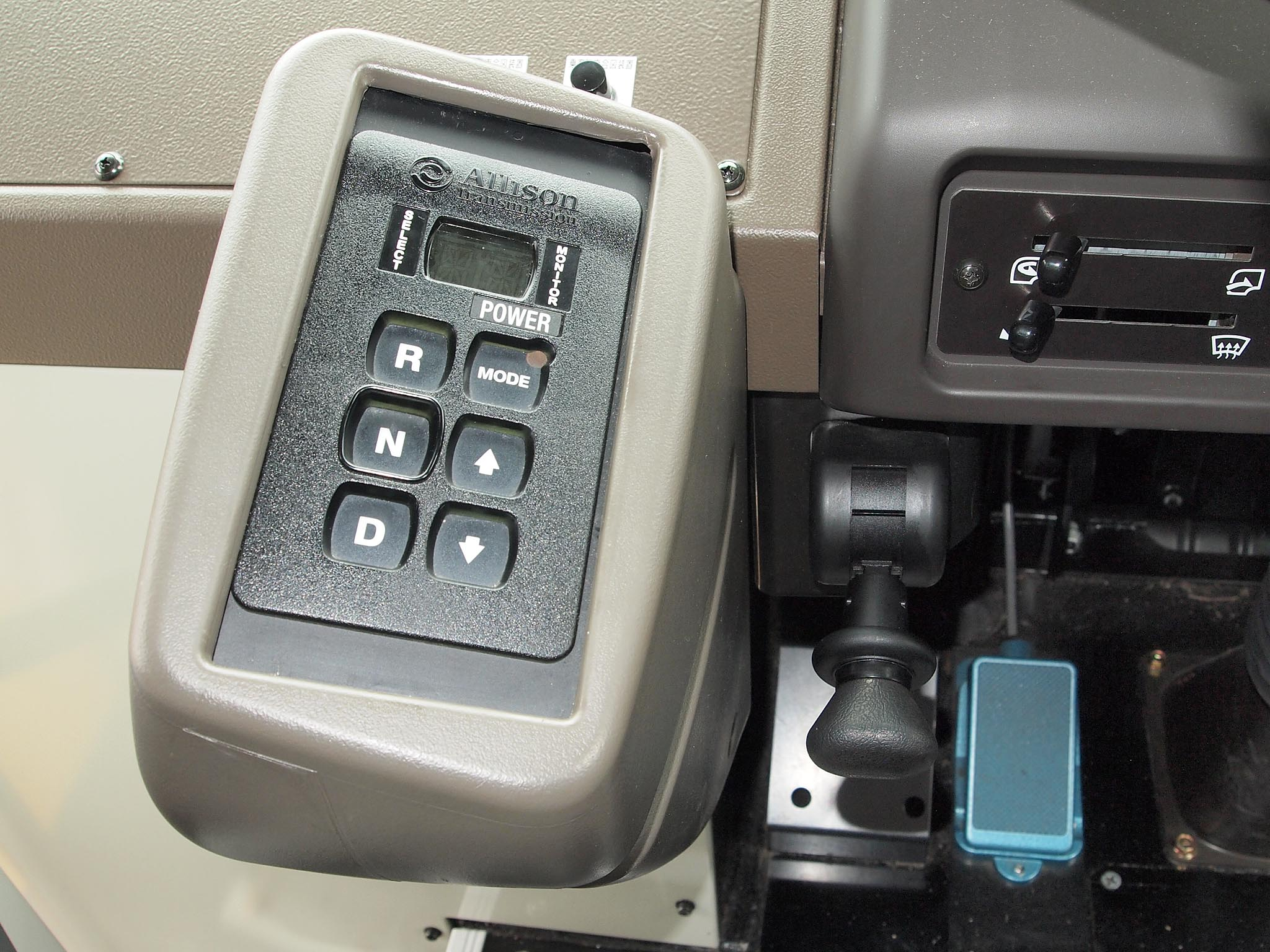
Push-button gear selector in a 2010–2014 Mitsubishi Fuso Aero Star bus

Many transmissions also include positions to restrict the gear selection to the lower gears and engages the engine brake. These positions are often labelled "L" (low gear), "S" (second gear) or the number of the highest gear used in that position (eg 3, 2 or 1). If these positions are engaged at a time when it would result in excessive engine speed, many modern transmissions disregard the selector position and remain in the higher gear.

In descending order of the highest gear available:

- 3: Restricts the transmission to the lowest three gear ratios. In a 4-speed automatic transmission, this is often used to prevent the car shifting into the overdrive ratio. In some cars, the position labelled "D" performs this function, while another position labelled "OD" or a boxed "[D]" allows all gears to be used.
- 2 (also labelled "S"): Restricts the transmission to the lowest two gear ratios. In some cars, it is also used to accelerate from standstill in second gear instead of first, for situations of reduced traction (such as snow or gravel). This function is sometimes called "winter mode", labelled "W".
- 1 (also labelled "L"): Restricts the transmission to first gear only, also known as a "low gear". This is useful when a large torque is required at the wheels (for example, when accelerating up a steep incline); however use at higher speeds can run the engine at an excessive speed, risking overheating or damage.

Many modern transmissions include modes to adjust the shift logic to prefer either power or fuel economy. "Sport" (also called "Power" or "Performance") modes cause gear shifts to occur at higher engine speeds, allowing higher acceleration. "Economy" (also called "Eco" or "Comfort") modes cause gear shifts to occur at lower engine speeds to reduce fuel consumption.

==== Manual controls ====
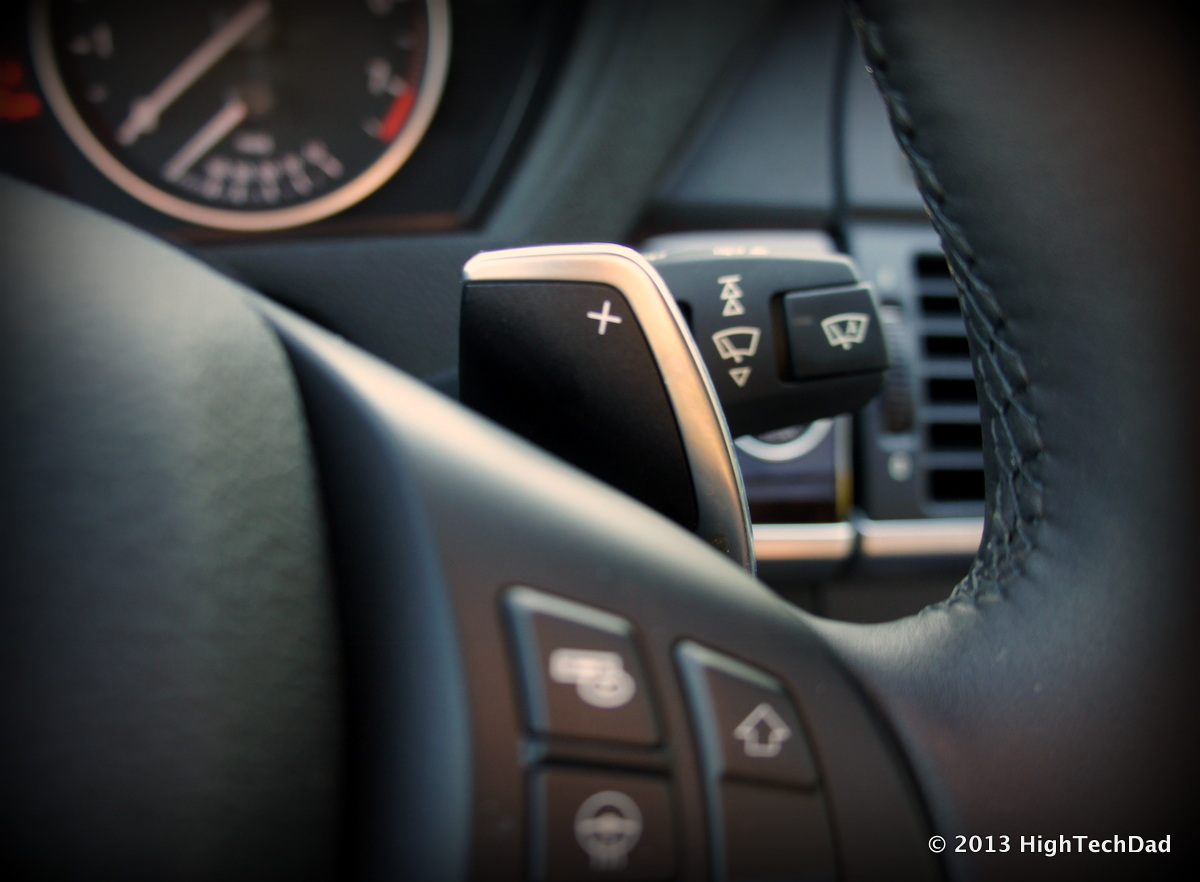
Paddle shifter (labelled "+") in a 2013 BMW X5

Since the 1990s, systems to manually request a specific gear or an upshift/downshift have become more common. These manumatic transmissions offer the driver greater control over the gear selection that the traditional modes to restrict the transmission to the lower gears.

Use of the manumatic functions are typically achieved either via paddles located beside the steering column, or "+" and "-" controls on the gear selector. Some cars offer drivers both methods to request a manual gear selection.

== Continuously variable transmission (CVT) ==
Operating principle for a pulley-based CVT

A continuously variable transmission (CVT) can change seamlessly through a continuous (infinite) range of gear ratios, compared with other automatic transmissions that provide a limited number of gear ratios in fixed steps. The flexibility of a CVT with suitable control may allow the engine to operate at a constant angular velocity while the vehicle moves at varying speeds.

CVTs are used in cars, tractors, UTVs, motor scooters, snowmobiles, and earthmoving equipment.

The most common type of CVT uses two pulleys connected by a belt or chain. However, several other designs have also been used.

== Dual-clutch transmission (DCT) ==
Schematic of a DCT

A dual-clutch transmission (DCT, sometimes referred to as a twin-clutch transmission, or double-clutch transmission) uses two separate clutches for odd and even gear sets. The design is often similar to two separate manual transmissions with their respective clutches contained within one housing, and working as one unit. In most car and truck applications, the DCT functions as an automatic transmission, requiring no driver input to change gears.

The first DCT to reach production was the Easidrive automatic transmission introduced on the 1961 Hillman Minx mid-size car. This was followed by various eastern European tractors through the 1970s (using manual operation via a single clutch pedal), then the Porsche 962 C racing car in 1985. The first DCT of the modern era was used in the 2003 Volkswagen Golf R32. Since the late 2000s, DCTs have become increasingly widespread, and have supplanted hydraulic automatic transmissions in various models of cars.

== Automated manual transmission (AMT) ==
Automated manual transmission (AMT), sometimes referred to as a clutchless manual, is a type of multi-speed automobile transmission system that is closely based on the mechanical design of a conventional manual transmission, and automates either the clutch system, the gear shifting, or both simultaneously, requiring partial, or no driver input or involvement.

Earlier versions of these transmissions that are semi-automatic in operation, such as Autostick, control only the clutch system automatically — and use different forms of actuation (usually via an actuator or servo) to automate the clutch, but still require the driver's input and full control to manually actuate gear changes by hand. Modern versions of these systems that are fully automatic in operation, such as Selespeed and Easytronic, require no driver input over gear changes or clutch operation. Semi-automatic versions require only partial driver input (i.e., the driver must change gears manually), while fully automatic versions require no manual driver input, whatsoever (TCU or ECU operates both the clutch system and gear shifts automatically).

Modern automated manual transmissions (AMT) have their roots and origins in older clutchless manual transmissions that began to appear on mass-production automobiles in the early 1930s and 1940s, prior to the introduction of hydraulic automatic transmissions. These systems were designed to reduce the amount of clutch or gear shifter usage required by the driver. These devices were intended to reduce the difficulty of operating conventional unsynchronised manual transmissions ("crash gearboxes") that were commonly used at the time, especially in stop-start driving. An early example of this transmission was introduced with the Hudson Commodore in 1942, called Drive-Master. This unit was an early semi-automatic transmission, based on the design of a conventional manual transmission, which used a servo-controlled vacuum-operated clutch system, with three different gear shifting modes, at the touch of a button; manual shifting and manual clutch operation (fully manual), manual shifting with automated clutch operation (semi-automatic), and automatic shifting with automatic clutch operation (fully automatic). Another early example of this transmission system was introduced in the 1955 Citroën DS, which used a 4-speed BVH transmission. This semi-automatic transmission used an automated clutch, which was actuated using hydraulics. Gear selection also used hydraulics, however, the gear ratio needs to be manually selected by the driver. This system was nicknamed Citro-Matic in the U.S.

The first modern AMTs were introduced by BMW and Ferrari in 1997, with their SMG and F1 transmissions, respectively. Both systems used hydraulic actuators and electrical solenoids, and a designated transmission control unit (TCU) for the clutch and shifting, plus steering wheel-mounted paddle shifters, if the driver wanted to change gear manually.

Modern fully automatic AMTs, such as Selespeed and Easytronic, have now been largely superseded and replaced by the increasingly widespread dual-clutch transmission design.

== See also ==
- Category:Automobile transmissions
- Category:Automatic transmission tradenames
- Motor vehicle
- Park by wire
- Shift by wire
- Torque converter
