= Wilson-Pilcher =

English car company

- Company type: Private
- Founded: 1901
- Defunct: 1904
- Fate: Liquidation
- Successor: Armstrong Whitworth
- Headquarters: Newcastle upon Tyne, England
- Key people: Walter Gordon Wilson and co-designer Percy Pilcher

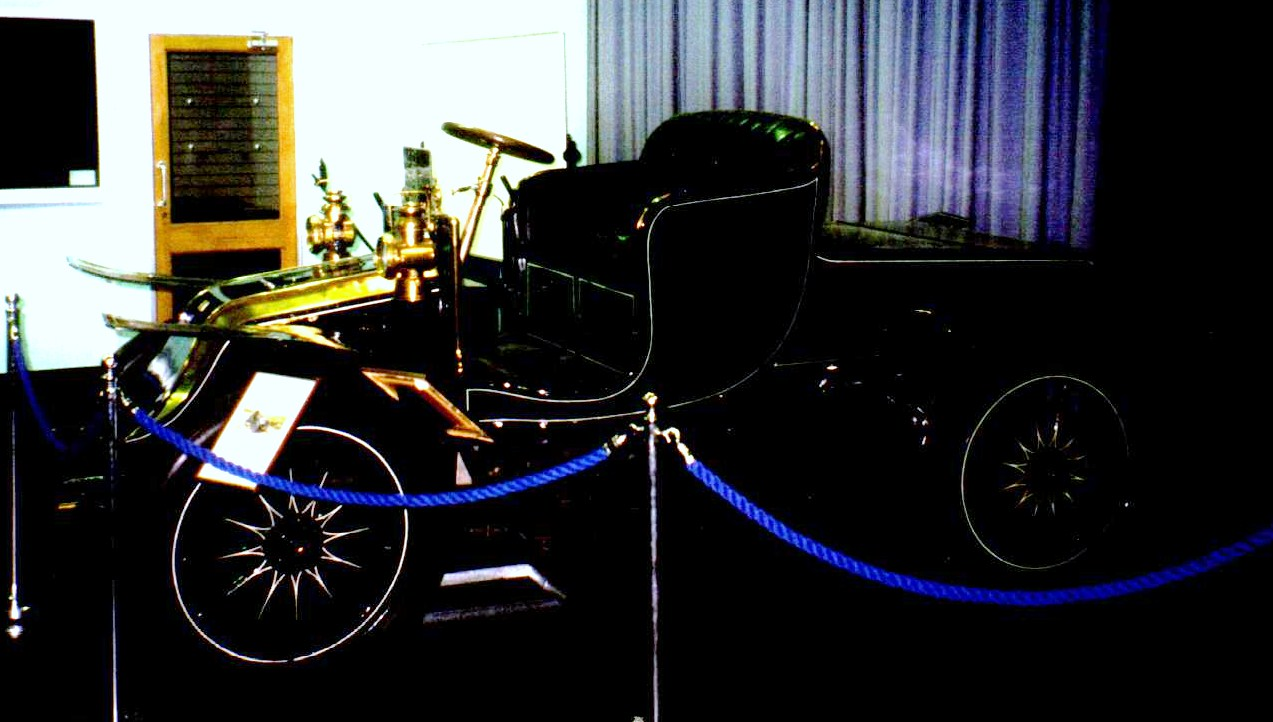
Wilson-Pilcher 1904

Wilson-Pilcher was an English car company founded in 1901 and acquired by Sir WG Taken Armstrong Whitworth & Co., Limited in 1904.

== History ==
The company Wilson-Pilcher was founded in 1901 by Walter Gordon Wilson in London to produce automobiles. In 1904 it was acquired by Sir WG Taken Armstrong Whitworth & Co., Limited and production moved to Newcastle upon Tyne. Percy Pilcher had died in a gliding accident in 1899, and Wilson had been working with him on the engine for an attempt at powered flight. According to Bonhams there is photographic evidence of a wooden mock-up of the car in 1899, and a photo of a working car taken at Stanhope Hall in 1900.

Production stopped in 1907.

== Vehicles ==
The first model had a 9 hp four cylinder flat engine of 2400 cc displacement. In 1903 this was replaced by the 12/16 hp engine of 2694 cc capacity. In 1904 a six-cylinder 18/24 HP engine of 4041 cc capacity was added to the range. In April 1904 The Automotor Journal gave a detailed report on the Wilson-Pilcher car, which was by then being built by Armstrong Whitworth in Newcastle. This report states that the cylinders of both models were of 3.75inch bore and stroke. This gives capacities of 2715cc for the four-cylinder engine and 4072cc for the six-cylinder engine.

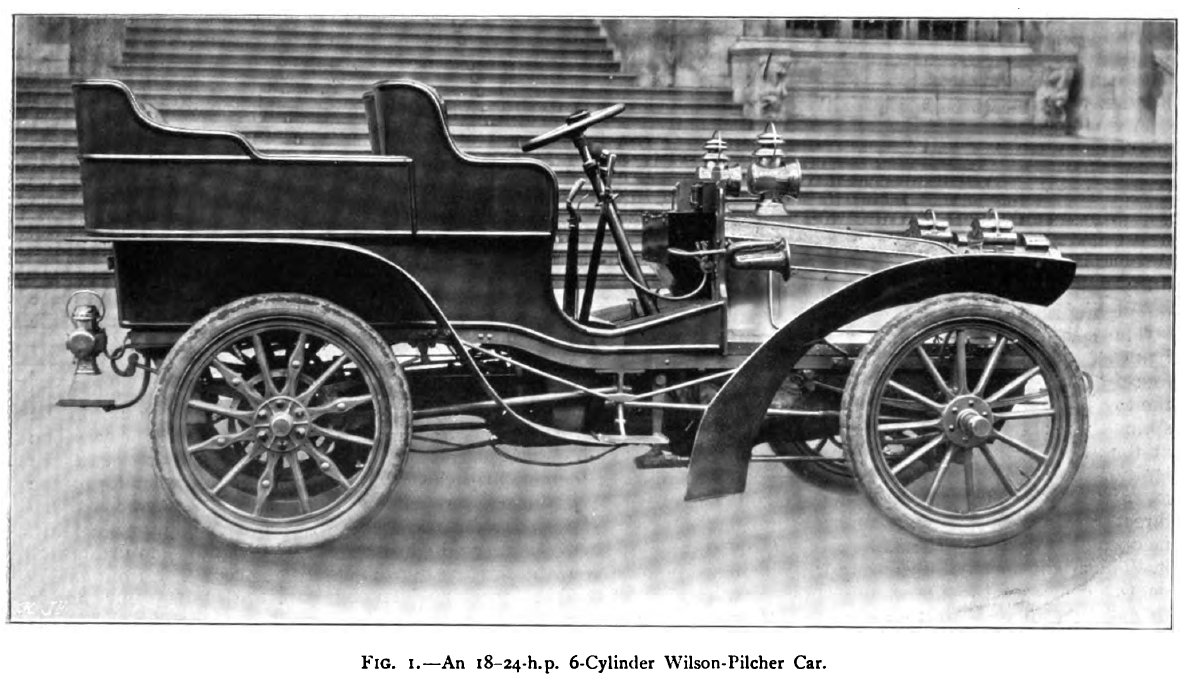
A 1904 Wilson-Pilcher Car

A 4-cylinder example of this car survives, registration number "BB96", and has been displayed in various museums, and was sold at auction in 2012 for £203,100, having previously been on display in the Coventry Transport Museum. The auctioneer's description of the car states that photographs exist showing a wooden mock-up in 1899, and a complete car at Stanhope Hall in 1900.

== Details of chassis, engine, and transmission ==
The details of the Wilson-Pilcher car were considered sufficiently advanced and novel that the make was the subject of a detailed article spanning three editions of the Automotor Journal of 1904, from which the information and images below are extracted.

=== Chassis ===
The engine was suspended in the conventional location at the front of the car at a slight angle to allow straight drive to the rear axle, and with the cylinders lying between the frames of the chassis. The mountings above the engine allowed it to rock sideways to some extent, this being limited by a pair of helical springs at the front and by diagonal radius rods connecting the rear of the gearbox to the ends of the rear axle. In this way the mechanical vibration of the engine and transmission was largely isolated from the chassis and occupants. Images below are for the 1904 six-cylinder version of the car.

Wilson-Pilcher Layout with Bodywork Removed

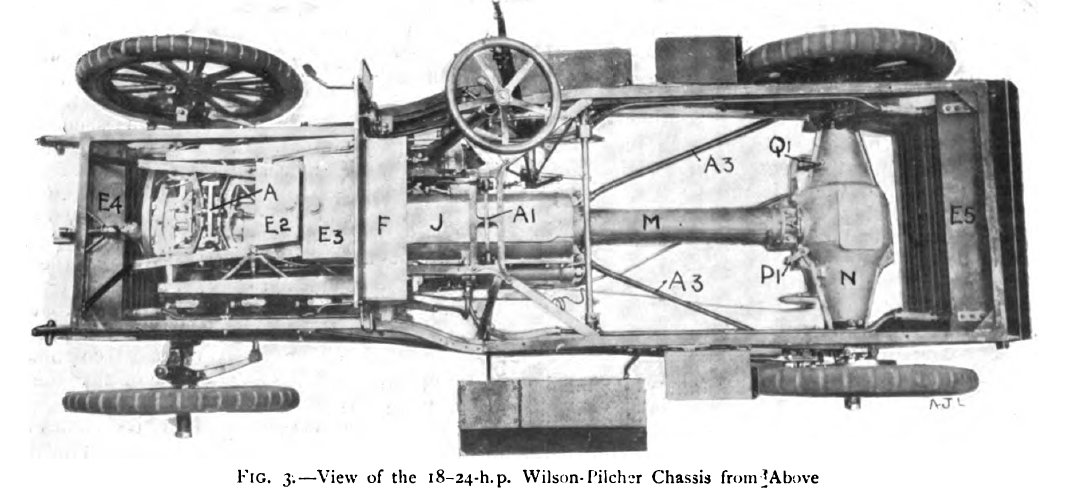
Chassis Layout viewed from above

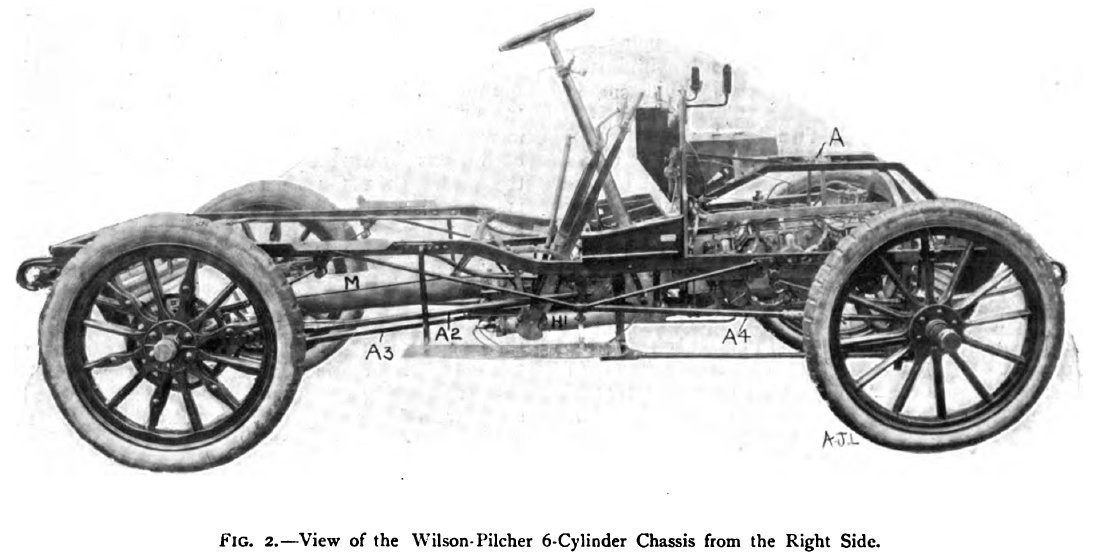
Chassis Layout viewed from side

=== Engine ===
Both the four cylinder and six cylinder engines had identical cylinders of 3.75 inches bore and stroke. Each cylinder was bolted onto the aluminium crankcase, with the cylinders offset to allow each to have its own crank pin. Intermediate crankshaft bearings were provided between each pair of cylinders. The inlet valves were automatic on the top of the cylinders, and the exhaust valves were beneath the cylinders, operated by a camshaft beneath the crankshaft. The engine ratings of 12-16 hp for the four cylinder, and 18-24 for the six cylinder are described as "the lower powers mentioned in both cases are those which can be obtained on the road-wheels under average running conditions - hill-climbing - whilst the higher powers mentioned are those developed by the respective engines on the brake, when running at a speed of 1,000 revs. per min."

The single gear-driven camshaft is arranged so that each lobe operates the exhaust valves on a pair of cylinders. Roller cam followers are used. In the middle of the camshaft is a speed governor. The governor causes lengthwise movement of the camshaft, and the cam-lobes are slightly widened to allow for this. The speed-regulation caused by the governor is set by a lever on the steering column and the same mechanism advances the spark with increased engine speed. The operation of the governor is overridden by the foot throttle (either slower or faster - the pedal is of a type allowing it to be raised or depressed), but for normal running the governor offers an early form of cruise control.

Wilson-Pilcher Engines

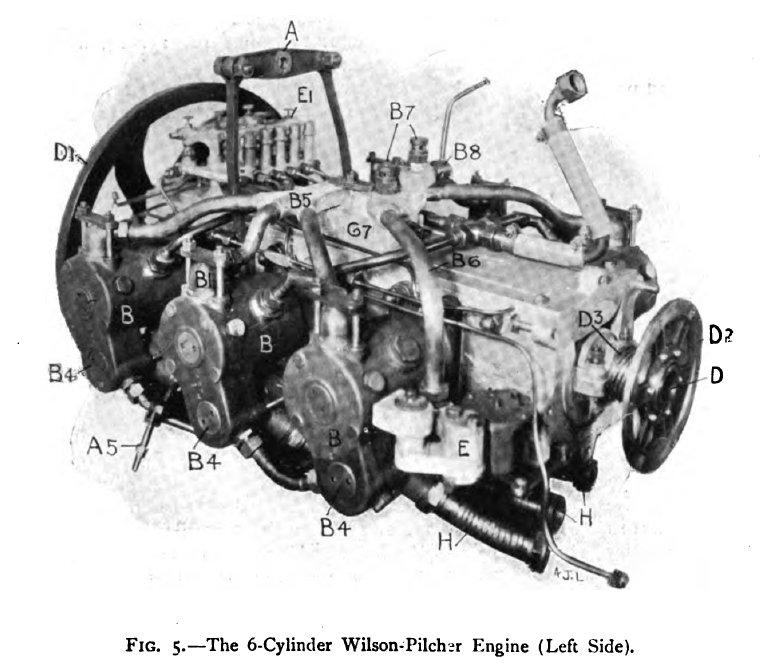
1904 Wilson-Pilcher Flat-6

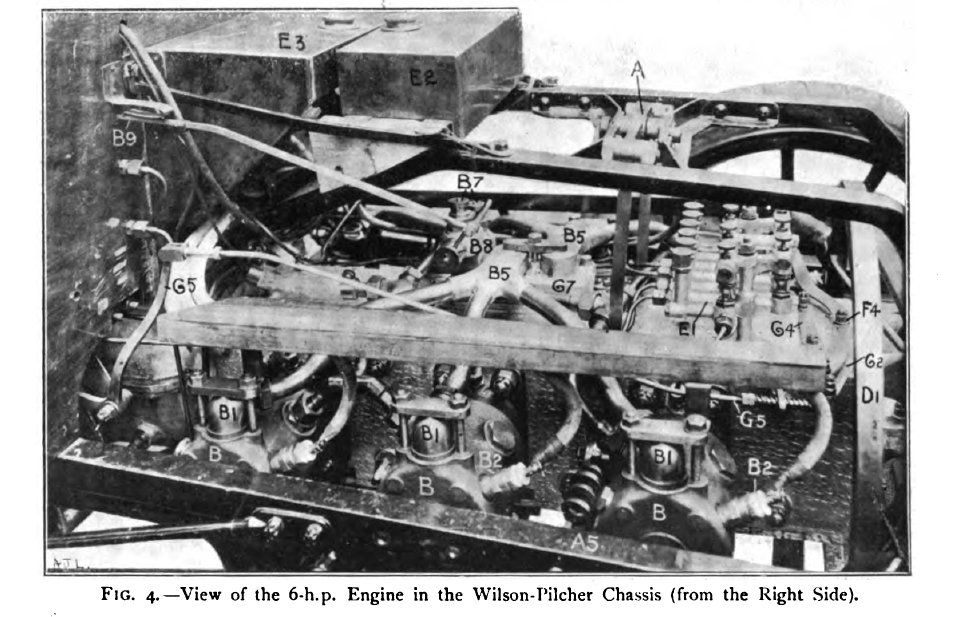
1904 Flat-6 in situ

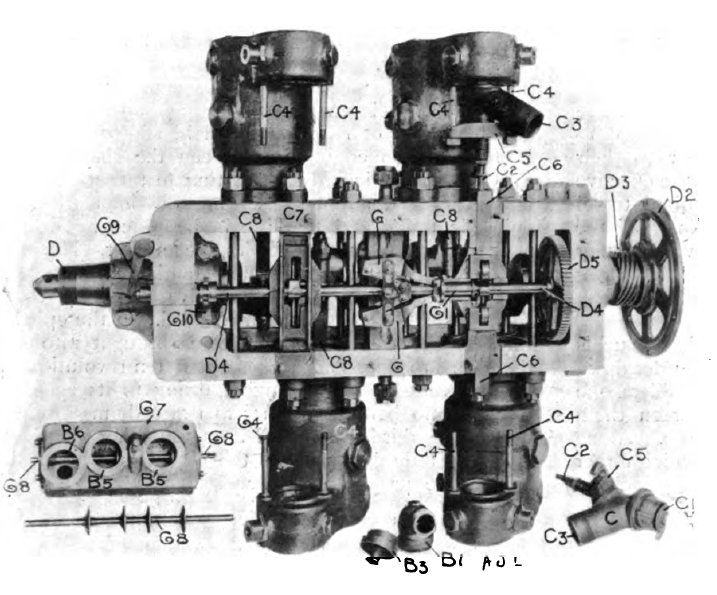
1904 Flat-4 engine with lower crankcase cover removed

=== Gearbox ===
The gearbox was housed in an aluminium casing and bolted directly onto the engine. It contained a main cone clutch and two epicyclic gears, allowing four forward speeds. All gears are helical which substantially reduces gear noise, and the drive is direct through in top gear. The main foot-operated clutch could be latched in the disengaged position by depressing and moving the foot pedal to one side, allowing the engine to be started and idled without driving the wheels. Once the clutch pedal was released gear changes were made using a hand lever without the need to use the main clutch. This image also shows the gearbox attached to the four-cylinder engine and clearly shows the offset between the cylinders, and the flywheel at the front of the engine which doubled as a fan. The epicyclic gear next to the clutch has a reduction ratio of 2.7:1, the other has a reduction ratio of 1.7:1. The latter is used to give 3rd gear, the former to give 2nd gear, and both together give 1st gear, all operated by a single hand lever. The fact that reverse is not provided by the gearbox, but instead by the rear axle (see below), and operated by a reversing lever separate from the gearchange lever, means the cars had as many reverse gears as they did forward gears. The use of helical planetary gears later became the main gear mechanism for automatic transmissions, the key difference from the Wilson-Pilcher design being that gear changes were made automatically and not by moving a gear change lever.

Wilson-Pilcher Gearbox

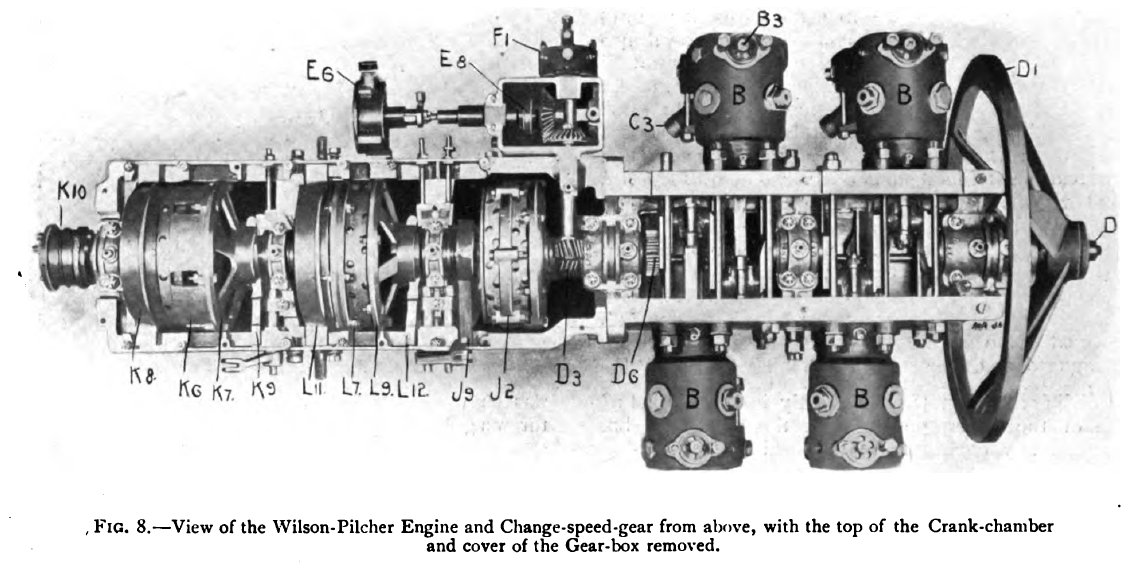
Four cylinder engine and gearbox with top covers removed

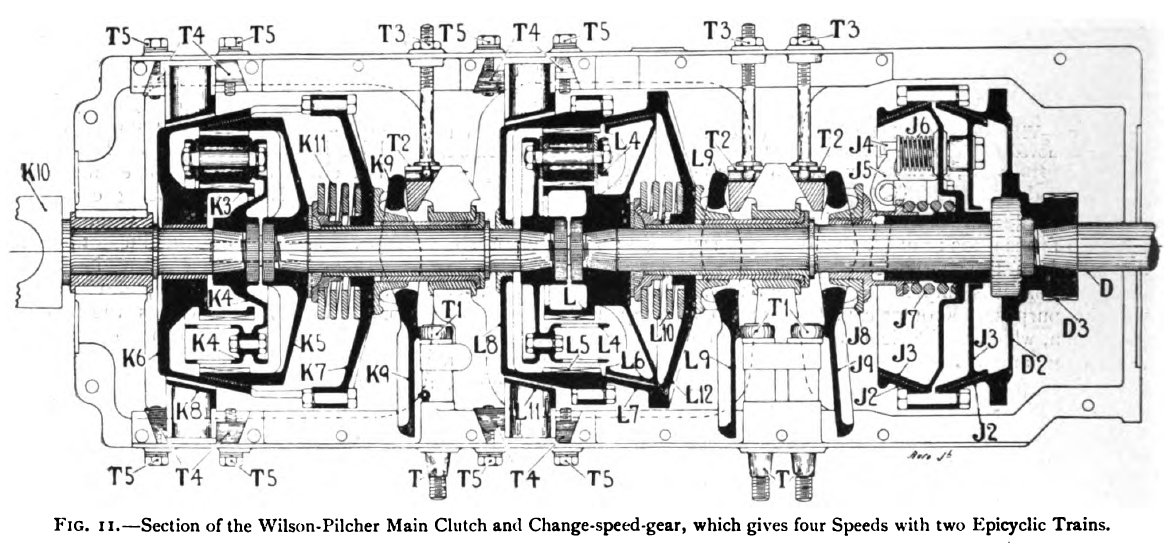
Sectional view of the clutch and epicyclic gearbox

=== Rear Axle ===
The rear axle, like the gearbox and engine, was housed in an aluminium case. In addition to the normal function of providing a differential, it also provided the reverse gear, and contained the rear brake (foot operated). Reversing is achieved by changing which of the large bevel gears (these days known as crown wheels) engages with the drive on the end of the propshaft. Like the gearbox, all gears within the axle are helical cut.

Wilson-Pilcher Rear Axle

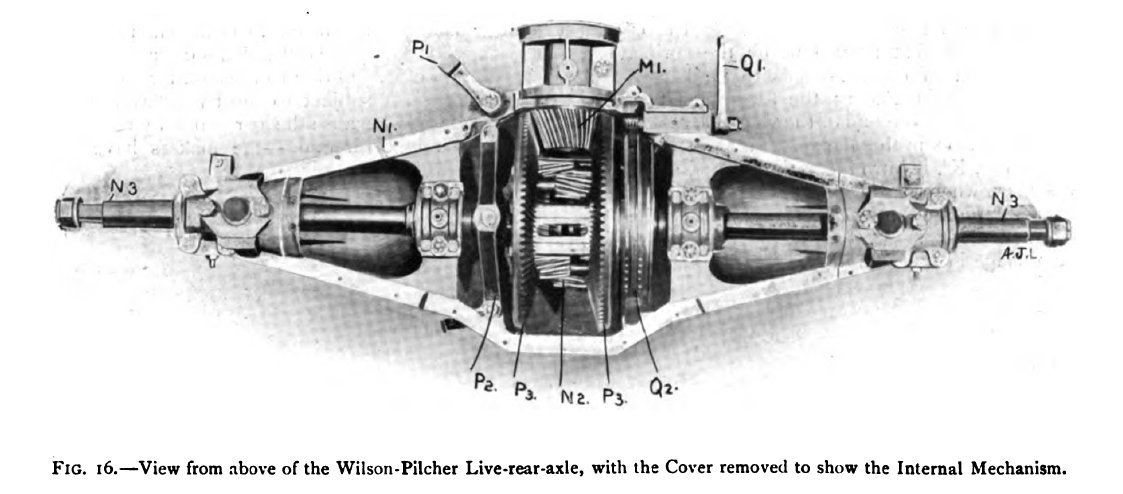
Rear axle with top cover removed

== See also ==
- List of car manufacturers of the United Kingdom

== Bibliography ==
- G. N. Georgano: Autos. Encyclopédie complète. 1885 à nos jours. Courtille, 1975 (French)
- David Culshaw, Peter Horrobin: The Complete Catalogue of British Cars 1895–1975, Veloce Publishing PLC, Dorchester (1997), ISBN 1-874105-93-6 (English)
