= Parking pawl =

Transmission-fitted device used to secure a parked vehicle

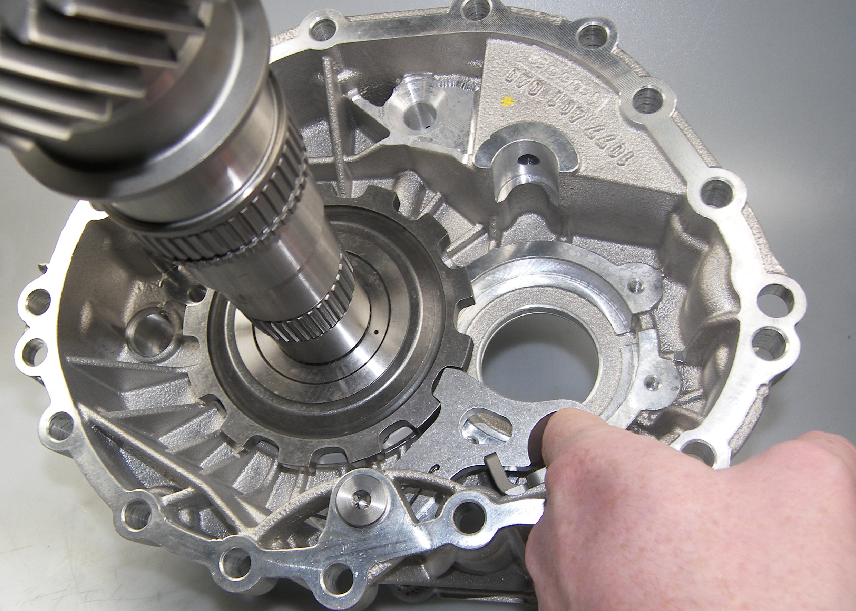
Interior of an automatic transmission, showing the toothed locking wheel and the pawl below it; a finger is touching the pawl

A parking pawl is a device fitted to a motor vehicle's automatic transmission that locks up the transmission when the transmission shift lever selector is placed in the Park position. "Park" is the first position of the lever (topmost on a column shift, frontmost on a floor shift) in all cars sold in the United States since 1965 (when the order was standardised by the Society of Automotive Engineers (SAE)) through SAE J915, and in most other vehicles worldwide.

== Mechanism ==
The parking pawl locks the transmission's output shaft to the transmission casing by engaging a pawl (a pin) that engages in a notched wheel on the shaft, stopping it (and thus the driven wheels) from rotating. The main components of a parking pawl mechanism are the parking gear, parking pawl, actuator rod, cam collar, cam plate, pivot pin, and parking pawl return spring. The mechanism assembly is designed so that the parking pawl tooth collides and overrides the parking gear teeth (ratchets) until a safe engagement speed for the vehicle is reached. Software controls are put in place to avoid this condition and engage the pawl only when the vehicle has come to a standstill.

== Standards ==
- FMVSS 114 – Theft Protection and Rollaway Prevention, Keyless Ignition Systems
- SAE J2208 – Park Standard for Automatic Transmissions.

== See also ==
- Park by wire
- Transmission brake
- Electronic parking brake
